= A726 road =

Road in Scotland

Coordinates: 55.7524°N 4.2787°W

A726

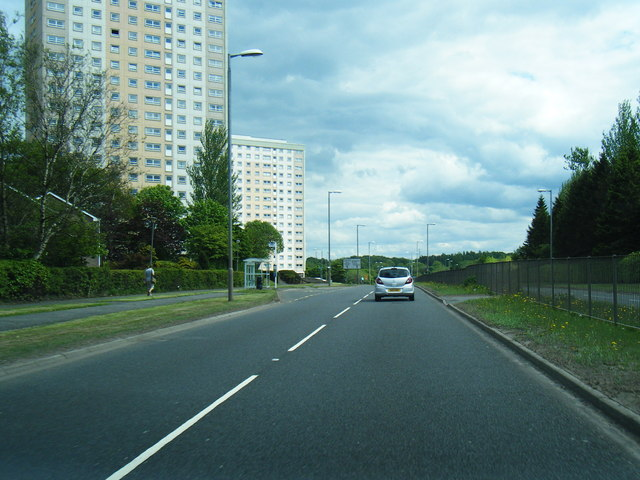
- A726 Strathaven Road, in East Kilbride

Route information
- Length: 27.3 mi (43.9 km)

Major junctions
- Southeast end: Strathaven / Darnley
- Northwest end: Newton Mearns / Erskine

Location
- Country: United Kingdom
- Constituent country: Scotland

Road network
- Roads in the United Kingdom; Motorways; A and B road zones
← A725	→ A727

The A726 road in Scotland is a major route with several distinct sections with different characteristics and names; owing to its stages of construction, since 2005 it has two separate parts, the first running between Strathaven in South Lanarkshire and Junction 5 of the M77 motorway south of Newton Mearns in East Renfrewshire via East Kilbride, and the other running between Junction 3 of the M77 and the M898 motorway near the Erskine Bridge, via Paisley and Junction 29 of the M8 motorway near Glasgow International Airport.

== Route ==
=== Strathaven and East Kilbride ===
The A726's first section begins in the small market town of Strathaven in South Lanarkshire as Glasgow Road, taking over from the A723, a short section of which connects to the primary route into the town, the A71, itself about 5 1/2 miles (9 kilometres) west of Junction 8 of the M74 motorway via Stonehouse. While the A723 heads north-east towards Hamilton, the A726 goes north-west through open farmland, passing the small village of Chapelton towards the large town of East Kilbride – in 2014 the entire road was quoted as being one of the most dangerous in the world owing to the number of accidents on it, and many of these incidents would originate from this single carriageway section which has a wide variety of traffic types, several tight bends and an open, elevated setting which is liable to be affected by poor weather conditions.

On entering East Kilbride, the road becomes Strathaven Road, and remains single-carriageway up to the Torrance Roundabout at Crutherland near Calderglen Country Park. It stayed as such for a further one mile (1.5 kilometres) north until a £23 million project was undertaken in 2019 to convert this to dual carriageway, along with the unclassified Greenhills Road leading from the Torrance Roundabout's other exit, which had become increasingly busy and important as a route for residents living in the south of the town with the expansion of Lindsayfield in addition to the older Whitehills and Greenhills neighbourhoods. The project had fallen behind schedule by late 2021 and this section of the road was closed for an intended two-week period to expedite matters, but then re-opened early amid complaints from residents living on local rural roads that had seen a huge increase in traffic as a result of the closure.

The direction then becomes north-westerly, with a graded exit for the Kelvin Industrial Estate, the St Leonards neighbourhood and South Lanarkshire College, followed by a roundabout at Birniehill, meeting the southern end of the A725 which runs through the north of the town, to Junction 5 of the M74 via Blantyre, South Lanarkshire and eventually to Junction 7A of the M8 motorway via Bellshill.

The A726 at this point becomes the 'Queensway', the main east–west road through the planned town of the 1950s. It continues westwards, soon meeting a roundabout identical to the last in design (featuring underpasses for pedestrians and cyclists at each corner and a sunken landscaped area at its centre), with exits for the eastern ends of East Kilbride's town centre (mainly consisting of a series of connected indoor shopping precincts) and Murray residential neighbourhood, then a third roundabout for the western ends of these districts, plus eastern parts of Westwood, West Mains. A straight and interrupted stretch of nearly one mile (1.5 kilometres) follows, before a pair of roundabouts offer exits for Hairmyres Hospital and western parts of Westwood (B764), and for College Milton Industrial Estate and western parts of West Mains (B761). This leads on to another one-mile (1.5-kilometre) stretch featuring only one minor junction in either direction which do not allow cross-carriageway movement, until reaching the Philipshill Roundabout at Peel Park. Here the A726 designation switches to the southbound exit of the roundabout, named as Redwood Road and the start of the Glasgow Southern Orbital Route, completed in 2005. The road from East Kilbride continues westwards towards Busby via an overpass, but was renamed as the A727 from the time of the Southern Orbital being completed.

=== Glasgow Southern Orbital ===
The Southern Orbital, is a high-specification dual carriageway across open countryside for its entire length, but unlike the Queensway is not listed officially as a trunk road, instead being maintained under a Design, Build, Finance and Operate (DBFO) contract as part of an improvement programme for the M77 motorway. Its first grade-separated exit, for the B764 (Hairmyres), is sited within a few hundred yards of its start at Philipshill. The direction gradually changes from southbound to westbound by the time of reaching the Belle Craig Roundabout, meeting the B767 and serving the villages of Waterfoot to the north and Eaglesham to the south. The other road into Eaglesham, the B764 from Jackton, runs directly through the historic centre of the village and was previously the main route between this part of western Lanarkshire and Ayrshire, continuing over 'Eaglesham Moor' – Ballageich Hill and the periphery of the Whitelee Wind Farm – to join the A77 on a junction where several accidents occurred, and was generally unsuitable for the volume and types of traffic using it. This was one of the main reasons for the Southern Orbital's construction, the other being to provide direct access between East Kilbride and the M77 without having traffic on local roads within Newton Mearns or the existing suburban route via Clarkston and Giffnock (i.e. the road renamed to A727).

Two miles (three kilometres) further on from the Eaglesham roundabout, the Southern Orbital has an exit at Mearns Road for Newton Mearns itself, then an eastbound only entry/exit for the Maidenhill neighbourhood (added in 2022) before the road meets the M77 at Junction 5 which was rebuilt for completion of the Southern Orbital, offering access into Newton Mearns via the A77 which crosses over the motorway at the previous location of Junction 5 at Maidenhill / Malletsheugh. Together with the A725, this part of the A726 forms an important bypass for the Greater Glasgow region, connecting the three major motorways and several of the larger towns to the south-east of the city without having to travel through the city centre network.

=== Nitshill, Paisley and Renfrewshire ===
The second section of the A726 begins 3 1/2 miles (5.5 kilometres) further north from where the first ends, as a continuation of the A727 at Junction 3 of the M77 (completed along with this section of the motorway in 1996). It runs westwards as Nitshill Road – the only part of the entire route within the Glasgow city boundaries – passing the Jenny Lind, Deaconsbank, Arden, Darnley, Southpark Village, Parkhouse, South Nitshill, Nitshill, and Craigbank neighbourhoods, an entrance to the Dams to Darnley Country Park and Nitshill railway station, passing under the Glasgow South Western Line tracks via an arched bridge just before the station. It leaves the suburban environment after the staggered junction with the A736 at the Hurlet straddling the Glasgow-East Renfrewshire-Renfrewshire border, before continuing onto the south-eastern edge of Paisley at a roundabout with the B771 at Dykebar.

Running north-west as Barrhead Road, it has stretches of single and dual carriageway as it passes Hunterhill and Blackhall, meeting the split dual carriageway A761 (Gordon Street). This road continues eastwards as the A726 onto Mill Street to skirt around the centre of the town, crossing over the White Cart Water on the Hammills Bridge (the northbound road also continues as the unclassified Bridge Street and crosses the river via Abbey Bridge). It too turns north at Paisley Police Office / Lagoon Leisure Centre, meeting Gauze Street from the west which continues on to become Glasgow Road, restarting the A761 (this continues into central Glasgow as Paisley Road West). At St Mirin's Cathedral, the A726 turns west as Incle Street, then splits before passing under the Ayrshire Coast Line / Inverclyde Line railway tracks near Paisley Gilmour Street railway station, merging again at St James Street beside Paisley Sheriff Court. The intervening westbound lanes directly pass the station as Weir Street and Old Sneddon Street, while the eastbound lanes (as described in that direction of travel from the court) are initially unnamed before crossing the White Cart again, then become Niddry Street where they meet the start of the A741 which heads north to Renfrew – left lanes become its northbound carriageway, while right lanes feed the southbound Renfrew Road, designated as the A726 for a short distance until passing under the railway.

While St James Street continues west as the B775 (Underwood Road), the A726 turns sharply north as Caledonia Street then north-west as Greenock Road, becoming dual carriageway just prior to the St James Playing Fields, which it skirts around before passing under the elevated lanes of the start/end of the A737 (towards Linwood, Johnstone and North Ayrshire. It then reaches the St James Interchange, Junction 29 of the M8 motorway, also offering access to the A737 and to Glasgow International Airport. It continues on the north side of the interchange as Barnsford Road which runs around the western perimeter of the airport, then passes some fields and crosses the Black Cart Water and the isolated Inchinnan Business Park, meeting the A8 (Greenock Road) at Red Smiddy Roundabout.

The A8 heads west while the A726 continues north to Erskine, running as a 'spine road' through the centre of the town with no properties directly on it (provisions were made to upgrade it to dual carriageway if required, but the town did not expand as originally envisaged); a roundabout serves the central shopping centre and Park Mains High School. To the north of Erskine the road turns westwards, finally terminating at the twin feeder roundabouts (known as the 'Spectacles') for the only junction of the short M898 motorway, connecting either to the Erskine Bridge across the River Clyde to West Dunbartonshire and the A82, or onto the M8 at Junction 30. The road continues as the B815 into Bishopton where it meets the A8.
