= St Andrew's and St Bride's High School =

Location
- Platthorn Drive; East Kilbride, South Lanarkshire, G74 1NL; Scotland; 55.76204°N 4.16656°W

Information
- Type: Comprehensive School
- Motto: Deus Solem Sufficet, translates from Latin to God Alone Suffices.
- Religious affiliation: Roman Catholic
- Established: 2007
- Authority: South Lanarkshire
- Head teacher: Barry Quinn
- Chaplain: Sebastian Clyde
- Teaching staff: 125 (99 FTE)
- Gender: Co-educational
- Age: 12 to 18
- Enrollment: 1696
- Language: English
- Colours: red, black, purple and blue
- Feeder schools: St Leonard’s Primary, St Louise’s Primary, St Hilary’s Primary, St Kenneth’s Primary, St Vincent’s Primary, Our Lady’s Primary
- Website: st-a-and-st-b.s-lanark.sch.uk

St Andrew's and St Bride's High School is a Roman Catholic school in East Kilbride, Scotland. The current head teacher is Barry Quinn. The school opened in 2007, and has a roll of 1,698 pupils. The new buildings are adjacent to St Bride's Roman Catholic church, built in 1964 by Gillespie, Kidd & Coia. The school and church fall under the Diocese of Motherwell.

== History ==
The school was formed by the merger of two earlier schools, St Brides RC High School originally located at the Platthorn Drive site, and St Andrews RC High School located at Scholar's Gate in the Greenhills area of East Kilbride.

Opened in 1956 as a junior secondary and primary school, St Bride's was located close to the town centre consisting of one main building, with a separate Art block and three technical blocks. The advent of comprehensive education in 1967, meant that Catholic pupils would attend the school, as there would be no qualifying examination for senior secondary schools and so a further Science block and a Technical Block were built in 1970 and a large "New Block" with a Business studies block were opened in 1971. Later, in 1975/6 a large P.E.Block was built to complete the campus. At its largest, around 1977, the school was second largest in Scotland, with 2,220 pupils, but the opening of St. Andrew's High in 1978 reduced this. It was a state comprehensive mixed gender school with 893 pupils aged 12–18 years (1999 data).

In 1975 St Brides RC High School exceeded the capacity of its Platthorn Drive campus and as an interim measure took over the buildings of the then closed Old High School located at Old Mill Road in the East Mains area approximately one mile from the Platthorn Drive campus. This annex site was used to house the first-year intake for 1975, 1976 & 1977. The Old Mill Road site is now part of the South Lanarkshire College.

South Lanarkshire Council were accused of threatening academic standards by choosing to merge two academically very different schools. In 2002 St Bride's came 24th for Higher results in the national league table of 350 schools, while St Andrew's came in 227th place.

== Catchments ==
There are currently 6 primary schools who are associated with St Andrew's and St Bride's:

- St Hilary's Primary School in St Leonards, East Kilbride
- St Leonard's Primary School in St Leonards, East Kilbride
- St Kenneth's Primary School in West Mains
- Our Lady of Lourdes Primary School in Westwood
- St Louise Primary School in The Murray
- St Vincent's Primary School In Greenhills

== Alumni ==
St. Bride's High School

- Liam Fox (b. 1961) - GP, Conservative Party politician, Secretary of State for International Trade (2016-2019), Secretary of State for Defence (2010-2011), Member of Parliament (MP) for North Somerset (1992- )
- Vincent Deighan (b. 1968) - better known by the pen name Frank Quitely, comic book artist.
