= Birniehill =

Area of East Kilbride, Scotland

Coordinates: 55.75°N 04.16°W

- Location within South Lanarkshire
- OS grid reference: NS6453
- Council area: South Lanarkshire
- Lieutenancy area: Lanarkshire
- Country: Scotland
- Sovereign state: United Kingdom
- Police: Scotland
- Fire: Scottish
- Ambulance: Scottish

Birniehill is an area of the Scottish new town East Kilbride, in South Lanarkshire. It lies southeast of the Town Centre, south of St Leonards and northeast of The Murray.

The northbound exit of Birniehill roundabout (which in common with four others in the centre of East Kilbride has underpasses for pedestrians and cyclists at each corner and a sunken landscaped area at its centre) is the start point of the A725 road (known as the 'Kingsway' within the town) which continues north and then east towards Hamilton and the M74 motorway; the east/west exits of the roundabout are the 'Queensway' (A726) which connects the town to Strathaven further south and to the towns of East Renfrewshire further west. The southbound exit leads on to the site of the National Engineering Laboratories, once home to a small nuclear reactor; the site is better known in current times as the Scottish Enterprise Technology Park. nearby further east is the campus of South Lanarkshire College, completed in 2008.
