= West Mains, East Kilbride =

Suburb of East Kilbride, South Lanarkshire, Scotland

Coordinates: 55°45′48″N 4°10′56″W

West Mains is an area of East Kilbride in South Lanarkshire, Scotland.

A residential area in the northwest of the town, West Mains borders College Milton (an industrial estate), the Village, Stewartfield and East Mains. The southern boundary is the Queensway (A726) bypass road, with the neighbourhoods of Westwood and The Murray on the opposite side connected via a pedestrian footbridge and an underpass respectively. East Kilbride railway station falls under the district, and some streets are within walking distance of the town centre.

Prior to its development as part of East Kilbride new town in the 1950s, the area was farmland. The oldest houses in the neighbourhood are on Dryburgh Hill (previously associated with Kirkton Mains Holme farm) and Creighton Grove (once Brousterland Farm).

There are two primary schools in the area - Kirktonholme and St Kenneth's; both were rebuilt between 2009 and 2010 as part of the local authority's programme. There is a specialised Additional Support Needs facility named West Mains School, but since 2017 its campus has been in East Mains. The local church (aligned with the Free Church of Scotland) is located on Blacklands Road.
