= Hairmyres =

Neighbourhood of East Kilbride, Scotland

Coordinates: 55°45′26″N 4°13′41″W

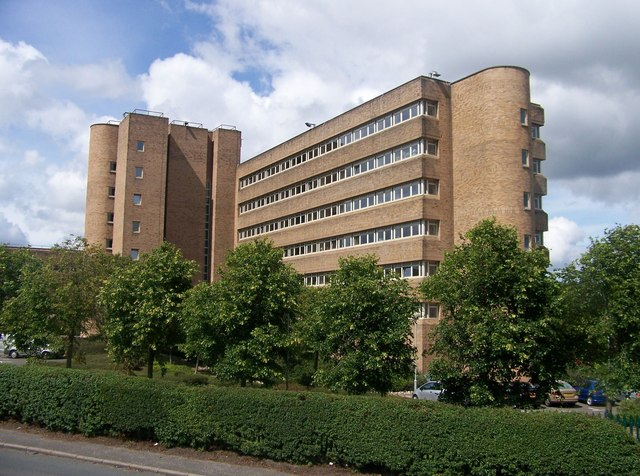
Foreign, Commonwealth and Development Office main building (Abercrombie House)

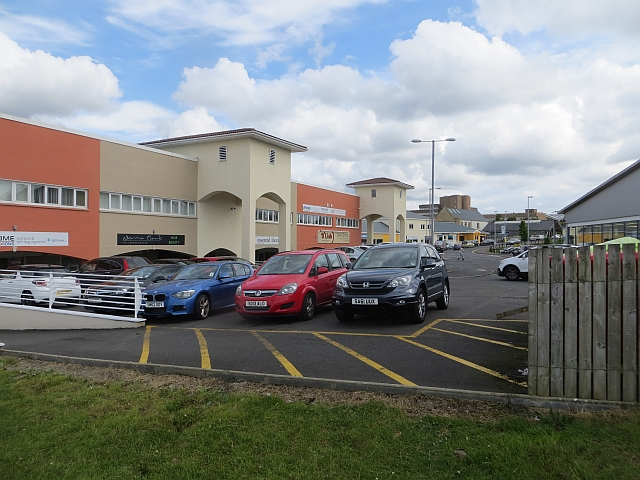
St James Retail Park

Hairmyres is an area of the town of East Kilbride in South Lanarkshire, Scotland. It is situated on the west side of the town, on the historical main road to Eaglesham and Kilmarnock. Nearby roads connect Hairmyres to the major A726 Queensway/Glasgow Southern Orbital dual carriageway. It is 2 1/4 miles (3.5 kilometres) from the Glasgow City Council boundary at the Carmunnock Bypass and nine miles (fourteen kilometres) south of the city centre of Glasgow. Neighbouring areas include Gardenhall, Mossneuk, Jackton, Peel Park, and Westwood.

Falling under the council's East Kilbride West ward, it gives its name to University Hospital Hairmyres, the general hospital for the town and surrounding area which originally opened in 1904, long before East Kilbride was developed as a new town after World War II. The district railway station (on the branch of the Glasgow South Western Line) was originally at the bottom of the hospital access road; trains are operated on a half-hourly basis by ScotRail to Glasgow Central and East Kilbride. In 2024, construction began on a new station to replace Hairmyres, 600m to the west, which took the Hairmyres name once finished in 2025.

Next to the old Hairmyres Station is Abercrombie House, one of the headquarters of the Foreign, Commonwealth and Development Office. The building originally belonged to the Overseas Development Administration, which relocated part of its operations here in 1981 as part of a government initiative to create employment in a region subject to major job losses following years of industrial decline.

The area now has a small shopping area known as the St James Retail Park. It is easily identifiable by its yellow and orange coloured walls. It hosts a few services such as eateries, a hairdresser and a vet.
