= A725 road =

Road in Scotland

A725

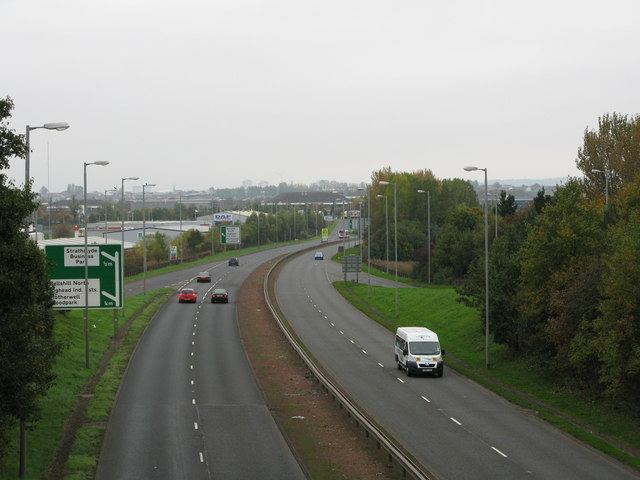
- The A725 at Bellshill Bypass

Route information
- Length: 11.0 mi (17.7 km)

Major junctions
- Northeast end: Coatbridge
- Southwest end: East Kilbride

Location
- Country: United Kingdom
- Constituent country: Scotland

Road network
- Roads in the United Kingdom; Motorways; A and B road zones
| ← A724 | → A726 |

The A725 road in Scotland is a major route which is a trunk road dual carriageway for almost its whole length, connecting several of the large towns of North Lanarkshire and South Lanarkshire, linking the M8 and M74 motorways; it has been upgraded frequently since its construction, with the most recent major work completed in 2017. In combination with the A726 road which meets the M77 motorway, it forms a southern and eastern bypass for the city of Glasgow.

== Route and history ==
=== Bellshill Bypass ===
The northern section of the A725 begins to the east of Glasgow in Coatbridge town centre where it meets the A89; it runs south through the Whifflet and Shawhead neighbourhoods, then links with the A8 and M8 (Junction 7A) in a complex, partially grade-separated junction at Shawhead (onto motorway from A725 northbound only and onto M8 eastbound lanes only; off motorway from M8 westbound only and onto A725 southbound only, with full access provided via J7 Eurocentral) and travels south past Bellshill, flanked by two large industrial estates that have a dedicated exit, with additional exits at Belziehill for central Bellshill and Viewpark (A721), and for Orbiston. This was the first section of the route to be developed, completed in 1968. It links with the M74 at Junction 5 (Raith Interchange) near Strathclyde Country Park, in a triple-layer junction with a stacked roundabout.

The Raith Interchange was considerably upgraded between 2014 and 2017 to address traffic congestion issues, with the A725 – which previously directed all its traffic onto a roundabout – now running beneath the junction and only those vehicles changing route required to join the roundabout; however, there are still no direct slip roads between A725 and the M74, with all traffic on and off the motorway still required to use the roundabout to some extent. A very short 0.4 miles (0.64 km) section of A-grade dual carriageway, the A7071, was designated to link the new interchange with the existing B7071 Bothwell/Hamilton Road.

=== East Kilbride Expressway ===
The A725 continues as the East Kilbride Expressway, a dual carriageway running south-west around Bothwell, crossing over the River Clyde then immediately dipping under the historic Bothwell Bridge, through High Blantyre (with exits for the A724 (Low Blantyre / Burnbank), Hamilton, and the University of the West of Scotland campus) on to Nerston in the north of East Kilbride. There, it links with the A749 (which runs to Rutherglen and south-eastern Glasgow) at the Whirlies Roundabout – a short spur was constructed between the two roads in the 1990s to bypass the Whirlies and ease congestion (at the same time, traffic lights were added to the major roads joining the roundabout). It then heads south as the 'Kingsway' between the Calderwood and East Mains neighbourhoods towards the town centre and terminates where it meets the A726 (its section within East Kilbride referred to as the 'Queensway') at Birniehill roundabout near St Leonard's.

This southern section was completed in two parts; the 'Kingsway' within East Kilbride was completed as part of the work to transform the small settlement into a New Town in 1957, with the remaining section between the town and the Raith Interchange completed in stages between 1967 and 1983.
