= National Cycle Route 756 =

Long-distance cycling route in South Lanarkshire, Scotland

NCR 756 is a National Cycle route in Glasgow and South Lanarkshire that runs eight miles from Kelvindale to East Kilbride. It opened in 2009 following four years of construction.

== Route ==
=== Kelvindale to Kelvingrove ===
The route starts at a junction with National Cycle Route 754 at the Kelvin Aqueduct, then follows the Kelvin Walkway/Cycleway past Maryhill, Kirklee, Botanic Gardens and Kelvinbridge, to Kelvingrove Park.

=== Kelvingrove to Anderston ===
From Kelvingrove Park the route follows the Sustrans Connect2 Glasgow route to Anderston Cross, where it passes the end of the Anderston Bridge, then crosses the adjacent Stobcross Bridge, to follow a path down to Anderston Quay.

=== Anderston to Shawfield ===
Between Anderston Quay and Glasgow Green the route follows National Cycle Route 75, then crosses Polmadie Bridge into Richmond Park.

=== Shawfield to Cathkin ===
From Richmond Park the route passes Shawfield Stadium, following the Glasgow Road corridor, then passes through Rutherglen town centre. It then runs to the east of Mill Street, passing through Overtoun Park, then climbs up to Cathkin.

=== Cathkin to Nerston ===
From Cathkin, the route runs alongside the A749 dual carriageway to Nerston.

=== Nerston to East Kilbride ===
From Nerston, the route skirts Kingsgate Retail Park then heads down Mavor Avenue to join the course of an old railway line which it follows towards East Kilbride Village, then ends at the railway station in East Kilbride.

== See also ==
- List of National Cycle Network routes
- Sustrans
