= Lindsayfield =

Area of East Kilbride, Scotland

Coordinates: 55.738209°N 4.207869°W

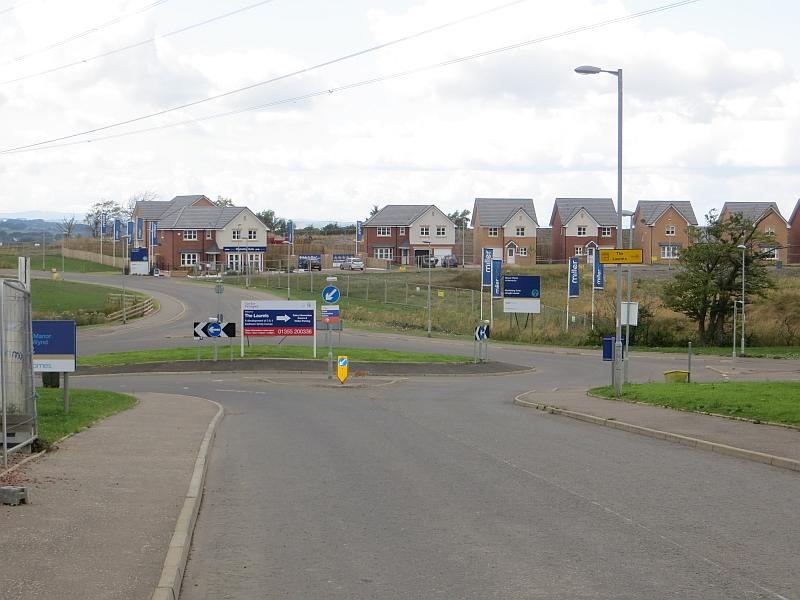
- 2014 image of Mayfield Boulevard, in 'The Laurels' housing estate

- Location within South Lanarkshire
- Council area: South Lanarkshire
- Lieutenancy area: Lanarkshire
- Country: Scotland
- Sovereign state: United Kingdom
- Post town: GLASGOW
- Postcode district: G75
- Dialling code: 01355
- Police: Scotland
- Fire: Scottish
- Ambulance: Scottish
- UK Parliament: East Kilbride and Strathaven
- Scottish Parliament: East Kilbride

Lindsayfield is a residential area in the new town of East Kilbride, South Lanarkshire, Scotland where construction started from the 1990s onwards. The south western area of the development, running alongside Shields Road, sits close to the border with East Renfrewshire.

== Overview ==
Lindsayfield is situated next to the districts of Jackton and Greenhills on the southern flank of the town. The main road around the edge of Lindsayfield extends offering a drive to the villages of Auldhouse, Strathaven, Chapelton and Leaburn. The main road through the area historically ended at a dead end, but in 2023, was extended through to Jackton, to allow for a large new part of the town to be built in the Jackton Community Growth Area. The new residential area will, like Lindsayfield, use the Jackton Road as the boundary, but will also use the Hayhill Road.

Lindsayfield was constructed by a number of major housebuilders, including George Wimpey, Barratt, Lynch, Bellway, Stewart Milne, Cala Homes, Dawn Homes and Persimmon Homes. The area is accessed from either Greenhills Road or Eaglesham Road when in August 2023, Lindsayfield Road was connected to the newly built Newhouse Road, giving direct access from Lindsayfield down to the village of Jackton at Eaglesham Road. Lindsayfield commuters now have a direct route to the Southern Orbital Road and the M77 avoiding Greenhills and Gardenhall where traffic builds up at peak hours and can add up to 10 minutes on journey times.

The new Hairmyres railway station at Redwood Drive is a five to seven minute drive by car and is serviced by the 399 bus service from Lindsayfield at peak times.

Like much of East Kilbride, Lindsayfield is characterised by landscaped open space with some areas divided from one phase of house-building to the next. In the earlier parts of the development (south eastern) running off Cheviot Crescent, Lochranza Drive, Durban Avenue and Pentland Road there are a number of bungalows built alongside detached and semi-detached housing where cul-de-sacs have been thoughtfully landscaped and designed to curve attractively rather than built in straight rows.

Travelling north-west towards the border with the new Jackton development, a few semi-detached and terraced properties can be found off Wakefield Avenue and Applegate Drive alongside the majority of either three, four or five-bedroom detached houses. Again, landscaping has been thoughtfully designed with children's play areas dispersed throughout. Paths to the local countryside have been constructed for easy access, enabling walks or cycle rides to local villages.

Morrisons store and petrol station, sit at the eastern tip of Lindsayfield Road where it meets Greenhills Road. Alongside on Lindsayfield Parade, a number of stores can be found including a hairdresser and several eateries including Costa Coffee. A family style pub, The Oyster Catcher, sits adjacent to the Parade.

Children attend Castlefield Primary School, St Vincent's Primary School or Crosshouse Primary School depending on the catchment area. In 2023, Jackton Primary School opened to the northwest of Lindsayfield in the Jackton development. St Andrew's/St Bride's High School, Duncanrig Sec. School and Calerglen High School (accommodating Sanderson High School) are attended by children in the area. Other options taken by parents include Mearns Castle or the private schools in Glasgow.

== See also ==
- Noddy housing
