= Dylan MacDonald =

Scottish footballer

Personal information
- Full name: Dylan Angus MacDonald
- Date of birth: 19 September 2003 (age 23)
- Place of birth: East Kilbride, Scotland
- Position: Right back

Team information
- Current team: Airdrieonians
- Number: 2

Youth career
- St Mirren

Senior career*
Years	Team	Apps	(Gls)
2022–2024	East Kilbride	63	(2)
2024–	Airdrieonians	47	(1)
- * Club domestic league appearances and goals as of 4 May 2026

Dylan Angus MacDonald (born 19 September 2003) is a Scottish footballer who plays as a right back for Scottish League One club Airdrieonians.

== Career ==
Raised in the Lindsayfield neighbourhood in East Kilbride, MacDonald was a youth player at St Mirren but made no appearances for their senior side – he featured for the Paisley club's B-team in the 2021–22 Scottish Challenge Cup – before being released in the summer of 2022 aged 18.

He was signed by hometown club East Kilbride and was a regular for two seasons in the semi-professional Lowland Football League, culminating in a title success in 2023–24 which provided an opportunity for E.K. to attempt to gain promotion to the Scottish Professional Football League, but they lost narrowly to Stranraer (over two legs, after extra time) in the play-off. MacDonald played every minute of that tie, and individually he did make the step up to the SPFL, moving up three divisions in joining Airdrieonians in June 2024.

After making his debut for Airdrie in the 2024–25 Scottish League Cup (coincidentally against his old club, in an 8–0 victory which contributed to their subsequent qualification from the group stage of the competition), he then scored the winning goal on his Scottish Championship debut and was named Player of the Match as the Diamonds defeated Raith Rovers.
