= Auldhouse =

Auldhouse may refer to the following places in Scotland:

- Auldhouse, Glasgow
- Auldhouse, South Lanarkshire
