= Nerston =

Village in South Lanarkshire, Scotland

Coordinates: 55.785°N 4.165833°W

- Location within South Lanarkshire Nerston (South Lanarkshire)
- Council area: South Lanarkshire
- Lieutenancy area: Lanarkshire
- Country: Scotland
- Sovereign state: United Kingdom
- Post town: GLASGOW
- Postcode district: G74
- Dialling code: 01355
- Police: Scotland
- Fire: Scottish
- Ambulance: Scottish
- UK Parliament: East Kilbride and Strathaven
- Scottish Parliament: East Kilbride

Nerston is a village situated on the northern green-belt boundary of the new town of East Kilbride in South Lanarkshire, Scotland.

== Etymology ==
Nerston is Scots for Near-town.

== Facilities ==
=== Robert Wiseman Dairies ===
The headquarters of Robert Wiseman Dairies - now renamed Müller Wiseman Dairies - has been based in the village since 1959, housed in a former farmhouse and piggery, the original farm and dairy premises founded in 1947 at Murray Farm having been redeveloped by the East Kilbride Development Corporation.

=== Nerston Residential School ===
Nerston Residential School was established in 1940 by Glasgow Corporation as the Nerston Residential Child Guidance Clinic, using houses previously purchased by the Glasgow United Evangelist Association in 1898 for use of the Glasgow Fresh Air Fortnight Committee holiday camps for Glasgow children. The school eventually closed in 2010 as a result of a cost-cutting exercise, the remaining primary children being merged with pupils at Greenwood School and relocated to the former Hampden School premises in Glasgow. The abandoned school buildings were completely demolished in March 2014 to make way for a collection of nineteen 4- and 5-bedroom houses to be built on the site for Cala Homes. Building commenced late in the Summer of 2016 with expected completion early in 2017.

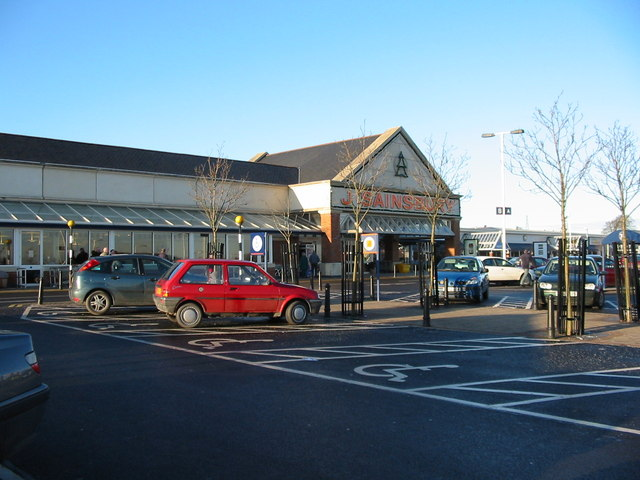
Kingsgate Retail Park is adjacent to the village: J Sainsbury at Kingsgate Retail Park, constructed on the former lands of West Nerston Farm during the 1990s. This location is now a Sainsbury's store.

=== Kingsgate Retail Park ===
Immediately to the west of the present hamlet of Nerston, and upon the lands formerly known as West or Wester Nerston, is Kingsgate Retail Park, first opened in 1995. It grew in popularity when parking charges were introduced for car parks at the town centre. Its location on the A749 road (and bus route) from East Kilbride to Rutherglen and Glasgow also attracts customers from these areas as well as within the town, and is popular for East Kilbride-based commuters returning by car from work in Glasgow who visit the shops on their way home. A second phase of development was undertaken some years after the initial project with additional retail space being constructed to the south of the existing site.

=== East Kilbride Golf Club ===
The East Kilbride Golf Club, founded in 1900, was relocated to Nerston in the late 1960s due to the ongoing expansion of the new town, having been originally located at the East Kilbride Village Show Park and later at Blacklaw where the course extended into Calderwood Estate.

=== Industrial estate ===
Nerston is also the name given to one of East Kilbride's three major industrial estates (the others being Kelvin and College Milton) although it is some way to the south of the original village.

The area was the location of a large Rolls-Royce plant from the 1950s (employing 4,000 workers at its peak) until the 2010s, when the company relocated to more modern facilities in Renfrewshire. In 2016, plans were approved to transform the site into a mixed residential and commercial development; one of the main developments by Barratt Developments, was named Merlin Gardens with street names (Avon Drive, Dart Avenue, Griffon Crescent, Shackleton Drive, Viscount Terrace) invoking the company's products and related aircraft.

=== Sports facility ===
A 21st century development between Nerston and the suburb of Stewartfield is the 90-acre sports complex Playsport which features a 9-hole golf course and driving range, Five-a-side football and indoor skatepark, trampolining and Climbing wall facilities. In 2023, the Playsport Arena opened as a new home stadium for the Caledonia Gladiators, the only professional basketball team in Scotland, with plans to expand the initial 1,600 capacity to 6,000.
