= Kelvin, South Lanarkshire =

Area of East Kilbride, South Lanarkshire, Scotland

Coordinates: 55°44′54″N 4°10′05″W

Kelvin is an area of the new town of East Kilbride, in South Lanarkshire, Scotland.

The area is a large industrial estate in the south-east of the town, surrounded by the St. Leonards, High Whitehills and The Murray residential districts, and Calderglen Country Park. The area is named after Lord Kelvin.

In 1995, several modern units were built and the area was named Kelvin South Business Park with Sainsbury's latterly building a large warehouse/transport depot. In 2008, South Lanarkshire College (previously based at several sites in the area) opened its new centralised campus in Kelvin.
