= Chapelton, South Lanarkshire =

Village in South Lanarkshire, Scotland

Coordinates: 55.712544°N 4.092527°W

Chapelton
- Chapelton in 2021

- Location within South Lanarkshire
- Population: 650 (2020)
- OS grid reference: NS685485
- Council area: South Lanarkshire
- Lieutenancy area: Lanarkshire
- Country: Scotland
- Sovereign state: United Kingdom
- Post town: STRATHAVEN
- Postcode district: ML10
- Dialling code: 01357
- Police: Scotland
- Fire: Scottish
- Ambulance: Scottish
- UK Parliament: East Kilbride and Strathaven
- Scottish Parliament: East Kilbride

Chapelton is a small village in South Lanarkshire, Scotland. The village is located approximately halfway between the towns of East Kilbride and Strathaven, on the A726. It resides in the former parish of Glassford, which takes its name from the nearby village of the same name.

== History ==
In 1854, an archaeological visit to the village indicated that there seemed to have been a chapel on the banks of Chapelton, but no remains of buildings were seen at the spot indicated, except for a font which was dug up there many years previous. Nearby was the chapel well which has since been filled in. The site is known only by tradition. However, more recent excavations have failed to find any remains of this chapel, the site of which is in a cultivated field and is crossed by a cart track. Stones forming the field boundary show no signs of having been worked.

== Governance ==
Chapelton is represented by the SNP MSP Màiri McAllan in the Scottish Parliament as part of the East Kilbride constituency. Within the Westminster parliament, Labour politician Joani Reid represents the areas in the East Kilbride, Strathaven and Lesmahagow constituency.

== Recent events ==
The Chapelton community came together to support the formation of a Bowling Club in 1989 re-establishing, through the Youth Opportunities Scheme, a two rink green in Chapelton Park originally created to benefit returning soldiers from the first World War. In 2003 again with community support a full sized six rink bowling green was constructed by volunteer labour managed and led by John Southern. The new green opened in 2005. The Sixty-Four Thousand pounds project was funded by Sportscotland, The Scottish Executive's Rural Challenge Fund, South Lanarkshire Council and local fundraising. The green has become a well used leisure facility within the village. The Bowling Club Pavilion was refurbished in 2012 with funding support from Virador. This has not only benefited Chapelton Bowling Club but also the many local community groups which can now use the pavilion as a meeting place. The Bowling Club continues to develop as a social sporting club led and managed by volunteers. New members and visitors will be warmly welcomed.

In autumn 2009, there was controversy as one of the village's few amenities, its post office, closed. The postmistress, Jean Craig, retired after 19 years of service. There was particular worry about people having to collect their pension from Strathaven as there is only an hourly bus service through the village, resulting in a two-hour journey at the least if travelling by public transport.

One of the biggest developments in recent years is that of Broadlees Golf. Originally, Robert and Barbara Anderson, farmers who had land on the outskirts of Chapelton, decided to construct a 12 bay driving range on the land. In 2005, this was followed by a café and on 17 May 2009 with a nine-hole golf course. However, planning permission was given by South Lanarkshire Council in 2011 for the family to develop two 4G five-a-side football pitches, an outdoor adventure area, associated gym/dance studio/hall and clubhouse. They have also been given the go-ahead to erect two 30-metre high wind turbines on their land. In addition, there will be a further par-three, nine-hole course to the north of the existing car park which will be designed specifically with junior golfers in mind and will provide an additional golf training facility in addition to the facilities already offered.

== Education ==
The village hosts Chapelton primary school, a co-educational, non-denominational primary school, which has been recently modernised under the extensive modernisation programme by South Lanarkshire Council. The new school opened its doors on 12 November 2010. The school has a small school roll of about 70 pupils due to the small population of Chapelton and surrounding area. The current Headteacher Emma Alexander, who is supported by a number of staff.

== Religion ==
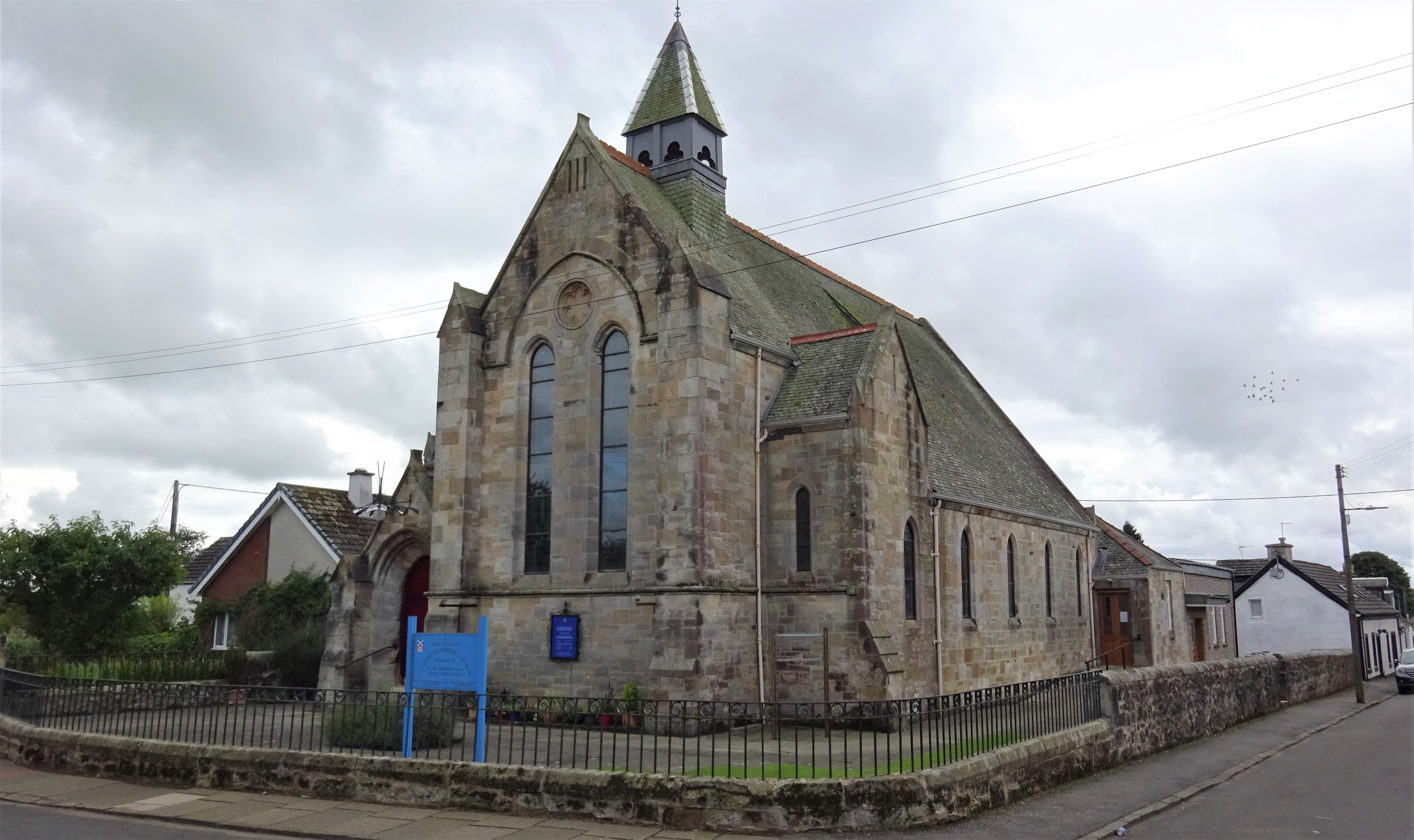
Chapelton Parish Church.

The only religious body now represented in the village is the Church of Scotland, a Christian denomination. Chapelton hosts the Chapelton Parish Church, a congregation which is linked with Strathaven: Rankin Parish Church. The current minister, since 29 August 1991, is the Rev Shaw J Paterson. The church building is constructed primarily from sandstone with a slate roof. Shaw Paterson became the Moderator of the General Assembly of the Church of Scotland for the 2024-2025 session.

By the 1950s the Hamilton Presbytery of the Church of Scotland intended to re-adjust Strathaven: Rankin and had restricted Chapelton's Ministry. Readjustment within Strathaven foundered and in 1957 the Reverend John Heron was elected to be Minister at Rankin Parish Church. Subsequently, when Chapelton became vacant, discussions opened concerning a linkage between Chapelton and Rankin. Both Congregations readily agreed and the Service of Linkage was held in Chapelton on Wednesday 15 June 1960, when Mr Heron was inducted as Minister of the Linked Charge. Today both churches have modernised buildings and halls and active congregations, with a total membership roll approaching 800.

=== Former Faith Groups ===
Formally there has been a Free Church of Scotland and an Evangelical Church in the village. The former Evangelical Church building on the outskirts of Chapelton was granted an application to turn it into a house and to build an extension.
