= East Kilbride Shopping Centre =

Shopping mall in South Lanarkshire, Scotland

Coordinates: 55°45′37″N 4°10′36″W

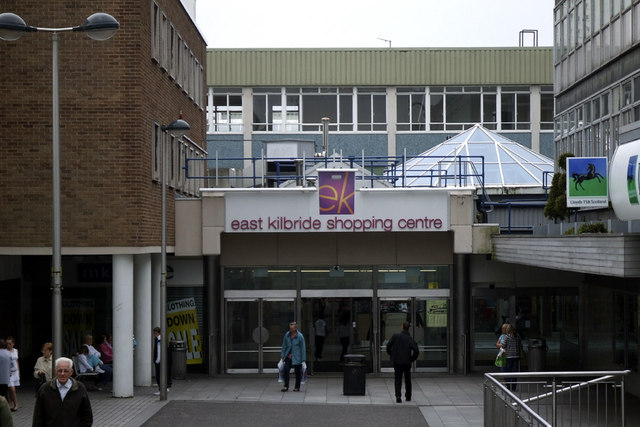
The shopping centre in 2008

EK, East Kilbride (previously East Kilbride Shopping Centre) is located in the town centre of East Kilbride and is Scotland's biggest undercover shopping centre.

== Shopping malls ==
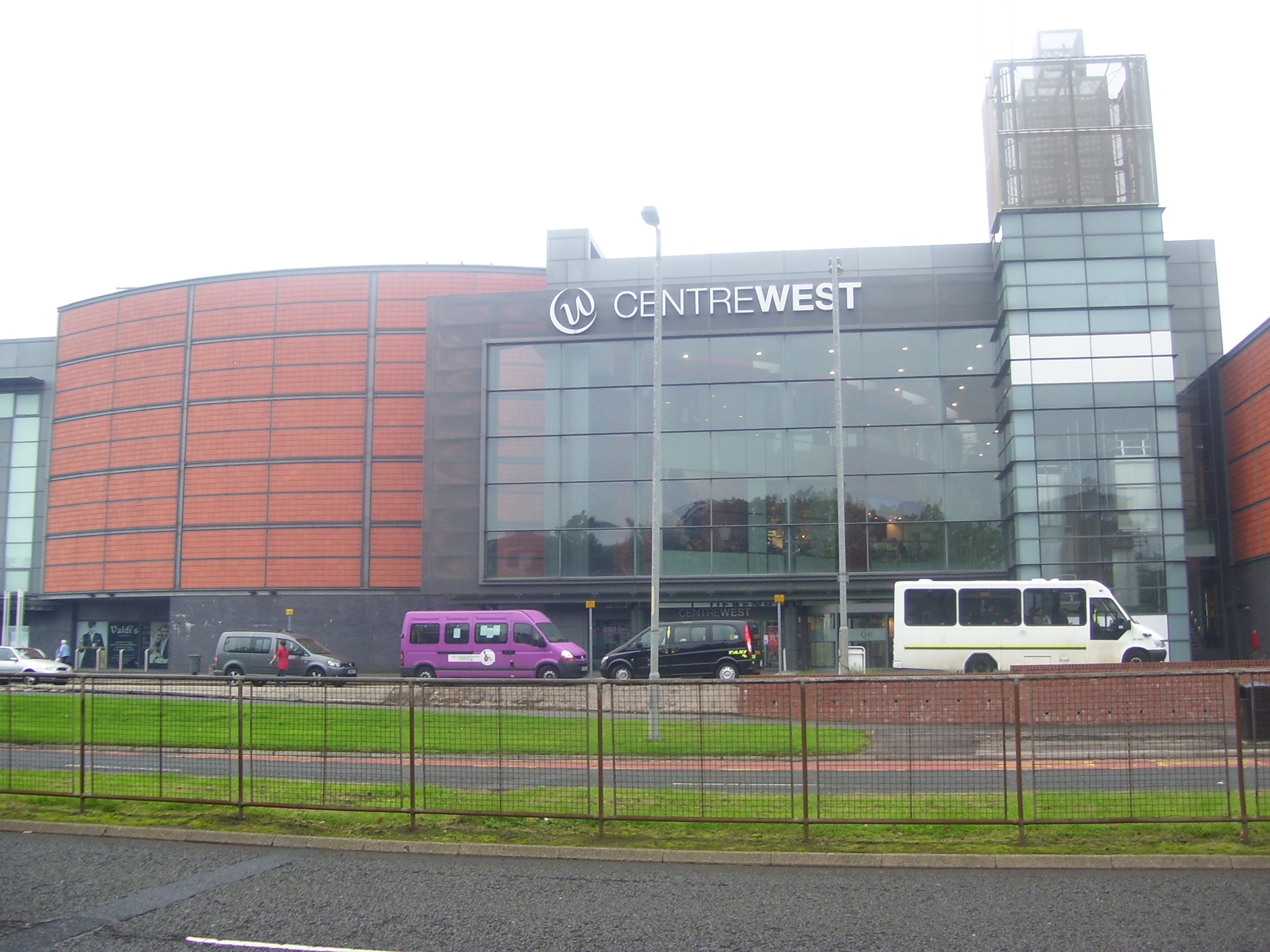
Centre West

EK is made up of five different malls and is now marketed under the EK, East Kilbride brand and comprises the Plaza, Princes Square, Princes Mall, Southgate and the Olympia. The Hub reflects a recreational and entertainments redevelopment within part of the Olympia Mall. These were built at different times, with some being complete builds from scratch and others modified from open-air shopping precincts to roofed-over malls.

=== History ===
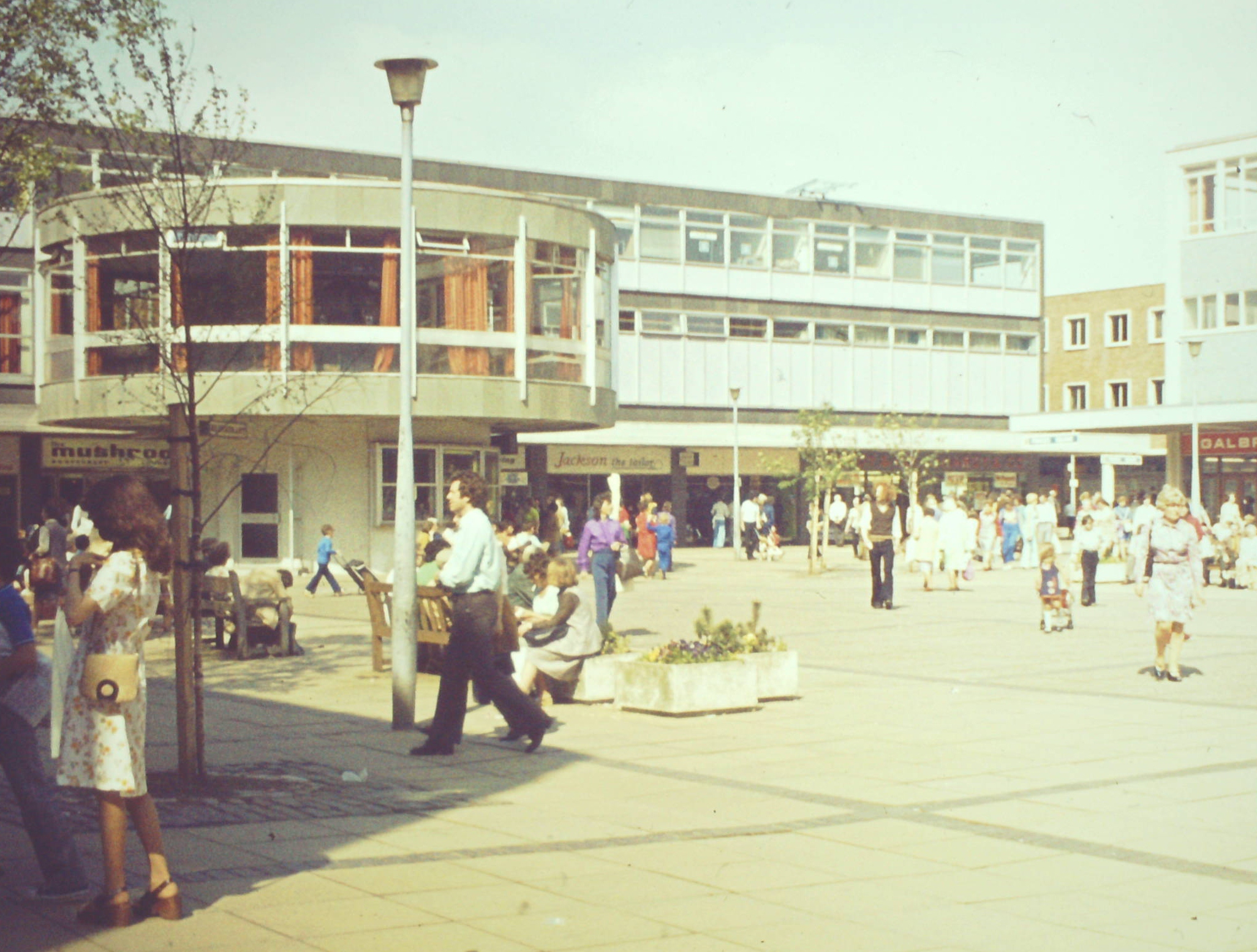
East Kilbride Town Centre 1975

The original part of the Town Centre development opened in 1959, with Prince's Square following in stages into the mid-1960s, and The Plaza commenced in 1971. Other areas of the centre include the refurbishment and roofing over of Princes Street to form Princes Mall (completed 1984) and the same with Prince's Square (completed 1997).

In time for Christmas 1989, the first part of the fourth phase of the Town Centre was opened in the Olympia Centre alias Olympia Mall. It connects with The Plaza via Southgate, which both underwent refurbishment at the same time.

Completed in 2003 and currently under demolition, the "Centre West" section was one of only two areas of the shopping centre where the public concourse was spread over two floors, with Debenhams the largest store having an additional 'second' floor. The Plaza shops are also partly over two floors while the mall corridor element is single-storey. Centre West stands partly on the ground of the former HMRC 'Centre 1' building - Queensway House. The Debenhams store was permanently closed in 2021 as a continuation of its temporary closure during the COVID-19 pandemic. This closure coincided with the closure of all UK branches.

From 2015 onwards, the Olympia Centre underwent partial refurbishment which involved closure of the Food Court and the relocation of a number of stores. The refurbishment works included the addition of a gym and a number of new restaurants and recreation options. This area was rebranded The Hub. In November 2016, the new leisure development is known as "The Hub, EK" opened. In 2021 the anchor Sainsbury's store closed.

== Hotels ==
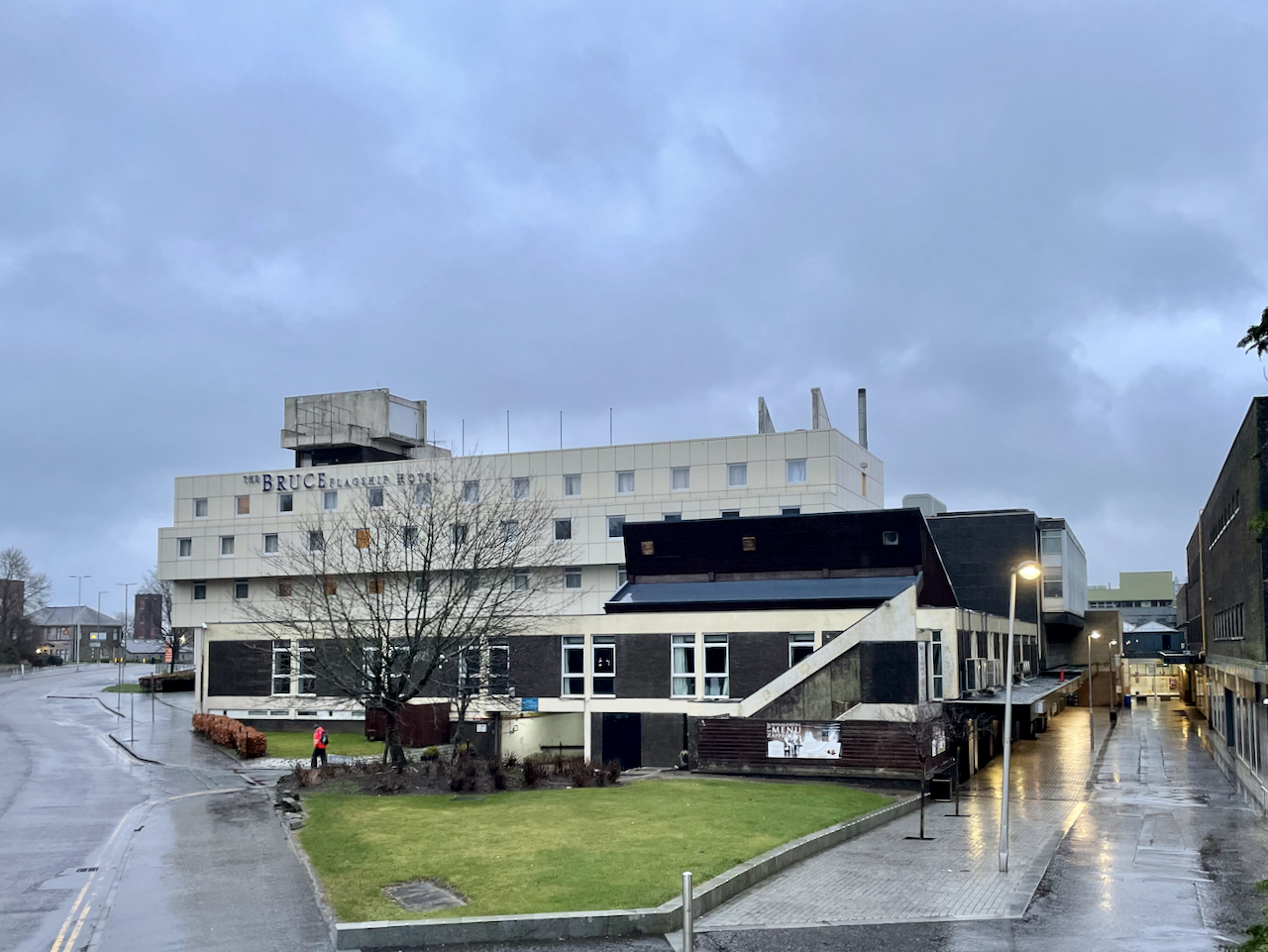
Bruce Hotel East Kilbride, 2022

The Stuart Hotel was the first in the Town Centre and East Kilbride New Town and was located at Cornwall Way. It opened in 1959 by Scottish Breweries Ltd, an early component of what became Scottish and Newcastle Brewers, and was demolished in 2013.

The Bruce Hotel at the junction of Cornwall Street and Righead Gate was opened in 1968 and was designed in the brutalist architecture style by Walter Underwood & Partners which partnered with local consultants.

The Ramada Hotel was opened in 2019 in the top four floors of the Plaza tower.

== See also ==
- List of shopping centres in the United Kingdom
