= Whitehills, East Kilbride =

Suburb of East Kilbride, South Lanarkshire, Scotland

Coordinates: 55.7426°N 4.1811°W

Whitehills
- Location within South Lanarkshire
- Council area: South Lanarkshire
- Country: Scotland
- Sovereign state: United Kingdom
- Post town: GLASGOW
- Postcode district: G75
- Dialling code: 01355
- Police: Scotland
- Fire: Scottish
- Ambulance: Scottish

Whitehills is an area of the Scottish new town East Kilbride, in South Lanarkshire. It is a residential area in the south-east of the town, adjacent to Greenhills. It houses the Ballerup Recreation Area, which includes open land and several football pitches. The site of the former St. Andrews High School has since been redeveloped to create social housing and the Alistair McCoist sports Complex.
