= Stewartfield, East Kilbride =

Area in East Kilbride, South Lanarkshire, Scotland

Coordinates: 55.774°N 4.19°W

The artificial loch at the James Hamilton Heritage Park

Stewartfield is an area of the Scottish new town East Kilbride, in South Lanarkshire.

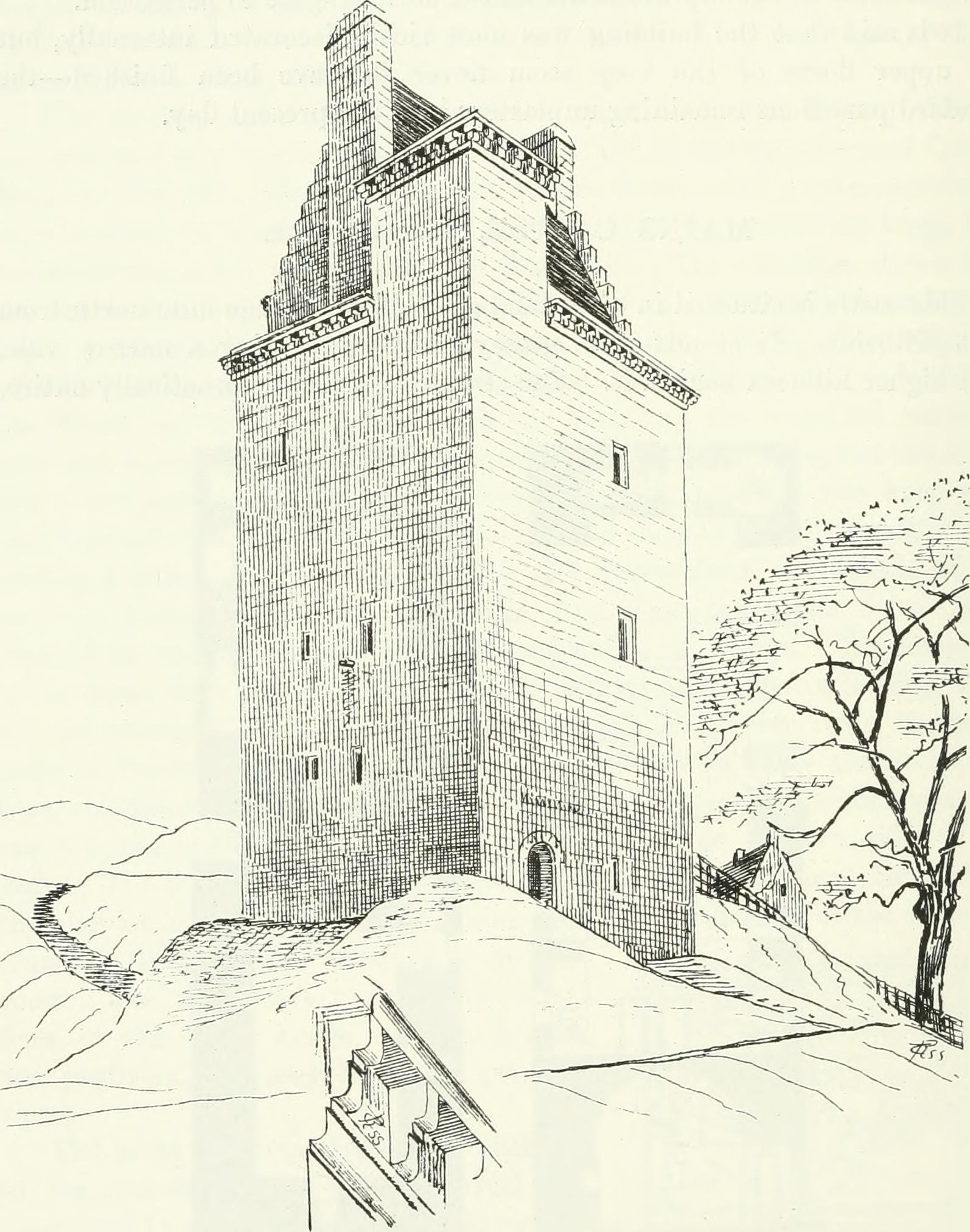
Mains Castle circa 1887

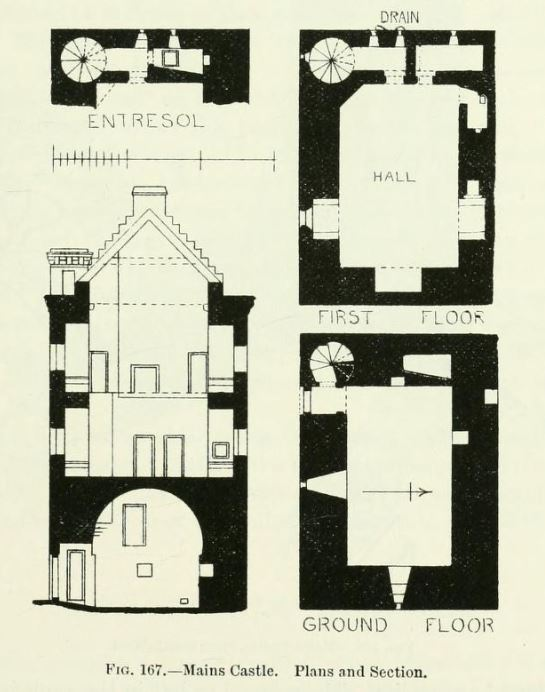
A plan of Mains Castle published in 1887

There are no schools in Stewartfield, although there are two primary schools nearby on its south-eastern edge. These are shared with residents from nearby West Mains. St Kenneth's Primary School was the first school in the town to feature a purpose-built parents' car park. The school has a 3G artificial surface on its football pitch. Stewartfield is part of the catchment area for St Andrew's and St Bride's High School and Calderglen High School, formerly Hunter High School before it merged with Claremont High School.

Stewartfield has a community council and this meets on a regular basis.

Stewartfield is on the northern edge of East Kilbride. Stewartfield is home to the James Hamilton Heritage Park, which includes a man-made boating loch and is overlooked by Mains Castle, a 15th-century Category A listed building. The National Museum of Rural Life may also be considered a part of Stewartfield, although it lies to the west of the main residential areas. Both of these, however, lie north of the Stewartfield Way, the traditional northern boundary of East Kilbride.

A large sign bearing the name Stewartfield marks the area's western and eastern boundary.

== See also ==
- Noddy housing
