= Jackton =

Coordinates: 55°45′02″N 4°14′38″W

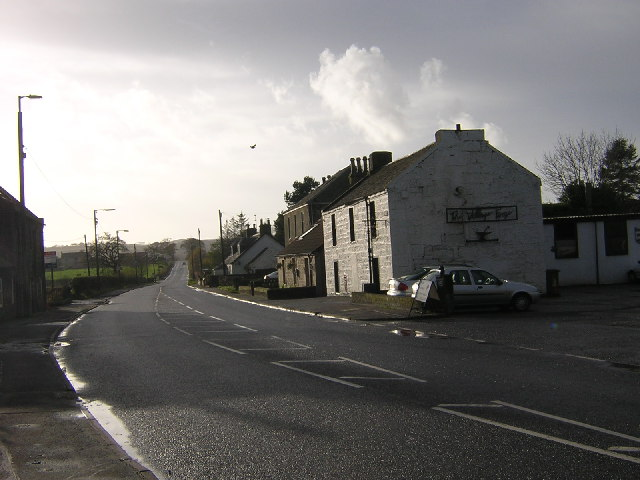
- The main road through Jackton in 2005, prior to its development as a suburb.

- Location within Scotland Jackton (Scotland)
- Population: 100 (before development)
- OS grid reference: NS 592 529
- Lieutenancy area: Lanarkshire
- Country: Scotland
- Sovereign state: United Kingdom
- Post town: GLASGOW
- Postcode district: G75
- Dialling code: 01355
- Police: Scotland
- Fire: Scottish
- Ambulance: Scottish
- UK Parliament: East Kilbride and Strathaven
- Scottish Parliament: East Kilbride

Jackton is a suburban village lying on the western periphery of East Kilbride in South Lanarkshire, on the B764 Eaglesham Road connecting it to the village of Eaglesham. It is also adjacent to Thorntonhall, and the two villages share a newsletter, the Peel News, derived from the name of the road connecting the two. The settlement, as well as an area of surrounding farmland going as far as Lindsayfield was designated as a Community Growth Area for East Kilbride in South Lanarkshire's Local Development Plan 2. The development of new build housing, additional retail locations, and a new primary school are under construction as of July 2025. Jackton lies approximately 150 metres (490 ft) above sea level.

It is also the site of one of the two Scottish Training Centres for Police Scotland. The area is served by Thorntonhall railway station, which is around 1 1/2 miles (2.4 km) away, and Hairmyres railway station, which is around 1 mile (2 km) away.

The Gill Burn runs through the outskirts of the settlement. There is only one bus stop on each side of the road for the village. The only buses running through are the 395/396 run by Henderson Travel.

In 2019 it was approved to build a further 70 homes in the area, consisting of 4 and 5 bedroomed properties. Later, a large Community Growth Area was designated covering Jackton, surrounding the existing village. The development, creating a continuous built-up area over 1.5 square miles (3.9 km^{2}) connecting with Lindsayfield, included a primary school and a new link road. A large roundabout was constructed.

In 2019, one of the streets in the area was the scene of gunfire, which caused a large police presence while it was investigated.

In 2020, Jackton distillery was founded near the village.

The area is represented by the local Jackton and Thorntonhall Community Council. The community lies on the very western edge of South Lanarkshire, near the border with East Renfrewshire, and is part of the UK Parliament constituency of East Kilbride, Strathaven and Lesmahagow, as well as the Scottish Parliament Constituency of East Kilbride.
