= The Murray, East Kilbride =

Suburb of East Kilbride, South Lanarkshire, Scotland

Coordinates: 55°45′23″N 4°10′59″W

The Murray is a pre-designed residential neighbourhood in the new town of East Kilbride, in South Lanarkshire, Scotland; it lies immediately to the south of the Town Centre. It is adjacent to the Westwood and Greenhills neighbourhoods and Whitehills suburb, to the west, south-west and south-east respectively.

== History ==
The Murray was the first self-contained new town neighbourhood developed in the area and as such contains some of the oldest corporation-built housing in the town. However, much of this 1950s-60s housing stock underwent several phases of renovation to improve its condition. Much of the original housing was relied upon by Rolls-Royce Aero-engines as essential accommodation for attracting the workers needed to serve in the firm's factory, which dated to the same period. Among the earliest generations of children to live in the area was the actor John Hannah. Like other original neighbourhoods in East Kilbride new town, it contains a mixture of Modernist groupings of flats laid in geometrical configurations, as well as more traditional tenemental blocks. Streets of Individual houses were developed mostly as terraces and semi-detached pairs. Two larger tower block configurations of flats stand on the northern periphery close to the Town Centre, called Dunlop Tower and Lister Tower.

A major extension was added to The Murray in the mid to late 1960s to form the area often colloquially but erroneously called 'High Murray'. This area is mostly hemmed in by The Murray Road, Kelvin Road, Stroud Road, and Whitehills Terrace.

== Facilities ==
The area is served by The Murray Recreation Area and Headhouse Greenway park, and a neighbourhood 'square' of local shops and facilities. These provide the essential cohort of community offerings. Local, everyday needs are provided by an area of 'local shops' designated under the town's Master Plan. These are located at Chalmers Crescent.

Within the Murray area lies the East Kilbride branch of the Salvation Army and St Mark's Episcopal Church. Until recently, it was also the home of Righead United Reformed Church and the South Parish Church. The latter had served the community since 1954, at first in simple hall-church form, and had to close in early February 2024 due to the building being deemed as dangerous.

== Streets ==
Most of the streets in the area are named after prominent Scots, such as:

- Livingstone Drive: David Livingstone, Christian medical missionary 1813–1873
- Owen Avenue: Robert Dale Owen, Scottish-born U.S. social reformer and anti-slavery campaigner 1801–1877
- Bell Green: Alexander Graham Bell, 1847–1922
- Telford Road: Thomas Telford, engineer and bridge builder 1757–1834
- Liddell Grove: Eric Henry Liddell (1902–1945), athlete
- Dale Avenue: David Dale (1739–1806), founder of the New Lanark Mills
- Slessor Drive: Mary Slessor (1848–1915), missionary and advocate of woman's rights
- Simpson Drive: James Young Simpson (1811–1870), physician
- Carnegie Hill/ Place: Andrew Carnegie (1835-1919), industrialist and philanthropist

Other streets preserve local place-names, such as Freeland Lane, Quarry Park, Lairhills Road, and Todhills South and North.

== Name ==
The definite article in the place-name is well attested. 'The Murray' appears on most maps, developmental records, street signs, and historical literature. This name seems to have originated from the need to distinguish Murray farm (High Murray) from other Murray steadings in the area, but it was also common for most farms in the area long ago to make use of the definite article as part of the normal vernacular style of naming. This usage was retained in the neighbourhood name.
