= Auldhouse, South Lanarkshire =

Coordinates: 55.726°N 4.192°W

Auldhouse
- Village
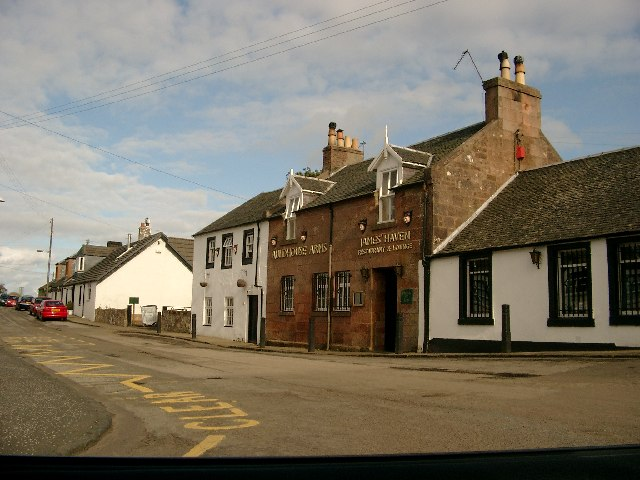
- The inn at Auldhouse, known locally as The Allus Arms

- Location within South Lanarkshire
- Civil parish: Avondale
- Council area: South Lanarkshire
- Lieutenancy area: Lanarkshire
- Country: Scotland
- Sovereign state: United Kingdom
- Post town: GLASGOW
- Postcode district: G75
- Dialling code: 01355
- Police: Scotland
- Fire: Scottish
- Ambulance: Scottish
- UK Parliament: East Kilbride and Strathaven
- Scottish Parliament: Clydesdale

Auldhouse is a hamlet in South Lanarkshire, around 0.5 miles (0.80 km) to the south of the suburban edge of East Kilbride.

== History ==
It is probable that Auldhouse, or Old House, owes its name to an ancient building located there, but the settlement name certainly derives directly from the farm of that name, situated on the northern side of the hamlet. Traditional parish historical accounts, mostly compiled in the 20th century, assert that the settlement owes its origins to meeting of several drove roads in the area. One such road passed through East Kilbride, and passed south via Auldhouse and nearby Fieldhead. However, no true drove roads existed in the area, and map and historical evidence demonstrate that the settlement existed in some form significantly before the creation of a parish or estate road system. So this appears to be folk supposition. Instead, local benevolence by farmer's to create a private school, and the ambition by portioners to create a drinking establishment, may have provided the impetus for proto-urban growth in this location instead of other landward parts of the parish.

Recently, with the development by several housing companies of the Benthall Farm housing estate, the hamlet now lies just outwith the southern suburbs of East Kilbride.

== Politics ==
The area is administered by South Lanarkshire Council, whereas some lower tier local interests are administered by Auldhouse, Lindsayfield and Chapelton Community Council. There are four local councillors who cover Auldhouse; the council ward being Avondale and Stonehouse. Auldhouse is represented in the Scottish Parliament by the MSP Mairi McAllan of the Scottish National Party (SNP) for the Clydesdale constituency, since 2021; and in Westminster in the East Kilbride and Strathaven constituency by Joani Reid (Labour) since 2024.

== Amenities ==
The village contains the Auldhouse Arms public house and Auldhouse Primary School. Nearby is the Langlands Moss Nature Reserve. Langlands Moss, technically outwith Auldhouse, is a lowland raised bog situated to its northeast. It was the first designated Local Nature Reserve in South Lanarkshire and was formally established in 1996.

Auldhouse Primary School has a maximum capacity of 50 pupils, with a current roll of 43. Of the five original village schools in the East Kilbride area, only Auldhouse remains. The Old Village School in East Kilbride closed in 1974 and Jackton School in 1988. Maxwellton Endowed School was sold as a private residence in 1911 and Millwell Endowed School, between Laigh Cleughearn Farm and the Rutherend Toll, was shut down as far back as 1872. However, Auldhouse School did receive a modern extension until 2014, built at a cost of £2.7 million, with the original building retained as the school's gym hall, lunch hall and kitchen.

As of 2015, the average house price value in the area was £133,189.

Auldhouse closely adjoins the older hamlet of Crosshill, which in common parlance is assumed to be integral to the overall settlement of Auldhouse village.
