= East Mains, East Kilbride =

Area of the Scottish new town East Kilbride, in South Lanarkshire

Coordinates: 55°45′53″N 4°10′12″W

East Mains is an area of the Scottish new town East Kilbride, in South Lanarkshire. It lies to the north of the town centre and the Village, between West Mains and Calderwood.

== Geography ==
East Mains is a large residential area, and also the site of the East Kilbride Arts Centre which holds local exhibitions, art classes and hosts showings of music, theatre and arthouse films.

The majority of houses in East Mains were constructed for workers at Rolls-Royce, one of the town's main employers.

== Notable buildings and structures ==
East Mains is home to East Kilbride's oldest surviving house, Rose Mound. Believed to have been constructed in the early 1640s, the house is now owned by a private company who intend to renovate it and transform its grounds into Residential Flats for the Aged.

96-98 Main Street in East Mains is a listed heritage building of former parish council chambers, dating to 1913.

There is a war memorial.
