= Whitelee Wind Farm =

Wind farm in East Ayrshire, Scotland

Coordinates: 55°40′22″N 4°17′08″W

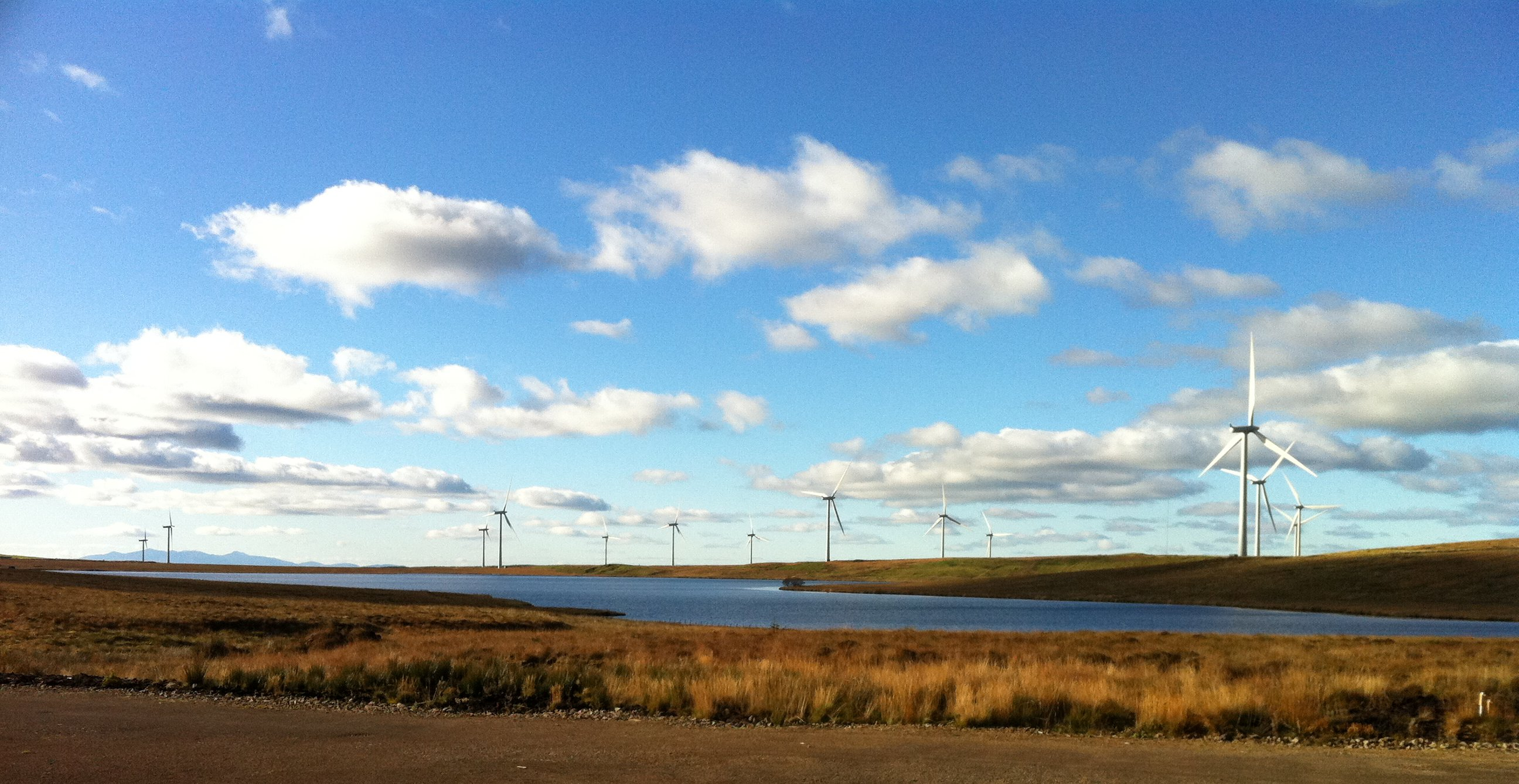
- Whitelee wind farm with the Isle of Arran in the background
- Country: Scotland
- Location: Main entrance on Moor Rd, near Eaglesham, East Renfrewshire. Extends into East Ayrshire and South Lanarkshire
- Status: Operational
- Commission date: May 2009
- Owner: ScottishPower

Wind farm
- Type: Onshore
- Hub height: 65 m
- Rotor diameter: 90 m
- Site area: 55 km^{2}

Power generation
- Units operational: 6 × 1.67 MW; 140 × 2.3 MW; 69 × 3 MW
- Make and model: GE Renewable Energy ECO 100 (69); GE Renewable Energy ECO 74 (6); Siemens Gamesa SWT-2.3-82 VS (40); Siemens Gamesa SWT-2.3-93 (100)
- Nameplate capacity: 539 MW

External links
- Website: www.whiteleewindfarm.co.uk
- Commons: Related media on Commons

Whitelee Wind Farm is a windfarm on the Eaglesham moor in Scotland. The main visitor centre is located in East Renfrewshire, but the majority of turbines are located in East Ayrshire and South Lanarkshire. It is the largest on-shore wind farm in the United Kingdom with 215 Siemens and Alstom wind turbines and a total capacity of 539 megawatts (MW), with the average of 2.5 MW per turbine. Whitelee was developed and is operated by ScottishPower Renewables, which is part of the Spanish company Iberdrola.

The Scottish government had a target of generating 31% of Scotland's electricity from renewable energy by 2011 and 100% by 2020. The majority of this is likely to come from wind power.

== Description ==
Positioned 300 metres (985 feet) above sea level and 15 kilometres (9.3 mi) outside Glasgow, Scotland's largest city, the wind farm has over half a million people living within a 30 km radius, which makes Whitelee one of the first large-scale wind farms to be developed close to a centre of population.

In May 2009, Whitelee was officially opened to the public by Alex Salmond MSP, First Minister for Scotland. However, Whitelee was generating power more than a year before this with the first phase of the wind farm supplying power to the electricity grid in January 2008.

In late 2018 the BBC's Weather World program visited the farm on a record breaking day. Control Centre Manager Mark Gailey stated that the Whitelee would produce 6 GWh that day.

It is estimated that the 539MW of installed capacity at Whitelee Wind Farm can power over 350,000 homes annually.

== Public access and visitor centre ==
Whitelee has become an eco-tourist attraction aided by an on site visitor centre. The visitor centre is host to an interactive exhibition room, cafe, shop and education hub. It was officially opened to the public in September 2009. The visitor centre also gives access to a network of over 90 km of paths for cyclists, ramblers and horse riders. The visitor centre is managed by Glasgow Science Centre and offers activities for education and community groups. There is also a dedicated - free - electric vehicle charging station.

Whitelee wind farm has a Countryside Ranger Service operated jointly by East Renfrewshire and South Lanarkshire councils that works to promote and develop access opportunities for the public within the wind farm and wider area, as well as operating an annual program of free activities and events open to the public. The Whitelee Countryside Ranger Service also works to encourage and assist community and charity organisations to use of access opportunities within the wind farm for fundraising and charity events. The Ranger Service forms part of the Whitelee Access Planning Group which is made up of the wind farm operators, land owners, the three local authorities the wind farm comes within, local community groups and other interested parties to the site.

In January 2014 work began on a purpose built single track mountain bike course at the windfarm, within a hollow created by a former borrow pit that was used to supply stone during construction of the windfarm. This development is being led by East Renfrewshire Council on behalf of the Whitelee Access Planning Group. The track has been designed by Phil Saxena of Architrail Ltd – designer of the 2008 Beijing Olympic and 2014 Glasgow Commonwealth Games XC courses.

The project has followed strong public demand for more technical MTB facilities at Whitelee. Its setting within the UK's largest onshore windfarm will make it unique amongst trail centres. The plans will provide graded trails to suit a wide range of users, from beginners to more experienced riders. The course will offer a mix of route options, technical sections and challenges, as well as a large picnic and viewing area, with wet weather shelters for use by families, clubs, schools etc. The facilities will extend across an area of approximately 12 hectares and will be free to use, 7 days a week.

The site also hosts an annual running event called "Run the Blades", with a 10K, half-marathon and a 50K ultra-marathon distance to choose from.

In June 2012, Whitelee wind farm became the first wind energy project in Scotland to join the Association of Scottish Visitor Attractions. The management took the decision after nearly 250,000 people had visited the site since its opening since July 2009. ScottishPower Renewables said that nearly 10,000 pupils had so far visited Whitelee on school trips. In addition, at least "another 100,000 people had accessed the wind farm's 96km (56 miles) of trails for recreational purposes such as jogging and cycling". By 2020 the onsite visitor centre had more than 700,000 visitors and the increased the length of tracks to 130 km available walk or cycle.

As part of the visitor experience, people can go on a bus tour, visit the exhibition of gift shop, or have refreshments in the cafe.

=== Lochgoin Farm and Monument ===
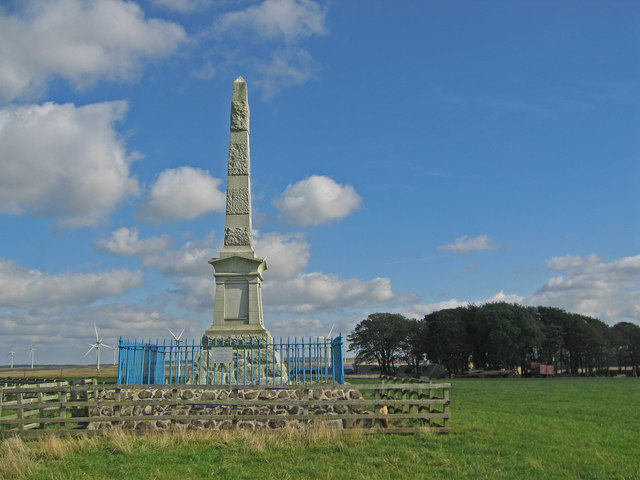
Lochgoin monument and farmhouse

The wind farm area includes Lochgoin Farm, the home of the Howie family which in the 17th century was a noted refuge for Covenanters, and was searched multiple times by government soldiers. In the 18th century John Howie became a biographer who recorded the lives of Covenanting martyrs in books published from 1775 onwards. In 1896 a stone obelisk was erected nearby as a monument "in memory of John Howie, author of the Scots Worthies"; this is accessible by the tracks leading from the visitor centre. A small museum at the farm holds relics of Covenanters, check for opening arrangements.

== Extensions ==
In May 2009, the Scottish Government granted permission for an extension to the wind farm to produce up to a further 130 megawatts of power, which would increase the total generating capacity of Whitelee to 452 MW.

In 2010 a 75 turbine extension commenced, adding an additional 217 MW of capacity, enough to power the equivalent of over 124,000 homes. This brought the total generating capacity of the wind farm up to 539 MW. Additionally, the extension added a further 44 km of trails to the site. John Sisk and Son Limited and Roadbridge were jointly appointed as Principal Contractors for the site during construction with Alstom Limited erecting and commissioning the wind turbines.

In August 2012 Scottish Power announced that it was applying for a further small extension of five turbines on the west of the existing site, adding 12 MW of capacity. This was refused by the DPEA on 19 Oct 2016.

A £21 million (US$29.35 million) 50MW/50MWh grid battery was added to improve resource utilization. This Whitelee Battery Energy Storage System (BESS), became operational in late 2022. The BESS uses lithium-ion battery technology; the same type of battery used in a smartphone. With its 50MW of energy storage capacity it is the largest windfarm battery within the UK and has the equivalent energy storage capacity of almost 4 million smartphones, and similarly, is capable of achieving full charge in around an hour. There are also plans for a 40 MW solar farm and a 20 MW hydrogen electrolyzer.

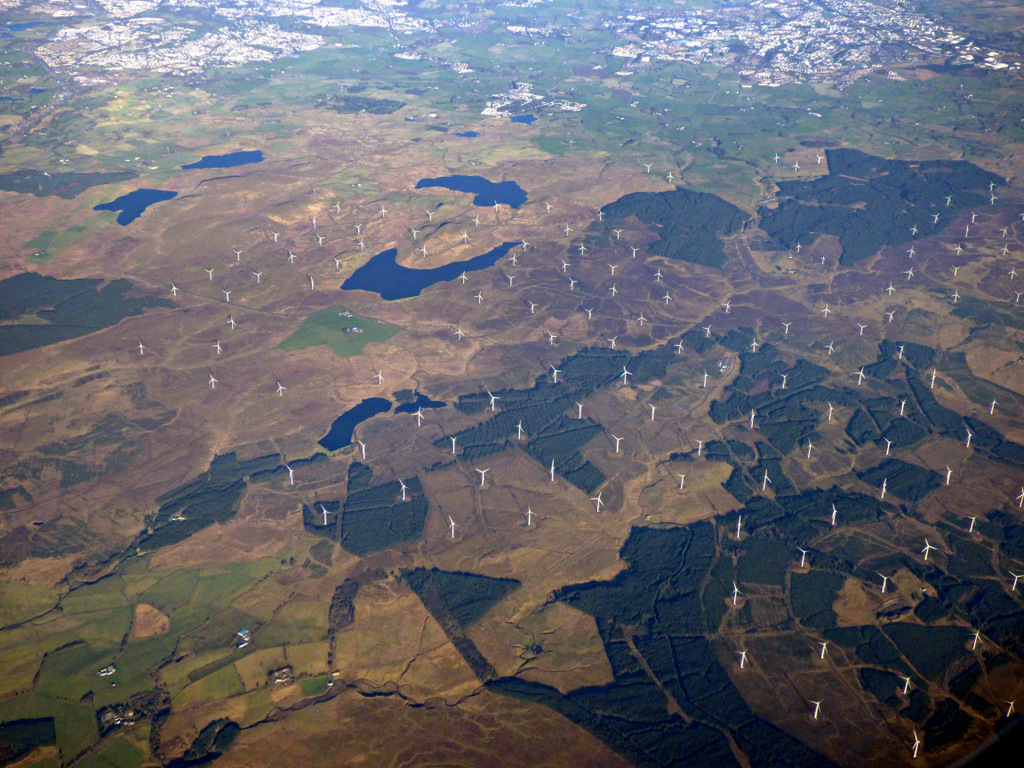
some of the 215 turbines (2019)

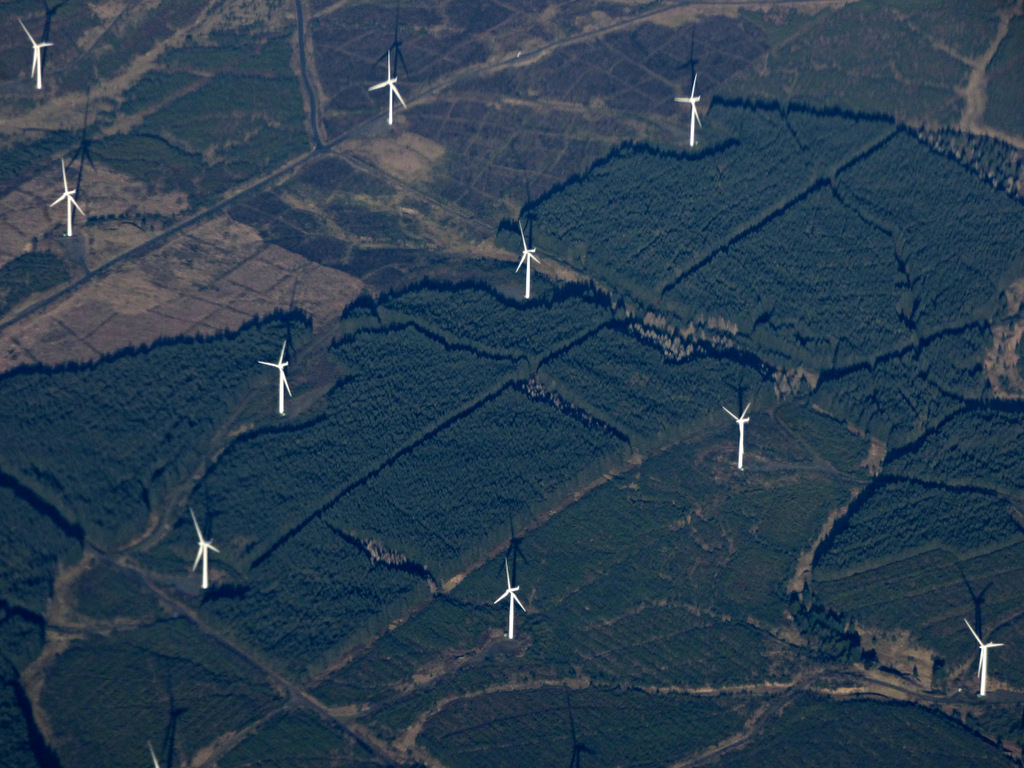
ten turbines (2019)

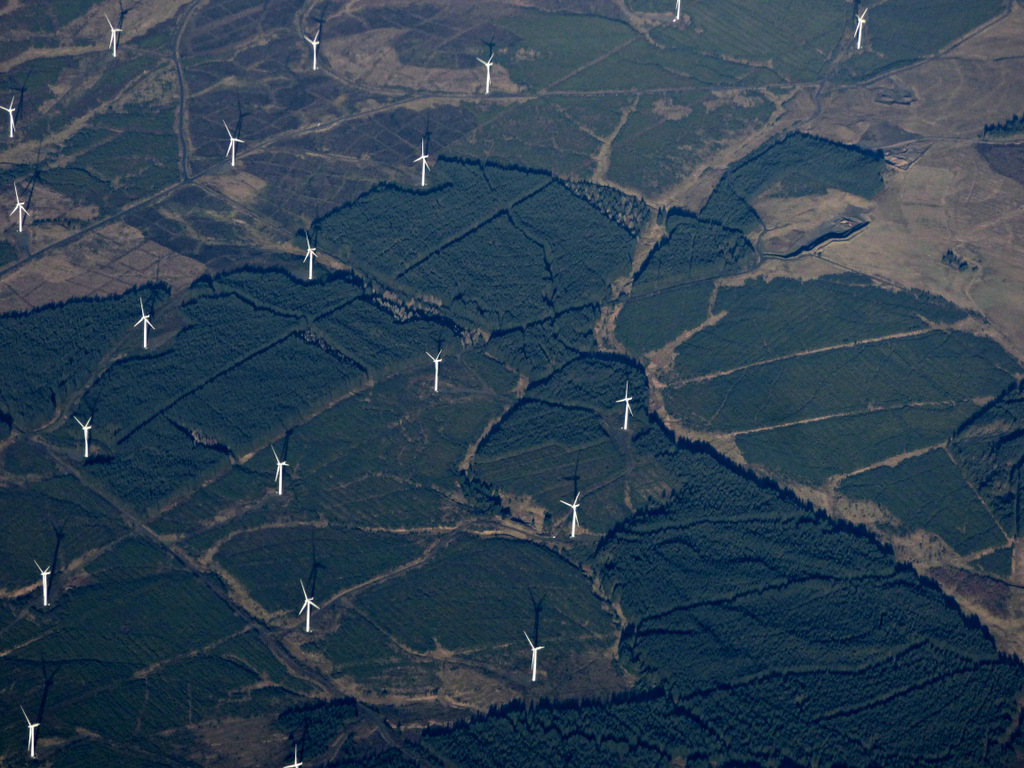
close aerial view (2019)

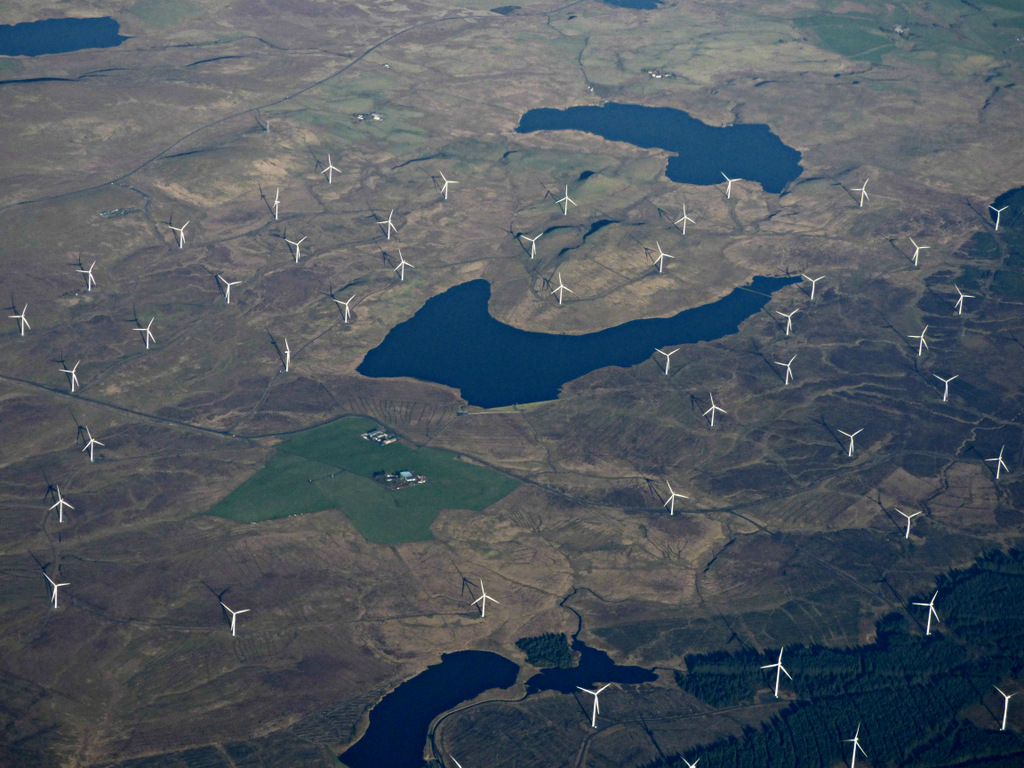
Lochgoin (2019)

== Incidents ==
On 19 March 2010 a blade snapped off a turbine, resulting in temporary suspension of operations while safety checks were completed on all other turbines on the site. Following the accident Keith Anderson, managing director of ScottishPower Renewables, said: "This type of incident is exceptionally rare and highly unusual."

In March 2017 a turbine lost its nose cone, the entire site was closed until such time as the remaining turbines could be checked and tested.

On 29 March 2017 a Spanish worker died falling from a turbine while it was undergoing maintenance.

== See also ==
- Wind power in Scotland
- List of onshore wind farms
- List of science centers#Europe

== Gallery ==
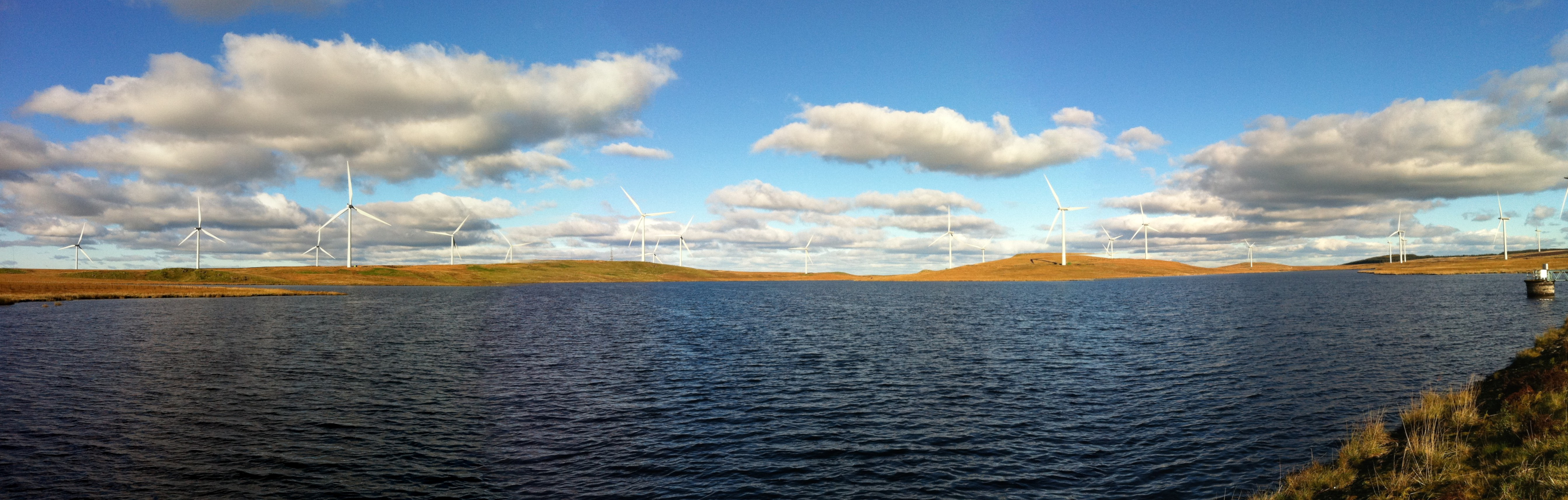
A panoramic view of the Whitelee wind farm with Lochgoin Reservoir in the foreground.
