= South Lanarkshire College =

Educational institution in Scotland

- Type: College of Further Education
- Established: 1948
- Principal: Aileen McKechnie
- Students: 5,000
- Location: East Kilbride, South Lanarkshire, Scotland; 55.7535°N 4.1582°W
- Website: http://www.south-lanarkshire-college.ac.uk/

South Lanarkshire College is a further education institution in South Lanarkshire, Scotland. Its campus is located in East Kilbride, with new buildings completed in 2008 at a site between the town centre and the Kelvin industrial area.

The college was founded in 1948 as a building school in Cambuslang and had several sites for its various departments over its history, including at Blantyre, Motherwell, Hamilton and Wishaw. Its last site in Cambuslang was at the former Gateside School which dated from the 1880s, but was demolished soon after the college relocated entirely to East Kilbride.

In 2019, the college was chosen as the site for a monument to the workers at the nearby, recently closed Rolls-Royce engineering works who refused to fix military aircraft engines used by the Pinochet regime of Chile in the 1970s (detailed in the documentary movie Nae Pasaran); the monument itself is one of the engines sent to the factory which was never used again.
