= East Kilbride =

Town in South Lanarkshire, Scotland

Coordinates: 55°45′52″N 04°10′37″W

East Kilbride: Scottish Gaelic: Cille Bhrìghde an Ear
- Town
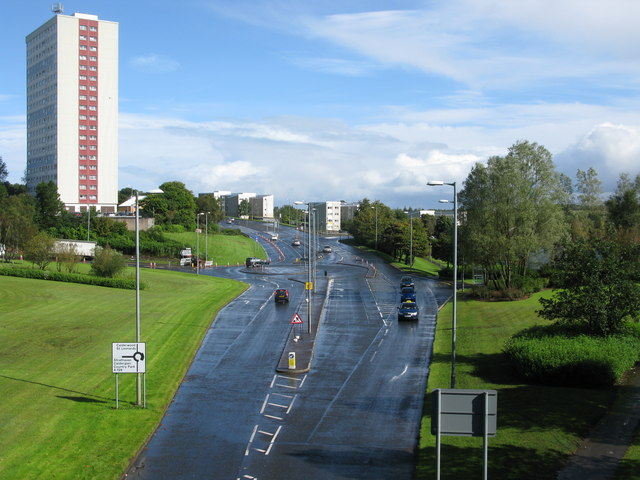
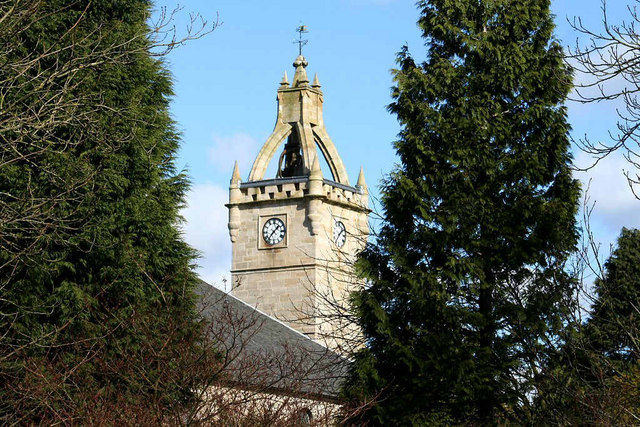
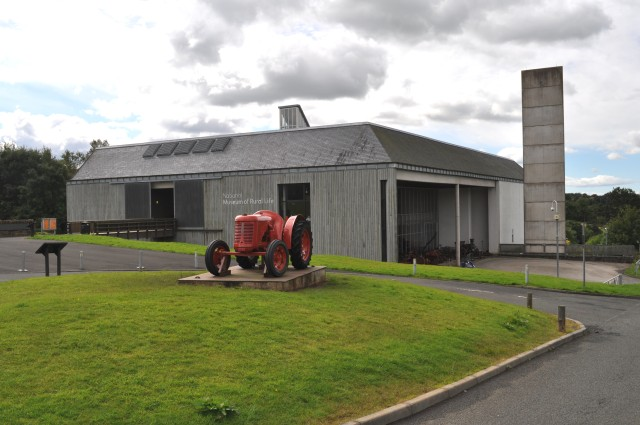
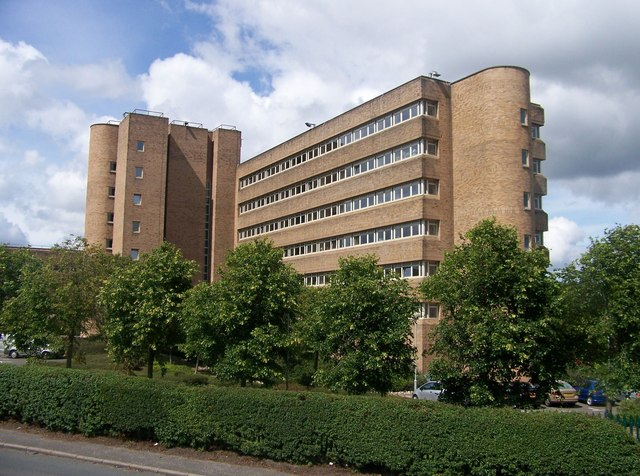
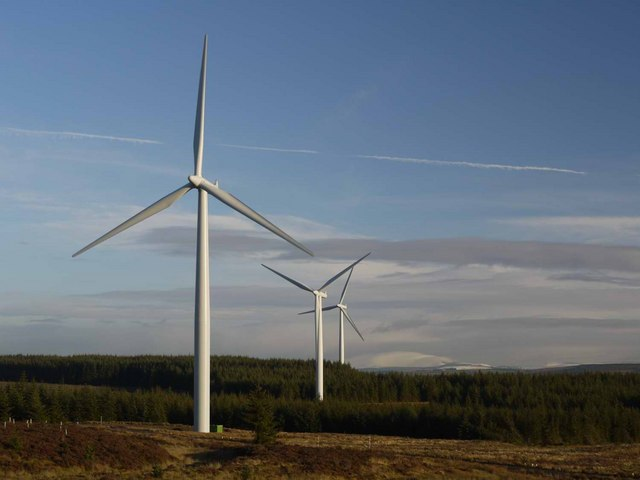
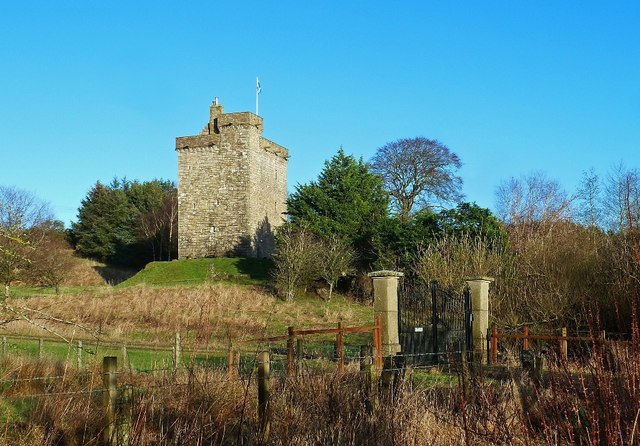
- From left to right: High Common Road, Old Parish Church tower, National Museum of Rural Life, Foreign, Commonwealth and Development Office, Whitelee Wind Farm, Mains Castle

- Location within South Lanarkshire East Kilbride (South Lanarkshire)
- Population: 76,607 (2022)
- OS grid reference: NS635545
- Council area: South Lanarkshire
- Lieutenancy area: Lanarkshire
- Country: Scotland
- Sovereign state: United Kingdom
- Post town: GLASGOW
- Postcode district: G74, G75
- Dialling code: 01355
- Police: Scotland
- Fire: Scottish
- Ambulance: Scottish
- UK Parliament: East Kilbride and Strathaven

East Kilbride (/ ... kɪlˈbraɪd/; Scottish Gaelic: Cille Bhrìghde an Ear [ˈkʲʰiʎə ˈvɾʲiːtʲə əɲ ˈɛɾ]), often referred to as EK, is the largest town in South Lanarkshire in Scotland, and the country's sixth-largest locality by population, with 76,607 inhabitants in 2022. Historically a small village, it was designated Scotland's first "new town" on 6 May 1947, and thereafter widely expanded. The area lies on a raised plateau to the south of the Cathkin Braes, about eight miles (thirteen kilometres) southeast of Glasgow and close to the boundary with East Renfrewshire.

The town ends close to the White Cart Water to the west and is bounded by the Rotten Calder Water to the east. Immediately to the north of the modern town centre is The Village, the part of East Kilbride that existed before its post-war development into a New Town. East Kilbride is twinned with the town of Ballerup, in Denmark.

== History ==
=== Prehistory ===
The earliest-known evidence of occupation in the area dates as far back as the late Neolithic and Early Bronze Age, as archaeological investigation has demonstrated that burial cairns in the district began as ceremonial or ritual sites of burial during the Neolithic, with the use of cup-marked, and other inscribed stones at key elevated sites, only to be later built upon with earth and re-used for burial into the Bronze Age.

These findings have found further support through ongoing research indicating that many East Kilbride Cairns first noticed by the Reverend David Ure in his History of Rutherglen and East Kilbride (1793), are embedded, alongside other monuments, into a ritual landscape related to ancestor cults and relationships with key topographical features and annual solar events. A flint arrow head was discovered by Allan Forrest, a then child resident whilst groundworks were taking place in his family's garden at Glen Bervie, St Leonards in 1970 which later was identified as dating to 1500 BC (Bronze Age).

Prehistoric – possibly Roman – graves have also been found near the Kype Water close to the town of Strathaven, some distance from East Kilbride but suggesting a Roman context for the wider area. Roman coins, footwear, and a Romano-British oil lamp have also been found in the area.

=== History ===
East Kilbride traditionally takes its name from an Irish saint named St Bride (or Brigit), who may have founded a monastery for nuns and monks in Kildare in Leinster, Ireland, in the 6th century. Dál Riatan monks afterwards introduced her order to parts of Scotland, although the origins of the East Kilbride example - situated in the West of Scotland, is less certain due to a lack of early historical or linguistic involvement with Dalriada.

The Scots anglicisation kil takes its root from the Gaelic cille, borrowed from the Latin for cell or chapel, of St Brigit. The use of cille to mark a probable dedication to an Irish saint in this part of Scotland is problematic due to linguistic dating issues, but some analysis suggests that churches with cille place-names in the south west represent an early and short-lived influx of Irish church influence in or before the eighth century, which may or may not have involved the Céilí Dé who were monastics. However, it has been suggested by Prof. T. O. Clancy and others that cille place-names in the region, including the East Kilbride example, may instead relate to the main period of Gaelic cultural influx in the period post 900 AD.

The original parish church was located on what may have been a site of a pre-Christian significance, and tentatively the origin of the association with St Brigit, since the site may be dedicated to the Celtic goddess Brigid, whose traditions have been continued through the reverence of St Brigit brought on by the Celtic Church. However, this view is unpopular amongst academic audiences due to a complete lack of evidence supporting such earlier origins, thus making it an unfalsifiable concept.

Alternatively, the later dedication may commemorate the Scottish St Bryde, who is alleged to have been born in 451 AD and died at Abernethy 74 years later. However, this is also the same year Brigit is supposed to have been born, and the same year of her death.

Culdee-type Christian settlements were essential to the spread of the Celtic church in Scotland, with small pagan sites being converted and chapels or cells forming little more than crude shelters, or timber and turf buildings with crude circular enclosures. Additionally, the number of place-name dedications to St. Brigit in Scotland is further evidence of the possibility of Culdee activity in the southwest, if extrapolations are allowed from known areas of culdee activity. How this possibility relates to the relatively late dating-periods in the British kingdom of Strathclyde has not been explored owing to a lack of surviving written sources to provide insights for this geographical area.

=== Contemporary history ===
In the early 18th century, the word 'East' was added to the name of East Kilbride, and 'West' to West Kilbride to distinguish the towns from each other.

East Kilbride grew from a small village of around 900 inhabitants in 1930 to become a large burgh in 1967. The rapid industrialisation of the 20th century underpins this growth and left much of the working population throughout Scotland's Central Belt, from Glasgow to Edinburgh, living in the housing stock built at the end of the previous century. The Great War postponed any housing improvements, as did the Treaty of Versailles and the period of post-war settlement it created. In turn, this was followed by the Great Depression. After the Second World War, Glasgow, already suffering from chronic housing shortages, incurred bomb damage from the war. In 1946, the Clyde Valley Regional Plan allocated sites where overspill satellite "new towns" could be constructed to help alleviate the housing shortage. Glasgow would also undertake the development of its peripheral housing estates. East Kilbride was the first of six new towns in Scotland to be designated, in 1947, followed by Glenrothes (1948), Cumbernauld (1956), Livingston (1962), Irvine (1964) and Stonehouse (1972), although Stonehouse new town was never built.

The planned town has been subdivided into residential precincts, each with its own local shops, primary schools and community facilities. The housing precincts surround the shopping centre, which is bound by a ring road. Industrial estates were concentrated on the outskirts of the town in northern, western and south-eastern directions (Nerston, College Milton and Kelvin respectively).

The Calderglen gorge bordering the eastern fringe of East Kilbride, was celebrated in a high number of printed works as a picturesque forest and 'magnificent in its grouping of craggy heights, sprinkled with trees and [...] the richly wooded and festooned valley', and with 'delightful cascades', and described as indescribable, or as 'the GRAND, the ROMANTIC, and BEAUTIFUL' –- the latter being the only part of David Ure's book where he emphasised the descriptive characteristics of a place in bold characters. The northern part of the gorge and adjoining Calderwood, the gorge's namesake, was the home of an ancient family known as the 'Maxwells of Calderwood' who resided in Calderwood Castle, and were the oldest branch of the Maxwells of Pollok. The remnants of Calderwood Castle were demolished in 1951 and only a few parts of the structure remain. Calderglen Heritage formally constituted in early 2017 as a body to protect, record, and restore local and national interest in the areas of the former Calderwood and Torrance estates of Calderglen.

The story of how workers at the Rolls-Royce factory in East Kilbride prevented engines for military jets being serviced and supplied between 1974 until 1978 to the Chilean military dictatorship is told in the 2018-released documentary, Nae Pasaran. The factory was scheduled for closure in 2017 and was subsequently demolished and the land (at Nerston Industrial Estate) used for housing; a monument consisting of one of the unrepaired engines was installed at the town's South Lanarkshire College in 2019.

== Geography ==
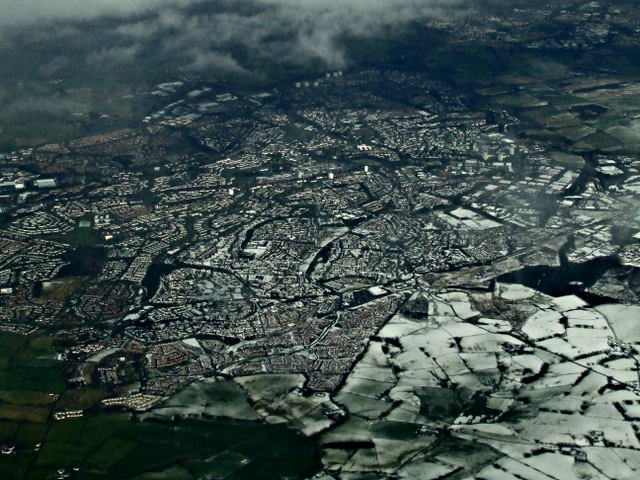
East Kilbride from the air, 2015

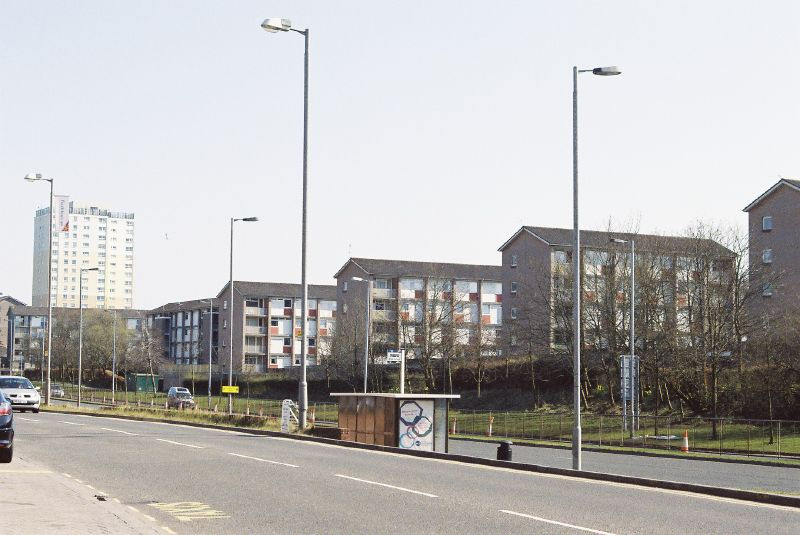
Tenements, tower block and dual carriageway at The Murray, East Kilbride

Hamilton, the administrative headquarters for South Lanarkshire Council, is about five miles (eight kilometres) east of East Kilbride. The A725 road linking the towns also passes Blantyre and one of the University of the West of Scotland campuses, with links to Bothwell, Motherwell and ultimately to the M74 and M8 motorways.

The nearest Glasgow district of Castlemilk is about three miles (five kilometres) northwest, with the Cathkin Braes, farmland and the village of Carmunnock in between; a bypass (the B766) was built in 1988 to remove Glasgow traffic from Carmunnock. Rutherglen and Cambuslang lie about the same distance to the north-east and are linked to East Kilbride via the dual carriageway A749 road which continues into Glasgow.

Clarkston and Busby are also about three miles (five kilometres) northwest via the A727 road, with Thorntonhall much closer. Eaglesham lies about three miles (five kilometres) west of East Kilbride centre; the Glasgow Southern Orbital, another modern bypass which is part of the A726 road, keeps East Kilbride traffic heading for the M77 motorway away from Eaglesham and Newton Mearns.

The closest town to the south of East Kilbride is Strathaven, about 7 miles (11 kilometres) away via another section of the A726. The majority of land in the area in between is taken up by Whitelee Wind Farm on the moorland hills to the southwest, including Elrig close to where one of the principal feeder burns of the Calder Water originates. The Calder itself flows northwards past East Kilbride adjacent to Blantyre, before joining the River Clyde opposite Daldowie near Newton.

East Kilbride is often considered to form part of the Greater Glasgow conurbation. However, the urban area is not directly connected to any other, being designed from the outset to serve as a self-contained town with some commute requirements to Glasgow. The hamlets of Nerston, Kittochside, Auldhouse and Jackton which were once separate settlements are now on the periphery of the expanding town. Statistically, In 2022, it is the sixth-largest locality (a single defined populated place) in Scotland with a population of 76,607, but only the tenth-largest settlement, as these are formed by connected clusters of localities: for example neighbouring Hamilton's settlement – 84,450 (2020) – is combined with Blantyre, Bothwell and Uddingston to exceed the population of isolated East Kilbride, with neither counted as part of Greater Glasgow under this definition.

East Kilbride is divided into a number of smaller neighbourhoods bordered by main through-roads. Part of the new town design was that each of these would be a self-contained entity, with a variety of housing types, local shops and primary schools, and accessed safely for pedestrians via paths and underpasses separate from main roads. This is true for the original areas of the new town (principally Calderwood, Greenhills, The Murray, St Leonards and Westwood) while newer developments, such as Stewartfield, Lindsayfield, Gardenhall/Mossneuk and more recently Jackton do not adhere as closely to this model and have a more generic suburban layout of low-density private housing, arranged mainly in cul-de-sacs fed by distributor roads.

=== Climate ===
Climate data for Paisley, (Note: Weather station is located 7 mi (11 km) from the Glasgow city centre.) elevation: 16 m or 52 ft, 1991–2020 normals, extremes 1959–present
Month	Jan	Feb	Mar	Apr	May	Jun	Jul	Aug	Sep	Oct	Nov	Dec	Year
Mean daily maximum °C (°F)	5.7 (42.3)	6.1 (43.0)	8.3 (46.9)	11.3 (52.3)	14.7 (58.5)	17.1 (62.8)	18.9 (66.0)	18.3 (64.9)	15.5 (59.9)	11.7 (53.1)	8.2 (46.8)	5.7 (42.3)	11.8 (53.2)
Mean daily minimum °C (°F)	0.2 (32.4)	0.3 (32.5)	1.5 (34.7)	3.1 (37.6)	5.6 (42.1)	8.5 (47.3)	10.4 (50.7)	10.1 (50.2)	8.1 (46.6)	5.2 (41.4)	2.5 (36.5)	0.1 (32.2)	4.6 (40.3)
Average rainfall mm (inches)	136 (5.4)	99 (3.9)	108 (4.3)	67 (2.6)	68 (2.7)	73 (2.9)	84 (3.3)	102 (4.0)	111 (4.4)	140 (5.5)	119 (4.7)	122 (4.8)	1,229 (48.4)
Average rainy days (≥ 1.0 mm)	17	14	16	12	12	12	13	14	14	16.2	17	16	172
Mean monthly sunshine hours	36	63	93	130	175	151	153	144	112	80	50	33	1,220
Source: Met Office

== Governance ==
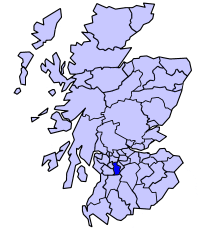
East Kilbride District 1975–1996

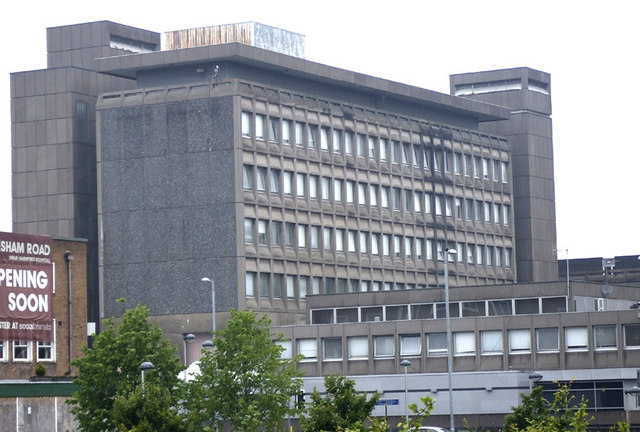
East Kilbride Civic Centre

East Kilbride Civic Centre, which was commissioned by the burgh of East Kilbride was designed by Scott Fraser & Browning, built by Holland, Hannen & Cubitts and completed in 1968. From 1975 East Kilbride lent its name to a local government district in the Strathclyde region. From creation until 1980 the East Kilbride District Council was governed by the Scottish National Party (SNP), subsequently, until dissolution, the district was under the control of Labour. In 1996, administrative functions were taken over by the South Lanarkshire unitary council.

There is an East Kilbride constituency of the Scottish Parliament. From the opening of the Scottish Parliament, the constituency was represented by Andy Kerr MSP (Labour), until May 2011 when the seat was won by Linda Fabiani MSP (Scottish National Party).

East Kilbride was formerly a constituency of the UK Parliament. In 2005 it was replaced by the constituency of East Kilbride, Strathaven and Lesmahagow. The seat was held from 1987 to 2010 by Labour politician, Adam Ingram. In the 2010 election Labour politician, Michael McCann, previously a South Lanarkshire Councillor was elected as the MP for the area. In the 2015 election, Lisa Cameron for the SNP was elected as part of the landslide victory the party had in Scotland, with Cameron, after holding the seat in 2017 and 2019, defecting to the Conservatives in 2023.

This seat was abolished for the 2024 general election and largely replaced by East Kilbride and Strathaven which was won by Joani Reid, the Scottish Labour candidate.

== Economy ==
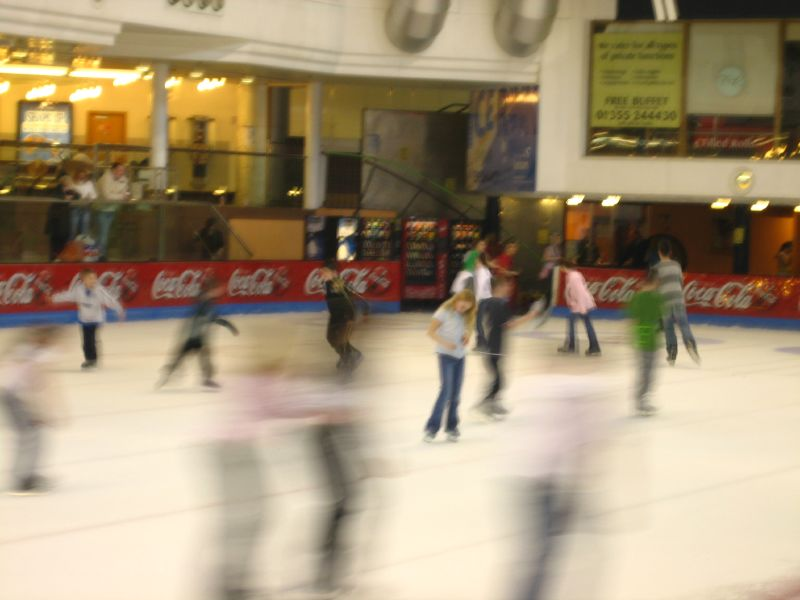
Ice rink within East Kilbride Shopping Centre

The town centre is occupied by a large shopping centre comprising six linked malls (The Plaza (development started in 1972), Princes Mall (1984), Southgate (1989), Princes Square (1997), Centre West (2003) and The Hub (2016)).

A £400m redevelopment of part of East Kilbride shopping centre was approved in 2006 by South Lanarkshire Council. The plan proposed demolishing some existing buildings to create a new civic centre, health centre, library and shopping facilities. The shopping centre's owners went into administration in 2022. There are plans to demolish a large part of the Centre West segment and turn this into housing with the overall retail space to be reduced and new civic amenities to be built.

A branch of the government's Department for International Development, now the Foreign, Commonwealth and Development Office, is located in the western Hairmyres area of East Kilbride.

== Religion ==
There are approximately 30 Christian churches in East Kilbride. This includes nine Church of Scotland churches, three Baptist churches, and four Roman Catholic churches. St Bride's RC church is a category A listed building. St Mark's Episcopal church is situated in the Murray. There is one Lutheran parish of the Evangelical Lutheran Church of England, which is located in the Westwood hill area. An Evangelical Christian congregation is also located in the Westwood area. The Church of Jesus Christ of Latter Day Saints meeting hall is situated in Vancouver Drive, Westwood. Two congregations of Jehovah's Witnesses share a Kingdom Hall near the centre of the town. The Christadelphians meet in Calderwood Community Centre. There are two United Reformed Churches, one in the Village, and one in the Murray. In the Greenhills area is a congregation of the Methodist church, whose premises are currently shared by the Seventh Day Adventist church. An Islamic Centre opened in 2018.

== Transport ==
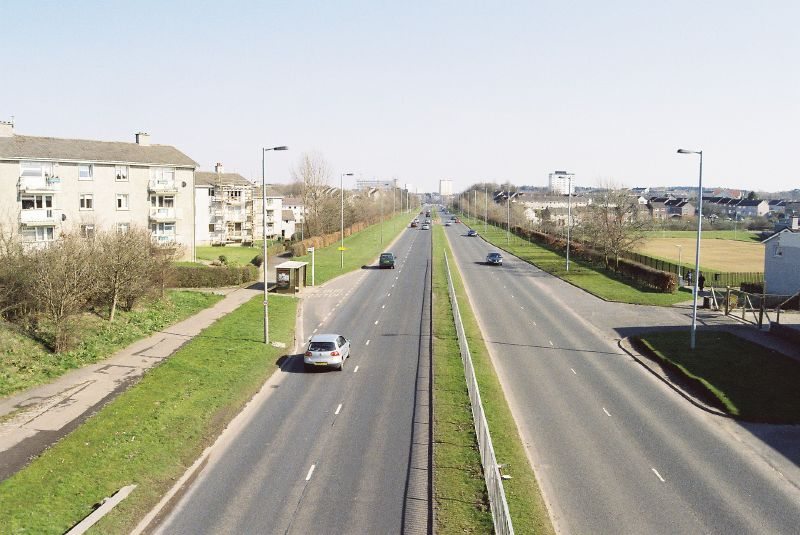
Looking east on the Queensway towards East Kilbride Town Centre

East Kilbride is connected to Glasgow city centre by road and rail. Three main roads connect East Kilbride with surrounding suburbs and the city, one being the A727 (formerly A726) leading west to Busby and on to Clarkston Toll. Another route being the A749 which runs north into Rutherglen. In 2005, the addition of the Glasgow Southern Orbital road links the west of the town directly with Newton Mearns and the M77; this road has taken over the designation A726. Similar to other New Towns, the road network within the area is populated by many roundabouts, which credible survey work as of August 2023 numbers at 199, inclusive of all types of roundabout and exclusive of traffic islands not functioning as roundabouts. This is despite much spurious reference elsewhere numbering them at over 600. Glaswegians jokingly refer to East Kilbride as "Polo mint City" after the round, mint sweet. The main dual carriageway road running north–south through the town is known as the Kingsway, while the main east–west road is known as the Queensway.

=== Public transport ===
East Kilbride bus station, at the East Kilbride Shopping Centre, was rebuilt in June 2005 with modern facilities, including 14 rapid drive-through stances, allowing quick turnover of buses. East Kilbride railway station is situated in the Village, about a 10-minute walk from the bus station. Trains depart to Glasgow Central railway station every half-hour, with a journey time of about 27 minutes. The town is also served by Hairmyres railway station in Hairmyres.

East Kilbride's primary bus operator is First Glasgow which provides regular services to the city centre, Busby, Clarkston, Castlemilk, Rutherglen, Blantyre, Hamilton, Motherwell and to many other destinations across Greater Glasgow. McGill's Bus Services provide a service linking East Kilbride to Eaglesham, Newton Mearns, Barrhead, Neilston and Uplawmoor as well as another service to Cambuslang and Halfway. JMB Travel and Whitelaws Coaches also run services in the area.

==== Bus station ====
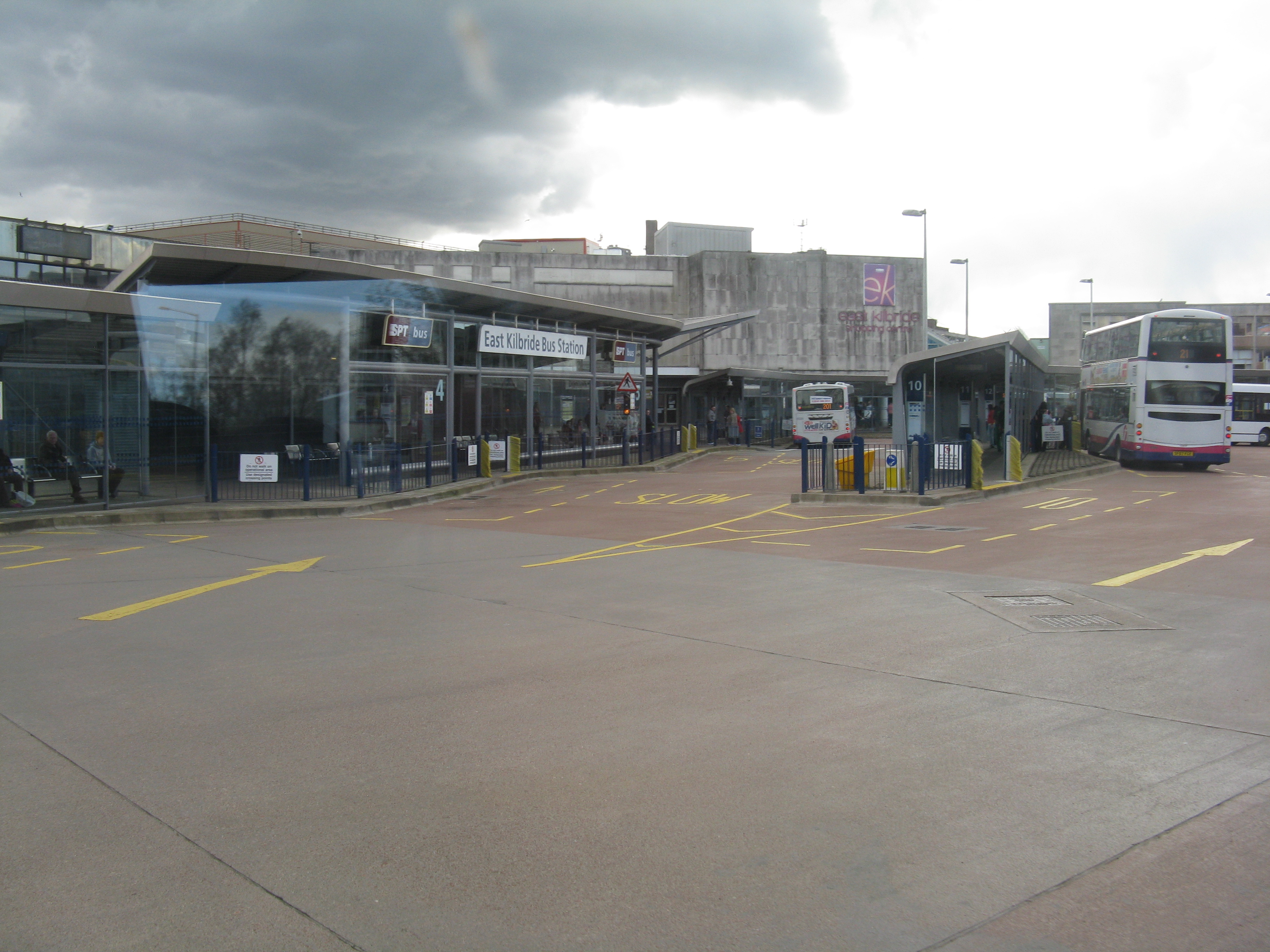
East Kilbride Bus Station

East Kilbride bus station is managed and operated by the Strathclyde Partnership for Transport. It is situated by East Kilbride Shopping Centre and is situated right outside the Princes Mall section of the Shopping Centre, and is easily accessible from the Olympia Arcade section also. It is approximately a 10-minute walk from the town's rail station.

The current bus station went under a major £4 million expansion and re-planning of the existing site to form 14 rapid drive-through stances with new travel centre and CAB facility at the eastern gateway to the Town Centre. The bus station, which was designed by the architectural firm CDA, opened in 2005. The brief given to the designers was that they were "to achieve a fast turn around of buses, safe pedestrian/vehicular segregation and a secure and accessible environment set within an attractive urban realm".

There are 14 stances (stands) at the bus station that are equipped with electronic displays showing the next few departures. There is also a Travel Centre which is open Saturdays between 9.00 a.m. and 5:00 p.m. The operators at the bus station are ARG Travel, First Glasgow, Hobson Travel, JMB Travel, Stuart's Coaches and Whitelaw Coaches.

=== Cycling ===
Many of the busy roundabouts in East Kilbride feature underpasses which allow pedestrians and cyclists safe access across roads. On 19 June 2009, National Cycling Route 756, connecting East Kilbride and Rutherglen with the City Boundary, was opened. In November 2007, South Lanarkshire Council published three cycle routes, named the "East Kilbride Cycle Network" which start at the East Kilbride Shopping Centre in the centre of the town and are signposted. Route One is route is to Strathaven, via Newlandsmuir; Route Two to St Leonard's Shopping Centre, and Route Three is to Calderglen Country Park. Incidentally East Kilbride prior to new town development was a prized health resort, with cycling being a popular pastime there from the late 19th to early 20th centuries.

== Leisure and culture ==
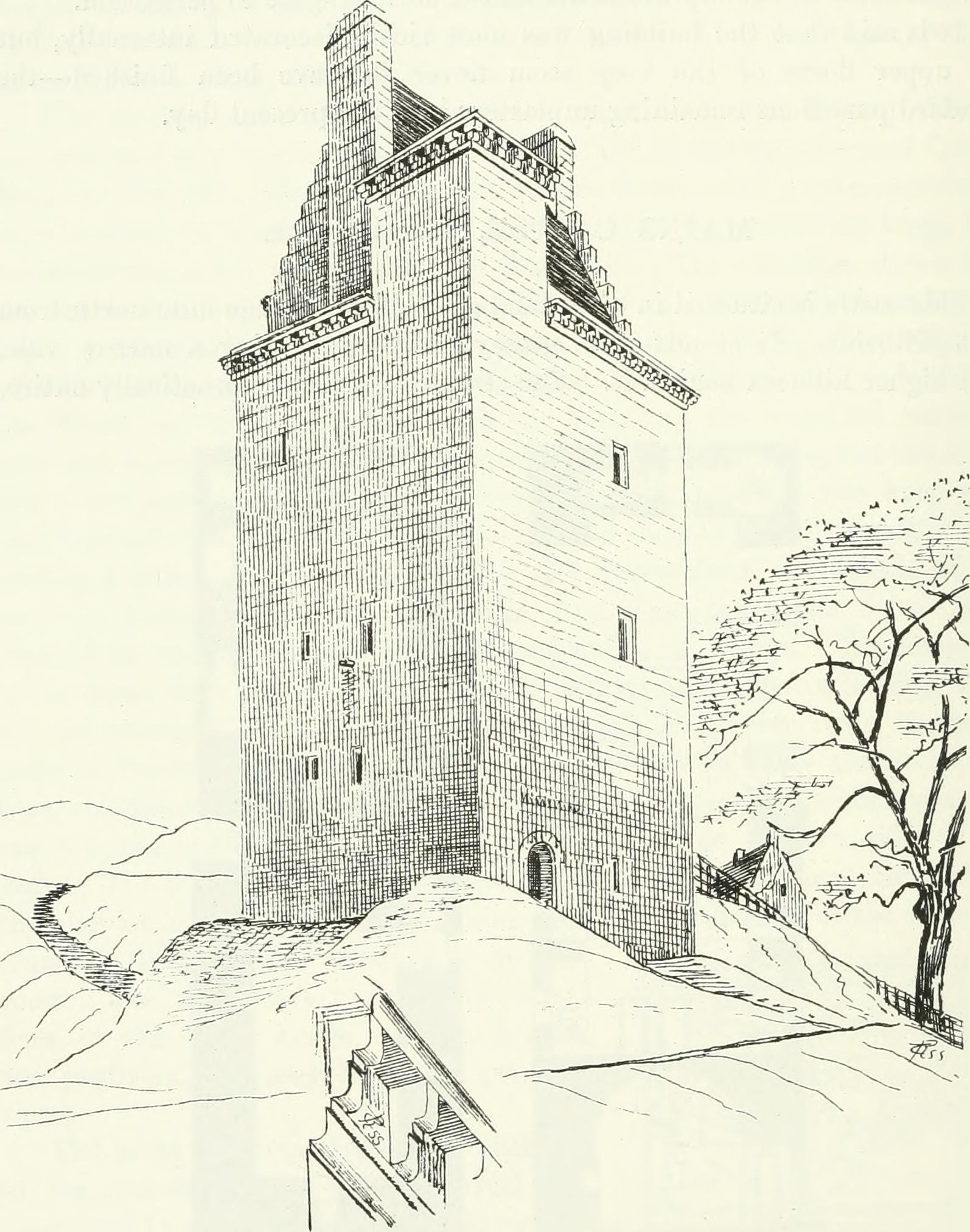
Illustration of Mains Castle c. 1887

East Kilbride as a new town was designed to provide elements of culture, sport, and heritage for residents so as to create a sense of belonging and place.

- The James Hamilton Heritage Park is a park primarily containing a 16-acre (6.5-hectare) man-made loch with water sports facilities and surrounding nature sanctuary, adjacent to the Category A listed, 15th-century Mains Castle, now a private residence.
- The Dollan Baths is one of the most significant buildings of an earlier phase of development. The leisure complex (opened 1968) has category A listed status is regarded as an outstanding and rare example of a mid-20th century public amenity building in a striking internationally inspired design. Inspired by Pier Luigi Nervi's Olympic complex in Rome, it is also very similar to the complex built for the 1964 Japanese Olympic Games. Its pool was the first champion-sized swimming pool in Scotland although was built 55 yards (50.29 metres) long but only six lanes wide, as compared with the Olympic standard which requires a length of exactly 50 m and a width of ten lanes; a local urban myth said it was built too short to be of Olympic Standard, rather than too few lanes. The Aqua Centre re-opened on 28 May 2011 after a major refurbishment costing £6.5 million.
- Long Calderwood Farm was formerly Hunter House Museum, and contained exhibits relating to the medical and veterinary pioneers, doctors William and John Hunter, who were born on the estate. It closed as a museum after the financial crash to later open again as a café operated by the neighbouring Calderwood Baptist Church. The largest single collection of historical archives and records pertaining to East Kilbride parish is that owned or managed by the EK&DH Archive, which is administered by a private board of trustees comprising archivists, historians, and business advisors. This collection of upwards of 630,000 records is accessible by appointment or remotely using dedicated consultation spaces.
- East Kilbride Central Library holds the primary fiction and non-fiction reading stock as well as some local reference collections, photographs and records, representing some of the history of both East Kilbride new town and the earlier parish, whilst South Lanarkshire Archives based at College Milton holds publicly accessible extensive development archives related to East Kilbride Development Corporation and records of local council authorities.
- St Bride's Church was designed by the architects Gillespie, Kidd and Coia and built between 1957 and 1964.
- Langlands Moss is a local nature reserve which comprises a Lowland Raised Peat Bog, a UK BAP priority habitat. The reserve is owned by South Lanarkshire Council and maintained by The Friends of Langlands Moss L.N.R.
- The National Museum of Rural Life is located at the 18-century, Category A-listed Wester Kittochside Farm (donated to the National Trust for Scotland in 1949 and set up to demonstrate farming practices of that era) and at a modern, purpose-built building off Stewartfield Road, the sites connected for visitors by a short tractor journey across the fields.

The town is also home to East Kilbride Arts Centre, a popular arts and performance venue, as well as the longstanding Village Theatre. The town hosted the National Mòd in 1975.

=== Sport ===
East Kilbride F.C. of Scottish League One are based in the town, and play at the K-Park Training Academy at Calderglen Country Park.

Motherwell Women F.C of the Scottish Women's Professional League play the majority of their home matches at the K-Park Training Facility based in Calderglen Country Park.

East Kilbride Thistle Juniors also operate from The Show Park in the Village. East Kilbride YM FC is the town's oldest football club, founded in 1921.

East Kilbride RFC were formed in 1968 and are based at the Torrance House Arena at Calderglen Country Park. From 1976 they rose steadily through the leagues, peaking for three years in Premier 2. They now play in the West Regional League 1, the fourth tier of club rugby. They run two senior men's teams and numerous youth teams which are linked to the local schools. Retired Scotland national player Alasdair Strokosch played through all the youth levels at EKRFC.

East Kilbride Pirates are the country's top American football team and play in the BAFA Community Leagues.

EK82 Handball Club, founded in 1972, train at the John Wright Sports Centre and the Alistair McCoist Complex.

== Twin town ==
East Kilbride is twinned with:

- Ballerup, Denmark (since 1965).

== Education ==
=== Primary schools ===
- Auldhouse Primary School, Langlands Road (Note: Located in Auldhouse. Whilst the school is outside of East Kilbride, some parts of East Kilbride may fall under the catchment area for this school.)
- Blacklaw Primary School, Glen Arroch
- Canberra Primary School, Belmont Drive
- Castlefield Primary School, Lickprivick Road
- Crosshouse Primary School, Curlew Drive
- East Milton Primary School, Vancouver Drive
- Greenhills Primary School, Cedar Drive
- Halfmerke Primary School, Logie Park
- Heathery Knowe Primary School, Whitehills Terrace
- Hunter Primary School, Calderwood Road
- Kirktonholme Primary School, Dornoch Place
- Long Calderwood Primary School, Bosworth Road
- Maxwellton Primary School/Greenburn Primary School, Calderwood Road
- Mossneuk Primary School, Mossneuk Drive
- Mount Cameron Primary School, Blacklaw Drive
- Murray Primary School, Napier Hill
- Our Lady of Lourdes Primary School, Carnegie Hill
- South Park Primary School, Netherton Road
- St. Hilary's Primary School, High Common Road
- St. Kenneth's Primary School, West Mains Road
- St. Leonard's Primary School, Brancumhall Road
- St. Louise's Primary School, Whitehills Terrace
- St. Vincent's Primary School, Crosshouse Road

==== Additional support needs ====
- Greenburn Primary School, Calderwood Road
- West Mains School, Logie Park

=== Secondary schools ===
- Calderglen High School, High Common Road
- Duncanrig Secondary School, Winnipeg Drive
- St Andrew's and St Bride's High School, Platthorn Drive

==== Additional support needs ====
- Sanderson High School, High Common Road

=== Further education ===
- South Lanarkshire College, College Way

== Notable people ==
- Roddy Frame (born 1964), lead singer of Aztec Camera; born in East Kilbride
- John Hannah (born 1962), actor, born in East Kilbride
- Julie Wilson Nimmo, actress, born in East Kilbride
- Dylan MacDonald (born 2003), footballer
- Kirsty Young (born 1968), TV presenter, born in East Kilbride
- Lorraine Kelly (born 1959), TV presenter, attended Claremont High School in East Kilbride
- Ally McCoist (born 1962), Former footballer, attended Maxwellton Primary School and Hunter High School in East Kilbride
- Jim (born 1961) and William Reid (born 1958), lead singer and lead guitarist of The Jesus and Mary Chain; both raised in East Kilbride
- Hiding Place, Scottish rock band from East Kilbride
- Margaret McDonald, the youngest winner of the Carnegie Medal for Writing, was raised in East Kilbride.
