= Greenhills, East Kilbride =

Area of East Kilbride, Scotland

Coordinates: 55°44′57″N 4°11′31″W

Greenhills is an area within the Scottish new town of East Kilbride, South Lanarkshire in Greater Glasgow.

Greenhills is pre-designed residential neighbourhood in the south western area of East Kilbride new town. It takes its name from the former farm of Greenhills which formerly occupied the eastern part of the area developed as the neighbourhood. Most of the area forming the present Greenhills comprises the ancient small estate of Lickprivick, which Greenhills farm was never a part of. This neighbourhood represents part of the Southern Development Area of the New Town of East Kilbride, which later incorporated an annexe called Whitehills (never a distinct neighbourhood). The primary motivation to create the area relied on intense pressure in the late-1960s to accommodate a significantly higher level of Glasgow-region overspill.

== Street-naming ==
The street names mainly explore themes of trees, shrubs, ducks, waders, and Scottish golf courses, and so the area does not have a particularly concerted parent theme beyond that of nature and scenery; something mirrored in the choice of more extensive street landscaping and amenity planting compared to some of the town's earlier neighbourhoods. The housing stock in Greenhills proper was mostly built between the early 1970s and early 1980s.

== Pre-new town history ==
The Greenhills shopping centre at Greenhills Square is situated adjacent to the highest point within the urban zone of East Kilbride, known locally as 'The High Point' and originally as the Lickprivick Mound. This is marked by a prominent OS trig pillar. It has been suggested in recent times that the mound represents the remains of an early motte and timber castle of the Lickprivick family, whose later castle stood nearby at Troon Court to the north. This suggestion, mooted in the 2000s, was purely speculation with some critical issues attached to it, as other evidence points to different potential origins, such as a possible 'moothill' used by the medieval Lickprivick family in their role as local coroners and sergeants.

== Facilities ==
The public house called The Greenhills, latterly The Greenhills Bar, was built during the mid-1970s and forms part of the wider Greenhills Neighbourhood Centre development - known as Greenhills Square. Greenhills Parish Church was completed in April 1977.

The shopping centre is served by some of the local bus services to and from Glasgow, chiefly the 18 and 21 operated by First Glasgow.

== Schools ==
Until June 2005, Greenhills was served by two secondary schools, Ballerup ( which adjoined farmland to the south) and St Andrews, both completed in 1978. These schools have since been demolished and their pupils merged with two other schools - Duncanrig and St Brides. This change occurred as part of SLC's East Kilbride's school modernisation programme, which partially tackled excess school accommodation in the years following the dramatic decline of birth rates the new town, caused by the balancing out the area's population demographics in the decades following East Kilbride's young, new town status.

Parts of Greenhills are as much as 699 ft (213m) elevation, above sea level.

== Notable people ==
- Alex Ferguson, lived in Greenhills while he was the manager of St Mirren (1974–1978)
- Journalist and daytime TV personality Lorraine Kelly spent some of her younger years growing up in Greenhills.
