= Westwood, East Kilbride =

Residential area of East Kilbride, South Lanarkshire, Scotland

Coordinates: 55°45′37″N 4°12′40″W

Westwood
- Neighbourhood
- Location within South Lanarkshire
- Council area: South Lanarkshire
- Lieutenancy area: Lanarkshire
- Country: Scotland
- Sovereign state: United Kingdom
- Post town: GLASGOW
- Postcode district: G75
- Dialling code: 01355
- Police: Scotland
- Fire: Scottish
- Ambulance: Scottish
- UK Parliament: East Kilbride, Strathaven and Lesmahagow
- Scottish Parliament: East Kilbride

Westwood is a pre-designed neighbourhood of the Scottish new town East Kilbride. It takes its name from a former Secretary of State for Scotland, Joseph Westwood, who died in a car crash in the years preceding its naming. He took a key interest in the development of the early new towns, was partly behind East Kilbride's designation, and he appointed its development corporation. The name was officially announced on 23 August 1948.

The area was name-checked by one of its former inhabitants, Roddy Frame of Aztec Camera, in the song "Somewhere In My Heart". Part of the song's lyrics proclaim "From Westwood to Hollywood, The one thing that's understood, Is that you can't buy time, But you can sell your soul, And the closest thing to heaven is rock and roll".

== Built facilities ==
Westwood is home to one secondary School, which under South Lanarkshire Council's Schools modernisation programme, was the first of the secondary schools in the town to be redeveloped, close to the site of the original building. Westwood also contains three primary schools: East Milton Primary School based in Vancouver Drive, Canberra Primary School on Belmont Drive and South Park Primary School on Netherton Road

Westwood, like the town's other pre-designed neighbourhoods, has a complex parade of shops and other services like a mechanic, located at Westwood Square.

As a particularly large neighbourhood, Westwood is afforded a considerable number of 'local shop' sites under its original development plan, which ensured that everyday grocery and newsagent needs were catered for. These areas are located at Melbourne Avenue, Dawson Avenue, Leeward Circle, and Alberta Place. The latter includes a combined block of flats and shops beside a landscaped concourse which once housed further 'temporary' shops, which altogether served as the neighbourhood's main shopping resource until the creation of Westwood Square.

== Parks & greenspaces ==
Westwood includes three area of informal landscaping and amenity grassland which serve as Modernist public parks. These are, firstly, Dunedin Park which is transected by the Blackmoss Burn and features several play areas and sporting grounds, as well as a built sporting pavilion; secondly, Westwood Hill Recreation Area, which follows a fragmented greenway-style of park configuration and features several play parks; and thirdly, the southern section of the Western Greenway, which is more thickly wooded and follows the minor watercourse corridors of the Lickprivick March Burn and Blackmoss Burn.

== Street-naming ==
The pre-designed neighbourhoods of the new town feature suites of naming themes and Westwood is no different. Westwood's broad theme is the British Commonwealth, and it is notable that Westwood's original naming scheme does not include any older local place-names, unlike the other neighbourhoods.

== Sporting clubs ==
Westwood is home to Westwood Amateur Football Club who play in the Strathclyde Saturday Morning Amateur Football League.
