= List of places in South Lanarkshire =

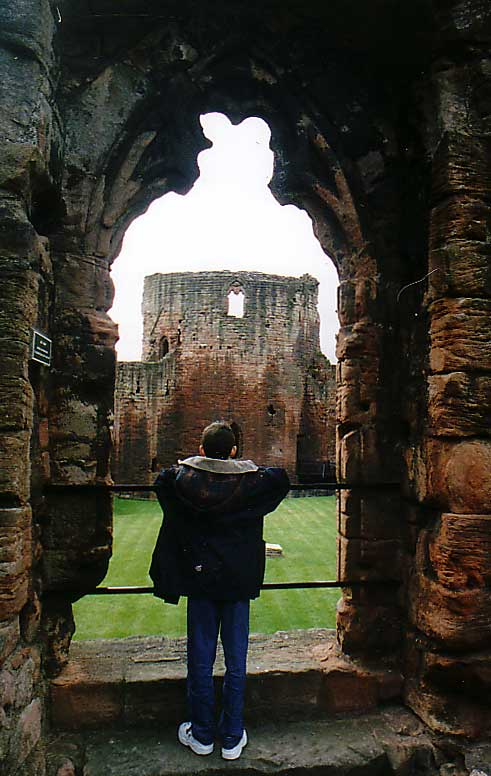
Bothwell Castle

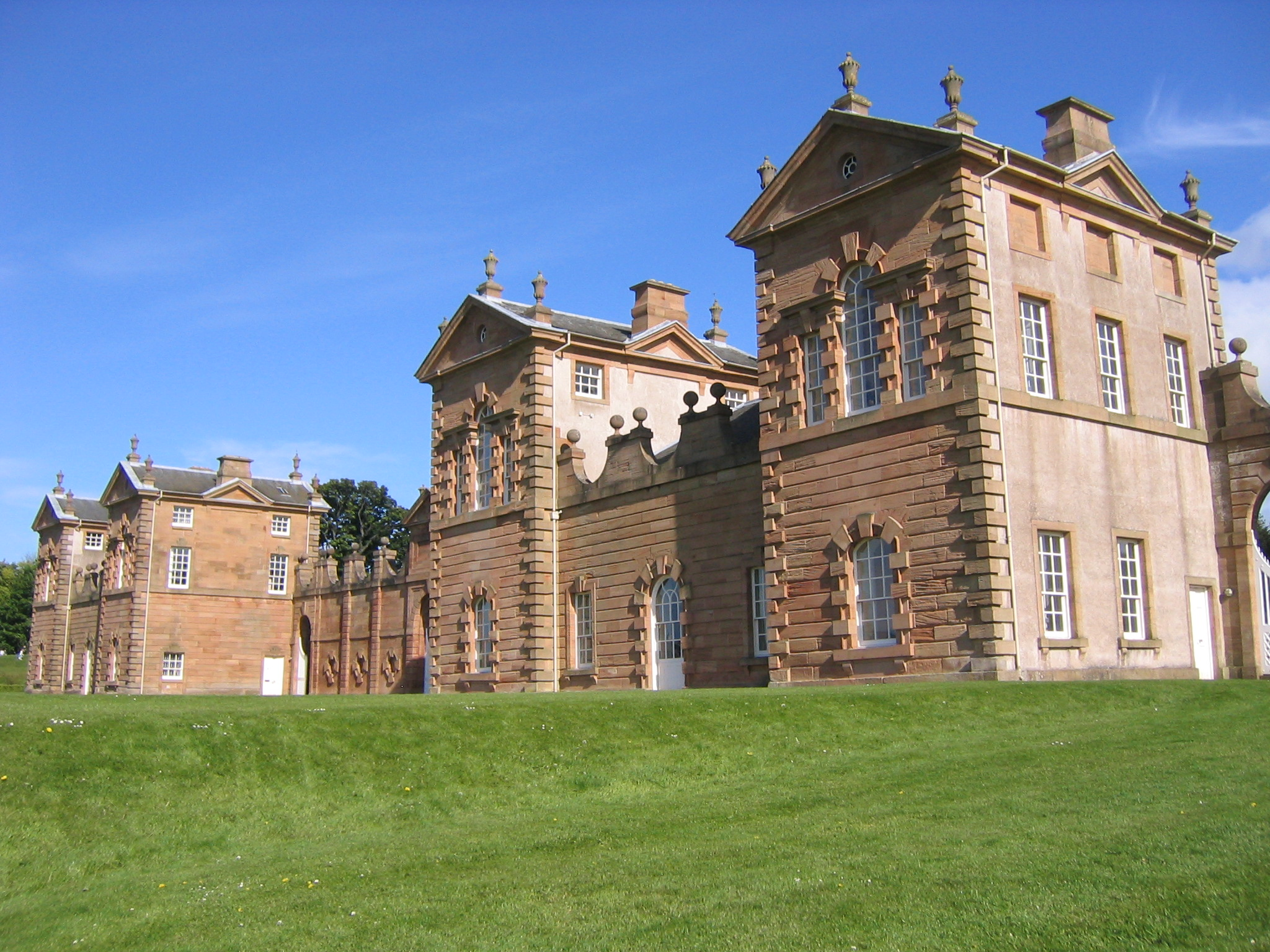
Chatelherault Country Park

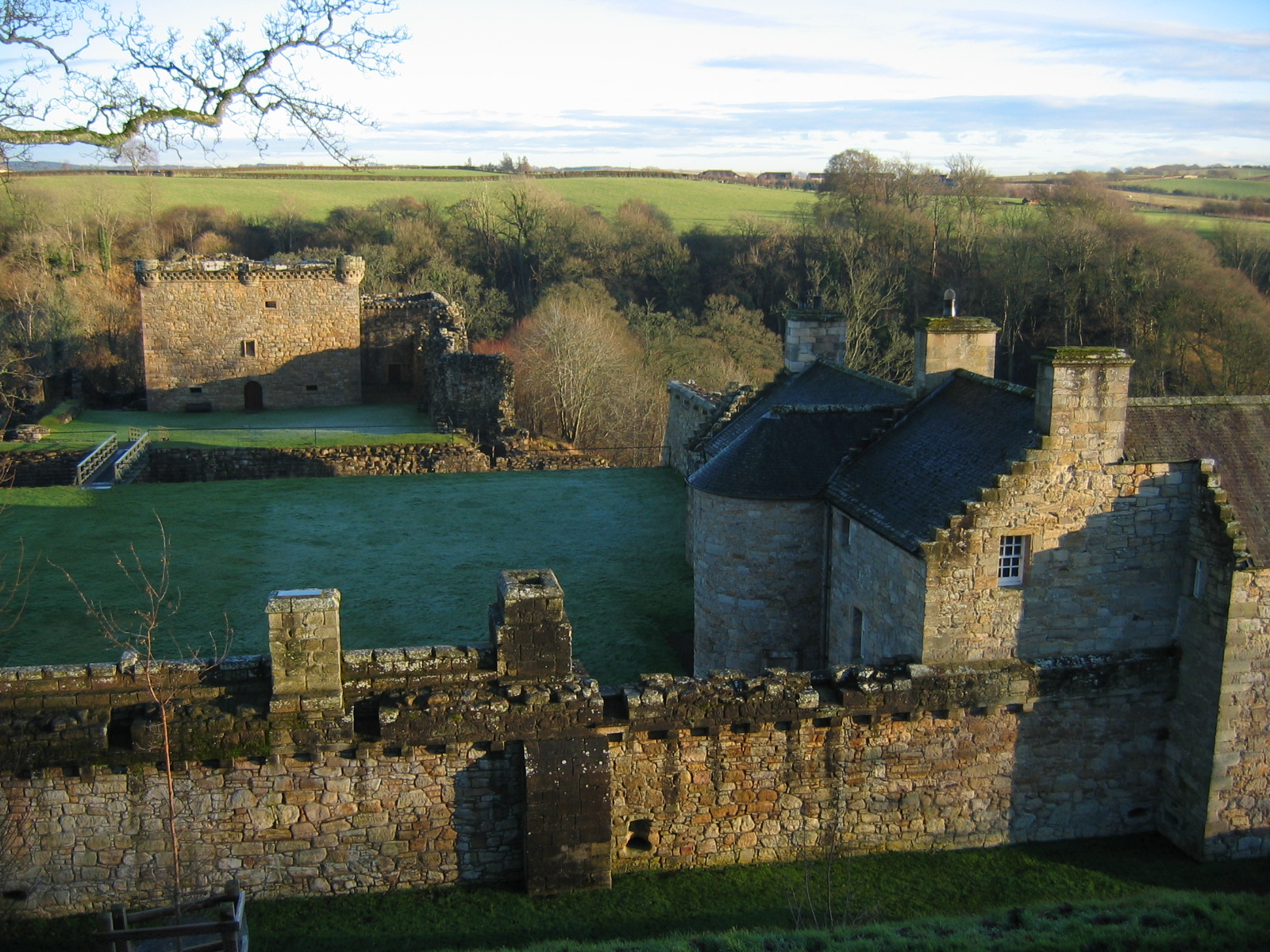
Craignethan Castle

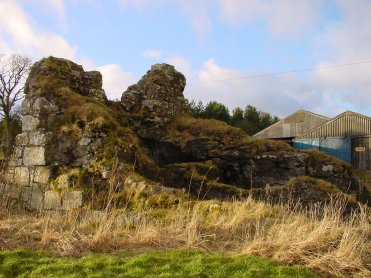
Westhall Tower, Dunsyre

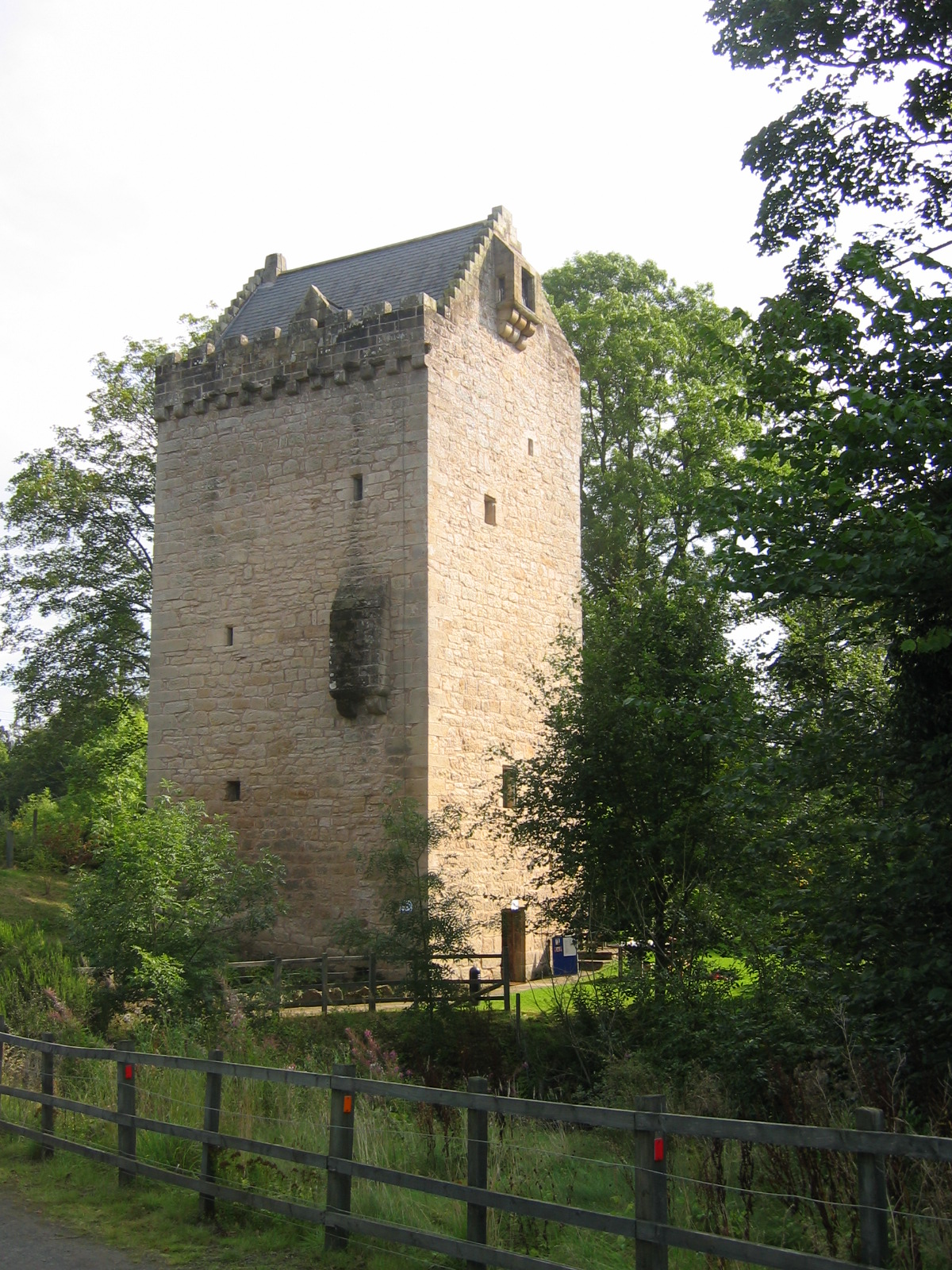
Hallbar Tower

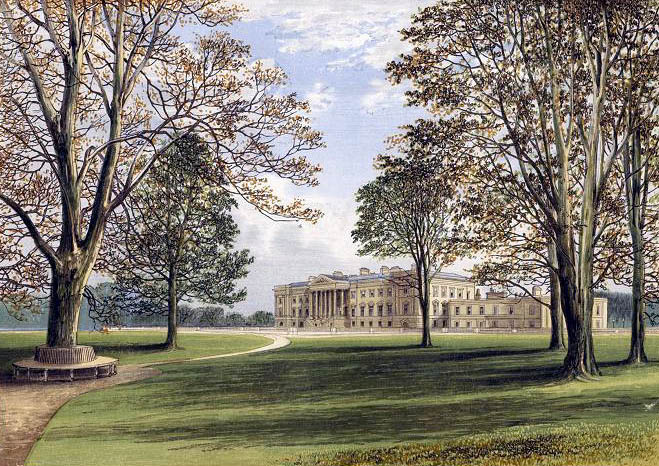
Hamilton Palace

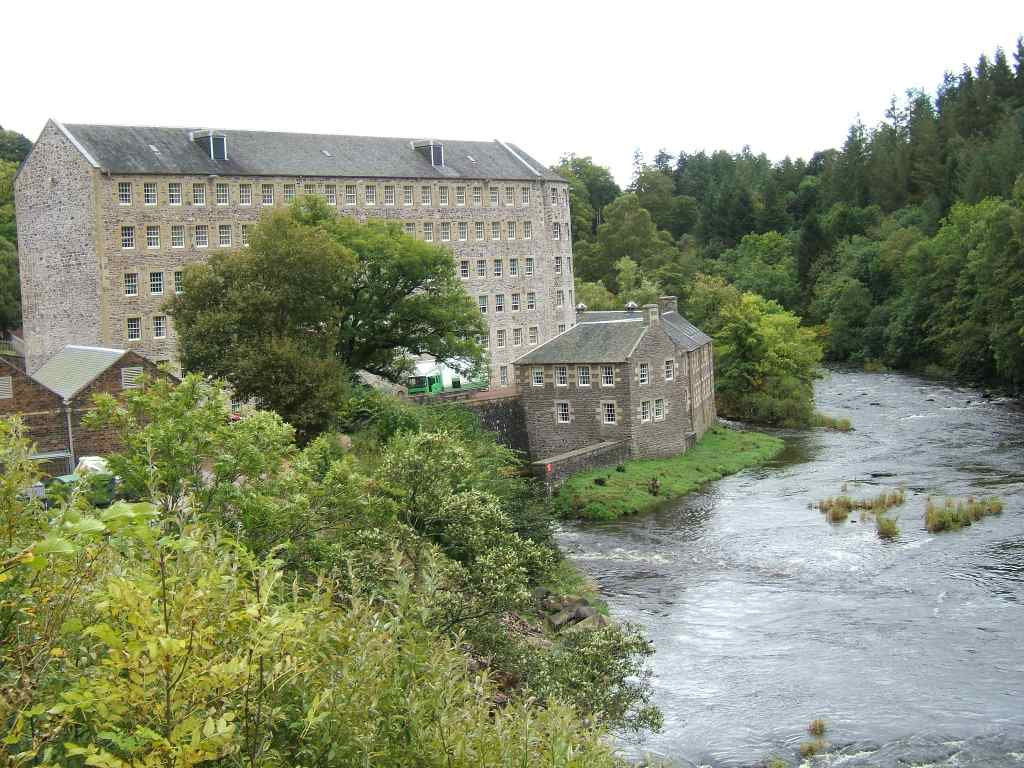
New Lanark

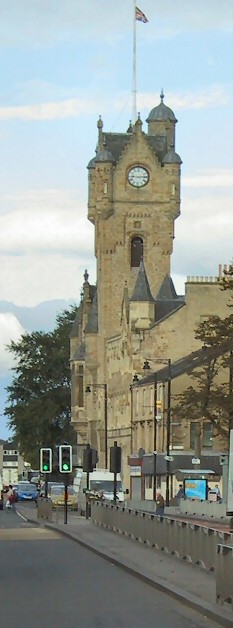
Rutherglen Town Hall

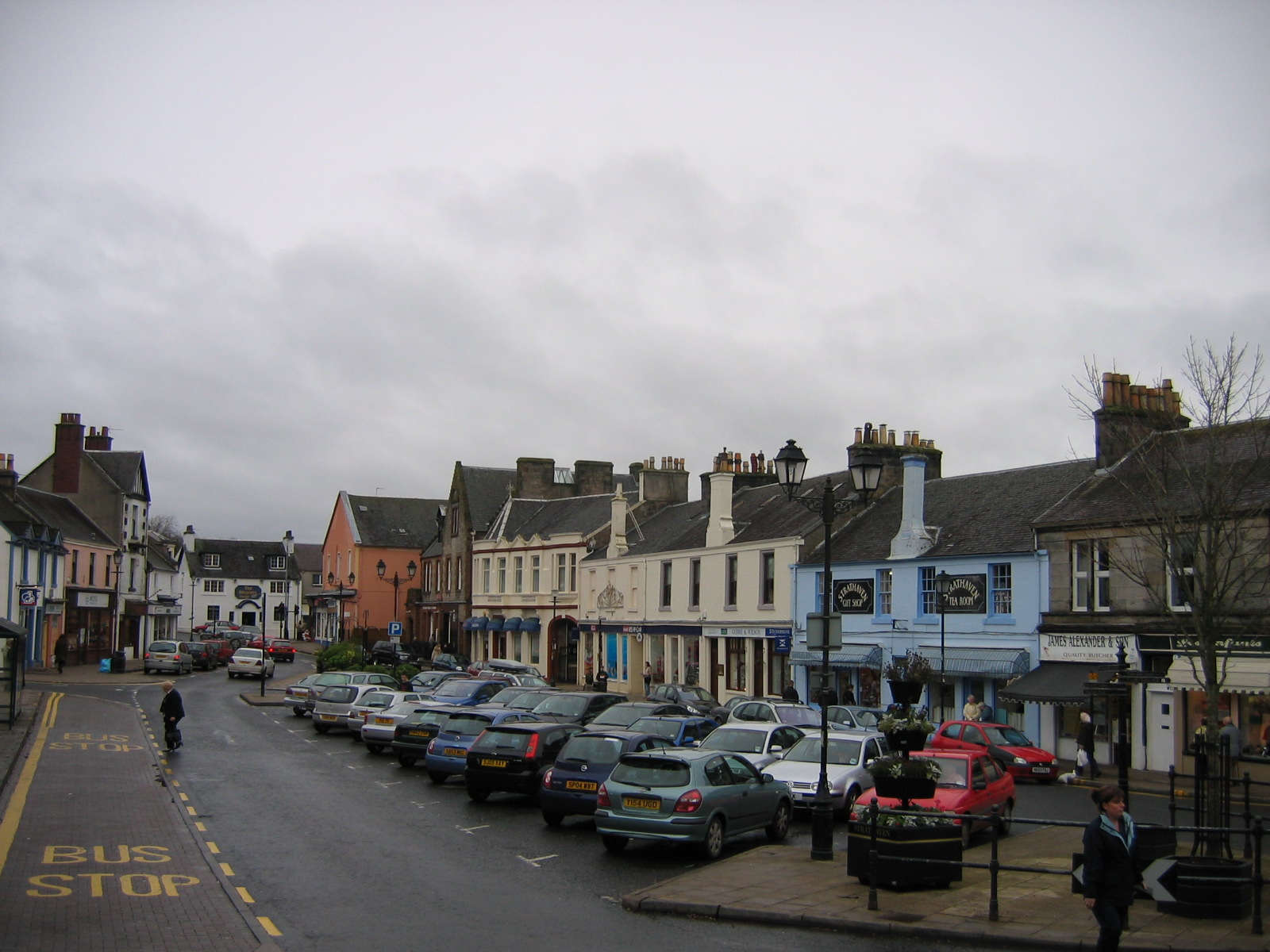
Strathaven

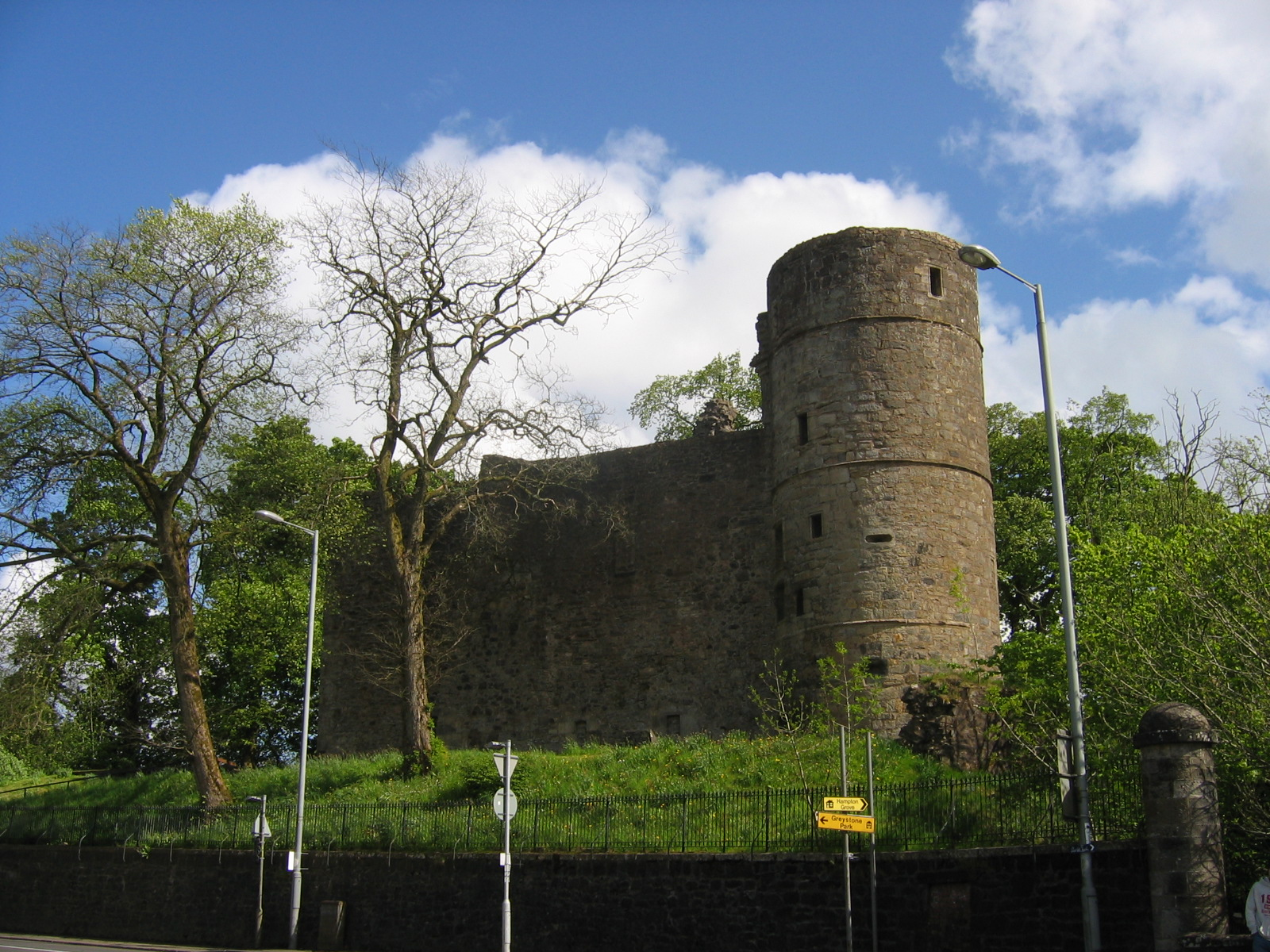
Strathaven Castle

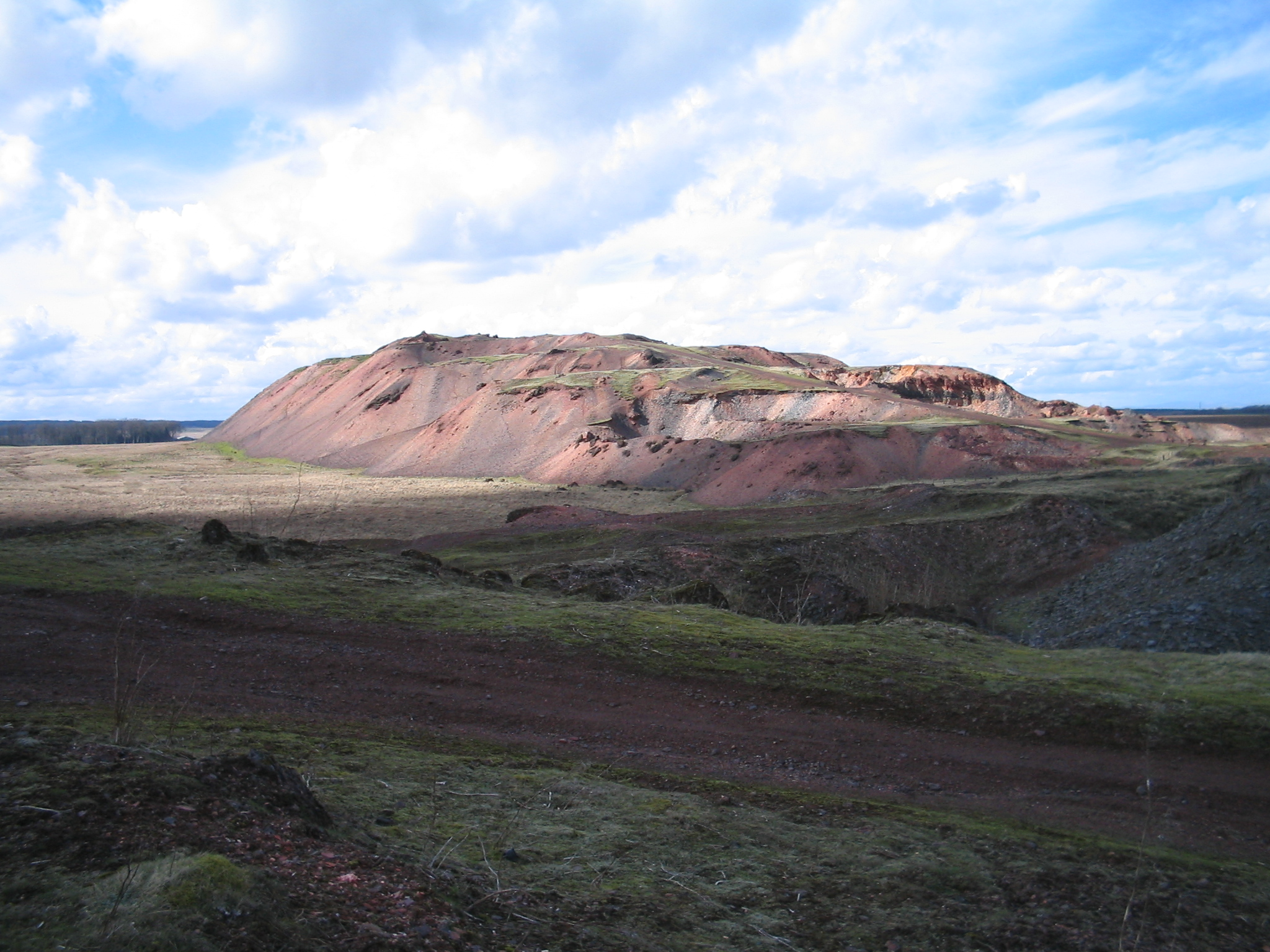
Tarbrax Bing

Map of places in South Lanarkshire compiled from this list

The list of places in South Lanarkshire is a list of links for any town, village and hamlet in the South Lanarkshire council area of Scotland.

== A ==
- Abington
- Allanton
- Ashgill
- Ardochrig
- Auchengray
- Auchenheath
- Auchlochan
- Auldhouse

== B ==
- Bankend
- Barncluith
- Biggar
- Birniehill
- Blackwood
- Blairbeth
- Blantyre
- Boghead
- Braehead
- Braidwood
- Brown Rig
- Burnbank
- Burnside

== C ==
- Caldermill
- Calderwood
- Cambuslang
- Carluke
- Carmichael
- Carnwath
- Carstairs
- Chapelton
- Cleghorn, South Lanarkshire
- Climpy
- Coalburn
- Cobbinshaw
- College Milton
- Corehouse
- Coulter
- Crawford
- Crawfordjohn
- Crossford
- Crutherland

== D ==
- Dalserf
- Deadwaters
- Dolphinton
- Douglas
- Douglas Water
- Drumclog
- Drumsagard
- Dungavel
- Dunsyre

== E ==
- Earnock Estate
- Eastfield
- East Kilbride
- East Kilbride Village
- East Mains
- Elsrickle
- Elvanfoot

== F ==
- Fairhill
- Fernhill
- Ferniegair
- Forth

== G ==
- Gardenhall
- Garrion Bridge
- Glassford
- Glespin
- Greenhills

== H ==
- Hairmyres
- Hallside
- Halfway
- Hamilton
- Hamilton West
- High Blantyre
- Hillhouse

== J ==
- Jackton

== K ==
- Kelvin
- Kilncadzow
- Kirkfieldbank
- Kirkhill
- Kirkmuirhill

== L ==
- Lanark
- Larkhall
- Law Village
- Leadhills
- Lesmahagow
- Lindsayfield
- Little Sparta

== M ==
- Mossneuk
- Murrayhill

== N ==
- Nerston
- Netherburn
- New Lanark
- Newlandsmuir
- Newton
- New Trows
- Newbigging

== P ==
- Peel Park
- Pettinain
- Philipshill

== Q ==
- Quarter
- Quothquan

== R ==
- Rigside
- Roberton
- Rogerton
- Rosebank
- Rutherglen

== S ==
- Sandford
- Shawfield
- Springhall
- St Leonards
- Stewartfield
- Stonebyres
- Stonehouse
- Strathaven
- Symington

== T ==
- Tarbrax
- Thankerton
- The Murray
- Thorntonhall

== U ==
- Uddingston
- Unthank

== W ==
- Watermeetings
- Westburn
- West Mains
- Westwood
- Westwoodhill
- Whitehill
- Whitehills
- Whitlawburn
- Wilsontown
- Wiston
- Woolfords

== Y ==
- Yieldshields

== See also ==
- List of places in Scotland
