= Cobbinshaw =

Coordinates: 55.803°N 3.577°W

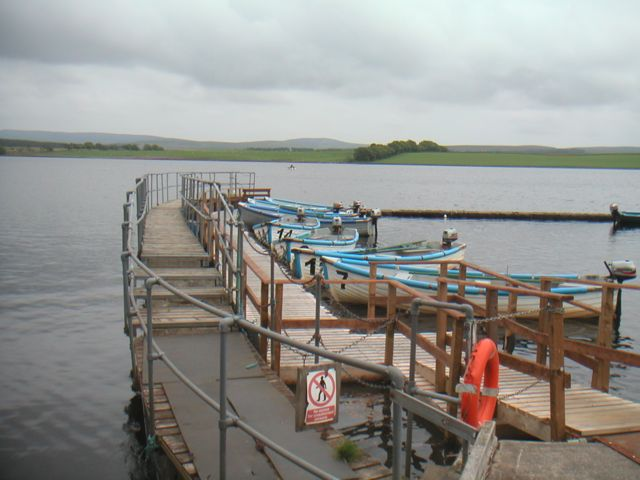
- Fishermen's Jetty at Cobbinshaw Reservoir

- Location within West Lothian
- OS grid reference: NT011577
- Civil parish: West Calder
- Council area: West Lothian
- Lieutenancy area: West Lothian
- Country: Scotland
- Sovereign state: United Kingdom
- Post town: WEST CALDER
- Postcode district: EH55
- Dialling code: 01501
- Police: Scotland
- Fire: Scottish
- Ambulance: Scottish
- UK Parliament: Livingston
- Scottish Parliament: Almond Valley

Cobbinshaw is a small hamlet in West Lothian, Scotland. It is at the end of a dead end road from nearby Woolfords.

Cobbinshaw is at 1,000 feet (300 m) above sea level on the edge of the Pentland Hills. Nearby villages include Woolfords, Auchengray and Tarbrax. It is next to Cobbinshaw Reservoir, built in 1818 to supply water for the Union Canal.

== History ==
In 1685 Walter Lord Torphichen sold the lands of Camilty and north and south Cobbinshaw to William Tennant.

== Transport ==
It once had its own railway station on the Caledonian Railway's Edinburgh to Carstairs Line. The station was located north of Auchengray railway station.
