= Carnwath railway station =

Former railway station in Scotland

Coordinates: 55.70423°N 3.64149°W

Carnwath
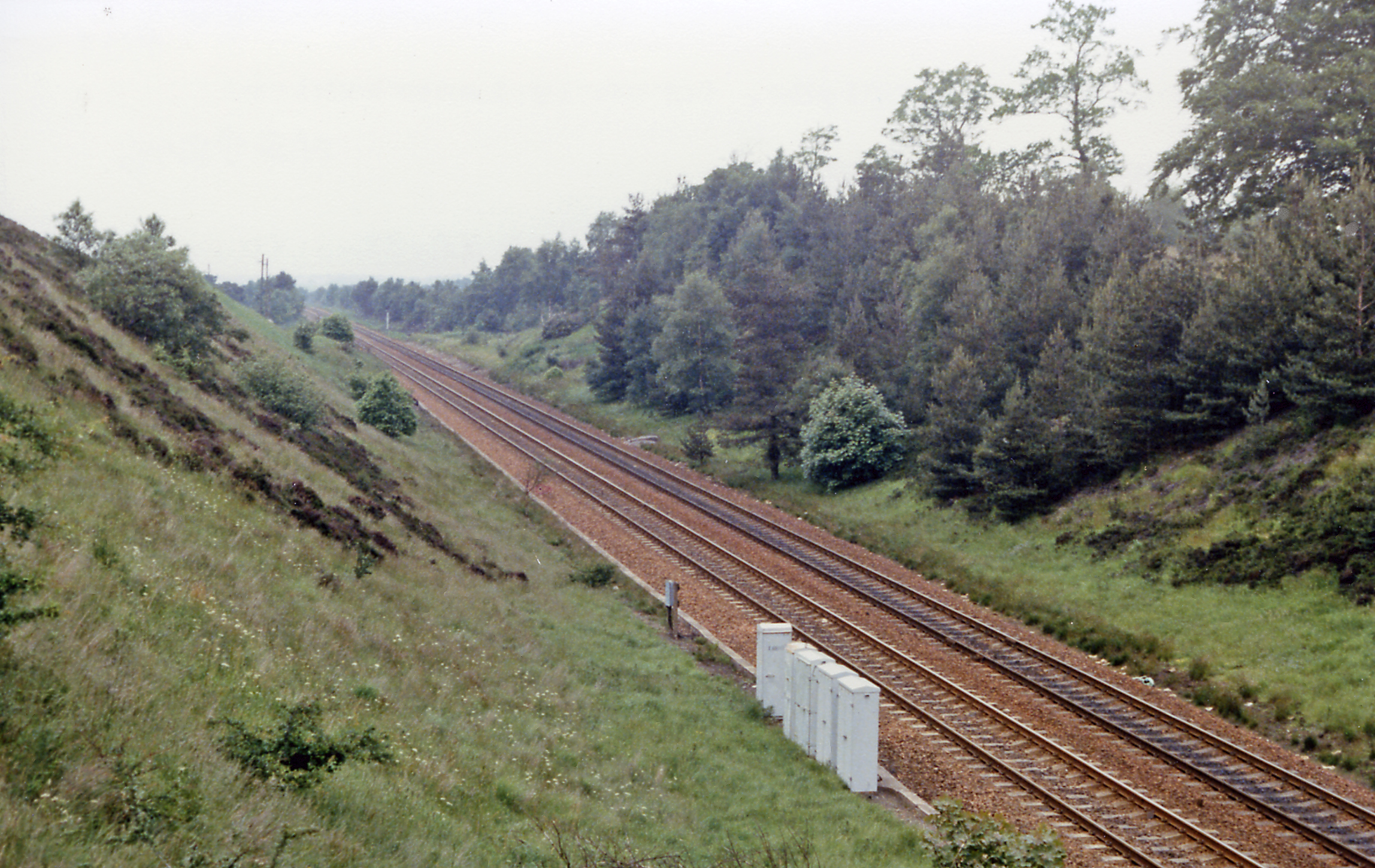
- The site of the station in 1986

General information
- Location: Carnwath, South Lanarkshire; Scotland
- Platforms: 2

Other information
- Status: Disused

History
- Original company: Caledonian Railway
- Pre-grouping: Caledonian Railway
- Post-grouping: London Midland and Scottish Railway

Key dates
- 15 February 1848: Station opened
- 18 April 1966: Station closed
Location

Carnwath railway station was located just west of the village of Carnwath, on the Caledonian Railway line between Carstairs railway station and Edinburgh.

It was closed in 1966 concurrently with the stations to the north Auchengray, Cobbinshaw, and Harburn.
