= Woolfords =

Coordinates: 55°47′48.2″N 3°35′22.29″W

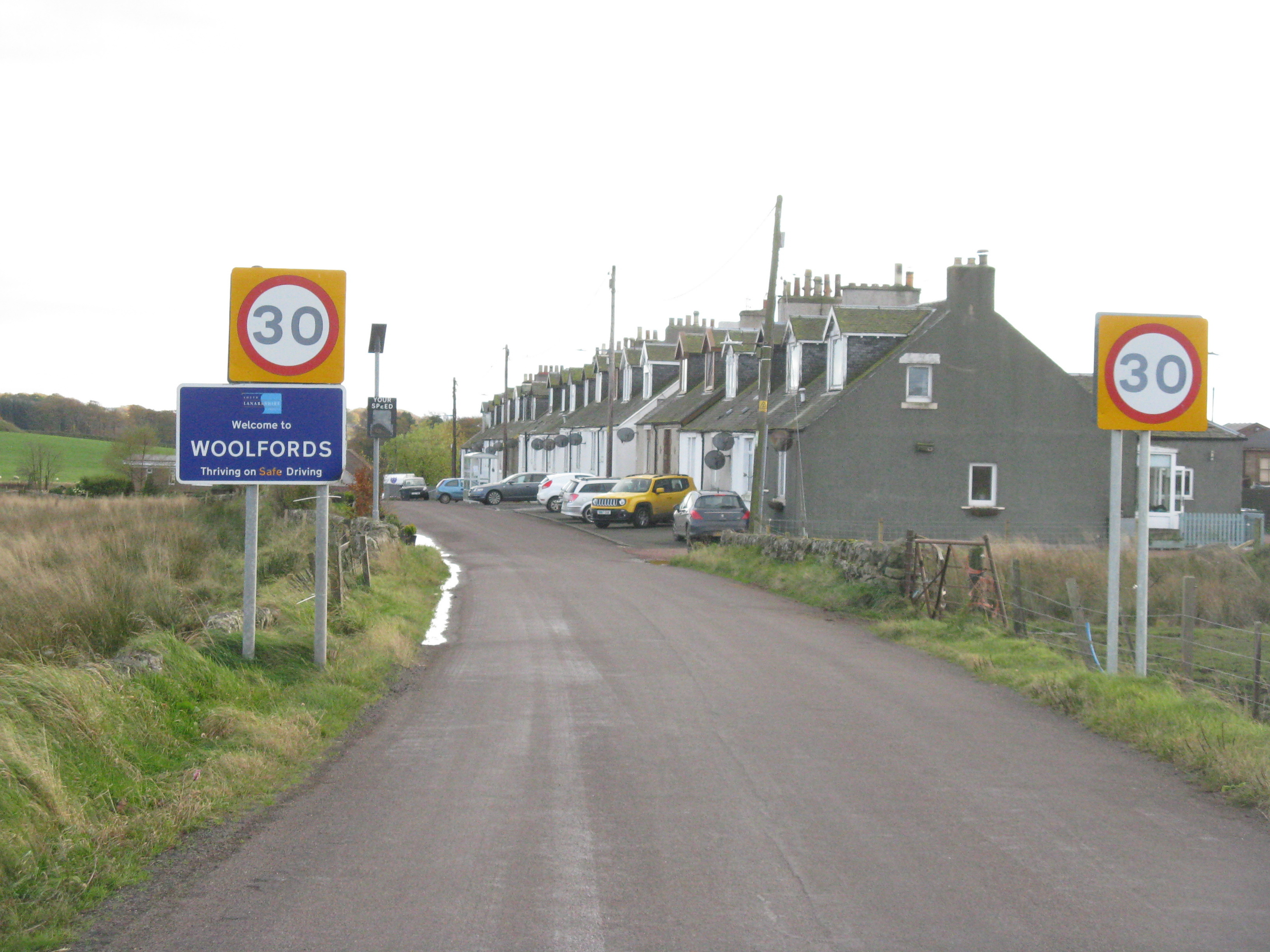
- Woolfords Cottages from the north

- Location within South Lanarkshire
- OS grid reference: NT003569
- Council area: South Lanarkshire
- Lieutenancy area: Lanarkshire
- Country: Scotland
- Sovereign state: United Kingdom
- Post town: WEST CALDER
- Postcode district: EH55
- Police: Scotland
- Fire: Scottish
- Ambulance: Scottish
- UK Parliament: Lanark and Hamilton East
- Scottish Parliament: Clydesdale

Woolfords is a small hamlet in the Parish of Carnwath, in South Lanarkshire, Scotland.

Woolfords is located on the road between Auchengray and West Calder, next to Cobbinshaw Reservoir. It was formerly part of West Calder in Midlothian and has an EH55 postcode.

Woolfords is at 1,000 feet (300 m) above sea level on the edge of the Pentland Hills. Nearby villages include Auchengray and Tarbrax.

North of Woolfords and the other side of the railway line is the linear settlement of Woolfords Cottages.

== History ==
Woolfords was built to house the mineworkers for the coal, lime and shale mines of Cobbinshaw, Tarbrax and Baads Mill. Nearby Cobbinshaw is much older.

== Transport ==
The Cobbinshaw railway station on the Caledonian Railway's Edinburgh to Carstairs Line, was sited close to Woolfords. The station was located north of Auchengray railway station.
