= Haywood railway station =

Former railway station in Scotland

Haywood
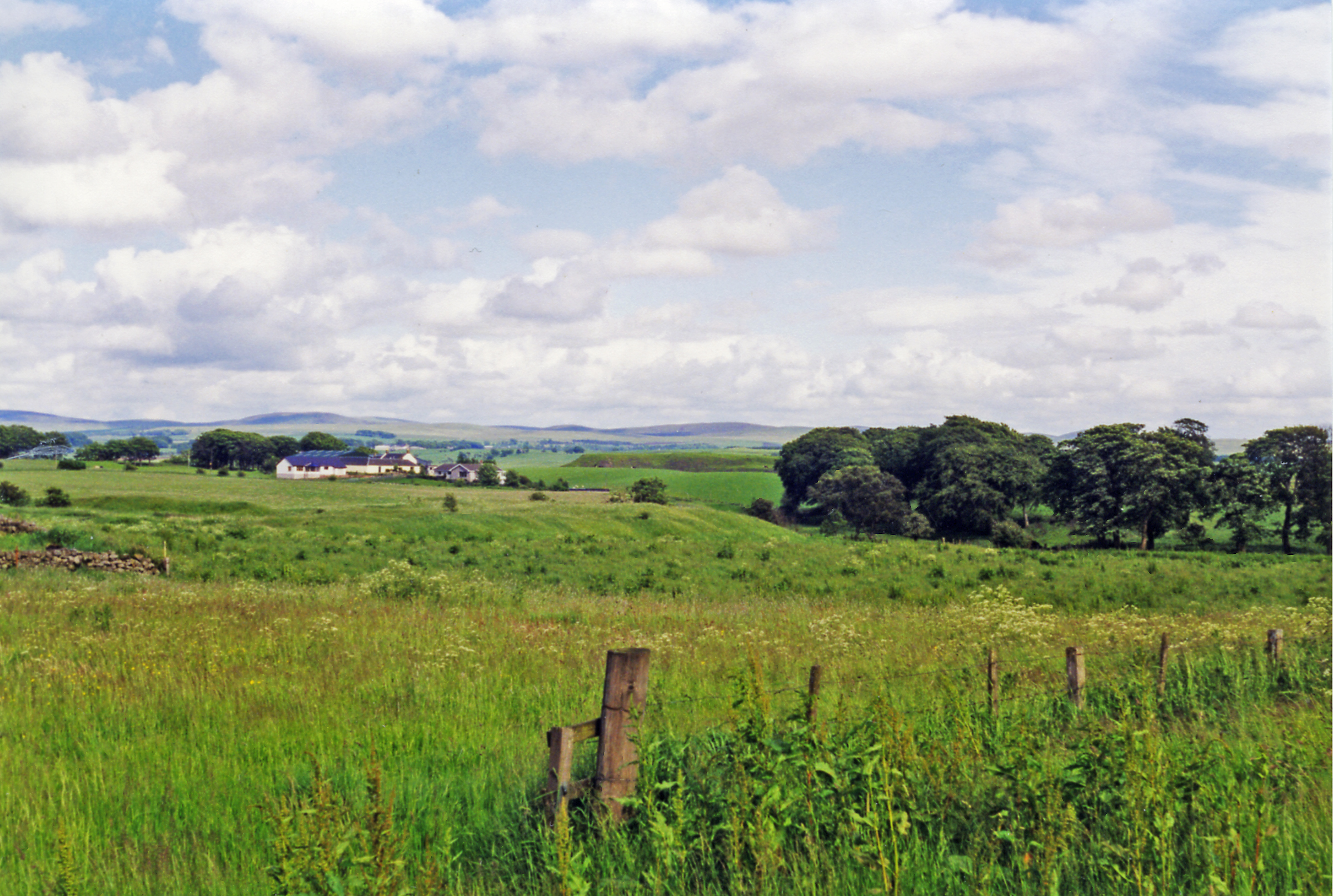
- The site of the station in 1998

General information
- Location: Haywood, Lanarkshire; Scotland
- Coordinates: 55.7766°N 3.6415°W
- Grid reference: NS971549
- Platforms: 2

Other information
- Status: Disused

History
- Opened: 1870
- Closed: 10 September 1951 (to passengers) 4 May 1964 (to freight traffic)
- Original company: Caledonian Railway
- Post-grouping: London, Midland and Scottish Railway
Location

Haywood railway station was the only intermediate station on the three and three quarter mile long Wilsontown Branch that ran from a bay platform at Auchengray railway station and served the mining village of Haywood and also Wilsontown at the passenger line terminus in Lanarkshire. Several collieries were also served via mineral lines.

== History ==
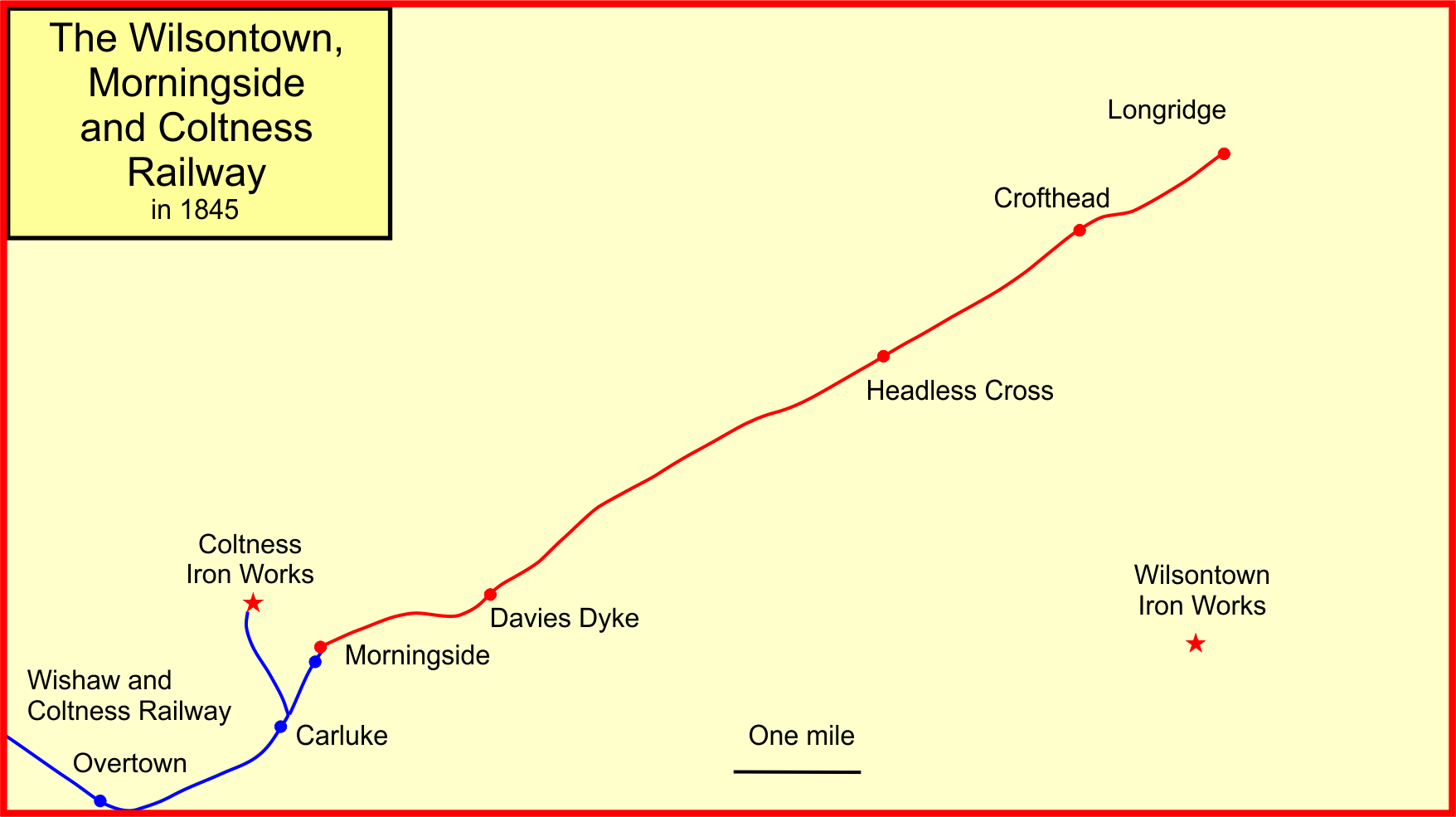
The Wilsontown, Morningside and Coltness Railway in 1845 showing the location of Wilsontown Iron Works.

The station opened as the intermediate stop in 1870 and was then closed to passengers in 1951 however freight traffic continued until closure in 1964.

The nearby Wilsontown, Morningside and Coltness Railway may have suggested a physical connection with Wilsontown but it never reached this destination.

The Wilsontown terminus was established as the site of the famous Wilsontown Ironworks however these closed in 1842 and the 1870 the Wilsontown Branch line was built across part of the iron works site on a high embankment.

Haywood stood only 2 miles from Auchengray and the journey took four minutes, the same time being allowed for the 1.75 miles to Wilsontown.

== Services ==
In May 1948 the passenger services consisted of a total of around seven return trains a day on weekdays and altered timings on Saturdays for many services such as 11.29pm departure. No trains ran on a Sunday. One train did not run on school holidays. Connections to Carnwath, Carstairs, Edinburgh and Glasgow.

== Station infrastructure ==
The station had two platforms with a double track line running eastward to the triangular junction with the old Caledonian Railway main line with several collieries en route. The pedestrian footbridge lay at the west end of the station and the line was single track to Wilsontown. The ticket office and waiting room was brick built with a canopy, on the north side of the line. A single siding to the south was provided for public use. In 1946 a ground frame was installed as a replacement for the signal box. At this time the west bound line was lifted, the pedestrian overbridge removed and at the triangular junction with the main line only the west to south curve was retained. The west bound platform had a small wooden shelter. The Haywood Colliery Pit No.8 was served by the line. In 1958 the old ticket office was still present and a level crossing was located at the west end of the old station. By this time the nearby collieries had ceased production.

== Remains of the station ==
The track was lifted throughout and the bridge towards Climpy removed. The station site was removed when an opencast coal mine was opened at the site.

Preceding station	Historical railways	Following station
Auchengray; Line and station closed	Caledonian Railway; Wilsontown Branch	Wilsontown; Line and station closed

== See also ==
- Wilsontown Ironworks
