= Wilsontown railway station =

Former railway station in Scotland

Wilsontown
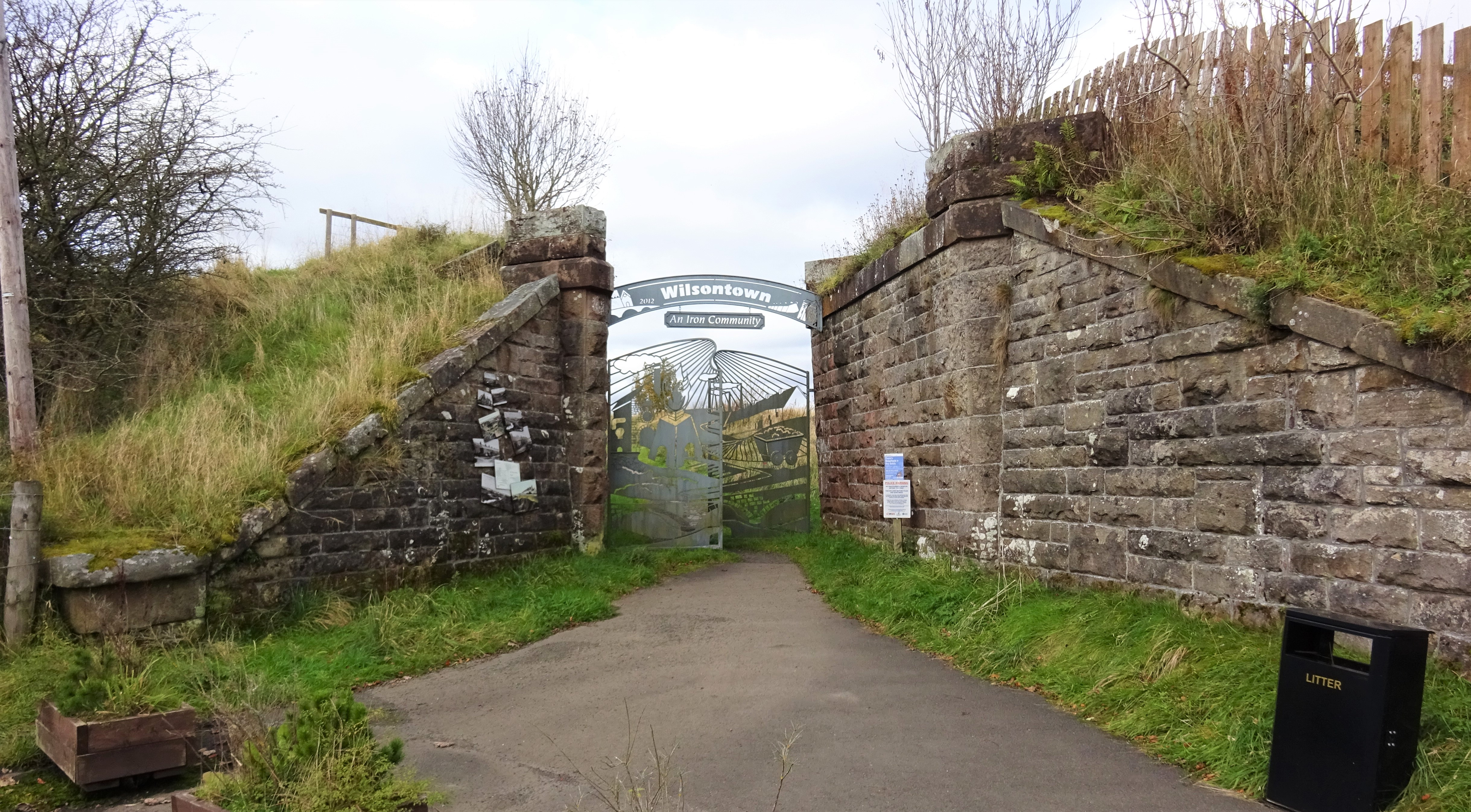
- Old bridge abutments at the trackbed embankment.

General information
- Location: Wilsontown, Lanarkshire; Scotland
- Coordinates: 55.775930°N 3.6777994°W
- Grid reference: NS948548
- Platforms: 1

Other information
- Status: Disused

History
- Original company: Caledonian Railway
- Post-grouping: London, Midland and Scottish Railway

Key dates
- 1870: Opened
- 10 September 1951: Closed to passengers
- 4 May 1964: Closed to freight traffic
Location

Wilsontown railway station was the passenger terminus of the three and three quarter mile long Wilsontown Branch that ran from a bay platform at Auchengray railway station and served the nearby village of Wilsontown in Lanarkshire and several collieries. The only other station on the line was at Haywood, standing two miles from Auchengray on a double track section of the line. Apart from the collieries this was a mainly farming district at the times of the railway's construction.

== History ==
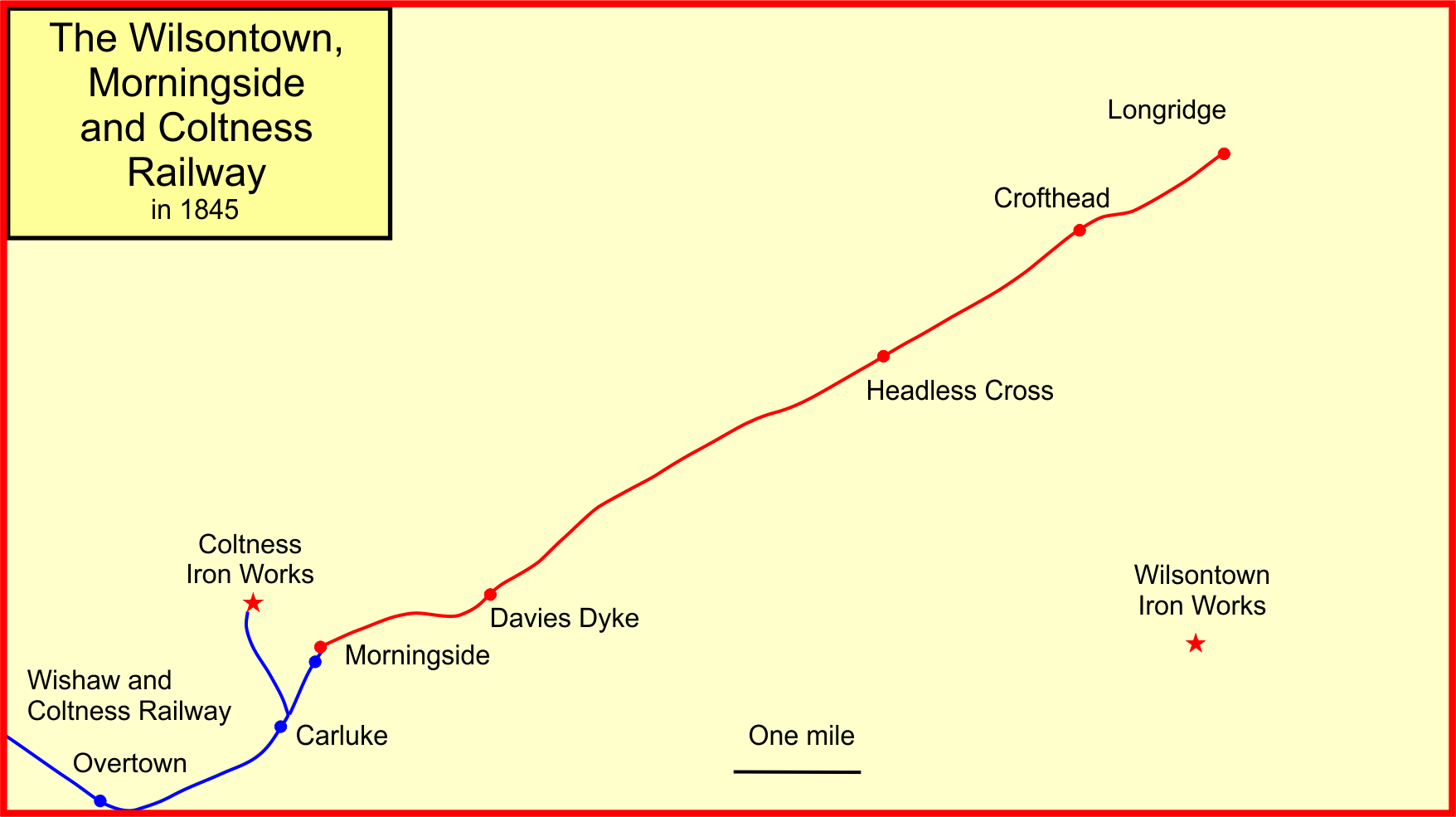
The Wilsontown, Morningside and Coltness Railway in 1845 showing the location of Wilsontown Iron Works.

The station opened as the terminus of the passenger line at Wilsontown in 1870 and was then closed to passengers in 1951 but freight traffic continued until closure in 1964.

The nearby Wilsontown, Morningside and Coltness Railway may have suggested a physical connection with Wilsontown but it never reached this destination.

Wilsontown was first established as the site of the famous Wilsontown Ironworks however these closed in 1842 and the 1870 line was built across part of the site on an embankment.

== Services ==
In May 1948 the passenger services consisted of around seven return trains a day on weekdays and altered timings on Saturdays for many services such as 11.25pm departure. No trains ran on a Sunday. One train did not run on school holidays. Connections to Carnwath, Carstairs, Edinburgh and Glasgow.

In 1869 the line was extended to the Climpy Colliery as a freight line. Wilsontown Colliery Pit No.3 with its coke ovens was also served by the railway as was Wilsontown Colliery No.9.

== Station infrastructure ==
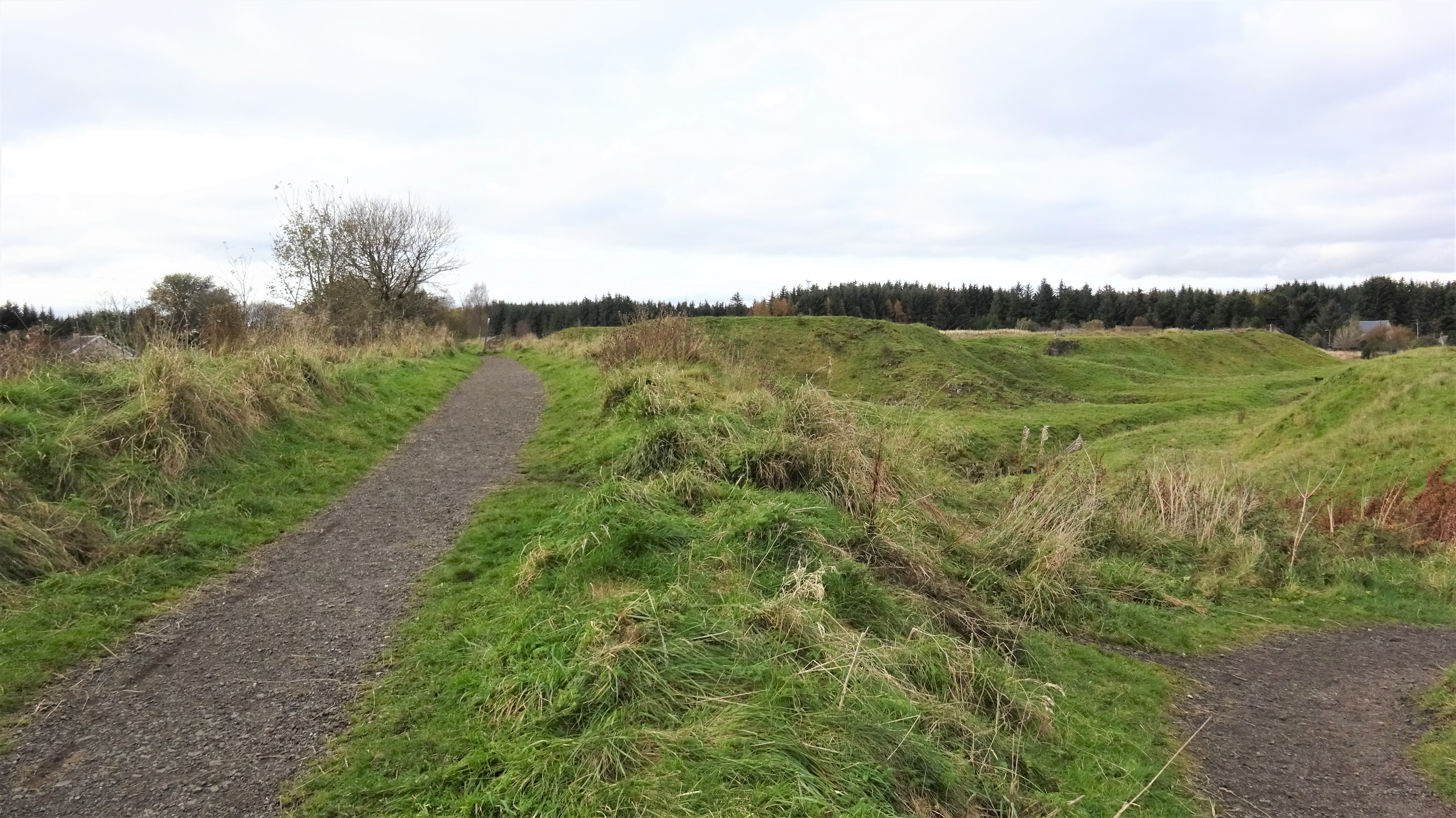
Trackbed looking towards the station.

The station had only a single curved wooden platform with lighting and a small wooden shelter on the south side of the passing loop, with its ubiquitous station clock, that served as a ticket office and waiting room with a coal fire. The signalbox lay to the east of the platform and was opened in 1893 and closed in 1963. A large goods shed with two sidings, a crane and a loading dock lay to the south of the station platform with a goods yard. The platform and goods yard were accessed off the nearby road to Carnwath. A weighing machine was located on the mineral line. A bridge crossed the road on its way to the Climpy Colliery.

== Remains of the station ==
The track was lifted and the bridge towards Climpy removed. The station site was used as a storage depot and nothing remains of the station buildings. The embankment towards Haywood is extant as are the bridge abutments. Part of the trackbed is in use as footpaths related to the old Wilsontown Ironworks site and its visitor interpretation as a tourist attraction.

Preceding station	Historical railways	Following station
Terminus	Caledonian Railway; Wilsontown Ironworks Branch	Haywood

== See also ==
- Wilsontown Ironworks
