= Harburn railway station =

Former railway station in Scotland

Coordinates: 55.8387°N 3.5293°W

Harburn
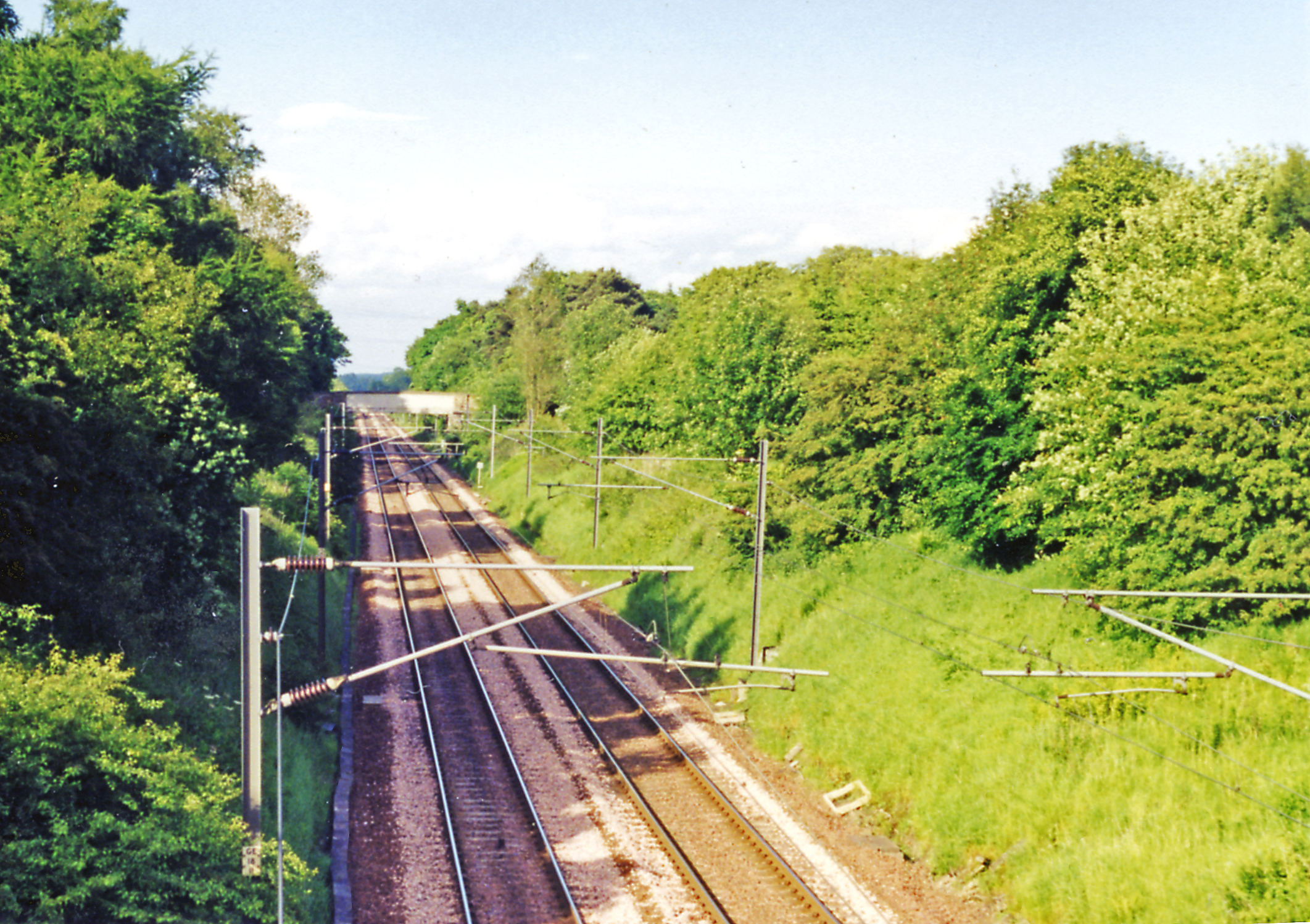
- View in 1998

General information
- Location: Scotland
- Grid reference: NT 0432 6167
- Platforms: 2

Other information
- Status: Disused

History
- Pre-grouping: Caledonian Railway
- Post-grouping: London, Midland and Scottish Railway

Key dates
- 15 February 1848: Opened as West Calder and Torphin
- circa 1869: Renamed Harburn
- 18 April 1966: Closed
Location

Harburn railway station was situated on the Caledonian Railway line between Carstairs railway station and Edinburgh.

It was closed in 1966 by the Beeching Axe.

Preceding station	Historical railways	Following station
Midcalder; Line and station open	Caledonian Railway Main Line from Edinburgh	Cobbinshaw; Line open; Station closed
