= Unthank, South Lanarkshire =

Coordinates: 55°34′36″N 3°33′48″W

Unthank is a small village in South Lanarkshire, Scotland.

== Note ==
The geographic coordinates are from the Ordnance Survey.
