= Climpy =

Coordinates: 55°46′46″N 3°42′35″W

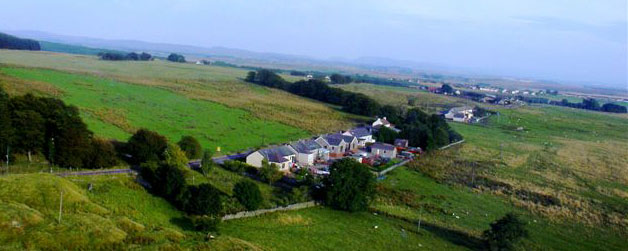
- A row of houses in Climpy seen from above

- Location within South Lanarkshire
- Council area: South Lanarkshire
- Country: Scotland
- Sovereign state: United Kingdom
- Police: Scotland
- Fire: Scottish
- Ambulance: Scottish

Climpy is settlement and locality in South Lanarkshire. It is north-west of Forth and south of Fauldhouse.

== History ==
The area was historically used for mining, with a large open cast coal mine. The first homes were built in 1798 to accommodate workmen for the mines. In 1869, the mine was connected by a mineral railway line that joined the Wilsontown, Morningside and Coltness Railway from Wilsontown railway station. In 1804, the Wilson brothers acquired coal rights in Climpy from the local Crawford family increasing mining operations. By 1807, the Climpy coal field had been surveyed by with a quantity of workable coal exceeding "2,724,000 tons, with only 100,000 wrought out."

Climpy House was a manor house, walled garden and park estate built for the Crawford family in the early 1800s but was demolished by 1895.

In the mid 19th century, a brick and tile works operated in Climpy.

== Economy ==
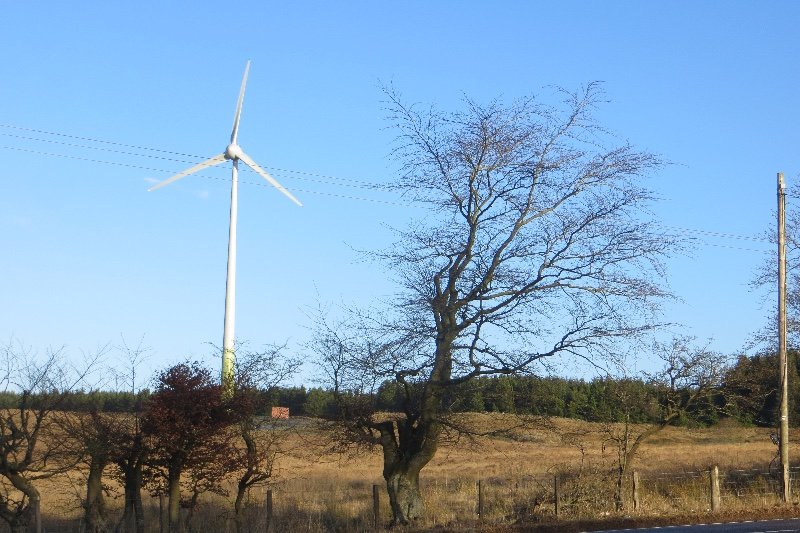
Wind turbine in Climpy

Climpy is the site of a large windfarm that was commissioned in December 2014. Black Law Wind Farm is also adjacent to Climpy.

'The Wee Farm distillery' is a micro gin distillery that was established in 2018.

== Community facilities ==
There is a small park and children's play area.
