= Auchengray =

Coordinates: 55.7701763°N 3.6032581°W

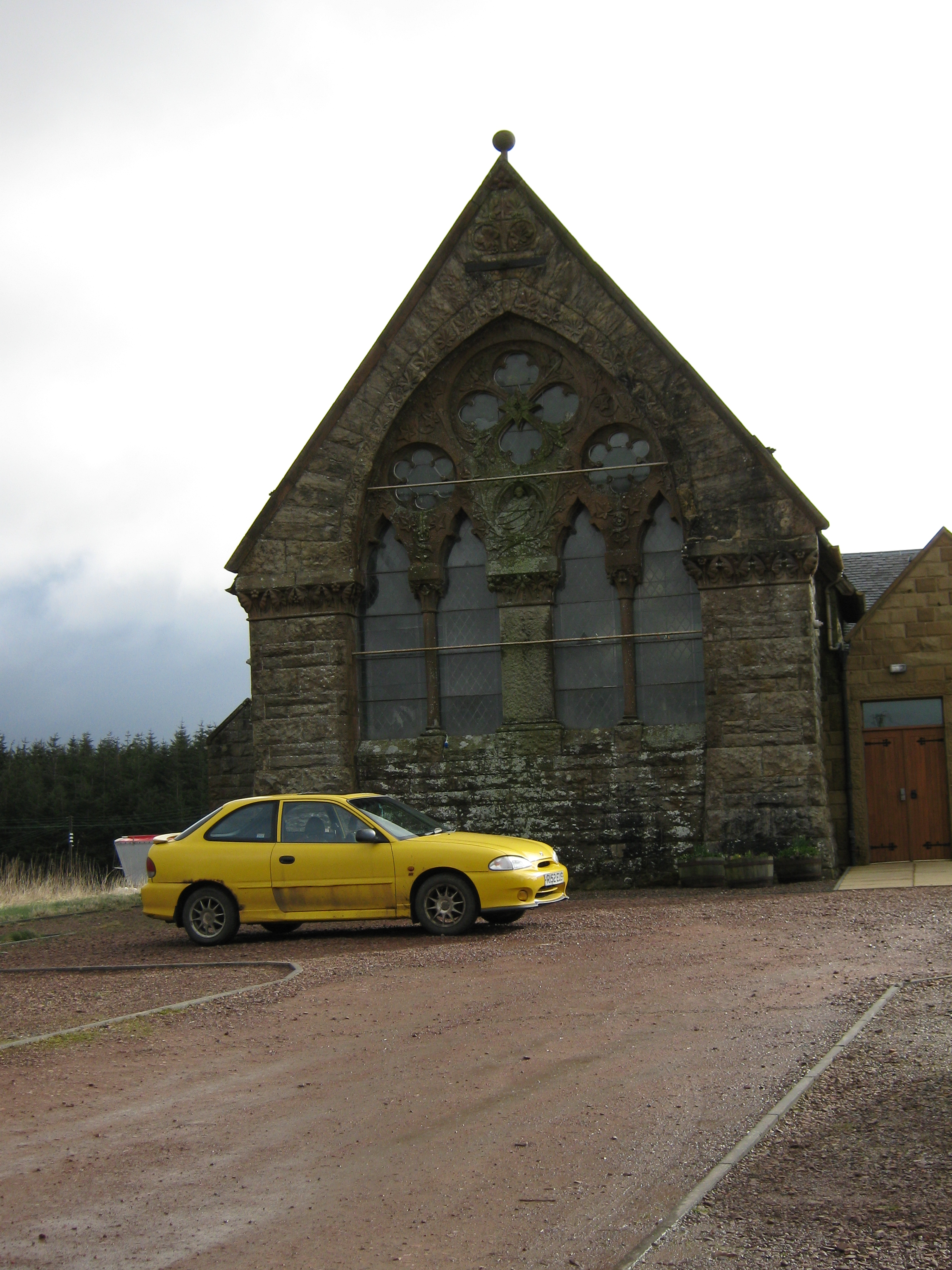
- Auchengray Church

- Location within South Lanarkshire
- Council area: South Lanarkshire
- Lieutenancy area: Lanarkshire
- Country: Scotland
- Sovereign state: United Kingdom
- Post town: LANARK
- Postcode district: ML11
- Dialling code: 01501
- Police: Scotland
- Fire: Scottish
- Ambulance: Scottish
- UK Parliament: Lanark and Hamilton East
- Scottish Parliament: Clydesdale

Auchengray is a small village in South Lanarkshire, Scotland.

== Overview ==
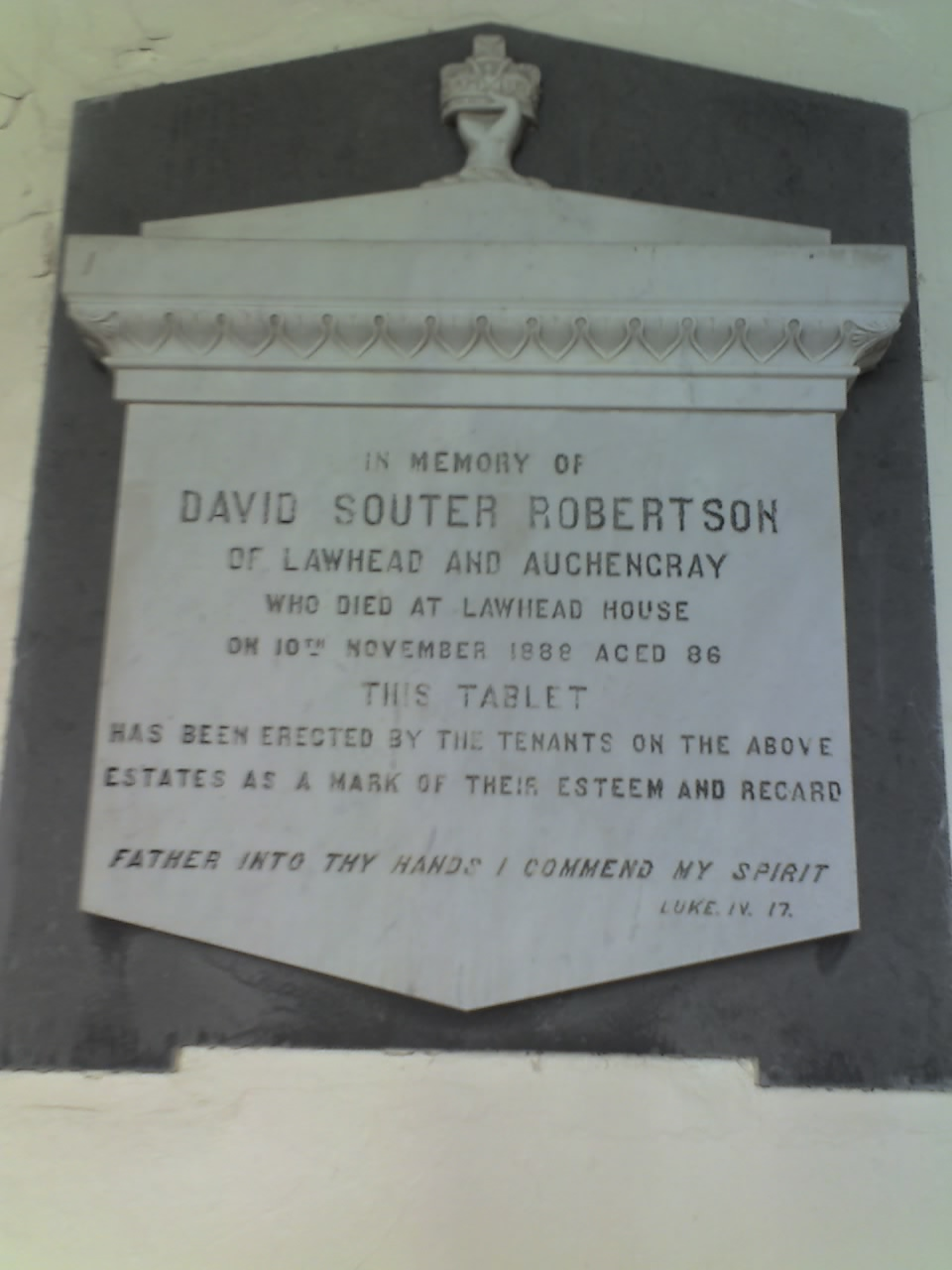
David Souter Robertson Plaque

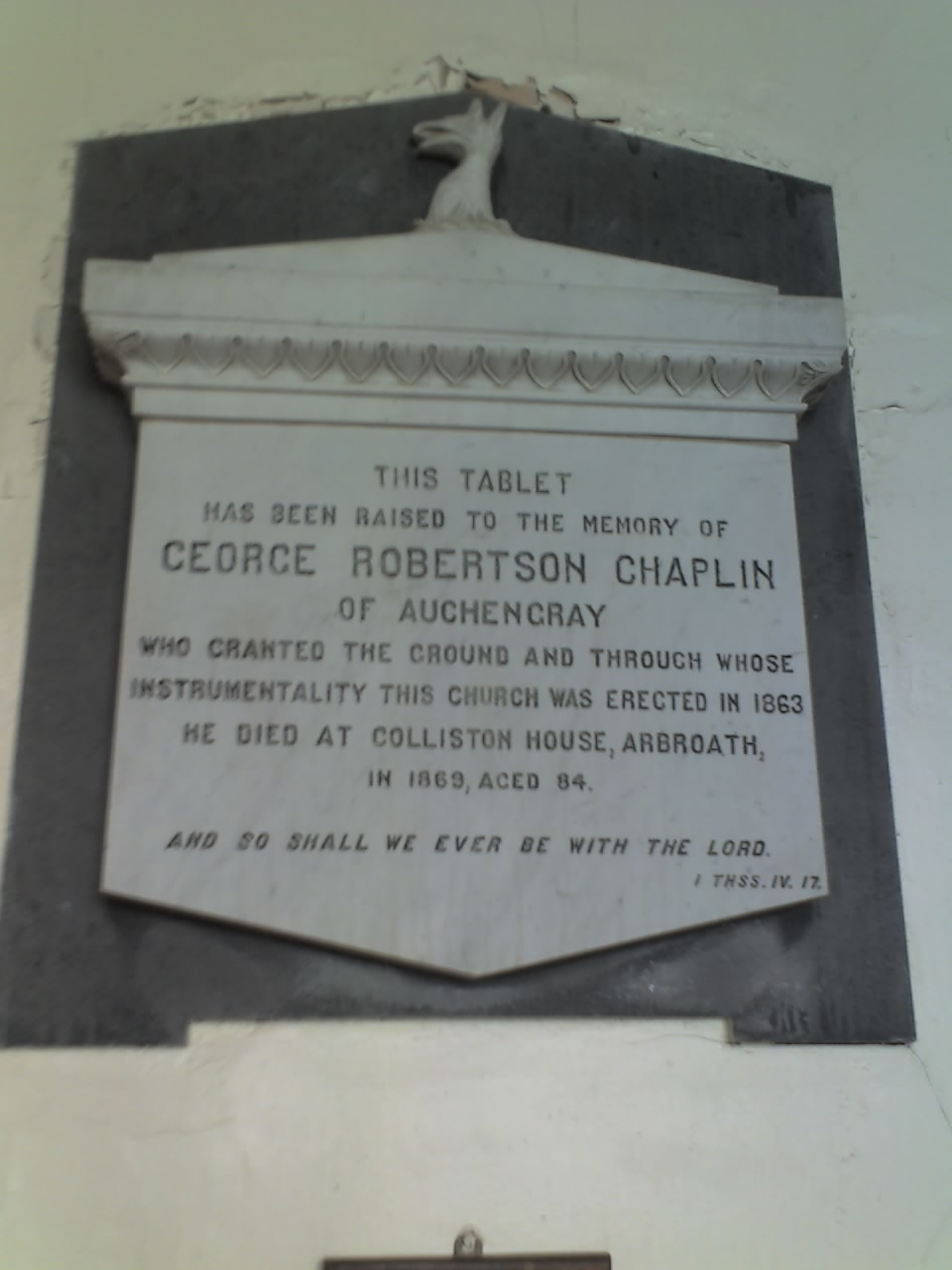
George Robertson Chaplin Plaque

It has a small church whose architect was Frederick Thomas Pilkington (1832–98), the ground given by George Robertson Chaplin (proprietor) of Colliston House, Arbroath, the uncle of David Souter Robertson of Lawhead House nearby, and Murlingden House. The church has two stained glass rose windows, one of which has a spelling error in "Haleluya," though correctly spelled in the original transliteration of the Hebrew הללויה. White marble memorial stones to GRC and DSR, erected by their tenants, are on the back wall.

There was formerly an Auchengray railway station. Next to the former station to the north west there is an abandoned brickworks that produced bricks impressed with the name Auchengray.

Just outside the village is a small abandoned building, which used to belong to the West Lothian Water Board, until 1997 when Auchengray became part of South Lanarkshire.

Nearby are the villages of Tarbrax and Woolfords.

Auchengray is also the location of Auchengray Primary school which is used by the surrounding villages and farms. The school has recently had a new build completed and now has the capacity for teaching primaries one through to seven. The Church hall that was previously used as the school lunch and gym hall now hosts a community cafe on a Thursday afternoon along with a variety of other social clubs.

== See also ==
- List of places in South Lanarkshire
