= Forth, South Lanarkshire =

Coordinates: 55.76581°N 3.68789°W

Forth
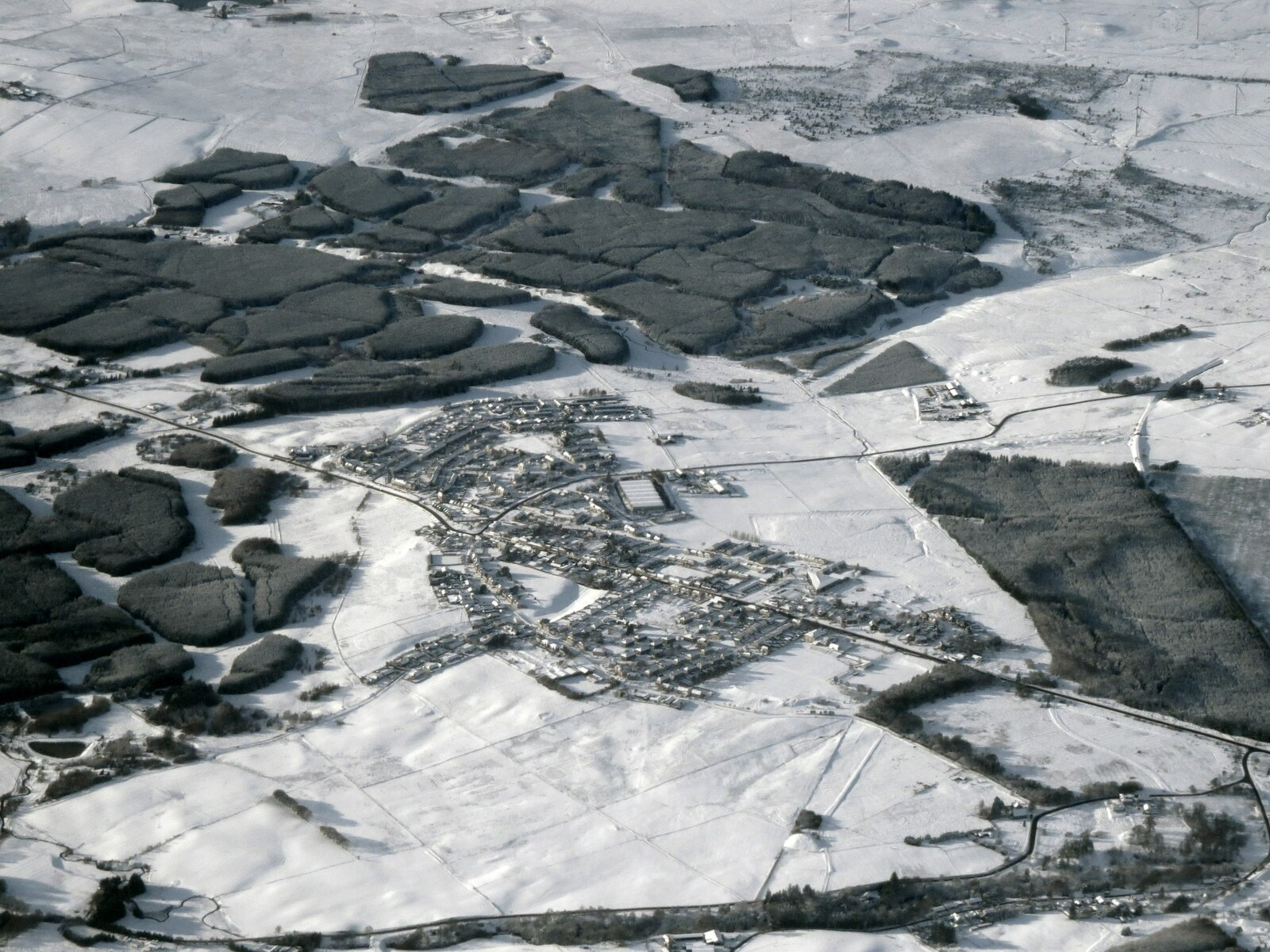
- Aerial view of the village

- Location within South Lanarkshire
- Population: 2,140 (2020)
- OS grid reference: NS9435352017
- Council area: South Lanarkshire
- Lieutenancy area: Lanarkshire
- Country: Scotland
- Sovereign state: United Kingdom
- Post town: LANARK
- Postcode district: ML11
- Dialling code: 01555
- Police: Scotland
- Fire: Scottish
- Ambulance: Scottish
- UK Parliament: Lanark and Hamilton East
- Scottish Parliament: Clydesdale

Forth is a village in South Lanarkshire, Scotland with a population of around 3,500 people. It is situated near Lanark, and stands at around 950 feet (290 metres) above sea level. It is on the A706 road between Lanark (about 12 km to the south west) and Whitburn (a similar distance to the north). It is to the south-east of Climpy.

== History ==
The town of Forth is thought to take its name from the meaning "the open air". The town itself is first mentioned in a great seal charter of 1599. The first jobs available in the town of Forth were thought to be handloom weavers; but after an increase in the town's capacity to 170, these were replaced by different trades such as ironstone, limestone and coal miners. Forth is thus known as a mining village.

Amongst the historic buildings in the village, Forth Parish Church was built in 1875 and the stone used was quarried directly from nearby Hailstonegreen. The first police station in Forth was opened in 1886 and is now home to the local Health Clinic.

The main street garage which still stands today was first opened in the same spot back in 1926 by Sanny Griffin.

Forth Railway Station at Wilsontown was built in 1867. This proved a great success and helped the town move forward. This, however later became obsolete, and was eventually closed in the 1950s.

World war 1 had a devastating effect on the town of Forth: forty-nine men from Forth lost their lives, out of a total population of only 1,000. Their names along with those lost in WW2 are inscribed on the war memorial and on the role of honour in the legion Scotland club room

Some traditions from the past are still going today. In 1932, the first "Queen of Heather" was crowned, and this tradition became part of a gala day for the village of Forth, and has continued until the present day.

Black Law Wind Farm, once the largest on-land windfarm in Britain, is situated in an area bounded by the nearby hamlet of Climpy, and the moorland outskirts of Carluke and Shotts. It is centred about 5 km to the north-west of the village.

Forth is host to an annual Music Festival called the Gentle Giant Music Festival, named after George Gracie.

== Facilities ==
=== Education ===
Forth has a small nursery and primary school and this feeds to Carluke High School. There is a small library attached to the school which is home to several clubs such as a book club for the younger children on Tuesdays. Additionally, there is a youth club held for primary children on a Friday night and for older children on a Monday night.

=== Sports ===
One of the main facilities in Forth is the Sports Centre.

The Centre runs a number of different classes for all ages. There are fitness classes for adults - including gym circuit and body combat classes. There is also a creche for the children of those who wish to use the facilities. Older children can attend classes such as trampolining and gymnastics. There is a gym which is open to everybody aged 14 and over. The halls are available to let out for special occasions; such as parties and conferences.

There are a number of football pitches in Forth. There are lighted pitches, which are free for young children and can be leased by adults. There are also a number of parks where anybody can play for free. Additionally, the local football team, Forth Wanderers own a pitch where they play home matches and have their training sessions.

At the other end of the town, there is a bowling club named Forth & Wilsontown Bowling Club.

=== Others ===
The Haven is a local charity supporting the community of Forth & rural Clydesdale. The Haven offers support to families affected by a life limiting condition such as Cancer, Multiple Sclerosis, Motor Neurone Disease, Huntington's Disease, Parkinson's Disease and Dementia. Support is provided by highly experienced Nurses, Therapists and Volunteers.

Forth also has a doctors' surgery and a chemist.

3.5 kilometers to the north of Forth, just of the A706 road to Fauldhouse, is the hill called Leven Seat. Sat atop the hill is the Leven Seat Buddha. This small effigy of Buddha sits atop the trig point facing eastwards. The effigy used to sit in a small shrine amongst a pile of rocks at the bottom of the hill in the water trough. It was frequently carried to the top of the hill and back down but now sits permanently at the top. It has been painted from its original grey to white and more recently gold.

=== Boys' Brigade and Girls' Association ===
The village also had a Boys' Brigade company, 1st Forth. The company has an anchor section for primary 1–3, a junior section for primary 4-6 and a company section for primary 7 and upwards. Since the BB headquarters passed that companies can now accept girls and so the company now has a Girls' Association that meets at the same time as the boys. The company and junior sections meet on a Thursday night and the anchor section meets on a Friday night.

== Transport ==
There is an hourly bus service run by Stuart's to Lanark, and the Blue Bus Company run a bus to Livingston several times a day.

== Noted residents ==
Famous or noted residents who have lived in, or were born, in Forth include George Gracie who was included in the Guinness Book of Records as Scotland's tallest man, footballer Willie Waddell and musician Billy Ritchie, known as rock music's first lead keyboard player and member of pioneering 60s/70s band Clouds.

== See also ==
- List of places in South Lanarkshire
