= Auchengray railway station =

Disused railway station in Scotland

Auchengray
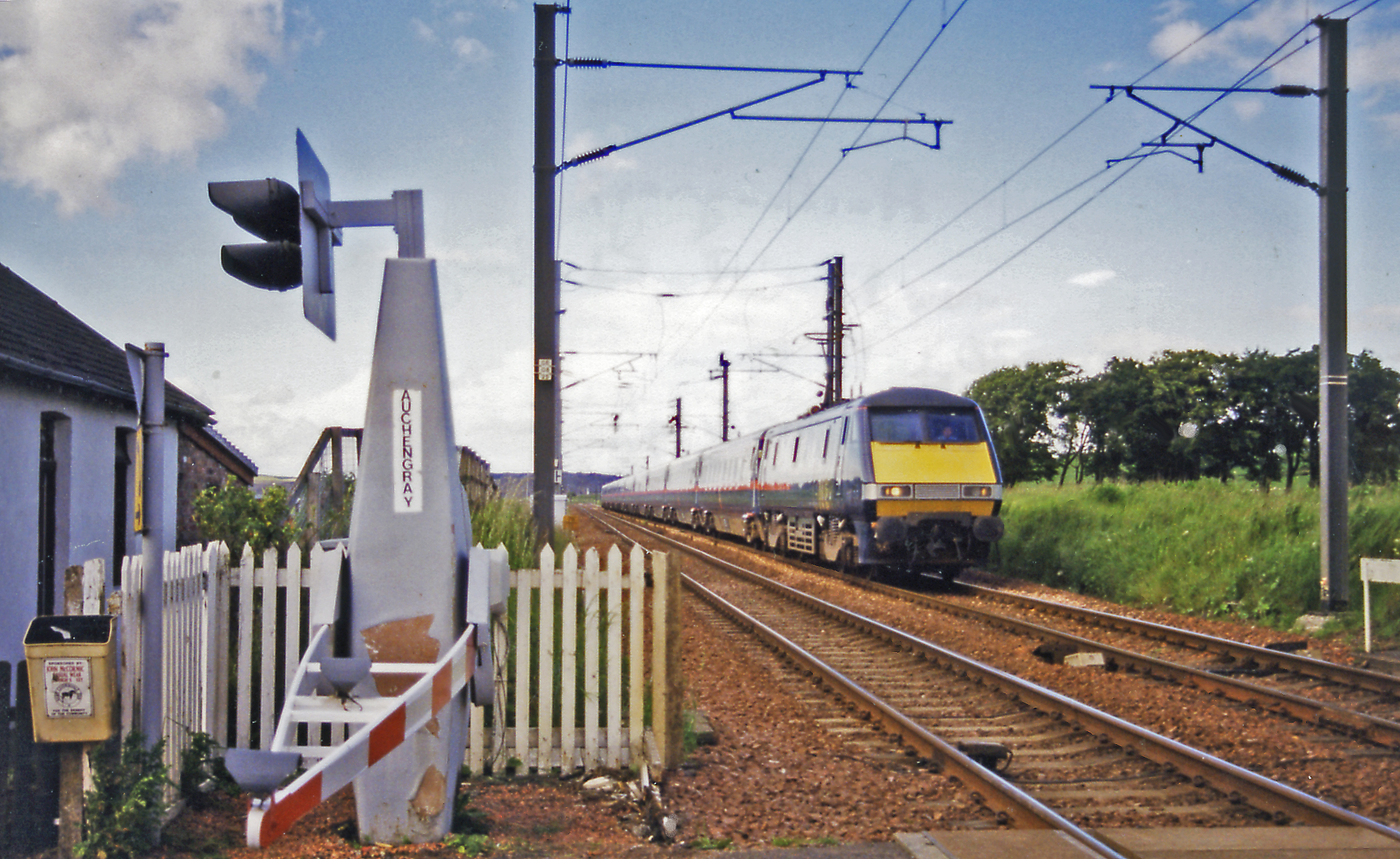
- Site of Auchengray Railway Station

General information
- Location: Auchengray, South Lanarkshire; Scotland
- Coordinates: 55.7634°N 3.6100°W
- Grid reference: NS989533
- Platforms: 2

Other information
- Status: Disused

History
- Original company: Caledonian Railway
- Pre-grouping: Caledonian Railway
- Post-grouping: London Midland and Scottish Railway

Key dates
- 15 February 1848: Station opens
- 18 April 1966: Station closes
Location

Auchengray railway station was just outside Auchengray, a hamlet in the Parish of Carnwath, South Lanarkshire, Scotland. It was served by local trains on what is now known as the West Coast Main Line.

It is near Tarbrax and Woolfords. The Wilsontown Ironworks Branch ran from just to the north.

There is now no station convenient for Auchengray.

== History ==
Opened by the Caledonian Railway it became part of the London Midland and Scottish Railway during the Grouping of 1923, passing on to the Scottish Region of British Railways during the nationalisation of 1948. It was then closed by the British Railways Board.

== The site today ==
Trains pass at speed on the West Coast Main Line but there is no station at the site now.

Preceding station	Historical railways	Following station
Carnwath	Caledonian Railway; Main Line to Edinburgh	Cobbinshaw
Terminus	Caledonian Railway; Wilsontown Ironworks Branch	Haywood
