= Cobbinshaw railway station =

Disused railway station in Scotland

Coordinates: 55.80398°N 3.57816°W

Cobbinshaw

General information
- Location: Scotland
- Platforms: 2

Other information
- Status: Disused

History
- Original company: Caledonian Railway
- Post-grouping: London, Midland and Scottish Railway

Key dates
- 15 February 1848: Opened
- 4 October 1875: Replaced by new station
- 18 April 1966: Closed
Location

Cobbinshaw railway station was on the Caledonian Railway Edinburgh to Carstairs line sited near a village called Woolfords in South Lanarkshire. The freight only branch line to Tarbrax joined here.

The Royal Mail post for the local area was dropped off at Cobbinshaw, so local addresses then had Cobbinshaw as their post district, rather than the current West Calder.

Preceding station	Historical railways	Following station
Harburn; Line open; Station closed	Caledonian Railway Main Line from Edinburgh	Auchengray; Line open; Station closed
