= Tarbrax =

Coordinates: 55.780°N 3.553°W

Tarbrax: Scottish Gaelic: An Tòrr Breac
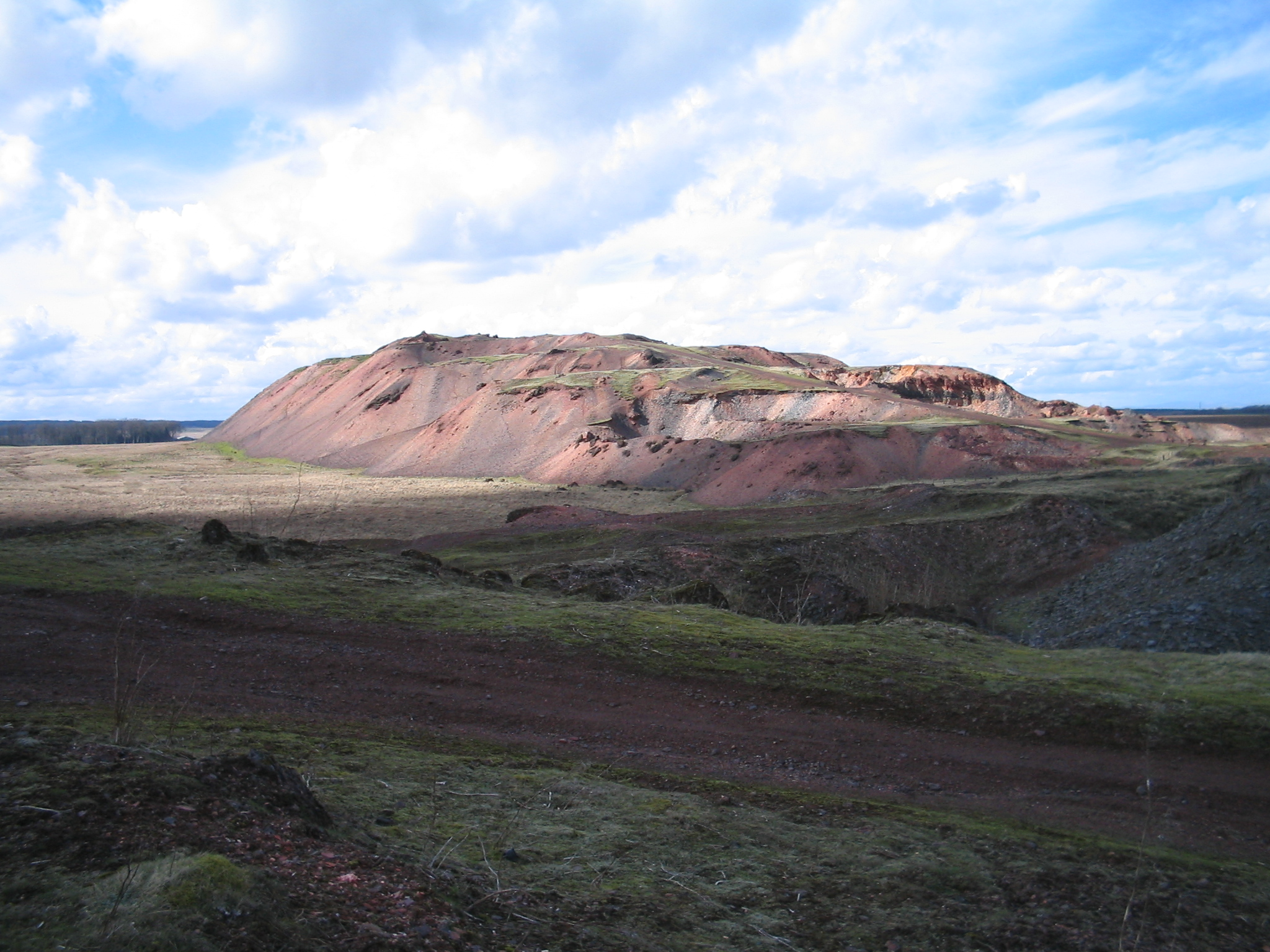
- Tarbrax Bing

- Location within South Lanarkshire
- Council area: South Lanarkshire
- Lieutenancy area: Lanarkshire
- Country: Scotland
- Sovereign state: United Kingdom
- Post town: West Calder
- Postcode district: EH55
- Dialling code: 01501
- Police: Scotland
- Fire: Scottish
- Ambulance: Scottish
- UK Parliament: Lanark and Hamilton East
- Scottish Parliament: Clydesdale

Tarbrax (Scottish Gaelic: "An Tòrr Breac" - meaning "the speckled tor") is a small village in the Parish of Carnwath, South Lanarkshire, Scotland. It is at the end of a dead end road off the A70 road between Edinburgh and Carnwath.

Tarbrax has a population of about 200 and is 290 metres (1,000 ft) above sea level, sitting on the edge of the Pentland Hills. Nearby villages include Auchengray and Woolfords.

== History ==
Tarbrax was built around a shale mine as housing for the miners beginning in the early 20th century. There is a large bing (spent shale spoil heap) in the village. The name is derived from the Lawhead Tarbrax estate within which it was built, which was then owned by David Souter Robertson, a founder of modern Accountancy. This estate was originally based around Tarbrax Castle, a seat of the Somervilles, though by 1649 it had passed to the Lockharts, including George Lockhart of Tarbrax. Nothing remains to be seen of the castle today. The village was a base for American GIs during the Second World War.

The war memorial is by Pilkington Jackson (1920).

== UFO incident ==
The A70 nearby is purportedly the scene of one of Scotland's best-known UFO incidents, now known as 'the A70 incident'. Two men, Garry Wood and Colin Wright, were travelling to Tarbrax one evening in 1992 from the outskirts of Edinburgh . Something evidently caused them to be delayed, for they arrived at their destination much later than expected. Several months later the pair underwent hypnotic regression and claimed to recall that they had been abducted, examined and communicated with by alien creatures.

== Tarbrax today ==
Wind farms have recently been built near Tarbrax, strongly opposed by some members of the local community when first proposed in 2006–2007, warmly welcomed by others. A further recent development is the village hall, which opened in 2004. It runs various groups and activities which include a Youth Club, Badminton group and an over-50s group. A committee of local people of all ages has formed to look into the problem of the football pitch and its surroundings which are considered unsightly, and plans have been made to improve the appearance of this area. As of late August 2012 work had begun by South Lanarkshire Council within the village common green to add drainage and allow for it be used by residents.

== Transport ==
Tarbrax once had its own mineral branch line and loading siding; the branch line led from Cobbinshaw railway station on the Caledonian Railway Edinburgh to Carstairs Line, north of Auchengray railway station. The principal traffic was in connection with shale oil extraction.

== Education ==
Tarbrax formerly had its own school, in the days of the shale mining. The nearest local school now is a small primary in the neighbouring village of Auchengray, which takes children up to Primary 7; the 7 classes are all housed in a brand new build which was completed and first occupied in January 2016. Pupils from Auchengray Primary move on to Biggar High School. All three schools are scheduled to be rebuilt in the next ten to fifteen years.

== Notable people ==
- Neil Cross, author
