= Wilsontown Ironworks =

Ruins of ironworks near Forth in Lanarkshire, Scotland

Coordinates: 55.7766°N 3.6679°W

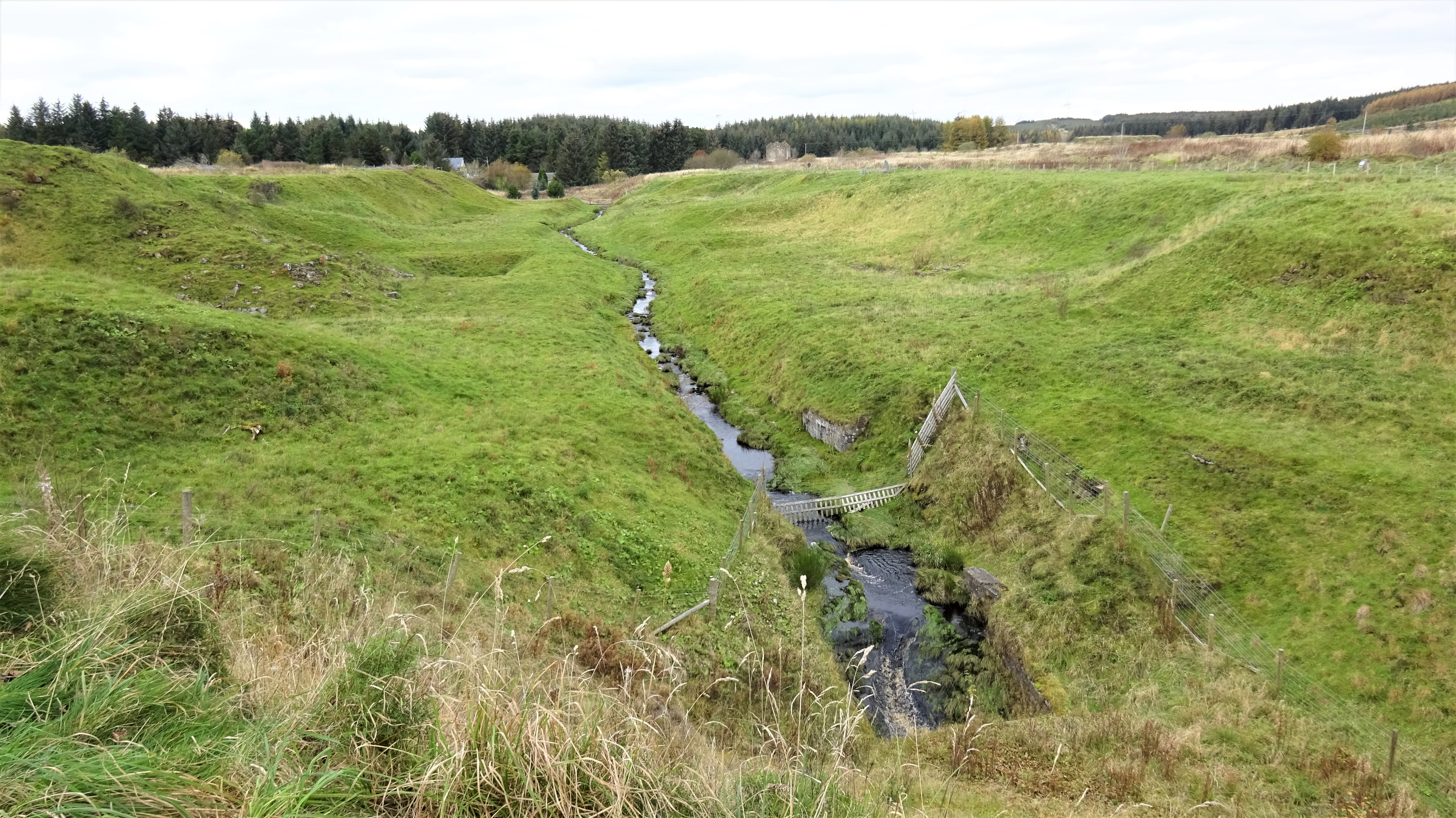
The site of the ironworks

The ruins of the Wilsontown Ironworks are located near the village of Forth in Lanarkshire in Scotland, approximately 23 miles (37 km) to the south east of Glasgow. The ironworks played an important role in the Industrial Revolution.

== Site ==
The ironworks were located on a level area on the floor of the valley of the Mouse Water (a tributary of the River Clyde), also called the Cleugh Burn, standing on both sides of the stream. Its water served for cooling purposes and, perhaps, for driving the forge hammer. "Over the stream a massive culvert was erected, and upon this stood the counting house and the weigh-house".

== History ==
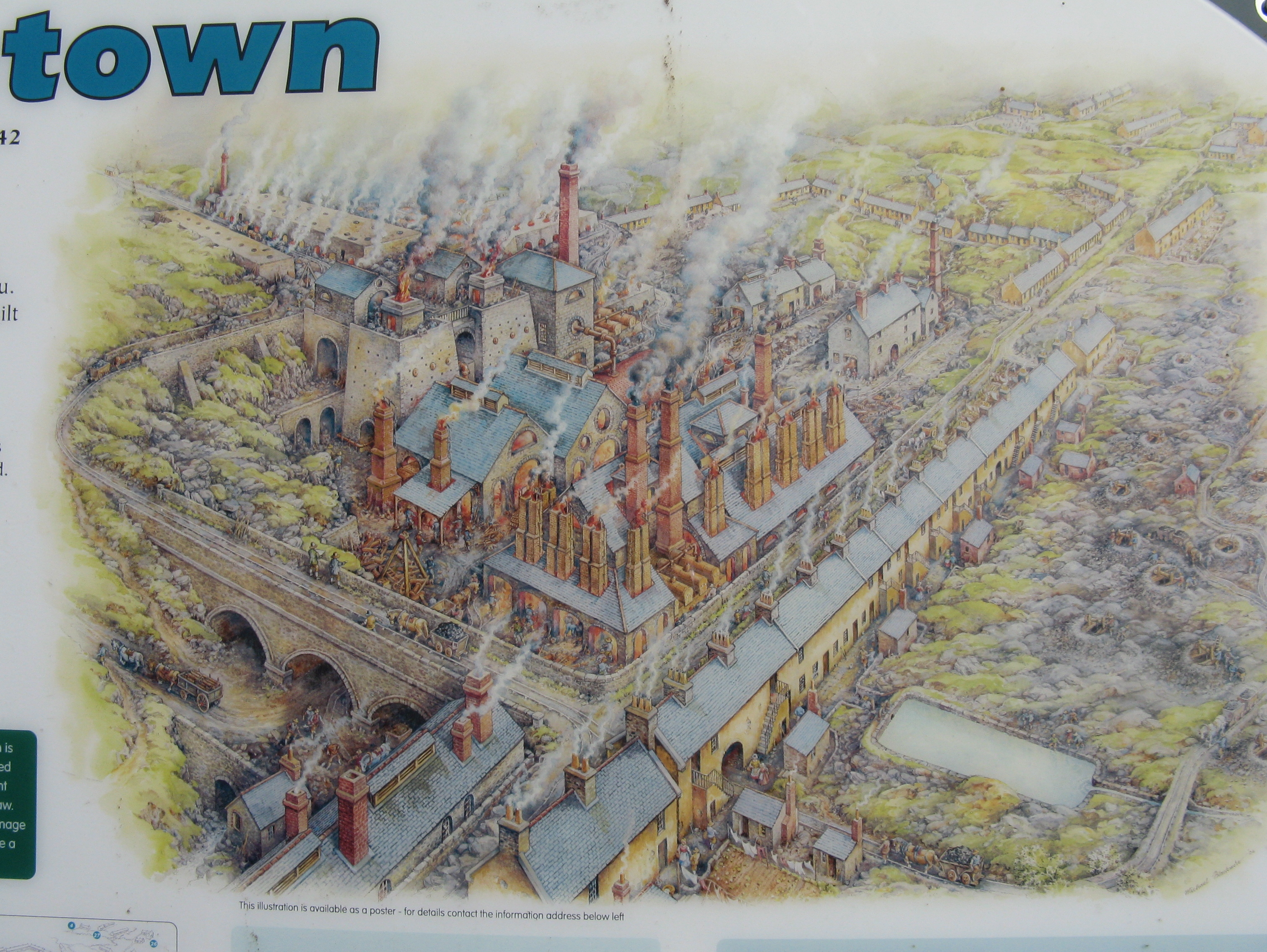
Illustration from an information board showing the ironworks around 1808

=== The Wilson brothers ===
The works were founded by the brothers Robert, John and William Wilson in 1779, but they were not a united family, being beset by quarrels and litigation. Moreover the venture had inherent difficulties. The site was a long way from the nearest port; in the pre-railway age, this meant that iron had to be carried by horse and cart over long distances along poor roads. There was not an adequate supply of coking coal. But the fundamental point was that the Wilsons operated without adequate capital reserves.

Nevertheless, the works had two blast furnaces, and in 1790s a forge was added. By 1804 there was a rolling mill. Donnachie and Butt, scholars who studied the Wilson litigation records, also found that

There were ten "fineries" for the production of "blooms," kilns for calcining iron and limestone, coke ovens, a foundry with air furnaces and cupolas. Extensive wagon-ways ran along a high causeway which circumnavigated the furnaces and connected the works with the limestone, ironstone, and coal workings. Mineral wagon-ways were also built underground to facilitate haulage in the coal mines. There was a lime kiln, a brick-mill, banks of coke, coal, and ironstone, a wright's shop, engine houses for several blowing engines-at first Newcomen-type, but later replaced by more up-to-date Boulton and Watts.

By 1808, 450 houses for workers had been built; there was a bakery, a company store, a school for the children. By 1812 there were nearly 2,000 people in Wilsontown.

The operation could not be made to pay, and could not be sold as a going concern either. By 1812 both furnaces had been extinguished and the site lay idle until 1821. It was sold for a modest sum to William Dixon of Govan Colliery and Calder Ironworks.

=== The Dixons ===
Despite their dynamic management, it seems the Dixons could not make the ironworks pay either, and it was finally closed in 1842.

Even so, the establishment was to play an important role in the Industrial Revolution. It was at Wilsontown that raw pit coal was first successfully used to fuel a blast furnace, with enormous savings of coke; it has been described as "the making of the iron trade in Scotland" and "one of the grandest epochs in the history of the iron manufacture".

==== Wilsontown and Neilson's hot blast process ====
It is sometimes said that it was at Wilsontown that James Beaumont Neilson developed the first hot blast form of the blast furnace, which he patented in 1828. This seems to be a simplification. Neilson's first and crucial experiments were carried out earlier, at the Clyde Iron Works. However, a great virtue of the hot blast process was that it made it possible to use raw coal instead of coke, and this was discovered at Wilsontown, probably by Dixon's manager John Condie. Condie solved the problem by using his invention of the "spiral tuyere", which became an important part of Neilson's hot blast invention. It has been argued that Condie ought properly to be regarded as a co-inventor for that reason.

=== Coal ===
Coal was produced at Wilsontown besides iron. When the ironworks closed, coal continued to be mined, and production did not finally cease until 1955. The colliery was on a nearby site.

== Later ==
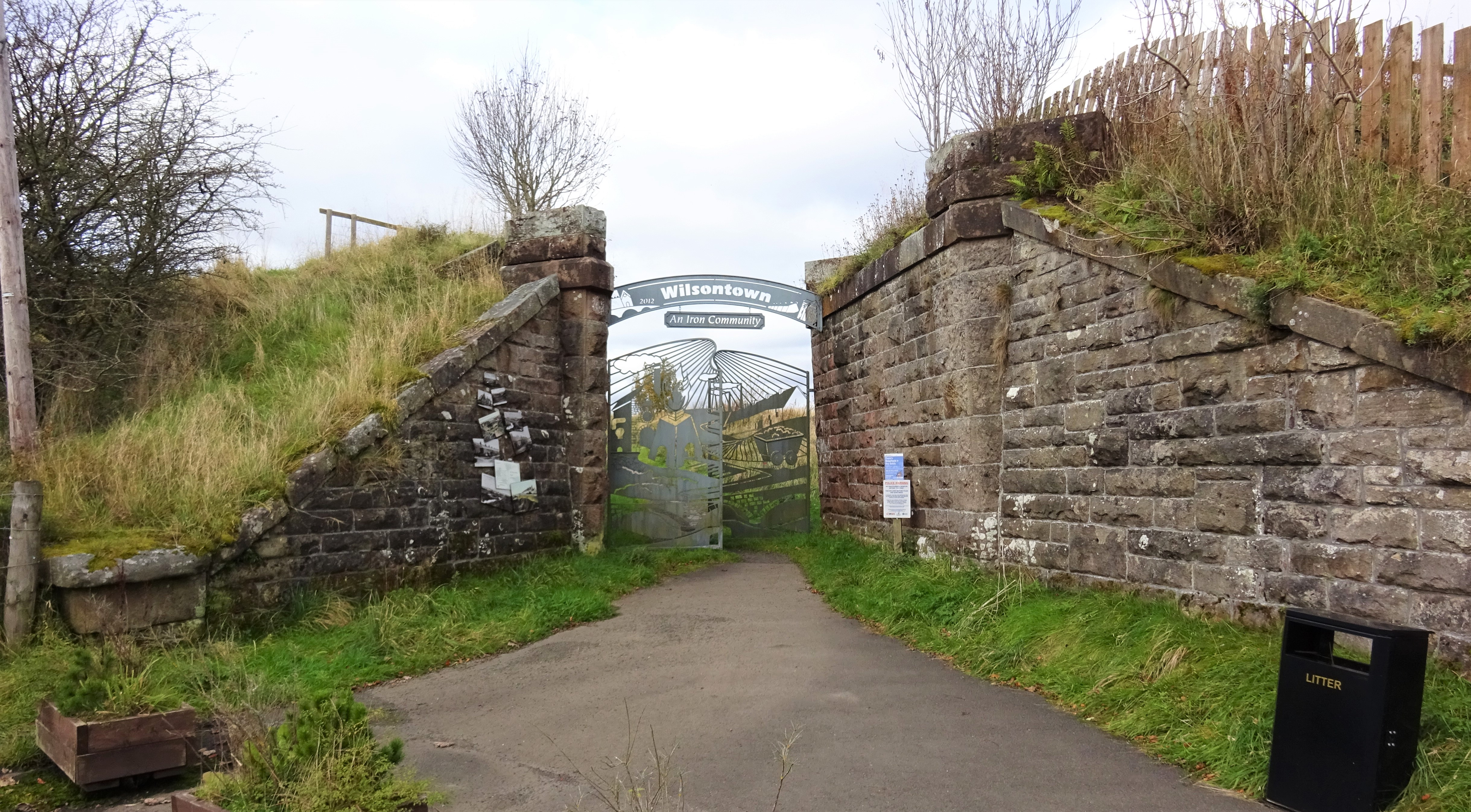
Gateway to the site, between the abutments of a disused rail bridge

From 1870, Wilsontown had a station on a branch line of the Caledonian Railway. The line served several collieries in the area.

The buildings were cleared after closure, but the general layout of the site can still be discerned and a heritage trail has been created. The core of the site is legally protected. It has been designated a scheduled monument since 1968. In 2007 Forestry Commission Scotland, predecessors of Forestry and Land Scotland, the present owners of the site, launched a project to raise public awareness of the Wilsontown Ironworks.

The site is said to be an intriguing one, with "a curious, haunting quality". It has been used to interest primary schoolchildren in industrial archaeology.

== In popular culture ==
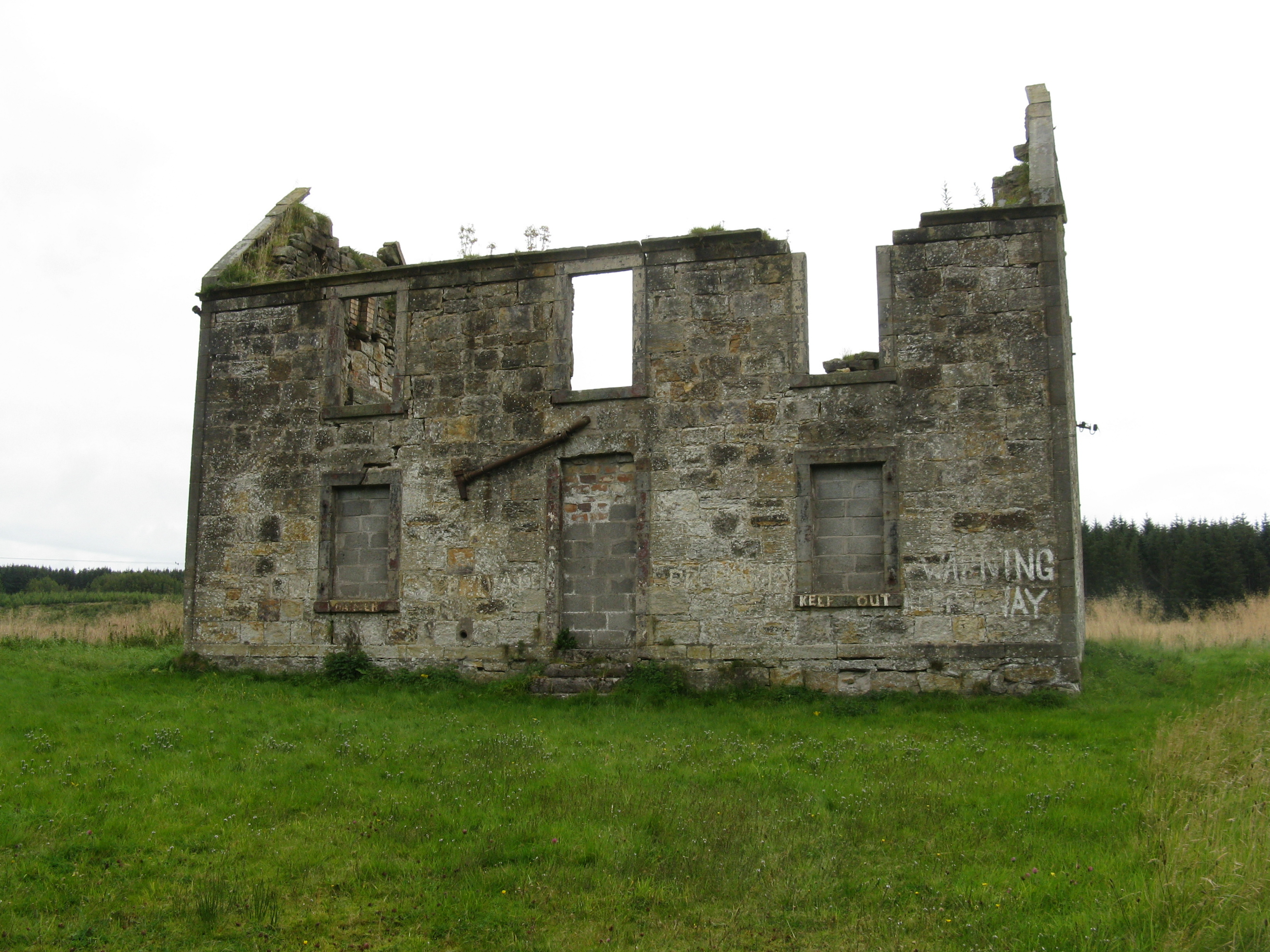
Ruins of the Wilsontown Inn

Wilsontown features in the drinking song We're No Awa' Tae Bide Awa':

As I was walking through Wilson toon
I met wee Johnie Scobie
Says he tae me "Can ye gaun a half?"
Says I, "Man, that's my hobby."

CHORUS: For we're no awa', etc.
