= Carstairs railway station =

Railway station in South Lanarkshire, Scotland

Carstairs Scottish Gaelic: Caisteal Tarrais
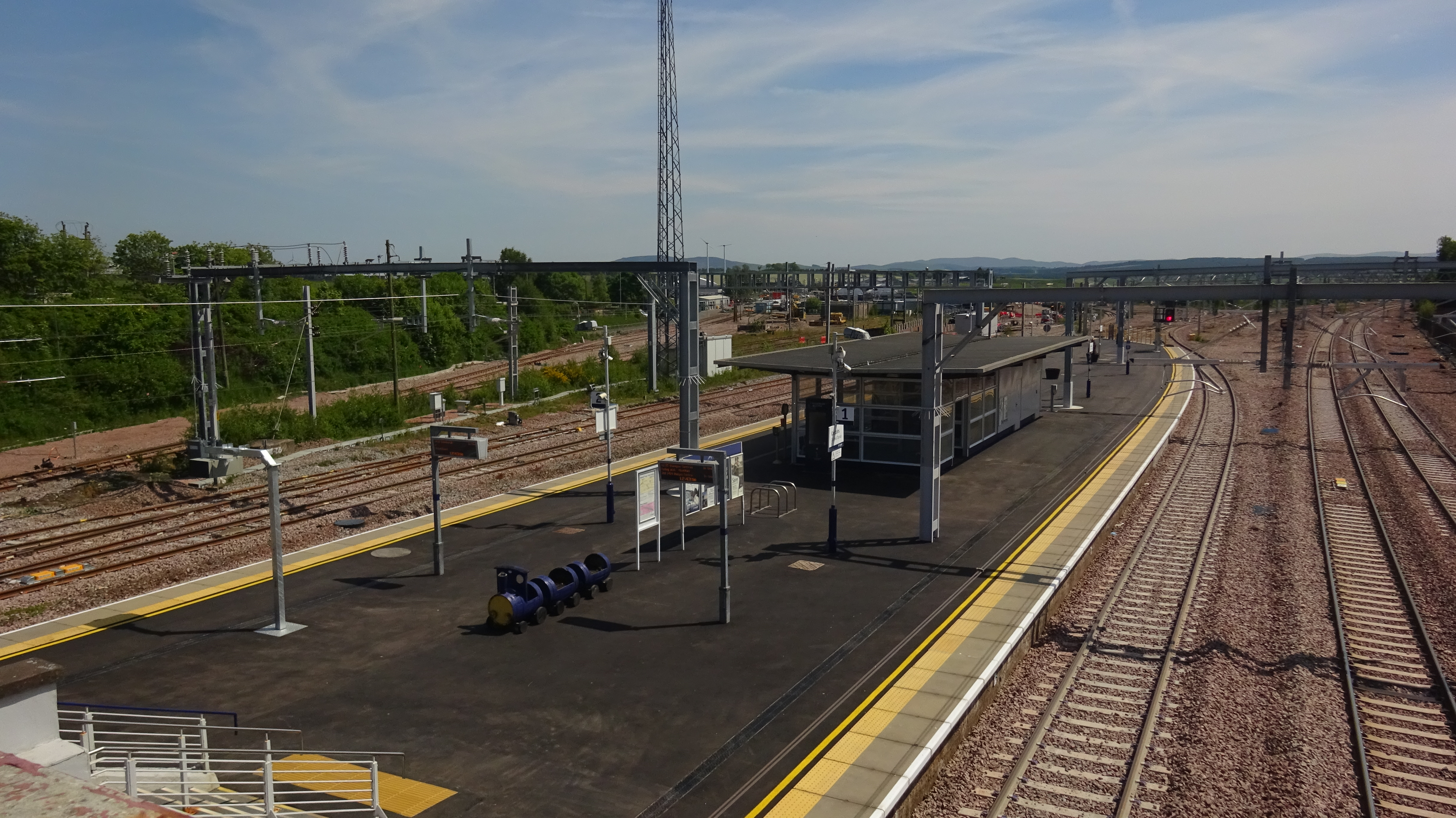

General information
- Location: Carstairs, South Lanarkshire, Scotland
- Coordinates: 55.6913°N 3.6692°W
- Grid reference: NS952454
- Owner: Network Rail
- Manager: ScotRail
- Transit authority: SPT
- Platforms: 2

Other information
- Station code: CRS

History
- Original company: Caledonian Railway
- Pre-grouping: Caledonian Railway
- Post-grouping: London, Midland and Scottish Railway

Key dates
- 15 February 1848: Station opened

Passengers
- 2021/22: ▲6,986
- Interchange: ▲4,804
- 2022/23: ▲13,506
- Interchange: ▲7,067
- 2023/24: ▲28,352
- Interchange: ▼205
- 2024/25: ▲31,886
- Interchange: ▲11,793
- 2025/26: ▲42,348
- Interchange: ▲13,447
Location
Notes
- Passenger statistics from the Office of Rail and Road

Carstairs railway station serves the village of Carstairs, in South Lanarkshire, Scotland. It is a major junction station on the West Coast Main Line (WCML), situated close to the point at which the lines from Edinburgh Waverley and Glasgow Central to London Euston merge. Constructed originally by the Caledonian Railway, the station is managed today by ScotRail which also operates most of the services that call at the station; it is also served by TransPennine Express and Caledonian Sleeper.

== History ==
Construction work started on the site on 30 August 1845 and the station was opened by the Caledonian Railway on 15 February 1848 when the line between Glasgow and Beattock opened. The line from Edinburgh reached Carstairs and opened on 1 April 1848.

By 1855, traffic had increased substantially and the Caledonian Railway spent around £15,000 (equivalent to £1,400,000 in 2025) at Carstairs, increasing capacity to allow incoming trains from Glasgow, Edinburgh and the north to be arranged for their journey south.

In 1885, a correspondent known as Trans-Clyde to the Glasgow Herald reported on the poor state of the platforms at Carstairs:

In the interest of the travelling public whose number is legion, allow me to bring to notice the most urgent and pressing necessity which exists for the directors of the Caledonian Railway taking immediate measures to put the platform at Carstairs Junction into such a condition as shall answer efficiently all the purposes of a railway platform intended for the use of travellers...If you or any of your readers have been to Carstairs railway station, on the opening of the doors of the railway carriage they must have seen that the stone platform on which they are required to alight for the purpose of changing carriages (the main or almost sole object of this station) is several feet below the level of the carriage which they occupy-how many feet in each case I cannot say, as it may vary but lately I took occasion to measure the distance between the platform and the floor of a carriage from which I had managed to descend, and found it to be 3 feet 4 inches at least.

From 1888 to 1895, the station was also the terminus of the Carstairs House Tramway which connected to Carstairs House.

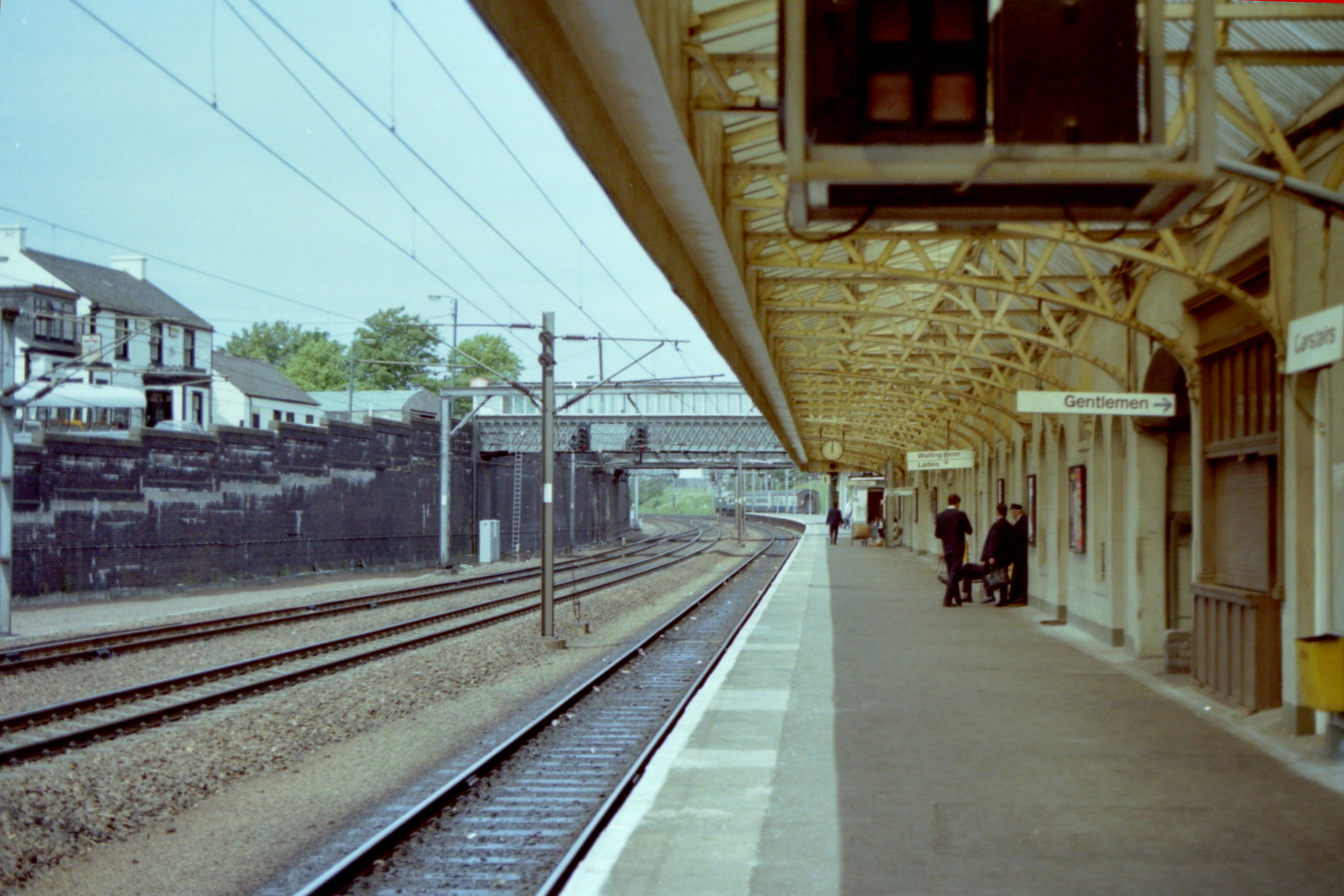
The down platform and the old station building in June 1983

Between 1914 and 1916, the Caledonian Railway began an extensive reconstruction of the station. The existing island platform buildings were remodelled with new windows and doors; the exterior was given a dressed stonework finish. The accommodation comprised ladies’ and gentlemen's waiting rooms, a telegraph office, a tea room and offices for the station staff. The buildings extended to 300 feet (91 m), with steel and glass platform canopies which extended beyond the length of the platform building.

The platforms were raised in height and extended in length to around 1,000 feet (300 m). The constricted layout of only one set of up and down through lines was expanded with the provision of loop lines for both up and down trains to allow non-stop trains to bypass any trains stopped at the station. The improvements were prepared under the direction of W.A. Paterson, the engineer-in-chief of the company. The contract for the reconstruction was won by John Shirlaw of Carluke. The reconstruction cost was £22,391, equivalent to £1,680,000 in 2025.

The London, Midland and Scottish Railway constructed an experimental locomotive, LMS 6399 Fury. On a test run from Glasgow to Carstairs on 10 February 1930, it was approaching Carstairs station at slow speed when one of the ultra-high-pressure tubes burst and the escaping steam ejected the coal fire through the fire-hole door, killing Lewis Schofield of the Superheater Company.

=== Electrification ===
The route through the station was electrified in the 1974 electrification scheme that covered the WCML between Weaver Junction and Glasgow Central. The station was resignalled, with the original mechanical signal box removed and the junction now being controlled remotely from a new power signal box at Motherwell. The critical point was the connection from Edinburgh on a minimum radius curve to provide a connection into the down platform, whilst avoiding the installation of a diamond crossing.

The provision of superelevation through the up platform for 90 mph (140 km/h) running required deep ballasting; this required the platform to be raised. The original station buildings were being retained, and continuous railings were provided to prevent passengers accidentally falling down from one level to the other. This height difference has now been removed as the original station buildings were demolished and replaced with a more modern alternative and the entire platform was levelled off. The only remnant of the original station buildings was the integral footbridge, now adapted as a stand-alone structure.

The route to Edinburgh was not part of the 1970s scheme; however, it was included as part of the late 1980s East Coast Main Line (ECML) scheme, with electric services starting to use the line in 1989.

=== Remodelling of Carstairs Junction (2023) ===
Network Rail closed the station temporarily from 4 March to 30 May 2023, as part of a major upgrade to the junction south of the station; this was to make it more reliable and better able to cope with future passenger and freight demands.

New track sections, overhead lines, signalling and telecoms were installed, with improvements to station platforms, embankments and drainage across the junction. This would see line speeds through Carstairs increased significantly, a freight loop capable of holding trains of up to 775 metres (2,543 ft) and allowing possibilities for the station to become more accessible in the future, as no step free access from platform to street is currently available.

=== Historical services ===
Carstairs was an important junction station where northbound West Coast Main Line trains were split into separate portions for Glasgow, Edinburgh and (to a lesser extent) Stirling and Perth, and for the corresponding combining of southbound trains. However, the introduction of push-pull operation on the WCML and the availability of surplus HST sets for cross-country traffic, as a result of the ECML electrification, largely eliminated this practice in the early 1990s.

Apart from the sleeping car trains, express traffic through Carstairs now consists of fixed-formation trains, which do not require to be remarshalled en route. As a result, few express trains now call at Carstairs. There were some local stopping services to Edinburgh and Glasgow, but they were relatively infrequent. Before December 2012, only two trains per day to North Berwick called and only five trains to Glasgow (Note: Three trains went to Dalmuir, two to Central and one terminated at Motherwell.) There were very large gaps in between trains with the two Edinburgh-bound trains calling at 07:49 and then again at 15:40; similarly, for the Glasgow trains there was a gap from 07:55 to 18:41.

==== 2019 ====
Prior to March 2020 on Monday to Saturdays, there was a roughly two-hourly service to both Glasgow Central and Edinburgh Waverley, with a few longer gaps for most of the day, with a few services extended to Ayr and North Berwick; the last westbound service from Edinburgh terminates at Motherwell.

There were also a few extra trains operated by ScotRail to/from Glasgow Central Low Level which call at peak times. These operated to Motherwell, Garscadden and Dalmuir. These services did not run on Saturdays, so a slightly reduced service operated from the station in the morning.

In addition, TransPennine Express also provided one train per day to Glasgow Central and one train per day to Liverpool Lime Street, via Preston.

== Layout ==
Just south of the station, there is an important triangular junction (Carstairs Junction) where the WCML divides. The north-westerly route goes via Motherwell to Glasgow and the north-easterly route goes towards Edinburgh, where the ECML begins. The southbound route goes towards Carlisle and London Euston. Carstairs is also a marshalling point and the final boarding point (Note: For both the sleeping car and overnight coach.) in Scotland for the Lowland Caledonian Sleeper trains from Glasgow and Edinburgh to London.

Before the 2023 remodelling, the layout of the station saw platform 1 lie on the down platform loop with platform 2 served by the up main. Trains from Carlisle and further south that did not need to call at Carstairs could bypass the station on the down main. While both platforms were signalled bi-directionally, trains from the Edinburgh direction could only be signalled into platform 1. Additionally, the junction south of the station for trains heading towards or from Edinburgh was limited to 15 mph (24 km/h) and presented a bottleneck for operations.

The 2023 remodelling altered this considerably. The main lines now pass to the west of the station, enabling the line speed to be raised and the station now lies on a loop with both platforms remaining signalled for bi-directional operation. These can now both be accessed from any direction - removing another restriction - and new loops for passing freight and slower passenger trains have been constructed north of the station. Finally, the junction south of the station has been rebuilt and the speed raised to 40 mph (64 km/h).

== Services ==
Carstairs is served by three train operating companies; they provide the following general service pattern in trains per hour/day (tph/tpd):

ScotRail:

- 1 tp2h to Glasgow Central
- 1 tp2h to Edinburgh Waverley.

TransPennine Express:

- 1 tpd to Glasgow Central.

Caledonian Sleeper:

- 1 tpd to Glasgow Central
- 1 tpd to Edinburgh Waverley
- 1 tpd to London Euston.

Preceding station	National Rail	Following station
Kirknewton or Haymarket	ScotRail; Argyle Line	Carluke
Carlisle	Caledonian Sleeper; West Coast Main Line	Motherwell
Carlisle	Caledonian Sleeper; West Coast Main Line	Edinburgh Waverley
Lockerbie	TransPennine Express; Anglo-Scottish Route	Motherwell
	Historical railways	
Thankerton; Line open; station closed	Caledonian Railway Main Line to Greenhill Junction	Cleghorn; Line open; station closed
Thankerton; Line open; station closed	Caledonian Railway Main Line from Edinburgh	Carnwath; Line open; station closed
Terminus	Dolphinton Branch; Caledonian Railway	Bankhead; Line and station closed
