= Michael Walker =

Michael Walker may refer to:

== Arts and entertainment ==
- Michael Patrick Walker, American composer/lyricist
- Michael A. Walker, English writer of film and television
- Michael Walker (filmmaker) (born 1967), American filmmaker
- Michael Walker, keyboardist of Paradise Fears
- DCS Michael 'Mike' Walker, a character in the British television series Trial & Retribution

== Politics ==
- Michael Walker (diplomat) (1916–2001), British ambassador
- Michael Walker, Baron Walker of Aldringham (born 1944), former British Chief of the Defence Staff
- Michael Walker (politician) (born 1941), Canadian politician
- Michael Walker (British journalist), political journalist and commentator for Novara Media

== Sports ==
- Michael Walker (cyclist) (1885–1971), British Olympic cyclist
- Mickey Walker (boxer) (1901–1981), American professional boxer in the 1920s
- Mickey Walker (American football) (1939–2014), American football player, New York Giants 1961–1966
- Mick Walker (footballer, born 1940) (1940–2025), English football player and manager
- Mickey Walker (footballer) (born 1945), English football player and administrator
- Mickey Walker (golfer) (born 1952), English golfer
- Michael Walker (American football) (born 1996), American football player
- Michael Walker (jockey) (born 1984), New Zealand jockey
- Mike Walker (tennis) (born 1966, Michael Walker), Welsh tennis player
- Michael Walker (Paralympian), British track and field athlete

== Other ==
- Michael Walker (economist) (born 1945), Canadian economist
- Michael Walker (knifemaker) (born 1949), knifemaker who invented the Walker Linerlock mechanism
- Michael Walker (biologist), biologist at University of Auckland
- Michael Walker (mathematician) (1947–2018), English mathematician
- Michael Walker, convicted spy and son of convicted Soviet spy and American traitor John Anthony Walker
- Michael "Pee Wee" Walker, murder victim killed by Adam Kelly Ward
- Michael Walker, a Luke Air Force Base member known for his actions that saved 28 lives during the 2020 Westgate Entertainment District shooting

== See also ==
- Mike Walker (disambiguation)
- Mick Walker (disambiguation)
