= Forward intelligence team =

UK uniformed police who surveil public gatherings

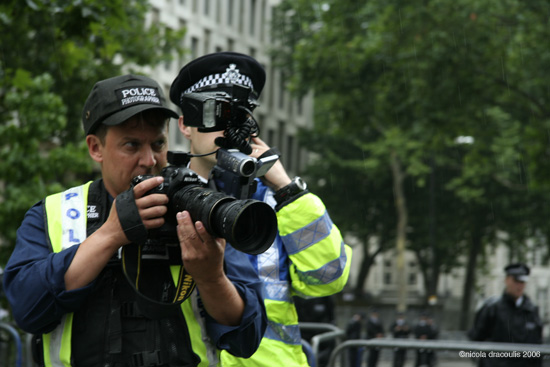
Forward Intelligence Team outside the US embassy, London

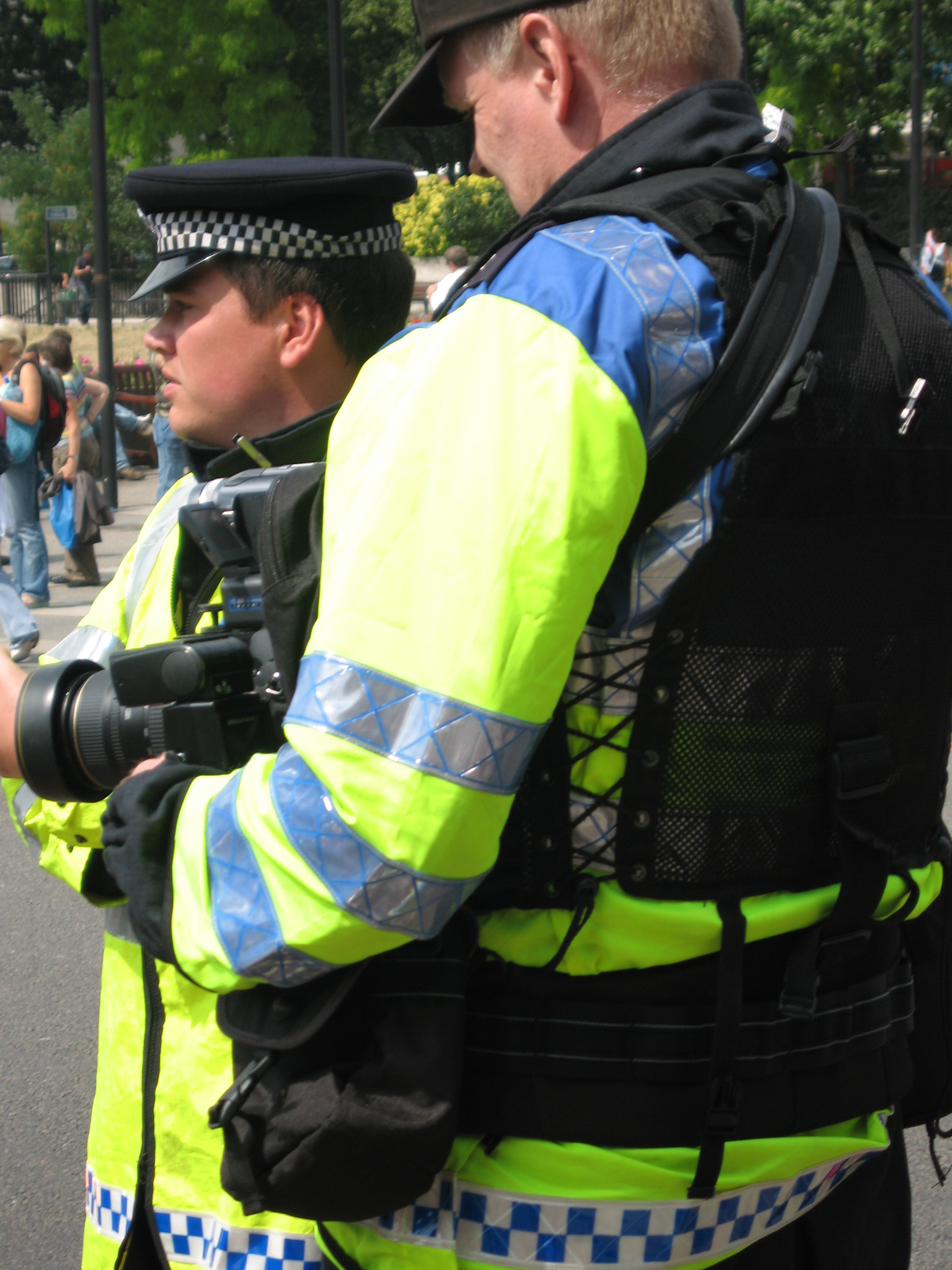
A Forward Intelligence Team officer

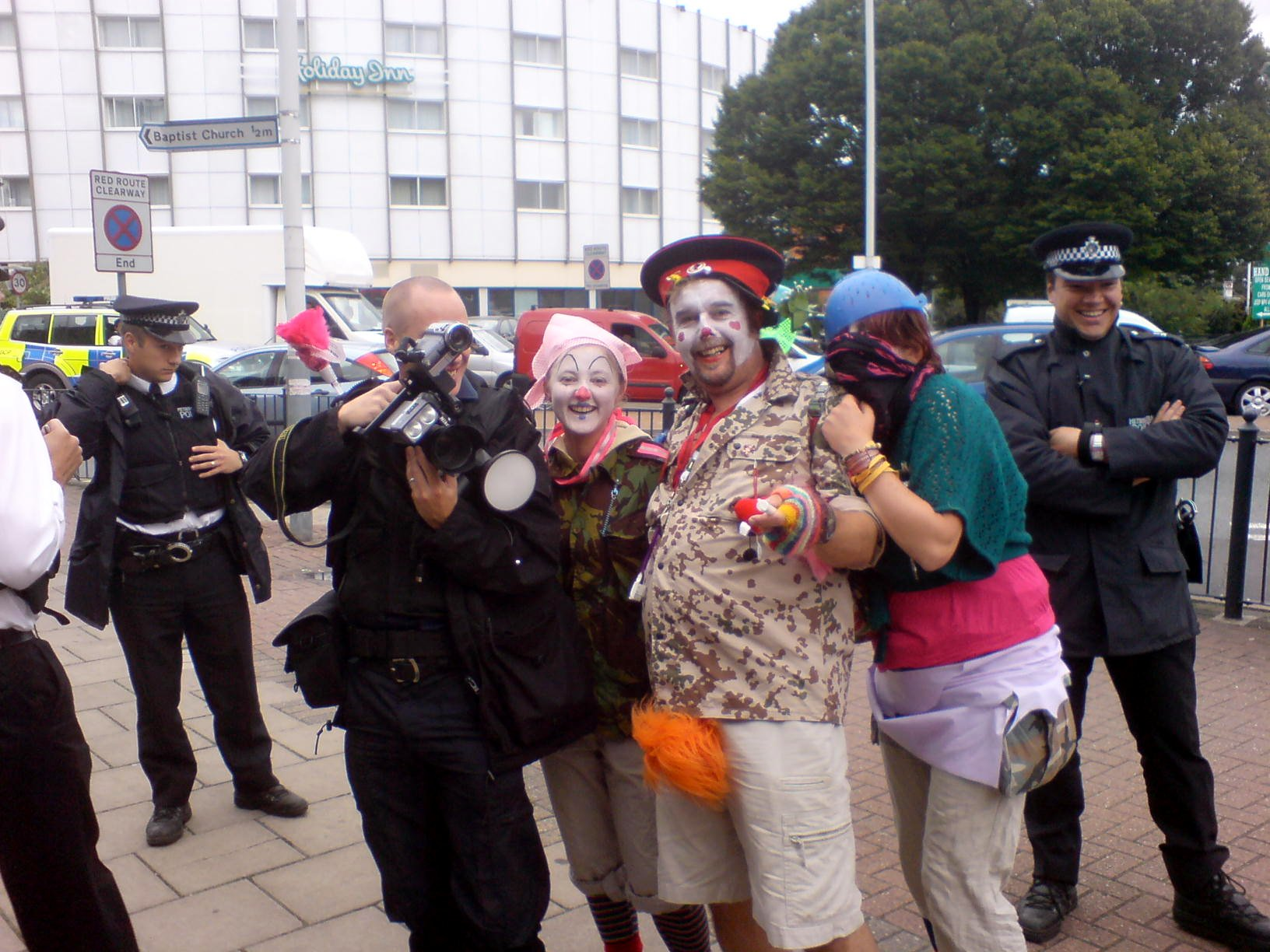
A FIT photographer and protesters at the Camp for Climate Action, Heathrow 2007

Forward Intelligence Teams (FITs) are two or more police officers who are deployed by UK police forces to gather intelligence on the ground and in some circumstances, to disrupt activists and deter anti-social behaviour. They use cameras, camcorders and audio recorders to conduct overt surveillance of the public. An unsuccessful legal challenge has been made against their use of overt surveillance, but in 2009 the Court of Appeal ruled that they must justify retention of photographs on a case-by-case basis. Any retained information is recorded on the Crimint database.

Political activists have criticised FITs and said that they feel the aim of FIT deployment during protests is to prevent legal protests. Journalists have also complained that FITs attempt to stop them photographing protests and that they conduct surveillance of journalists. A campaign group, Fitwatch, formed in 2007 that aim to obstruct FITs and conduct sousveillance on the officers. Two members of the group were arrested at the 2008 Climate Camp on obstruction charges. A similar police surveillance unit, the Video Intelligence Unit is operated by Greater Manchester Police. In June 2010, the Home Office announced it would review the use of FITs during public order policing.

== History and purpose ==
FITs were first formed in the early 1990s, as part of the Public Order Intelligence Unit (CO11), a section of the Public Order Branch of the Metropolitan Police. They initially targeted football fans, hunt saboteurs and political protesters (since at least 1996), using cameras, camcorders and audio recorders to conduct overt surveillance of the public. The police officers wear full uniform, and are intended to be a highly visible presence. Their uniform is sometimes different from normal police officers in that the upper half of their yellow fluorescent jackets is blue. Civilian photographers are also employed by the police to work alongside FITs. According to Scotland Yard, the aim of FIT teams at protests is to record evidence of protesters in case disorder occurs later on at a protest.

More recently the teams' purpose has been extended to routine police work on low-level crime and anti-social behaviour and police forces throughout the UK now have their own FITs. Despite the implication in their name that their function is to merely gather intelligence, they are also intended to have a deterrent effect. This approach has been reported to work in reducing reports of anti-social behaviour at times when FITs are deployed in specific neighbourhoods. Jacqui Smith, then Home Secretary praised Operation Leopard that used FITs to target youths, in Laindon, Essex stating:

"Operation Leopard is exactly the sort of intensive policing that can bring persistent offenders to their senses... Relentless filming of them and their associates throughout the day and night"

Linda Catt, an activist, has suggested that their tactics are "designed to intimidate people and prevent lawful dissent". This view is echoed by a police debriefing of their operations at the 2008 Camp for Climate Action which praised FITs at the event for disrupting activists.

In June 2010, the Home Office announced it would review the use of FITs during public order policing. The move was influenced by the discovery that information collected by FITs, included that which was unrelated to suspected crimes, for example recording who made speeches at demonstrations.

In October 2010, FIT officers in plain clothes were spotted by a press photographer at a protest against companies avoiding tax, despite Commander Bob Broadhurst telling a parliamentary committee in May 2009, that only uniformed officers distinguishable by their blue and yellow jackets were involved in gathering intelligence at protests. The Metropolitan Police told The Guardian that it was necessary to deploy plain-clothed officers to "gather information to provide us with a relevant and up-to-date intelligence picture of what to expect". It was the first time that FITs are known to have been deployed in plain clothes.

== Legal issues ==
Liberty brought a judicial review of the overt surveillance practices in May 2008, which was decided in favour of the police, however the police were asked to clarify their evidence to the Court of Appeal, following an investigation by The Guardian newspaper.

In May 2009, the Court of Appeal ruled that photographs collected by FITs of people who have not committed a criminal offence can no longer be kept. The ruling was made after Andrew Wood, an arms trade activist, was photographed after challenging the management of Reed Elsevier at their AGM over them organising arms trade exhibitions. Wood argued that police had harassed him and infringed his right to privacy by photographing him. Lord Collins of Mapesbury said that the police presence had a "chilling effect" on people who were protesting lawfully. FITs have not been banned but they must now justify the retention of photographs on a case-by-case basis. As a result of the ruling the Metropolitan Police's public order unit, CO11 was forced to delete 40% of the photos of protesters that it held.

In a report about the policing of the 2009 G-20 London summit protests, Denis O'Connor, the chief inspector of constabulary, stated that the routine use of FITs at protests "raises fundamental privacy issues and should be reviewed". He also said that there was "confusion" over the role of FITs and advised that the Home Office should issue guidance over the legality of the surveillance of protesters and the retention of images.

== Information processing ==
A "spotter card" used by FITs at protests and political meetings. This was dropped by a police officer at the DSEi arms fair in 2005 and later published by The Guardian.

The information that FITs collect is stored on the Crimint database, which is used daily by police officers to catalogue criminal intelligence. People are listed by name allowing police to determine which events individuals have attended. Photographs obtained by FITs are used to produce "spotter cards" consisting of people's photographs which allows officers to identify people at future events that they attend. For £10, people are able to obtain a list of protests that they have attended from the data held on Crimint under laws in the Data Protection Act 1998.

== Academic response ==
A 2006 report, The Economics of Mass Surveillance calculated that the use of FITs at mass gatherings involves gathering intelligence on roughly 1,200 people to record the actions of one person. The report also noted that most of the people on "spotter cards", used by the police photographers, were those involved in the organisation of protests and that FITs also attend meetings where demonstrations are organised.

== Criticism ==
Fitwatch (formed in early 2007) campaign against FITs by actively obstructing their operations, and by passively opposing their operations by photographing units (a form of sousveillance).

In June 2009,The Guardian released video evidence recorded by an FIT at the 2008 Climate Camp of alleged police brutality against two female members of Fitwatch. The women had asked police officers to reveal their shoulder numbers, as at least four officers had not displayed them. The women attempted to photograph the police officers for evidence, but were forced to the ground, restrained with handcuffs, and had their legs bound with straps. They were then placed in restraint positions, arrested, charged and held in custody for four days, including three days in HMP Bronzefield, before they were released on bail. The police later retracted all the charges against the women. The women lodged a complaint with the IPCC over the incident. The journalist George Monbiot commented on this case, saying that "the police are turning activism into a crime" and that "the FITs' methods appear to have been lifted from a Stasi training manual". He claimed that "anybody who is politically active is filmed, identified, monitored, logged, and cross-checked". A police debrief into the operation at Kingsnorth praised the deployment of FITs saying that they were "highly effective and gained good intelligence and disruption".

Three members of Fitwatch were convicted for obstructing FIT officers in June 2008 as they attempted to photograph those attending a No Borders meeting in London. In July 2010 the Inner London Crown Court overturned the men's convictions, with the judge stating that the protesters' human rights may have been violated by the FIT officers.

On 15 November 2010, the hosts of the Fitwatch blog were asked by the Police National E-Crime Unit to take down the website due to it "being used to undertake criminal activities". The request came after a post on the blog after the 2010 student protest in London, which advised students of actions they should take if they were concerned that they were photographed at the demonstration, such as cutting their hair and disposing of clothing they were wearing. Emily Apple, one of the founders of the site told The Guardian, "Nothing in that post [giving guidance to student protesters] has not been said before on our blog or on other sites". On 17 November 2010, the Fitwatch website returned, hosted on a web server outside of the UK.

The National Union of Journalists (NUJ) has criticised FITs for their surveillance and sometimes violent harassment of working journalists. Marc Vallée, who was hospitalised by police after documenting a protest, has said that the teams limit freedom of the press and called on the Home Office to confirm that the police had no right to restrict the work of photojournalists. Bob Broadhurst, who is in charge of public order policing at the Metropolitan Police, said in a statement to the NUJ in 2008 that journalists, "on the production of a valid form of accreditation will be able to continue with their work". The NUJ are to make a formal complaint to the Information Commissioner due to the Metropolitan Police failing to provide details on the surveillance of journalists under the Freedom of Information Act. Bob Broadhurst told photographers at an NUJ conference that he had no faith in the National Press Card (a form of press pass) despite journalists needing to prove that they are bona-fide newsgatherers to an independent authority before they are issued.

The BBC TV series Panorama produced an episode entitled "What ever happened to people power?" in July 2009 which discussed the use of FITs in targeting activists and journalists.

== Similar police units ==
Greater Manchester Police operate a Video Intelligence Unit, whose plainclothes officers confront and video certain freed prisoners as they leave prison after serving their sentences. They also record footage of people involved in anti-social behaviour on the streets. The aim is to give other police officers up to date information on the appearance of people who have broken the law. Video footage thus collected is constantly replayed on TV screens in rooms where officers complete their paperwork. Footage that they have recorded has also been uploaded onto YouTube in an attempt to catch people they believe have reoffended. This has resulted in several offenders being sent back to prison after breaching licence conditions. Since the unit was launched in 2006 more than 900 people have been filmed by the unit. Not all of these people are suspects in crime however, people can be filmed if they are thought to associate with prolific offenders or if they have been stopped in an area of high crime under suspicious circumstances. Kieran Walsh, a civil liberties lawyer, said the unit's work "could have implications" for the force under Article 8 of the European Convention on Human Rights - the right to privacy. He believes that filming must be a "proportionate and reasonable" response to a crime and that this does not appear to be the case as people are being targeted over what they might do in the future. It is uncertain as to how long data collected by the unit is to be kept but GMP currently anticipate it will be stored for five years.

== See also ==
- Police intelligence
- COINTELPRO – a project by the FBI which investigated and disrupted dissident political organizations within the United States
