= Fully automated luxury communism =

Fully automated luxury communism may refer to:

- The term popularised by the British journalist Aaron Bastani
- Fully Automated Luxury Communism, a 2019 book by Bastani
- Post-scarcity economy, an organisation of society in which most goods are available to all
