= Anvato =

Technology firm acquired by Google

Anvato, Inc.
- Industry: Online video streaming, monetization and distribution
- Founded: 2007
- Founder: Alper Turgut
- Fate: Acquired by Google
- Headquarters: Mountain View, CA, US
- Parent: Alphabet Inc.
- Website: www.anvato.com

Anvato was a Mountain View, California-based technology firm. Founded in 2007 by Alper Turgut, it is a provider of cloud computing technologies for the online video industry, including online video streaming, video editing, publishing, and monetization infrastructure.

Anvato was a pioneer in cloud-based video processing. Anvato developed one of the first server-side dynamic video ad insertion technologies and received a Technology and Engineering Emmy Award with its customer NBCU. The technology allowed media companies to release ad-supported video content across all device platforms, contributing to the rapid growth of online video. Anvato also developed the first software-only, cloud-native live encoder, allowing media companies to stream at large scale using cloud technologies. On July 7, 2016, Google acquired Anvato and announced that the company will be incorporated into the Google Cloud Platform suite.
