= Minority Rule (book) =

2025 book by Ash Sarkar

Minority Rule: Adventures in the Culture War
- Cover of the first edition
- Author: Ash Sarkar
- Language: English
- Subjects: Politics; Culture wars; Identity politics
- Publisher: Bloomsbury Publishing
- Publication date: 27 February 2025
- Publication place: United Kingdom
- Media type: Print (Hardcover and paperback)
- ISBN: 978-1-5266-4833-4

Minority Rule: Adventures in the Culture War is a 2025 book by British political commentator and academic Ash Sarkar. It was published in the United Kingdom on 27 February 2025.

The book examines how ruling elites exploit cultural divisions to maintain political power and addresses polarised public debates around identity politics in contemporary Britain. Sarkar, who is a senior editor at Novara Media and teaches at the Sandberg Institute in Amsterdam, uses Marxist analysis to critique what she describes as the weaponisation of culture wars by those in power. The book became an instant Sunday Times bestseller upon its release.

== Thesis ==
The central thesis of Minority Rule is that contemporary culture wars are deliberately manufactured by ruling elites to prevent unified opposition to their power. Sarkar argues that "the politics we've got are a reflection of the balance of class forces within society" and that "nothing frightens those hoarding power and wealth more than when people are able to overcome their differences and hone their anger on a single, upward target."

The book addresses what Sarkar characterises as the "increasingly polarised public debates which centre around questions of identity." She contrasts the Communist Manifesto's call to build a movement of the "immense majority" with what she describes as a "cult of victimhood" that has developed within contemporary left-wing organising spaces.

Sarkar examines how cultural divisions around race, gender, and national identity are exploited to maintain existing power structures. According to The Bookseller, she argues that focusing particularly on the period from the 2007-2008 financial crisis to the present day, the Conservative Party and the Republicans under Donald Trump have "harnessed culture wars to promote the idea that those who traditionally occupied a dominant position in society are in danger of being subjugated by those on the margins" in order to re-invent themselves as the parties of the "left behind".

== Reception ==
Minority Rule achieved commercial success, reaching the top 5 on the Sunday Times bestseller chart shortly after publication, specifically reaching number 4 on 9 March 2025.

The book received mixed reviews from political and literary publications. Writing in The Times Literary Supplement, Robert Bevan published a review examining Sarkar's arguments.

The Guardian selected Minority Rule as "A Guardian Book of the Summer 2025", describing it as delivering "its message with punch and panache ... A joy to read".

Writing in New Statesman, Finn McRedmond published a mixed review examining both Sarkar's arguments and her political evolution. While acknowledging Sarkar as "confident and articulate" and noting her critique of identity politics, McRedmond argued that her analysis "might have been radical had it been expressed by her own side in 2017. But by 2025... Sarkar's account of how the left lost its way is not original." McRedmond suggested that Sarkar's change of heart might be "a cynical attempt to capitalise on the anti-woke reactionary moment" though also acknowledging it could represent "genuine contrition and evolution." The review concluded that "the Corbynite left could have reached these conclusions years ago."

In The Irish Times, Kevin Power published a substantial positive review titled "Pick up this book and see the world clearly". Power argued that while the subtitle suggested "more 'Adventures in the Culture War'", Sarkar "has come not to wage the culture wars but to bury them" and advances "a critique that has long since been standard on the Marxist left. But it is a critique that everyone now urgently needs to hear." He praised Sarkar for "having the inestimable advantage of being right" and concluded: "Delete your accounts; pick up a book. Pick up this book. The future is at stake." Power noted that Sarkar's goal is to show "how culture, politics and unequal stakes in the economy combine to fragment, weaken and inhibit working-class power", though he criticised her prose as occasionally collapsing "into agitprop journalese".

However, the book received criticism from Baroness Claire Fox in Politics Home. While acknowledging that Sarkar "came out against her own tribe's embrace of divisive identitarian politics", Fox argued that the book "lets the left – and herself – off the hook" and described it as "a tract of despair by a defeated Corbynista". Fox criticised Sarkar's "conspiratorial thesis" that right-wing politicians manufactured culture wars, arguing this "robs ordinary people of any agency" and accused Sarkar of refusing "to take any responsibility" for the left's role in racial divisions.

Freedom published a review examining the book's arguments about how cultural divisions are exploited for political purposes.

== Editions ==
- Sarkar, Ash (27 February 2025), Minority Rule: Adventures in the Culture War (Hardcover ed.), London: Bloomsbury Publishing, ISBN 978-1-5266-4833-4
  - Sarkar, Ash (27 February 2025), Minority Rule: Adventures in the Culture War (Paperback ed.), London: Bloomsbury Publishing, ISBN 978-1-5266-4834-1

== See also ==
- Culture war
- Identity politics
- Marxist cultural analysis
- Novara Media
