= Mick Walker =

Mick Walker may refer to:

- Mick Walker (footballer, born 1945), English football player
- Mick Walker (footballer, born 1940) (1940–2025), English football player and manager
- Mick Walker (motorcycling) (1940–2012), English motorcycle racer, motorcycle dealer, and author

== See also ==
- Michael Walker (disambiguation)
- Mike Walker (disambiguation)
