= Police intelligence in the UK =

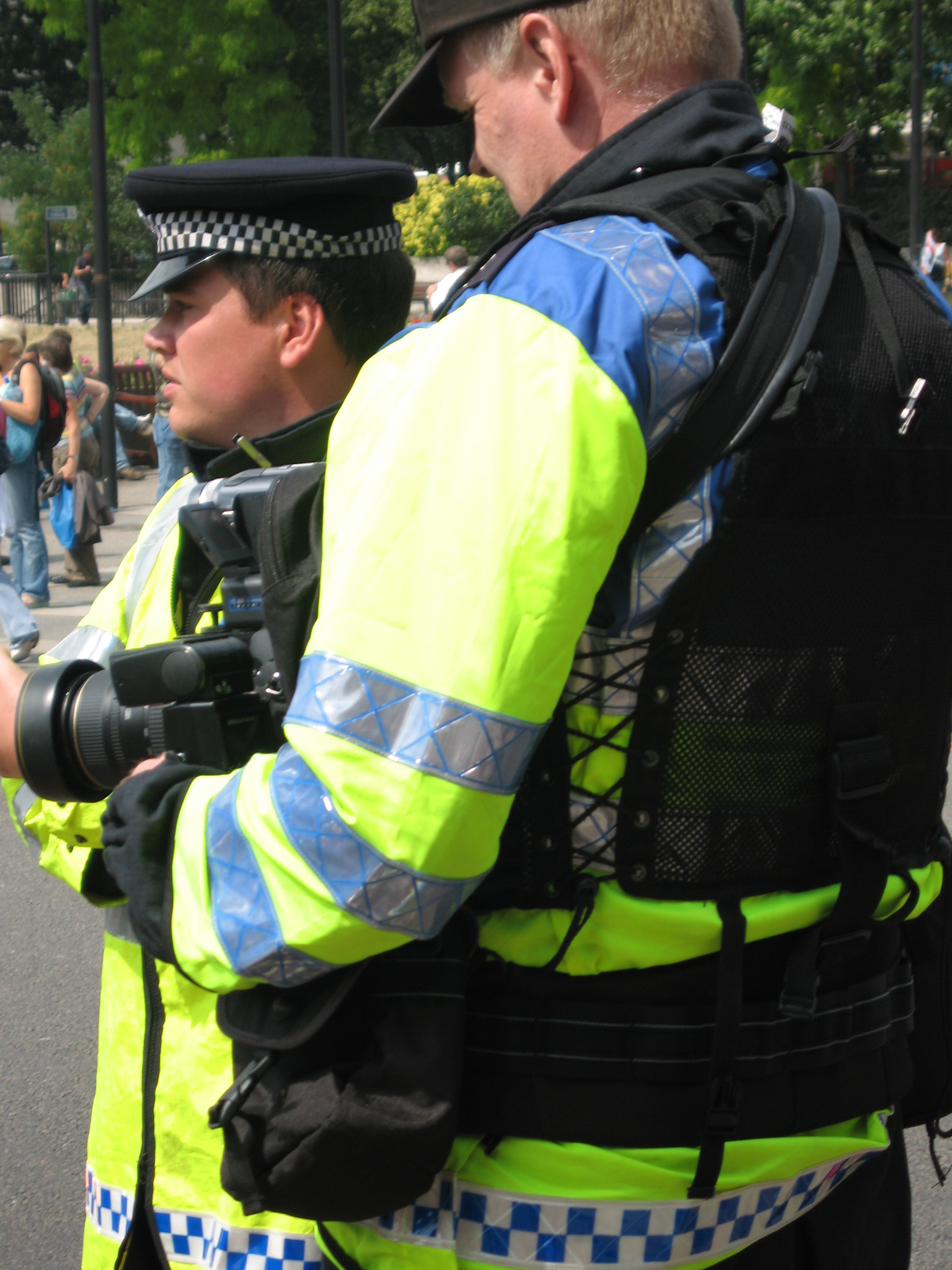
A Metropolitan Police Service photographer films a protest in London.

In the United Kingdom, police intelligence is an element of the British police whose purpose is to track and predict crime. It is an emerging discipline that gained momentum after the National Criminal Intelligence Service (NCIS) launched the National Intelligence Model, which formalised the role of intelligence in policing. Intelligence units also work at divisional level (DIU).

== Function ==
Analysts investigate who is committing crimes, how, when, where and why. They provide recommendations on ways to prevent or curb the offences. As part of this, analysts produce crime and perpetrator profiles, along with strategic and tactical assessments within the context set by the individual police force. These assessments and profiles are used to monitor and predict crime, aiming to move policing from "reactionary" investigation to "proactive" prevention. This is done at levels from local police stations, to whole counties, regions and the nation.

== Personnel ==
The heart of police intelligence is the analyst whose backgrounds range from graduates to retired officers. Most have experience in an analytical field. They are recruited directly by the force that will employ them.

== Tools ==
Data sources include the UK National DNA Database, Police National Computer, crimint, crime and witness reports, information from informants and agents, local knowledge, surveillance logs, force intelligence summaries and even newspaper reports. Intelligence Staff are responsible for developing intelligence.

IT systems include i2, bespoke police information management systems, geographical mapping tools and social mapping tools.

== Partners ==
Analysts often work and exchange information with other law enforcement agencies, including the Serious Organised Crime Agency, other police forces and MI5.

== See also ==
- British Police
- Criminal intelligence, similar concept
- Forward intelligence team, small team in the UK police
- Intelligence Branch, a personnel branch of the Canadian forces
- Intelligence-led policing, a policing model
- MI5 (Military Intelligence Section 5), or Security Service, British spy agency
- Security Branch (South Africa), a police branch, an entity of the apartheid government
- Serious Organised Crime Agency, a former British public agency
