= Mike Walker =

Mike Walker may refer to:

== Sports ==
- Mike Walker (rugby union) (1930–2014), Scottish rugby union player
- Mike Walker (English footballer) (born 1945), former English footballer
- Mike Walker (Welsh footballer) (born 1945), former Welsh footballer and manager
- Mike Walker (Canadian football) (born 1958), Canadian football player
- Mike Walker (kicker) (born 1949), American football kicker
- Mike Sims-Walker (born 1984), formerly Mike Walker, American football wide receiver
- Mike Walker (pitcher, born 1965), American baseball pitcher
- Mike Walker (pitcher, born 1966), American baseball pitcher
- Mike Walker (infielder) (born 1988), Australian baseball infielder
- Mike Walker (tennis) (born 1966), Welsh tennis player
- Mike Walker (canoeist) (born 1977), New Zealand kayaker

== Music ==
- Mike Walker (jazz guitarist) (born 1962), jazz guitar player from Salford in England
- Mike Walker (singer), country music artist, or his self-titled debut album

== Other ==
- Mike Walker (columnist) (1946–2018), gossip columnist for the National Enquirer
- Mike Walker (radio dramatist), dramatist for BBC radio
- Mike Walker (engineer) (1911–2013), designer and engineer employed with Remington Arms

== See also ==
- Michael Walker (disambiguation)
- Mick Walker (disambiguation)
- Mike Sims-Walker (born 1984), NFL wide receiver
