= Michael Walker (British journalist) =

British journalist

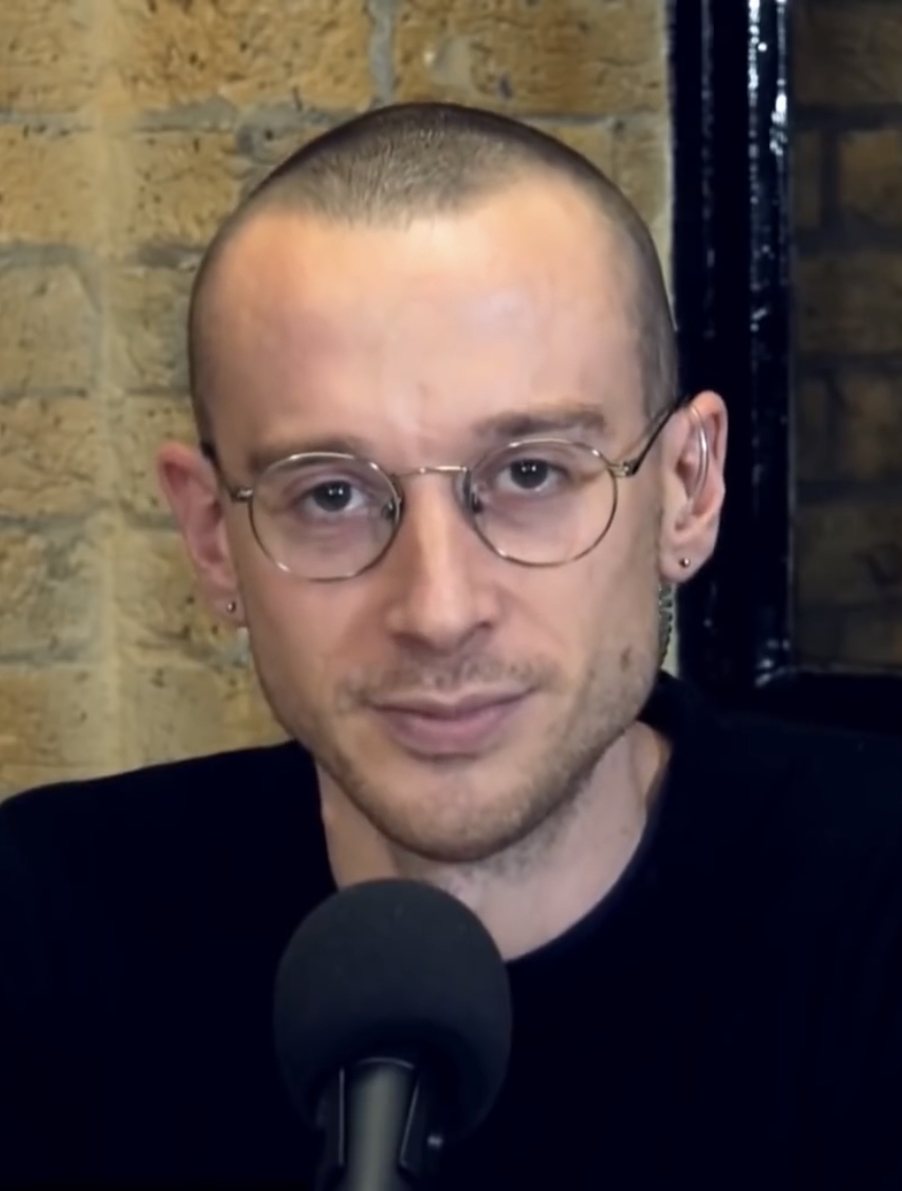
- Michael Walker presenting TyskySour in 2020
- Born: 1989/1990 (age 35–36)
- Education: London School of Economics (MSc)
- Occupations: Political commentator; Journalist
- Known for: Presenting Novara Live

Michael Walker (born 1989 or 1990) is a British political journalist, presenter, commentator, and activist. He is a contributing editor at Novara Media, where he hosts the organisation's flagship live news programme Novara Live (previously TyskySour).

== Early life and education ==
Walker was born in 1989 or 1990. Walker studied at the London School of Economics and Political Science (LSE), where he completed a Master of Science degree in political sociology.

== Career ==
Walker joined Novara Media as a presenter and contributing editor. He hosts Novara Live, the organisation's regular live-streamed news and political commentary programme on YouTube, which was previously known as TyskySour. Under Walker's hosting, Novara Live has been described by Amnesty International UK as "the most watched online daily news show in the UK". Novara Media's YouTube channel has accumulated over 534 million total views and 1.3 million subscribers.

While covering the Labour Party conference in Brighton in September 2017, Walker and another journalist from Novara Media were denied entry by Sussex Police. Reportedly refused press accreditation and barred from entering the event, Walker's exclusion was criticised by media freedom advocates including the Index on Censorship, which described it as an infringement on journalistic freedom.

Walker has also written articles for publications including the New Statesman, Jacobin, and The Independent.

Walker launched the podcast Crash Course with Michael Walker in 2022, with the first season focusing on Britain's rental crisis. The podcast, described as "A crash course into the issues essential for understanding the word today", has published 52 episodes with an average length of 43 minutes. In October 2024, Walker announced that the podcast would be taking a break until the new year, with plans for a relaunch featuring "a more consistent format and schedule".

Walker regularly appears on television news programmes and debates, including appearances on the BBC, Sky News, and Channel 5. He has appeared on GB News, including a debate with Kelvin MacKenzie in which he challenged the network's editorial stance on the Gaza war. He has also appeared on Piers Morgan's programmes, including Piers Morgan Uncensored.

== Views ==
Walker's political views have evolved over time. In a 2019 podcast interview, he explained that he had "moved away from anarchism" and now identifies as a "class war social democrat". Walker's political commentary consistently focuses on economic inequality and housing policy. He has argued that "the failure of the state to build homes is the biggest cause of the affordability crisis, not restrictive planning laws".

Walker supported Jeremy Corbyn's leadership of the Labour Party. In a 2019 appearance on BBC's This Week, Walker defended Corbyn's Brexit policy, arguing that Remainers had "struggled to get Leavers to back their campaign for a new EU referendum" and suggesting it was time Remainers "stopped blaming Corbyn for their own failings". He has written analysis defending Corbyn's electoral performance, arguing in Jacobin that "it wasn't only the media that defeated Jeremy Corbyn" but also internal party divisions.

During an appearance on GB News in October 2023, Walker questioned the exclusive labelling of Hamas as a terrorist organisation, stating: "Only if we apply the same term to the Israeli government." He argued that "there are extremists on both sides," cautioning against asymmetric moral framing. The comments prompted a fierce reaction from Kelvin MacKenzie, who denounced them as "an absolute shocker."

Following the death of academic Jason Arday in August 2026, much of the media received scrutiny regarding their coverage of him in the days and weeks leading up to it, including Novara Media. Walker expressed regret over the YouTube thumbnail used by Novara Live and said that it was "hurtful." However he did maintain that their segments where generally fact based and fair compared to the wider media.

== Recognition and nominations ==
In 2025, Walker was nominated alongside Ash Sarkar for the Amnesty International UK Media Awards' inaugural "People's Choice Award", recognising their work on Novara Live. The nomination was made by Amnesty supporters who described their work as "informative, balanced and heroic" and praised their "commitment to independent, truthful journalism". The award was established to give the public the opportunity to vote for the UK journalist they believed had made an outstanding contribution to human rights reporting over the past year.

== Personal life ==
Walker is gay. In a 2017 New Statesman profile, he described himself as an "activist first, journalist second" and a "class war social democrat".
