= Internet video =

Transmission of digital video over the internet

Internet video (also known as online video) is digital video that is distributed over the internet. Internet video exists in several formats, the most notable being MPEG-4 AVC, AVCHD, FLV, and MP4.

Watching videos has long fascinated audiences, and this interest has driven the development and advancement of video technology. From traditional television sets to personal computers, tablets and smartphones, video has evolved over time. Internet connectivity has further increased accessibility and convenience, giving rise to a wide range of online video platforms that provide streaming or downloadable content. Some of these platforms include YouTube, Netflix, Hulu and Apple TV.

There are several online video hosting services, including YouTube. Since the late 2000s, internet video platforms have been used to stream live events. As a result of the popularity of online video, notable events like the 2012 U.S. presidential debates have been streamed live on the internet. Additionally, internet video has played an important role in the music industry as a medium to watch music videos and increase exposure of songs.

== Video file formats ==
Practical online video streaming was only made possible with advances in data compression due to the impractically high bandwidth requirements of uncompressed video. Raw digital video requires a bandwidth of 168 Mbit/s for SD video, and over 1 Gbit/s for FHD video.

=== MPEG-4 AVC (Advanced Video Coding) ===
H.264/MPEG-4 AVC is the most widely used video coding format on the Internet. It was developed in 2003 by a number of organizations.

=== AVCHD (Advanced Video Coding High Definition) ===
AVCHD, or Advanced Video Coding High Definition, uses an efficient video coding format. It was announced in May 2006 and since then has grown into a high-quality video format that can compete with other professional forms of media. The AVCHD is geared towards consumer shooters; this is largely because the AVCHD format capitalizes on the H.264/MPEG-4 video that is able to compress video to smaller sizes in order to allow more video to be stored in the same storage capacity.

=== FLV (Flash Video) ===
Flash Video (FLV) is video encoded by Adobe Flash software in order to play within the Adobe Flash Player. It was popular in the past and used by several video sites, including YouTube. The Adobe Flash Player has been replaced by HTML5 and this format has been abandoned.

=== MPEG-4 Part 14 (MP4) ===
MPEG-4 is known as a sharing format for the internet. In recent years an increasing number of camcorder and cameras began employ it. Moreover, YouTube recommends using the MP4 Format (Although it accepts multiple formats, YouTube either converts them to .flv or .mp4 files). Apple is another company that has backed MP4 by using it in its QuickTime player.

== Live streaming ==
Live streaming has also been used as a means of promoting exposure for a particular product or business. This is largely because platforms such as YouTube provide a cheap, and usually free, means to access millions of users. Whether that be potential customers on laptops, smartphones, tablets, and smart TVs. A study conducted by SocialMediaExaminer supports this hypothesis using YouTube as a particular example.

== Controversies ==
Both live streaming and internet videos have faced controversy in recent years, largely because it is extremely difficult to access all the live-streams which show particular events. This infringes on the issue of copyright. Rights-holders face the challenge of content, which includes audio, TV shows and sporting events, being streamed live to the public. As a result, streaming website Justin.TV partnered with content matching service Vobile in order to filter out infringing material. Another example of a copyright issue which occurred to online streaming was when uStream were sued by a boxing promoter in August 2009 for allowing 2,337 users to view a broadcast of the fight Roy Jones Jr. vs Omar Sheika.

YouTube has also faced issues surrounding copyright. For example, in December 2013, many YouTubers who published footage of video games for either review or tutorial purposes were punished and crippled by copyright claims. In the past, YouTube has also faced issues with the music industry over users publishing videos without the permission of the music industry. The issues can be seen by the fact that since 2007, YouTube has paid out one billion dollars to copyright holders. Saying that, the formation of Vevo has aided YouTube in terms of issues with the music industry by allowing artists/labels to get a share of revenue.

== See also ==
- History of the internet
- Live streaming
  - Livestreamed news
- Over-the-top media service
- Streaming media
- Video clip (online media)
- Webcast
- YouTube
