= Memex Technology Limited =

Memex Technology Ltd
- Company type: Private
- Industry: Law Enforcement, Security, IT
- Founded: 1979
- Headquarters: East Kilbride, Scotland, UK
- Key people: David Carrick (Chairman & CEO); Graham Scott Chief Financial Officer
- Products: Intelligence analysis software
- Revenue: £5,113,497 (Y/E 2011)
- Number of employees: 110 (2013)
- Website: www.memex.com

Memex Technology Limited is a Scottish software company delivering mission-critical information systems and services for the Law Enforcement and Security markets. It is headquartered in Peel Park in East Kilbride. In July 2010 it was acquired by SAS Institute Inc. with the aim of expanding SAS' presence in the law enforcement market.

== Areas of business ==
Memex has developed a number of software databases and analysis applications used by UK and US Police Forces. Approximately 25% of the United Kingdom's Police Forces make use of Memex's software, and a number of United States federal agencies use Memex in counter-terrorism.

The company has a global presence, operating through a network of commercial partners. The United States is the country where Memex has the strongest presence outside the UK, and the company has a dedicated office in Vienna, Virginia.

== History ==
The company is named after the concept of Memex, a machine that could act as an extension to the human memory, into which vast amounts of varied information could be deposited and later retrieved.

In 1972, as technology progressed, two academics in Edinburgh set out to realise Dr. Bush's vision. Professor Fred Heath, then Professor of Electronic and Electrical Engineering at Heriot-Watt University, and Dr. Graham Woyka, designed the state diagrams and circuitry necessary to implement Bush's Memex concept.

During this process, Woyka and Heath founded the Research and Development firm Memex Group Limited.

In 1984, Memex released the first of its hardware database solutions - the Memex Intelligence Engine, which remained at the core of the company's software products for many years. In its early years, Memex experienced steady growth, primarily selling into Military markets.

The software version of the Memex Intelligence Engine was developed in 1988 and three markets emerged for the software: Law Enforcement, Defence Intelligence and Commercial Fraud.

The company was subject to a management buy-out in 2001 and merged with SAS in 2010 and became SAS Public Security.

== See also ==
- Crimint – A database system provided by Memex to the Metropolitan Police, UK
