= Novara Media =

British media organisation

- Website type: Political commentary
- Website: novaramedia.com
- Launched: 2011; 15 years ago
- Current status: Active

YouTube information
- Channel: Novara Media
- Years active: 2012–present
- Subscribers: 1.23 Million
- Views: 462.5 million
- Last updated: 30 March 2026

Novara Media (often shortened to Novara) is an independent, non-profit, left-wing media organisation based in the United Kingdom.

It was founded in 2011 by James Butler and Aaron Bastani, who met that year during the protests against the increase in UK university tuition fees. It was supportive of Jeremy Corbyn's Labour Party leadership for the latter half of the 2010s.

As of 2019, Novara Media is a trading name of Thousand Hands Ltd. It has offices in London, and another office in Leeds.

== History ==
=== Early years ===
Novara was founded in June 2011 by James Butler and Aaron Bastani. Butler was educated at the London Oratory School and at Brasenose College, Oxford, from which he graduated with a degree in English. Bastani was educated at University College London. Initially, Bastani and Butler hosted an hour-long live show and podcast, called Novara FM, on community radio station Resonance FM as a kind of 'socialist night school.' The intention was to feed into the leftist movement that had resulted in the student protests. They named the show after the Italian city Novara in Elio Petri's 1971 film The Working Class Goes to Heaven. The venture developed into Novara Media in 2013 with the involvement of others engaged in direct action in the student movement. Novara diversified and, in addition to audio, written and video content were produced, and Novara Media established itself as a multimedia project.

=== Corbyn's Labour leadership ===
At its inception, Novara Media's attitude towards the Labour Party "veered between sceptical and hostile – but certainly not hopeful". But the outlet's affinities were drawn towards the Labour Party by the interest generated by Jeremy Corbyn's 2015 bid to be the leader of the party—unlike many within Labour, Corbyn and his allies, John McDonnell and Diane Abbott, were seen by those at Novara to be allies of extra-parliamentary political movements on the left, like those in which Novara Media's team were involved. Novara supported Corbyn's leadership of the Labour Party and obtained a July 2015 interview with him on the day he became the bookmakers' favourite to win the 2015 Labour Party leadership election. A number of other interviews with Corbyn and McDonnell followed. Other guests on Novara included Labour Party Chairman Ian Lavery, Shadow Home Secretary Diane Abbott, the Green Party MP Caroline Lucas, and Chris Williamson. Novara offered varied perspectives on the 2016 EU membership referendum, with Bastani initially advocating the UK's withdrawal from the EU, and James Butler advocating a pro-remain argument. Novara later hosted multiple debates on Brexit-related issues from a left-wing viewpoint.

Following the Labour Party's better-than-expected result at the 2017 general election, Novara Media, like other independent left-wing news organisations, received growing outside media interest. In January 2018, Novara Media Ltd was dissolved by Companies House after it failed to file an overdue confirmation statement that had been due in August 2017, but it kept running. In 2018, Novara Media contributor Ash Sarkar said during a discussion on Good Morning Britain regarding protests against US President Donald Trump's visit to the UK that she had also criticised Barack Obama and the Democratic Party because she was 'literally a communist'. This clip achieved more than 6 million views on Novara's YouTube channel, and 2.7m views on Good Morning Britain's own YouTube channel, generating mainstream press coverage, which Sarkar explained dramatically elevated her fame: "‘Before, I’d maybe get recognised a couple of times per week; now it’s most places I go." Members of their leadership team were invited on to Newsnight to discuss the incident. It was also reported during 2018 that Novara staff regularly took briefings from the Labour Party via WhatsApp.

=== 2020s ===
After the end of Corbyn's leadership of Labour and Keir Starmer's victory in the 2020 leadership contest, Novara, like various other left-wing media outlets in the UK, again took a far more critical view of the party's leadership. Bastani resigned from the Labour Party in February 2021.

Novara Media saw significant expansion during the COVID-19 pandemic, with its YouTube channel seeing an increase in subscribers from 65,000 in March 2020 to 170,000 in October 2021, and in cumulative views from 10 million a month before the pandemic to 40 million by autumn 2021. Declan McDowell Naylor, a research associate at the Cardiff University School of Journalism, Media and Culture, said in 2021 that of all the media organisations he examined that have been labelled "alt-left media", he believed that Novara Media had the best chance of surviving into the long-term. He said the organisation was attempting a balancing act, as "Everyone I interviewed there was talking about professionalisation and the tensions that brings with being a political project."

Novara Media was the first to report of a leaked internal presentation given to the executive team of Avanti West Coast and its managing director Andy Mellors, which had called government subsidies "free money". The report was raised by Labour MP Ashley Dalton in the House of Commons, prompting Deputy Prime Minister Oliver Dowden to say he would look into the matter. Avanti apologised for the incident.

== Editorial position ==
Novara has a left-wing editorial position, with its associates variously identifying with democratic socialism, libertarian communism, and social democracy.

Bastani has often advocated "fully automated luxury communism", "a political vision which advocates a transition to post-work society where abundance is held in common", or as Bastani puts it, "the full automation of everything and common ownership of that which is automated". Other contributors, notably James Butler, critiqued this idea on air, arguing that the word 'luxury' could lead to misunderstandings.

Ash Sarkar, a libertarian communist, has defined communism as being "about the desire to see the coercive structures of state dismantled, while also having fun". Michael Walker has argued in favor of moderation toward "class war social democracy."

Novara dissents from what it views as biased "mainstream media". Its staff and editorial team believe traditional media outlets express a narrow view of politics and are out of touch with a segment of the UK public, have missed a shift in the UK's political mood, and have a corrupting influence on the UK's democracy. In a 2017 Guardian article, BBC Radio 4's Today programme presenter Nick Robinson said Novara Media, along with similar media organisations, were involved in a "guerrilla war" on the BBC and mainstream media as part of an attack on what they saw as the establishment. Sarkar responded that Robinson had incorrectly identified the reasons people were losing trust in mainstream media, saying that the "political classes"—including the "establishment political media"—had been trying for years to assure the public that they (i.e., the political classes) were "still responsible custodians of power, which after a disastrous intervention in the Middle East and a financial calamity people aren't feeling any more".

== Staff and contributors ==
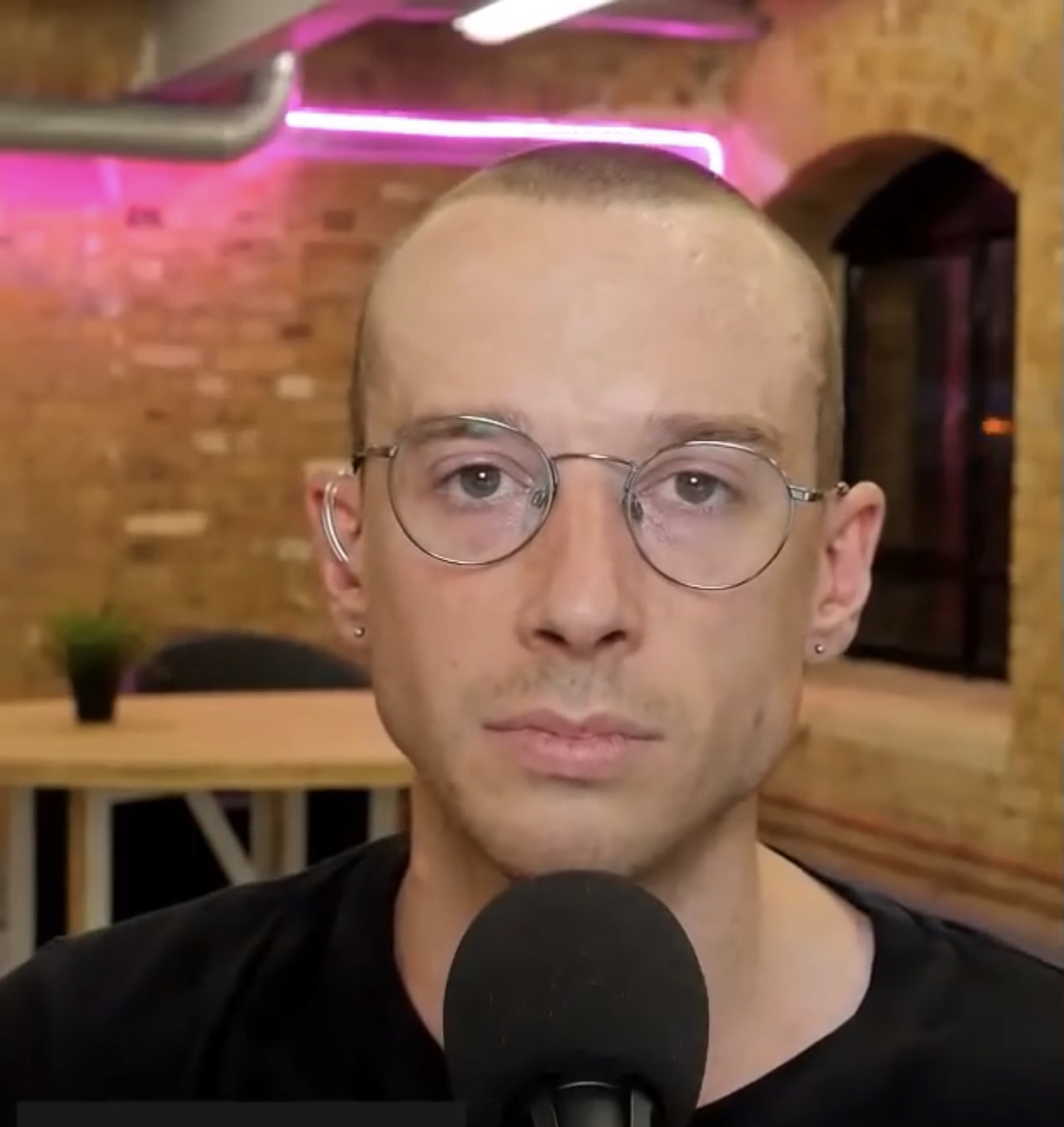
Michael Walker is the main host of NovaraLive.

In September 2017, Novara was run by a core team of 15 volunteers and had about 200 paid contributing writers. As of 2024 it employed 25 staff, including Ash Sarkar, Dalia Gebrial, Shon Faye and Rivkah Brown. Michael Walker hosts Novara Live (previously TyskySour), the network's news and political live streams broadcasting Mondays to Fridays on its YouTube channel. The writers are external to the organisation. All 25 staff in the organisation, as of 2024, are paid the same wage of £19 an hour, a £1 increase from its 2022 wages. As of 2026, staff are paid £20.50 per hour.

In August 2025, Novara Media journalist Kieran Andrieu joined the Global Sumud Flotilla aboard the Spanish-flagged Adara vessel attempting to bring aid to Gaza. The IDF intercepted the vessel at the beginning of October; Andrieu was detained, imprisoned in the Negev Desert and then deported. On Democracy Now!, Andrieu recounted numerous "torturous conditions" during this process, including a lack of clean drinking water and food and people's medications being thrown out.

== Readership and funding ==
Along with other left-wing UK media outlets founded in the early 21st century, Novara Media's growth was in part due to a lack of trust, on the part of people in the UK who identify as left-wing, in mainstream media organisations. Novara's readership is typically 18- to 30-year-olds and left-leaning people dissatisfied with more traditional news outlets.

A July 2015 interview with Jeremy Corbyn on the day he became the bookmakers' favourite to win the 2015 Labour Party leadership election attracted 60,000 views in its week of publication. Novara's self-reported site traffic statistics for the period of the 2015 UK general election were "modest": their election liveblog attracting 5,500 readers and their most popular election-related article 3,700 readers. This increased during the 2017 general election; the Novara website received a quarter of a million hits, their videos on Facebook received 2.3 million views, and on the day of the election Novara reached 1.2 million people via Facebook. By September 2017, the organisation's YouTube videos were frequently gaining 100,000 views, and, according to its self-reported figures, it had reached 3 million Facebook users over the 2017 election period. Its YouTube watchtime on doubled in 2023, with its subscribers on the platform increasing by 300% to 666,000 and its Instagram followers tripling that year. As of 2024, its website receives about 500,000 monthly visits.

Novara Media does not use paywalls and is instead funded by donations; in July 2022 it hit 10,000 monthly donors following a fundraising drive that May. It was reported to have approached 15,000 monthly donors in January 2024.

== Responses and criticism ==
In 2015, the Institute for Public Policy Research called Novara Media "innovative" within a "narrowed ... media landscape" that needed further reform as part of the UK's "architecture of democracy" to ensure "that all voices are heard in the political system".

=== 2018 poppy appeal ===
Bastani attracted controversy in November 2018 for his position on the poppy appeal, an annual fundraising campaign run by the Royal British Legion for veterans of the British armed forces. In an episode of Novara Media podcast "The Bastani Factor", Bastani described the poppy appeal as having a "racist" and "white supremacist" feel because, in his opinion, the appeal "has a kind of triumphalist militarism to it". The comments attracted widespread criticism in the national media, including from the Labour Party's Shadow Defence Secretary, Nia Griffith, who suggested Bastani should be expelled from the Party.

=== 2021 YouTube termination ===
On 26 October 2021, Novara Media's YouTube channel was terminated without explanation, and Novara called on YouTube to reinstate it. YouTube initially claimed that Novara had violated the platform's community standards without specifying the offences. On 29 October, the social media platform reinstated Novara's channel and apologised, saying that it had made the "wrong call" after a member of the public incorrectly flagged the channel for spam. In response, advocacy group Big Brother Watch, Chief executive Ed Proctor of the Independent Monitor for the Press, and Novara contributor Ash Sarkar criticised YouTube for online censorship. The columnist Brendan O'Neill opined that Novara Media "fell victim to the cancel culture the radical left fuels and too often supports". O'Neill and James Bloodworth of the New Statesman wrote that in 2020, Gary McQuiggin, Novara's head of video, defended Twitter's right as a private company to remove accounts.

=== 2024 libel apology and settlement ===
In April 2024, Novara posted a video stating that Gary Lubner, one of the Labour Party's top donors, supported the Israeli government and had profited from South Africa's apartheid rule. In September, Novara removed the video, saying its claims were defamatory and that they had failed in their duties by publishing the clip. Novara disclosed they had made charitable donations to the World Central Kitchen organisation and the Community Security Trust in the donor's name.
