= Marc Vallée =

British photographer (born 1968)

Marc Vallée (born 1968) is a British documentary photographer who has photographed youth culture, in Paris, Berlin, and London where he lives. He has made work about the tension between public and private space in the context of graffiti, skateboarding and queer cultures. Vallée has self-published many zines and shown in group exhibitions at the Museum of London and Somerset House.

== Early life and education ==
Vallée was raised in West London.

From the late 1980s, he worked as a layout artist and typesetter for Militant, the newspaper of Militant tendency, for five years.

He enrolled in art school as a painter in the early 1990s, graduating with a BA in Fine Art in 1997, and a MA in Art, Design and Visual Culture in 1999, both from the Sir John Cass School of Art, Architecture and Design in London.

== Life and work ==
=== Photojournalism ===
In the 2000s, Vallée worked as a photojournalist at protests, mainly in London, and worked on investigations for The Guardian and the Financial Times. He was badly injured by police during a demonstration in Parliament Square in October 2006.

=== Documentary zines ===
Vallée's documentary photography since 2010 has been about the tension between public and private space, in the context of youth culture in cities. He has predominantly self-published in short run, black and white, A5 zines (unless otherwise indicated).

Andrew Finch has written for Elephant:

Today, Vallée’s work predominantly focuses on the lives of people that navigate the margins of the nocturnal landscape, and those often at odds with the structured flow of neoliberal cities. His subjects are often young, male social transgressors; from graffiti writers and sex workers to activists and urban explorers, they disrupt the capitalist system while in pursuit of their own desires and identities.

A number of zines document graffiti culture. Writers (2012) looks at graffiti artists working in Leake Street, a road tunnel under Waterloo station where the practice is tolerated. Vandals and the City (2016) documents a graffiti crew in London over the course of a year. According to the British Journal of Photography, "Vallée’s photographs capture the group at work, their identities always disguised, in different locations around the capital during both day and night." "Despite having lived in London his whole life, accompanying the group encouraged him to see the capital from a new perspective, and question the ownership ascribed to different urban spaces" In the zine's foreword, Oliver Zanetti positions "the act of graffiti as a disruption of London's enslavement to the corporations of neoliberalism." The Graffiti Trucks of Paris (2017) and The Graffiti Trucks of London (2018) collect photographs of vans singled out for having been covered by graffiti in the respective cities. Down and Up in Paris (2019) shows an individual in the act of writing graffiti in various locations in the titular city at night.

He has made a few zines about queer culture. Queer (2014) "documents two years in the life of the writer Dom Lyne, at his home in Camden Town." Vallée has said that it was made as an antidote or reaction to the "homogenised gay world"; about Lyne's struggle with mental illness; and "about the importance of an alternative queer gaze". Tiergarten Transgression (2015) follows a queer anarchist exploring the gay cruising area in Berlin's Tiergarten park one afternoon. According to the British Journal of Photography, "the zine looks at landscape and space, sexuality and the act of transgression – or the act of seeking it out." Documenting Thierry (2017) is a portrait of young male sex worker and queer rights activist Thierry Schaffauser and about "the social, economic and political issues that sex workers face". The photographs were taken in Schaffauser's home in London, between 2010 and 2012. When I was at Art School in the 90s (2020; in colour) documents queer youth in the late 1990s "in their natural habitat, trying on various outfits and different styles, pretending to be lovers, in a carefree creative display", "but also something more complex. It is Vallée's response to what came before: a community slowly emerging from the horror of the 80s and early 90s global AIDS epidemic. The pictures, which were shot over one day in 1998 in an east London student house, depict an alternate vibrant world of experimentation inhabited by Vallée, Jamie, and Lloyd — all art students at the Cass School of Art opposite the Whitechapel Gallery."

Zines set in the context of skateboarding include Anti-Skateboarding Devices (2012; in colour), photographs of anti-skate devices, a form of hostile architecture; and Documenting Dylan (2013; colour and black and white) shows the life of eighteen-year-old skateboarder Dylan Leadley-Watkins from south east London.

Millbank and that Van (Café Royal, 2014) contains photojournalistic coverage of the 2010 United Kingdom student protests in London.

Number Four (2013) contains a mix of photographs taken in 2013 from the London skateboarding, photography and zine publishing scenes, including of Long Live Southbank, Dom Lyne and Dylan Leadley-Watkins. Number Six (2014) is about contemporary youth culture including photographs of skateboarders and graffiti artists Number Thirteen (2020) collects work from previous projects in London, Paris and Berlin in 2018/19.

== Publications ==
=== Zines by Vallée ===
- Writers. Self-published, 2012. Edition of 200 copies.
- Anti-Skateboarding Devices. Self-published, 2012. Edition of 50 copies.
  - Second edition. Self-published, 2014.
- Documenting Dylan. Self-published, 2013. Edition of 50 copies.
- Number Four. Self-published, 2013. Edition of 50 copies.
- Millbank and that Van. Southport: Café Royal, 2014. Edition of 150 copies.
  - Second edition. Southport: Café Royal, 2020. With a new cover and layout. Edited by Craig Atkinson. Edition of 250 copies.
- Queer. Self-published, 2014. Edition of 50 copies.
- Number Six. Self-published, 2014. Edition of 200 copies.
- Tiergarten Transgression. Self-published, 2015. Edition of 50 copies.
- Vandals and the City. Self-published, 2016. With a foreword by Oliver Zanetti. Edition of 200 copies.
- The Graffiti Trucks of Paris. Self-published, 2017. With a foreword by Oli Mould. Edition of 100 copies.
- Documenting Thierry. Self-published, 2017. With a foreword by Thierry Schaffauser. Edition of 200 copies.
- The Graffiti Trucks of London. Self-published, 2018. With a foreword by Theo Kindynis. Edition of 200 copies.
- Down and Up in Paris. Self-published, 2019. With a foreword by Rachel Segal Hamilton. Edition of 200 copies.
- Number Thirteen. Self-published, 2020. With a foreword by Alexander Clay. Edition of 200 copies.
- When I was at Art School in the 90s. Self-published, 2020. With an essay by Jamie Atherton. Edition of 200 copies.
- 90s Archive: Volume One. Self-published, 2022. Edition of 400 copies.

=== Publications with contributions by Vallée ===
- Long Live Southbank. London: Heni, 2014. ISBN 978-0-992926-80-9.
- London Nights. London: Hoxton Mini Press. 2018. ISBN 978-1-910566-34-3. With essays by Anna Sparham and poetry by Inua Ellams. Published in conjunction with an exhibition at the Museum of London.

== Group exhibitions ==
- London Nights, Museum of London, London, 2018. Included 2 prints and the Vandals and the City zine.
- No Comply: Skate Culture and Community, Somerset House, London, 2021
