= Peel Park, East Kilbride =

Business park in East Kilbride, South Lanarkshire, Scotland

Coordinates: 55°46′05″N 4°13′34″W

Peel Park is an area of East Kilbride in South Lanarkshire, Scotland. It is a business park, and home to the following companies:

== Resident companies ==
- British Energy
- LBJ
- Memex Technology Limited
- Micron Technology
- Intoto Group (formerly Mowlem Energy Services)
- Wipro
- IBM
- SEPA
- Sulzer
- Travis Perkins
- John Macdonald Group
- Alex McDougall (Mowers) Ltd.
- Soben Contract & Commercial Ltd

== Road links ==
Peel Park is the location where the Glasgow Southern Orbital (GSO) dual-carriageway which connects East Kilbride to the M77 motorway enters the town. Access from East Kilbride comes from the Queensway (A726) or from Eaglesham Road (B764).

Redwood Avenue, Drive, Crescent, Road and Place are named after the Giant Redwood (Sequoia) trees in the area.

== See also ==
- List of places in South Lanarkshire
- List of places in Scotland
