= Aaron Bastani =

British writer (born 1984)

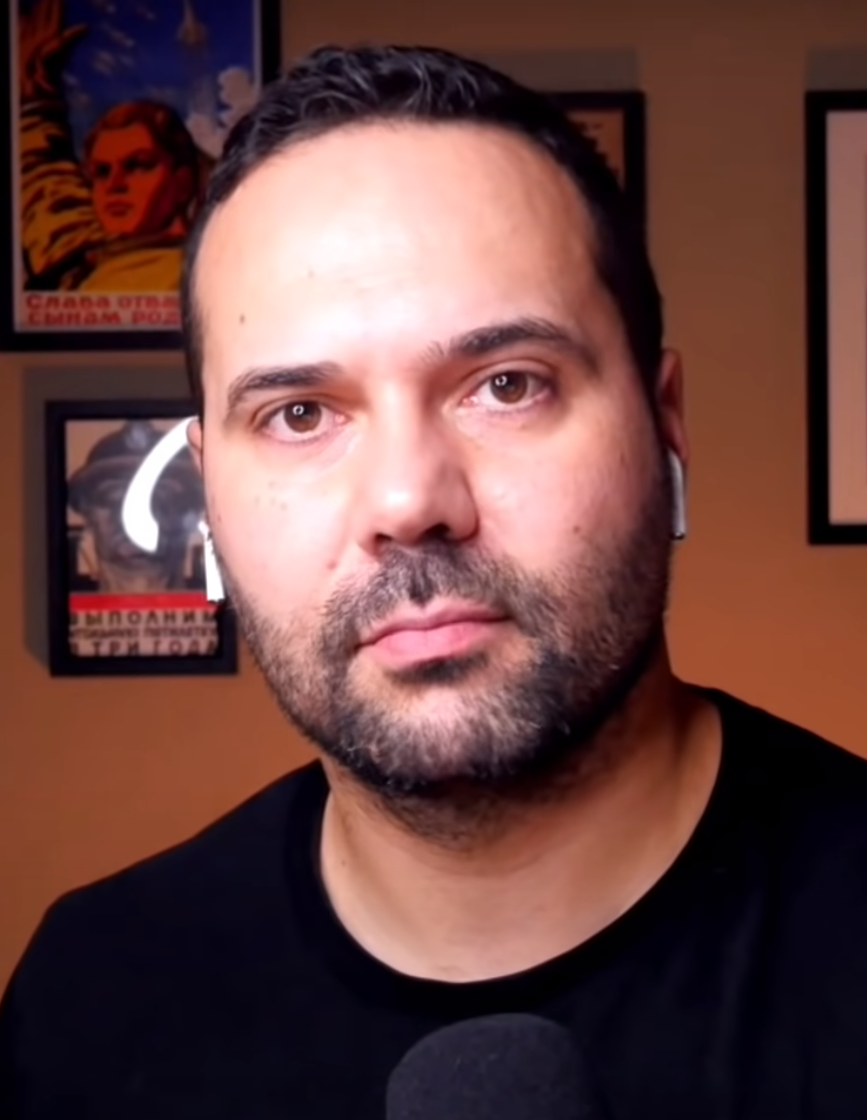
- Bastani in 2021
- Born: Aaron John Peters; 25 February 1984 (age 42); Bournemouth, Dorset, England
- Education: University College London (BA, MA); Royal Holloway, University of London (PhD)
- Occupations: Political commentator; Journalist; Author
- Known for: Co-founder of Novara Media
- Notable work: Fully Automated Luxury Communism (2019)
- Spouse: Charlotte Gerada (m. 2021)
- Children: 1

Aaron John Bastani (né Peters; born 25 February 1984) is a British political commentator, journalist and author. He co-founded the left-wing media organisation Novara Media in 2011 and regularly hosts and contributes to its Novara Live live news show on YouTube. Bastani popularised the term "Fully Automated Luxury Communism", which describes a post-capitalist society in which automation greatly reduces the amount of labour humans need to do. He authored the book Fully Automated Luxury Communism on the subject in 2019. He describes his political views as socialist.

== Early life ==
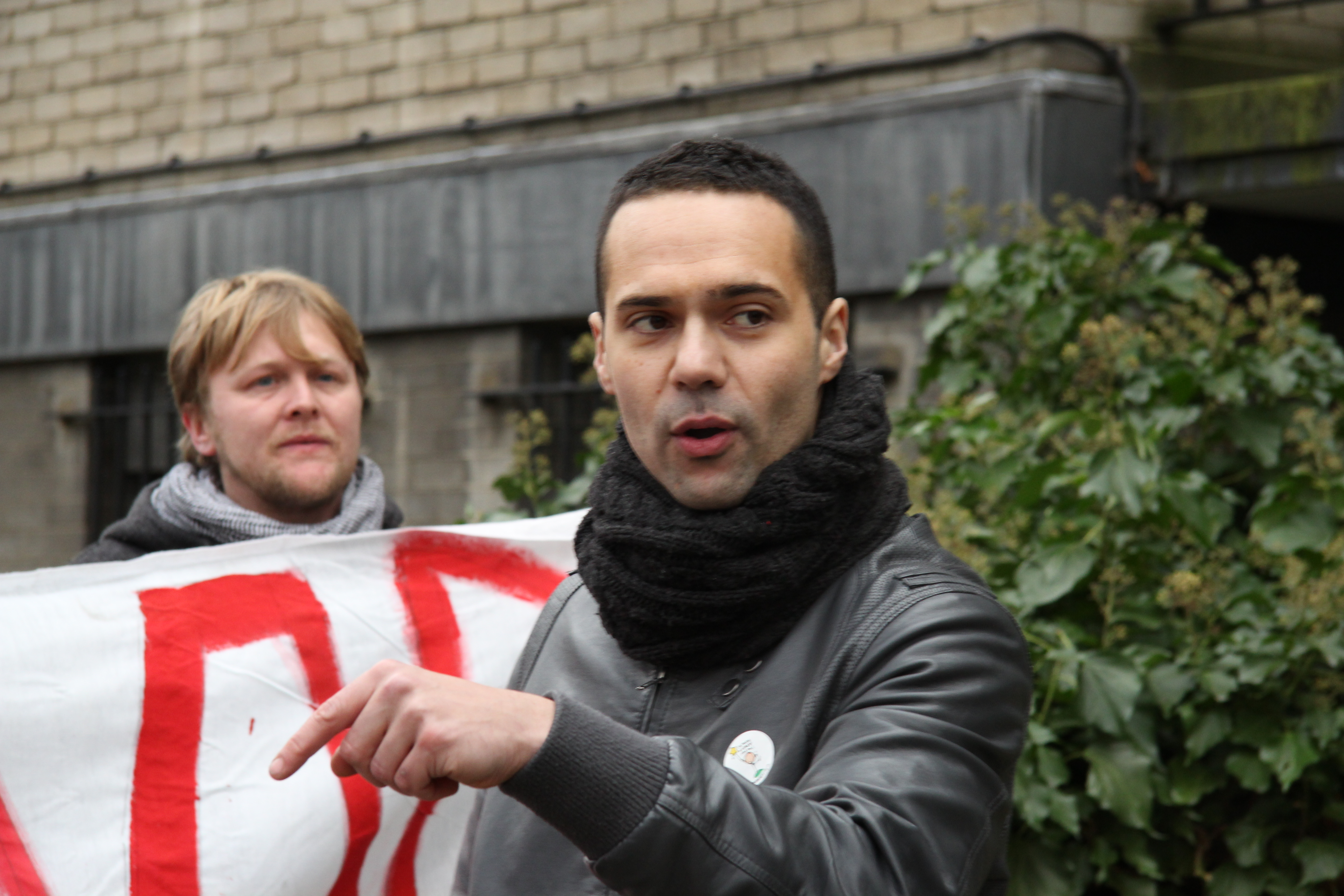
Bastani speaking at a student protest in 2010

Aaron Bastani was born as Aaron Peters in Bournemouth to a single mother, who died in 2015. She was employed in cleaning, the service industry and social care, and voted for the Conservative Party. His Iranian father, Mammad Bastani, was made a British refugee during the Iranian Revolution. He took his father's name, Bastani, in 2014.

Bastani completed an undergraduate and master's degree at the University College London. At the Royal Holloway, University of London, Bastani completed a PhD thesis titled Strike! Occupy! Retweet!: The Relationship Between Collective and Connective Action in Austerity Britain under the supervision of Andrew Chadwick. On weekends, he sold tomatoes while working on Novara Media projects. He held a significant role in the 2010 United Kingdom student protests against increased tuition fees as an activist and organiser. During protest attendances as research for his PhD, Bastani was arrested twice, leading to a six-month extension. After he used a bin to jam open an HSBC bank door at a 2011 protest, he was convicted of a public order offence and served a year's community service at Mind and as a leaf sweeper. He completed his PhD in 2015 after writing the doctoral thesis in six months; in a blog post he credited this in part to his high carbohydrate diet and his purchase of a MacBook Pro.

== Career ==
=== Novara Media ===
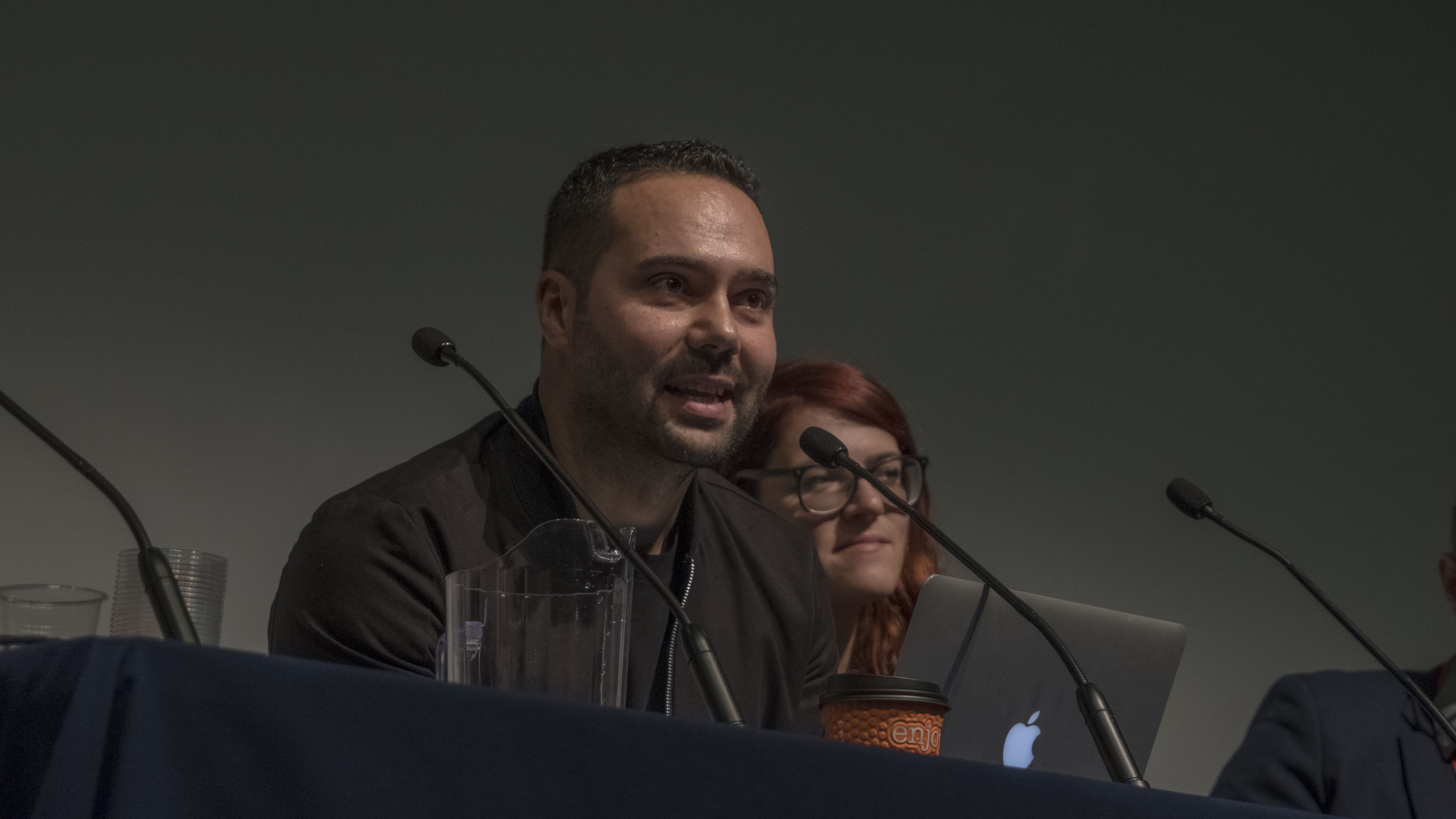
Bastani speaking at The World Transformed in 2017

In 2011, Bastani co-founded Novara Media, a left-wing news outlet, with James Butler. They were introduced to each other by Laurie Penny in the tuition fee protests. Named after the Italian city central to The Working Class Goes to Heaven, Novara Media was initially an hour-long radio programme on Resonance FM. In its early years, the organisation produced short-form media that Bastani compared to BuzzFeed, but it branched out into long-form content. It experienced an increase in popularity under the Labour Party leadership of Jeremy Corbyn, whom it was positive towards. Novara Media interviewed Corbyn and other major Corbynist figures. However, it was critical of the party under its following leader, Keir Starmer. Bastani has run video and podcast series for Novara Media including IMO Bastani and The Bastani Factor. Along with Michael Walker, Bastani has co-hosted The Fix and TyskySour. For his role in Novara Media, the New Statesman (for whom he has also written) named Bastani the 50th-most-influential British left-wing figure of 2023.

=== Fully automated luxury communism ===
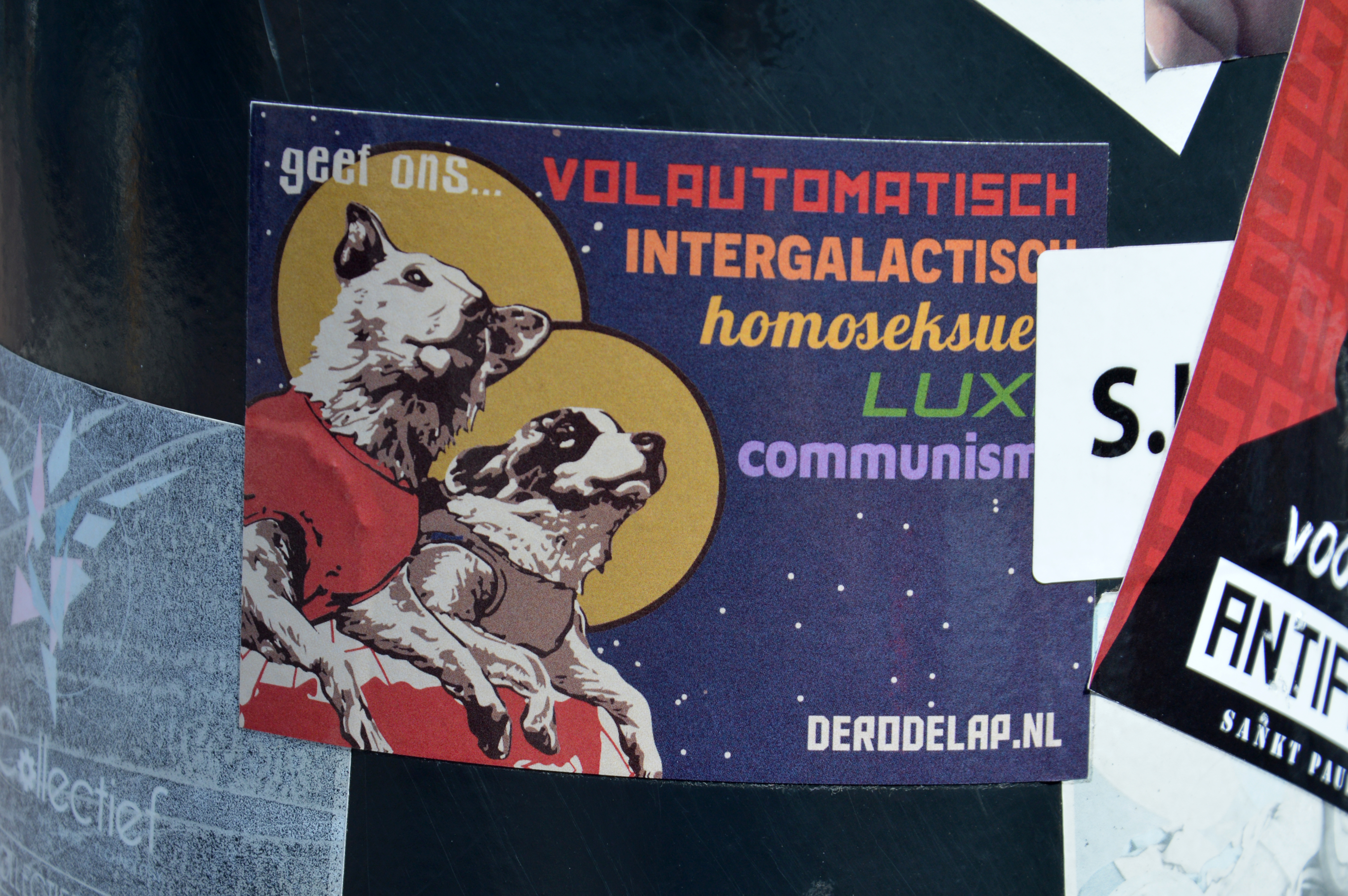
Political sticker in the Netherlands, with a variant of the term translated into Dutch (literally: "give us ... fully-automated intergalactic gay luxury communism")

Bastani has been credited with popularising the term "fully automated luxury communism" (FALC). Bastani first used it in a 2014 IMO Bastani video for Novara Media. He argued for public ownership of automation as a way to improve falling living conditions and wages, based on his views that technology would "liberate us from work" and that automation is "the path to a world of liberty, luxury and happiness—for everyone". He later said that the concept is based on Karl Marx's Das Kapital and Grundrisse, and imagines a society with decentralised control over technologies that reduce the amount of human labour required. Universal basic income (UBI) can be a short-term step towards this goal. The concept has been compared to a 1930 essay by John Maynard Keynes, Economic Possibilities for Our Grandchildren, that predicted improving technology would lead to a 15-hour working week within a century.

Thomas Hobson and Kaajal Modi criticised FALC as a misunderstanding of economics and how technology relates to social orders, saying that it assumes a gendered notion of labour and ignores ecological factors. Andy Kessler argued in The Wall Street Journal that the idea is "complete baloney" because it would "fail in real life" by missing the facts that increased living standards require higher labour productivity, and that economies are anyways shifting towards services (where human capital is the means of production). Kessler saw government actions in the COVID-19 pandemic in the United States as "a version of partly automated luxury communism", with, in his view, disastrous future consequences.

The phrase, and variant "fully automated luxury gay space communism", circulated online as a meme after Bastani's usage. In the essay Socialist Imaginaries and Queer Futures, Hobson and Modi said that the phrase originated as a "tongue-in-cheek" phrase used by "London-based lefties". Beckett said that the phrase was characteristic of Bastani, as it is "attention-grabbing" and "armoured against attack with a sparkly coating of irony". Other leftist people and groups use similar phrases, such as the communist group Plan C's phrase "luxury for all".

==== Fully Automated Luxury Communism: A Manifesto ====
Bastani wrote a book named after the term, Fully Automated Luxury Communism: A Manifesto, published in 2019 by Verso Books. In it, he conceives of a Third Disruption that would see the overthrow of capitalism and effective use of solar power for energy and mineral-rich asteroids for resources. Bastani opposes capitalism for creating short-term incentives that lead to artificial shortages. With technological advancement, UBI and free public services could be achieved in an environmentally sustainable manner.

=== Columnist ===
Bastani regularly writes articles for UnHerd.

== Critical views ==
The Quietus commented that he is known for "regularly engaging in Twitter jousts", and regularly attracts controversy over his views. In 2017, he tweeted a false claim about Labour's membership figures increasing by 150,000 that was widely repeated; Sam Bright of the BBC suggested that the information could have originated from a typo by Richard Burgon, who tweeted the same claim shortly after Bastani. After criticising the Remembrance poppy and Royal British Legion in 2018, saying the Poppy Appeal was "grotesque", "racist" and "white supremacist", Bastani was criticised in The Sun and by Labour MPs Tom Watson and Nia Griffith.

Andy Beckett of The Guardian described Bastani in 2019 as "an effective but slippery broadcaster and online presence: always fluent and flexible, able to switch from fierce defence of Corbynism to cheekier updates on the busy British left's latest preoccupations". The Labour MP Jon Cruddas criticised Bastani, among other left-wing figures, in his 2021 book The Dignity of Labour, for prioritising an educated cosmopolitan youth over "workers". Prospect's Andrew Fisher found Cruddas's account of Bastani's "technological determinism" to be mistaken.

== Personal life ==
In August 2021, Bastani married Charlotte Gerada in Malta. Gerada is a Labour councillor on Portsmouth City Council who was first elected in May 2021. Bastani's daughter was born in November 2023.

Bastani's mother was Catholic and his father was a non-practising Muslim. As an adult, he was baptised, had his First Communion and was confirmed, before marrying his wife in a Catholic ceremony. He said in 2024 that he had realised over the past few years how Catholicism had influenced his political values.

In July 2023, Bastani reported being attacked by a man who shouted his name and assaulted him. Bastani, who described pacifying his aggressor, believed the violence was politically motivated.

== Bibliography ==
- Bastani, Aaron (2019). Fully Automated Luxury Communism. London: Verso Books. ISBN 9781786632654.
