= Fully Automated Luxury Communism =

2019 book by Aaron Bastani

Fully Automated Luxury Communism: A Manifesto
- First edition
- Author: Aaron Bastani
- Language: English
- Subject: Politics; socialism; technology
- Genre: Non-fiction
- Publisher: Verso Books
- Publication date: 11 June 2019
- Publication place: United Kingdom
- Pages: 288
- ISBN: 978-1-78663-262-3
- OCLC: 1190904825

Fully Automated Luxury Communism: A Manifesto is a book by Aaron Bastani first published by Verso Books in 2019. It outlines a vision of a post-scarcity, post-capitalist society driven by technological advances such as automation, artificial intelligence, and synthetic biology.

Drawing on trends in energy, labour, and production, Bastani argues that these developments could eliminate scarcity and enable a future defined by abundance, reduced working hours, and universal access to luxuries previously reserved for the wealthy. Positioned within the broader tradition of Marxist thought, the book seeks to reframe socialist politics for the 21st century, proposing a radical reorganisation of society based on egalitarian principles and technological progress.

== Synopsis ==
The book argues that human history can be divided into three broad periods, each characterized by substantial changes in technology: prehistory to the dawn of agriculture; agriculture to the Industrial Revolution; and the present period, characterised by the explosive spread of information technology.

Bastani suggests that the prosperity ushered in by technology is inconsistent with contemporary models of capitalism. While capitalism is organised around a logic of scarcity, the technologically-mediated prosperity he predicts is characterised by the absence of scarcity.

Bastani lists five technological drivers for his vision:

1. Full Automation: Robots, automation and artificial intelligence will eliminate the need for human labour in manufacturing, transportation, and services.
2. Limitless Power: Solar, other renewables, and battery storage achieve near-zero marginal energy costs.
3. Mining the Sky: Asteroid mining and advanced terrestrial extraction provide effectively unlimited raw materials.
4. Editing Destiny: CRISPR gene editing and synthetic biology eliminate inherited diseases and dramatically extend healthy lifespans.
5. Food without Animals: Precision fermentation and cellular agriculture produce abundant, animal-free food.

== Critical reception ==
Fully Automated Luxury Communism has garnered both praise and criticism for its ambitious vision of a post-scarcity society driven by technological advancements in artificial intelligence, automation and renewable energy sources. Supporters commended Bastani's optimistic outlook, highlighting his "infectious" utopianism and the compelling argument that automation and renewable energy could lead to a world of abundance and reduced labour. Critics, however, question the feasibility of his proposals, claiming a lack of detailed strategies for achieving such a transformation and concerns over the environmental implications of continued technological expansion. Additionally, some reviewers note that Bastani's reliance on a linear historical narrative may oversimplify complex socio-economic dynamics.

Andy Beckett of The Guardian described it as "a short, dizzyingly confident book" that leaves readers either "exhilarated and energised" or "utterly baffled". While Beckett acknowledged Bastani's "faith in technology" and "guilt-free enthusiasm for material goods," he also noted that the book's predictions are based on a "broad-brush reading of history."

Ville Kellokumpu argues in Society & Space that the work fails to account sufficiently for the impact of climate change and the dependence of contemporary industry on fossil fuels. Jason Barker agrees in his review for the Los Angeles Review of Books, commenting that ecological destruction appears to be the consistent result of past technological transitions and that, in this respect, it is likely that the future will resemble the past.

Mark Featherstone, writing for Theory, Culture & Society, acknowledged the book's "utopian ambition" and its attempt to envision a society beyond capitalist realism. Nonetheless, he criticized Bastani for lacking "a theory of power, class struggle, and revolution," arguing that the work is "light on a theory of social change" and fails to address how the transition to such a society would occur.

In openDemocracy, Oli Mould found the book "full of hope," highlighting its "boundless utopianism" as "infectious." He appreciated Bastani's detailed exploration of technological advancements but cautioned that embracing the vision requires "a little leap of faith from the reader".

Annie Lowrey, writing for The Atlantic, found Bastani's vision "compelling" and "useful," but critiqued his "topsy-turvy understanding of recent history and the contemporary economy," noting a failure to credit capitalism's role in poverty reduction and to address the significance of race and racism in political developments.
