= Ash Sarkar =

English writer and activist (born 1992)

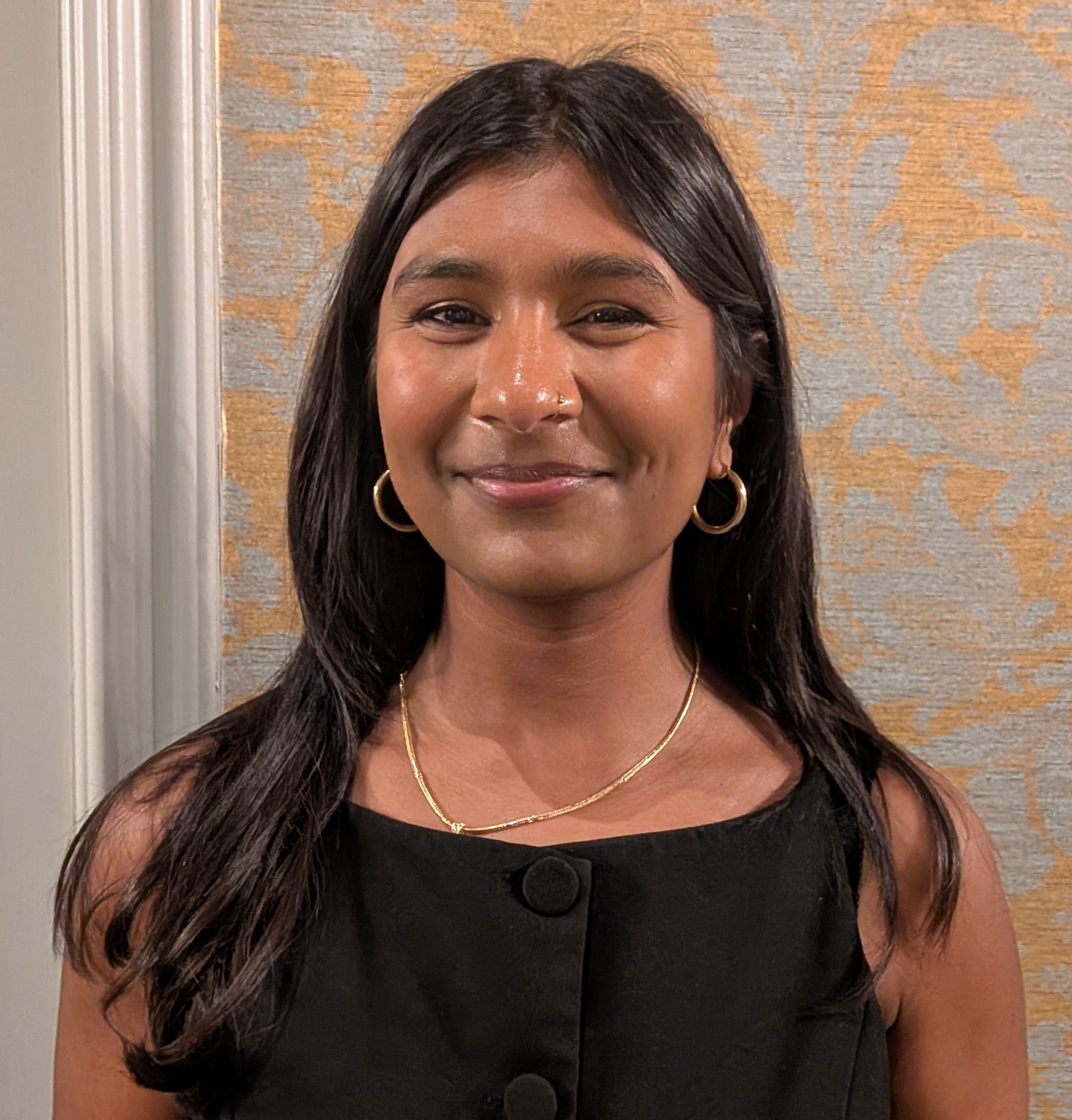
- Portrait of Sarkar at a Social Democrats event in South Mall, June 2026
- Born: Ashna Shamim Sarkar; April 1992 (age 34); London, England
- Education: The Latymer School
- Alma mater: University College London (BA, MA)
- Occupations: Journalist; academic; activist
- Political party: Labour (2019–2021)
- Relatives: Pritilata Waddedar (great-great-aunt)

Ashna Shamim Sarkar (born 1992) is an English journalist and libertarian communist political activist. She is a senior editor at Novara Media and teaches at the Sandberg Institute in Amsterdam. Sarkar is a contributor to The Guardian and The Independent, and a panelist on the BBC Radio 4 show Moral Maze.

== Early life and education ==
Ashna Shamim Sarkar was born in 1992 in London, England to Bangladeshi Muslim immigrants. Her mother is a social worker who was an anti-racist and trade union activist in the 1970s and 1980s, helping to organise marches following the racially motivated murder of Altab Ali. Sarkar has claimed that Pritilata Waddedar, the Bengali revolutionary nationalist was her great-great-aunt, who participated in an armed Indian independence movement against the British Raj in the 1930s. Regarding Waddedar's activities, she stated "I'm proud of it".

Sarkar attended Enfield County School, an all-girls comprehensive school, before moving to The Latymer School in Edmonton, a selective grammar school for sixth form education. She has both an undergraduate and a master's degree in English literature from University College London.

== Career ==
Sarkar speaking at Web Summit in Lisbon in 2026

Sarkar is a senior editor at Novara Media and teaches at the Sandberg Institute in Amsterdam. In 2017, she taught global politics at Anglia Ruskin University as an associate lecturer.

She is a contributor to The Guardian and The Independent. She has been a panelist on BBC Question Time and Any Questions?, and is a frequent panellist on the BBC Radio 4 show: Moral Maze.

Sarkar appeared in the 2019 BBC documentary series Rise of the Nazis to "illuminate the context and perspective of Ernst Thälmann, the leader of the Communist Party of Germany (KPD) from 1925 to 1933, who died in a concentration camp in 1944".

In July 2021, Bloomsbury said it would publish Sarkar's debut book, Minority Rule.

In 2023, Sarkar was ranked forty-fifth on the New Statesman's Left Power List, described by the magazine as "one of the left’s most ubiquitous commentators".

=== Publications and commentary ===
In her publications and commentary, Sarkar has expressed anti-imperialist, feminist, anti-fascist, and libertarian communist views. She has taken part in anti-racist, anti-fascist, and anti-Trump protests and in 2018 backed a hunger strike to protest against the detention of asylum seekers at Yarl's Wood Immigration Removal Centre. She supported the Stansted 15's actions against deportation flights.

After a clip of her telling Piers Morgan on Good Morning Britain that she was "a communist" went viral, Sarkar clarified her views as libertarian communist, a "long termist" who supports the former Labour Party leader Jeremy Corbyn's anti-austerity policies. Sarkar has described her view on communism as being "about the desire to see the coercive structures of state dismantled, while also having fun. It's not about driving everybody down to the same level of abjection, but making aesthetic pleasures and luxuries available to all."

After joining the Labour Party during the UK general election campaign in late 2019, Sarkar became closely associated in the media commentary on Corbyn's democratic socialist project. Sarkar announced that she had left the Labour Party in September 2021.

In September 2018, Sarkar defended anti-Zionist activist Ewa Jasiewicz, who, together with Yonatan Shapira, had painted "Free Gaza and Palestine, liberate all ghettos" onto a wall of the Warsaw Ghetto. Jasiewicz was scheduled to speak at a Momentum conference that was running alongside the official Labour conference. Sarkar wrote on Twitter that Jasiewicz and Shapira's words were anti-racist, not anti-semitic. In 2019, Sarkar said that, on reflection, she should have "drawn a line between defending Ewa, criticising the coverage and being more critical of the action itself which I don't think was well thought out".

In a 2018 interview with Teen Vogue, Sarkar described herself as being a "fierce critic" of the prison industrial complex, military industrial complex, the expanded use of drone warfare and the expansion of deportation under both Barack Obama and Donald Trump. She said the loss of jobs due to automation could give rise to fascism as a way of controlling the "surplus disposable population". Alternatively, the extra time created by automation could liberate people to "imagine different ways of living" and "pursue your passions". In an interview, Sarkar said that she voted for the Green Party in the 2024 general election.

In 2025, she released her debut book, Minority Rule. In the book and its promotion, she criticised identity politics, believing it to divide minorities and the working class.

=== Defamation and harassment case against Julie Burchill ===
On 16 March 2021, Sunday Telegraph columnist Julie Burchill was ordered to pay 'substantial damages' to Sarkar after writing posts alleging that Sarkar sympathised with fundamentalist Islam and that she "worship[ped] a paedophile" in the Islamic prophet Muhammad. Burchill also wrote a sexual poem about Sarkar, 'liked' Facebook posts saying that Sarkar should kill herself and suggested that she was a victim of female genital mutilation. Sarkar wrote in The Guardian that the abuse had affected her mental health and that she had been prescribed anti-anxiety drugs for the first time in her life. Sarkar said she had no part in the decision by the publishers Little, Brown Book Group to cancel Burchill's book contract. She also wrote: "The media's reporting of the issue ignored the defamation, racism and harassment in favour of framing me as part of the woke mob—and Burchill as its victim." An apology published by Burchill included, "I should not have sent these tweets, some of which included racist and misogynist comments regarding Ms Sarkar's appearance and her sex life" and acknowledged that it was her publisher, not Sarkar, who was responsible for the cancellation of her book deal.

== Personal life ==
Sarkar lives in North London. She is Muslim and she has said: "I pray, I meditate – it's loosey-goosey, pick'n'mix spirituality probably, if I'm being honest with myself; but for me the name I can give to it is 'Islam'." In July 2023, Sarkar married her partner with a civil partnership held in the London Borough of Hackney.
