= Oli Mould =

Human geographer and writer

Oli Mould is a British professor in human geography at Royal Holloway, University of London. His academic research, and his writing, focuses on the role of urban creativity, activism and politics.

== Work ==
In his book Urban Subversion and the Creative City (2016), Mould demonstrates a very different way of thinking about creativity than that offered by the neoliberal city, "through a variety of subversive practices, from skateboarding and parkour, to urban explorations." The book is "filled with images and global examples".

In Against Creativity (2018), he questions Richard Florida's idea of the creative class, arguing that "much of what we call 'creative' today is not creative at all but rather cementing the status quo, forever in the service of capital, labor, and consumption."

In Seven Ethics Against Capitalism (2021), "Mould sets down seven ethics which, together, can be used to attack the beast: mutualism, transmaterialism, minoritarianism, decodification, slowness, failure and love."

== Publications ==
- Urban Subversion and the Creative City. Routledge, 2016. ISBN 9781138693289.
- Against Creativity: Everything you have been told about creativity is wrong. Verso, 2018. ISBN 9781786636492.
  - Contra la creatividad. Capitalismo y domesticación del talento. Madrid: Fabeto, 2019. ISBN 978-84-94994-24-1. Spanish-language version. Translated by Pablo Hermida Lazcano.
- Seven Ethics Against Capitalism: Towards a Planetary Commons. Polity, 2021. ISBN 9781509545957.
