= Livestreamed news =

Audiovisual current events presentations relayed via the Internet

Livestreamed news refers to live videos streams of television news which are provided via streaming television or via streaming media by various television networks and television news outlets, from various countries. The majority of live news streams are produced as world news broadcasts, by major television networks, or by major news channels; however, there are some live news streams which are produced by individual local television channels as well.

A live news stream is distinct from news broadcasts that are transmitted via conventional broadcast television; since it is not transmitted via cable television services, and not via over-the-air television. These are provided through Smart TV, or else through the networks' own websites, or also possibly via internet television, especially YouTube, or via video on demand services, subscription video on demand websites such as e.g. Hulu, mobile apps, or digital media players that are designed to play streaming television, such as e.g. the Roku media player.

For some twenty-four-hour news channels, the content being shown via its streaming news service, and via its broadcast television channels, may be identical; however, for regular commercial networks, the content of the streaming news may be quite different than what is being broadcast; i.e. the broadcast channels may regularly carry standard television entertainment, while the streaming service is devoted to news only. One example of this is the American broadcaster ABC Television Network, and its streaming online ABC News Live service.

== News sources by region ==
=== North American news outlets ===
Various networks and news outlets in North America have provided official live video streams of news for most or all of the day, as described below.

- The ABC Television Network has provided a live streaming service of world news, known as "ABC News Live," for eighteen hours per day, since 2018. This is available via ABC's official platform on Hulu, as well as the network's official YouTube channel.
- In 2014, the CBS Television Network launched a live streaming news service, entitled "CBSN." This livestream is transmitted 15 hours per day. It is available via the CBS website, its official YouTube channel, various mobile apps, various TV services such as Apple TV and Amazon Fire TV.
- In May 2019, the NBC Television Network launched a livestream news service, "NBC News Now," with eight hours of news per day. It is available via the NBC website, mobile apps, and various TV services.
- The Canadian Broadcasting Corporation streams its programs through several online platforms, including its website, its official YouTube channel, its official mobile app, and several streaming television services.
- Bloomberg Television provides a livestream through its website, its official YouTube channel, and various mobile apps and streaming television services. Bloomberg Television offers some off-air news updates via social media including Facebook, and Twitter. Rebroadcasts of news and other special programs are additionally aired on the station's official YouTube channel "Bloomberg Television". On mobile devices, Bloomberg Television released an app available for the iPad. Apple TV. It is also available for free viewing on the Pluto TV streaming service.
- Yahoo! Finance has a live continuous video stream of world news. This can mainly be viewed on its official channel on YouTube.

=== European news outlets ===
Various news outlets in various European countries provide live 24/7 news streams.

- Euronews provides livestreaming of its language editions via its YouTube channels.
- Sky News, United Kingdom. In 2009, Sky News began to provide 24-hour news streaming via its website, and via its YouTube channel.
- Deutsche Welle News, Germany. In 2015, Deutsche Welle began to provide livestreaming TV news on a 24-hour basis. this is available via its website and its YouTube channel. Carsten von Nahmen, the head of DW News and Current Affairs, said that the network's goal was to compete for audiences in markets around the world, and to find relevance with audiences in Africa and Asia.
- France 24, France. In 2006, France 24 launched a 24-hour streaming world news channel in English. The video stream is currently provided via its YouTube channel, along with its French, Arabic and Spanish channels. The stated mission of the channels is to "provide a global public service and a common editorial stance".
- GB News broadcasts live through its official website and YouTube channel.

=== Asian and Middle Eastern news outlets ===
- ABS-CBN of the Philippines provides a livestream of contents from its news division (such as TV Patrol), ANC and DZMM TeleRadyo via its official portal website and its social media presence through Facebook, YouTube and TikTok as well as iWant streaming service.
- Al Jazeera provides a livestream via its own website or at its channel on YouTube. Al Jazeera English HD launched in the United Kingdom on Freeview on 26 November 2013, and began streaming in HD on YouTube in 2015.
- CCTV of China provides a livestream of world news via its website, and via its official channel on YouTube.
- CNA news channel is based in Singapore, and provides a live newstream via its official online portal, and its social media presence through Facebook, Instagram, YouTube and Twitter as well as apps for tablets and mobile devices to allow viewing at any time.
- i24NEWS is based in Israel, and provides a livestream of its services in Arabic, English and French via its website and official YouTube channel.
- Indus News of Pakistan provides an English-language livestream of world news, via its official channel on YouTube.
- NHK World-Japan provides a livestream of world news via its website and via mobile apps.
- TRT, the official national Turkish broadcaster, provides a livestream of its English-language news channel TRT World via its website, and via YouTube, since 2017.

==== Indian news outlets ====
- Republic TV, provides online streaming of world and domestic news in India.
- NDTV, has 24/7 online news on its website.
- WION provides live streaming news, via its website and via its YouTube channel.

=== Oceanian news outlets ===
- The ABC News channel, based in Australia, can be streamed online at the ABC's website and on YouTube. Its livestream on YouTube is available internationally, however its ABC iView stream is only available in Australia. Unlike other programming on iView, it is not currently offered as unmetered content by any internet service providers. The ABC News channel stream is available in medium and high bandwidth varieties on the iView site.

== History and development ==
=== European channels ===
France 24 launched on 6 December 2006, initially available online as a web stream, followed by satellite distribution a day later, covering France and the rest of Europe, the Middle East, Africa and the United States (specifically airing in New York State and the District of Columbia) using two channels: one in English and the other in French. Since April 2007, the channel has increased its reach, airing programmes in Arabic for viewers in the Maghreb, North Africa and the Middle East, and since 2017 in Spanish for viewers in Latin America.

On 19 June 2013, Sky News International was added to Apple TV for users in the UK, Ireland, and the United States. Viewers can watch clips or live streaming of the channel at no charge. On 24 July 2013, it was added to the Roku streaming player. Sky News International is available on news.sky.com to viewers around the world. On 30 September 2014, Sky News began live streaming the channel on YouTube. The free streaming service Pluto TV also offers a live feed of Sky News to American users on channel 135.

=== North American channels ===
==== CBSN ====
CBSN was created by the CBS Television Network in 2014, and was the first streaming news provided by one of the three major broadcasting networks in the United States that was streamed throughout the day, enabling viewers to watch live news coverage on connected TVs, mobile devices, and other devices.

Rumors that CBS News was preparing a 24-hour online news service were first reported by BuzzFeed in October 2013, and later confirmed by a CBS spokesperson who stated that the company was seeking "partners" for the service. Initial reports suggested that the service would consist of a linear, multi-platform streaming channel, featuring video content from other CBS News productions, along with other online-exclusive content; The New York Times likened the rumored format to an all-news radio station, combining pre-recorded video content with regular, live news updates. On 15 May 2014, CBS Corporation CEO Leslie Moonves confirmed in an interview with Bloomberg Television that the company was working on the service. Describing it as an "exciting alternative to cable news", he went on to say that "there is so much information that we get every day that doesn’t fit into a 22-minute newscast at 6:30 or CBS This Morning."

In October 2014, Capital New York reported that CBS had recently filed for trademarks on the name CBSN as a potential name for the service. It also reported that the content would take place in an informal newsroom setting, and that its interface would consist of a video player with a playlist on a sidebar, and feature social network integration. On 5 November 2014, during a Re/code conference in Dublin, CBS Interactive President Jim Lanzone announced that the service would officially launch on 6 November 2014. CBS News President David Rhodes explained that CBSN was not designed to compete directly with traditional pay-television news outlets, but to "create something that is native for connected devices", such as smartphones, tablets, and digital media players.

There was also an emphasis placed on targeting younger viewers, particularly those who are in places with little or no access to television, or those who do not subscribe to pay television at all. As opposed to CNNGo, a similarly-formatted TV Everywhere service introduced by CNN prior to the launch of CBSN, CBSN is available at no charge and does not require users to authenticate with a subscription to a pay television provider. Rhodes argued that requiring authentication would hamper the service's viewership. CBSN uses commercial breaks similar to a conventional television channel; Amazon.com and Microsoft were among the service's initial advertisers.

== See also ==
- Television news
- Live stream
- Video streaming
- Streaming media
- Streaming television
- Content delivery network
- Digital television
- Interactive television
- Internet radio
- Home theatre PC
- Push technology
- Smart TV
- Multicast
- P2PTV
- Protection of Broadcasts and Broadcasting Organizations Treaty

=== Specific platforms ===
- Comparison of digital media players
- Comparison of streaming media systems
- Comparison of video hosting services
- List of free television software
- List of online video platforms
- List of smart TV platforms
- List of streaming media systems
