= Crimint =

Criminal intelligence database run by the London Metropolitan Police

CrimInt is a database run by the Metropolitan Police Service of Greater London which stores information on criminals, suspected criminals and protesters. It was created in 1994 and supplied by Memex Technology Limited based on their 'Patriarch' technology. It supports the recording and searching of items of intelligence by both police officers and back office staff. As of 2005 it contained seven million information reports and 250,000 intelligence records.

People are able to request their information from the database under data protection laws. Requests have shown that the database holds large amounts of information on protesters who have not committed any crimes which is to be expected as the database is an intelligence database, not a crime recording system. Information is stored for at least seven years. Holding information on people who have never committed any offence may be against people's human rights. A police officer, Amerdeep Johal, allegedly used the database to contact sex offenders and threatened to disclose information about them from the database unless they paid him thousands of pounds.

== See also ==
- Police National Computer
- United Kingdom National DNA Database
- National Ballistics Intelligence Service
- Aerial roof markings
- Canadian Police Information Centre, Canadian equivalent law enforcement database
