= Mickey Walker (footballer) =

English footballer and coach (born 1945)

Personal information
- Full name: Michael John Walker Jr.
- Date of birth: 10 April 1945 (age 81)
- Place of birth: Harrogate, England
- Position: Winger

Youth career
- Sheffield Wednesday
- Rotherham United

Senior career*
Years	Team	Apps	(Gls)
1963-1964	Bourne Town	28	(7)
1964–1966	Bradford City	20	(1)
1966	Rotherham United	0	(0)
1966–1968	Sligo Rovers		
1968	Los Angeles Wolves	22	(7)
1968–1969	Mansfield Town	2	(0)
1969–1970	Altrincham		
1970–1971	Stockport County	2	(0)
1970–1971	Chesterfield	1	(0)
- Macclesfield Town
Total		75	(15)

Managerial career
- Nottingham Forest (Assistant Manager)
- 1999–2006: Doncaster Rovers (Assistant Manager)
- 2006–2012: Doncaster Rovers (Director of Football)
- 2006: Doncaster Rovers (Caretaker Manager)
- * Club domestic league appearances and goals

Michael John Walker Jr. (born 10 April 1945) is an English former professional footballer and coach.

== Early and personal life ==
Walker was born in Harrogate, and grew up in Doncaster. His father Mickey Sr. had played for Doncaster Rovers, Bradford City, Bradford Park Avenue and York City. As a teenager he played cricket, trialling for Yorkshire Schoolboys at the age of 15, and later playing for England Schoolboys.

He is married to Carol.

== Career ==
=== Playing career ===
After being told he was too short (at 5 ft 7) to play football by Doncaster Rovers, Walker played youth football with Sheffield Wednesday and Rotherham United. After a spell in non-league football with Bourne Town, he turned professional with Bradford City in October 1964. He made 20 appearances in the Football League (scoring 1 goal) for Bradford City, before returning to Rotherham United in March 1966. He then moved to Sligo Rovers in Ireland later in 1966.

He spent the 1968 season with the Los Angeles Wolves of the North American Soccer League, scoring 7 goals in 22 games.

He later played for Mansfield Town, Altrincham, Stockport County, Chesterfield and Macclesfield Town.

=== Coaching career ===
Walker worked as a scout for Liverpool and Rangers, and as a youth team coach at Leeds United and Nottingham Forest. After leaving his role as Assistant Manager at Nottingham Forest, Walker has held a number of positions at Doncaster Rovers, including Assistant Manager, Director of Football, and Caretaker Manager. He was Director of Football at Doncaster from 2006 until July 2012 when he was released as part of the club's cost cutting restructuring after relegation from the Championship.

A testimonial match was held by Doncaster Rovers on 1 August 2009 in honour of Walker.

== Sources ==
- Frost, Terry (1988). Bradford City A Complete Record 1903-1988. Breedon Books Sport. ISBN 0-907969-38-0.
