= Calderwood, East Kilbride =

Neighbourhood of East Kilbride, Scotland

Coordinates: 55.7741°N 4.1630°W

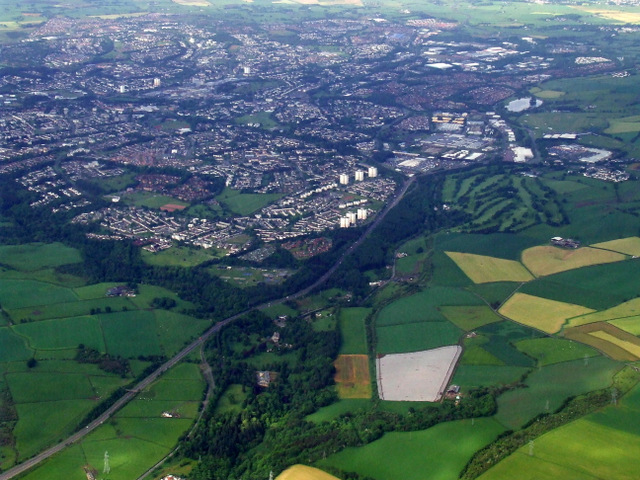
Aerial view of Calderwood from the north-east, 2012

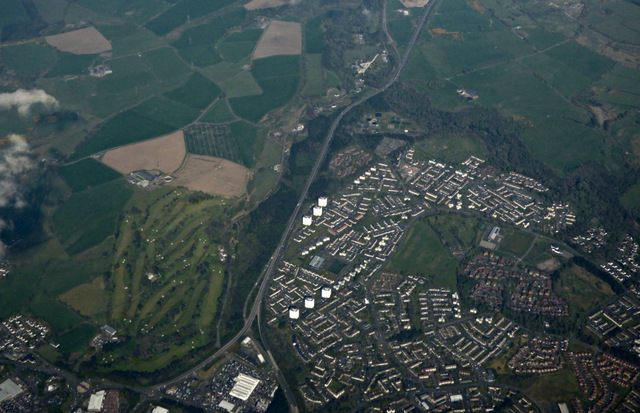
Aerial view of Calderwood from the south-west, 2017

Calderwood is a neighbourhood of the Scottish new town of East Kilbride, in South Lanarkshire. It lies in its north-eastern area and is one of the largest areas of the town.

== Location ==
Calderwood is the second-oldest planned neighbourhood in East Kilbride new town, commencing in the early 1950s, shortly after the commencement of The Murray. Most initial residents moved in from condemned housing in Glasgow. It is the town's largest residential area, forming most of the East Kilbride East multi-member electoral ward, which had a recorded overall population of 14,308 in 2019; the remainder of the neighbourhood (west of Calderwood Road, east of the Kingsway dual carriageway bypass, including Maxwellton) is in the East Kilbride Central North ward. The one directly neighbouring residential area is St Leonards neighbourhood to the south. Calderwood is divided from the East Mains and Village areas to the west by the Kingsway bypass – there are no direct road-traffic links from this, only two underpasses beneath the road and a footbridge over it.

== Boundaries ==
The neighbourhood does not have a traditionally signposted or walled boundary and is simply joined to adjacent residential areas and main roads that form other parts of the early new town. The area is bounded on the north by the A725 Hamilton to East Kilbride Expressway; on the west by the Kingsway; and on the northeast by Calderwood Glen (part of Calderglen Country Park) as far south as the residential streets of Ellisland and Nithsdale. The southern and south-eastern parts of boundary are significantly more convoluted: beginning at the Whitemoss Roundabout, it follows a short part of Calderwood Road before turning east to follow a segregated pedestrian link path south of Deveron Road and Almond Drive. Thence it runs northwards, west of Glen Farrar, bisects Ness Drive, and then follows the boundary of a wooded belt past Glen Cally before turning to incorporate part of the street of Hazelhead, inclusive of its play area. It then follows the western boundary of Glen Clova as far north as the back boundary of the newer 21st century housing developments. Thence it runs a significant distance eastwards, following a pedestrian back path to meet Morrishall Road. There the boundary runs northwards along the said road before turning eastwards to follow the entire length of Glen Esk, then northwards along St Leonards Road as far as the woodland strip of the Woodhead Burn, which separates the Calderwood streets of Nithsdale and Ellisland from those of Glen Quoich and Glen Derry in St Leonards. St. Leonards Church and School, although falling within the Calderwood Neighbourhood boundary, owe their namesakes to the revived R. C. parish jurisdiction of St Leonards rather than their modern geographical location. It is commonplace to find the casual assumption that most or even all streets south of St Leonards Road, as far east as the boundary of Glen Farrar, are in St. Leonards. Technically, part of Yarrow Park is also in Calderwood, but fell off the jurisdictional radar at an early date as neighbouring developments of the St Leonards neighbourhood encroached upon it.

== History ==
The neighbourhood takes its name from the historic Calderwood Estate, whose former lands the neighbourhood mostly occupies. This name in turn derives from an ancient reference to the once extensive woodland adjoining the gorge of the Rotten Calder Water to the east.

The area includes Hunter House Museum at Long Calderwood Farmhouse, once the home of the 18th-century medical and zoological pioneers William and John, who were famous anatomists. In 2011 the museum building was bought by the neighbouring Calderwood Baptist Church and converted into the "Hunter House Cafe", a space for the community and church use. The building and estate had belonged to the Hunter family since the early 18th century, when the family relocated there from their other holding of Calderfield, now occupied by part of Maxwellton village. The extant buildings, inclusive of Long Calderwood Row down the hill, date variously from the mid 17th to mid 19th centuries, with a 20th-century extension from the building's time as a museum.

The area adjoins Calderwood Glen along its eastern fringe, which forms the northern section of Calderglen Country Park. The glen was widely praised as a Picturesque and Romantic attraction in the 18th and 19th centuries, and by the early 1900s wa recognised as a renowned beauty spot in the West of Scotland. Calderwood Castle, finally demolished by the Royal Engineers in 1951 after more than a decade of ruination, was home for nearly five centuries to the Maxwells of Calderwood, including Sir James, second husband of Lady Margaret Cunningham, the memoirist and correspondent. Scenes in Calderwood Glen were sketched by the 18th-century landscape artist Paul Sandby, and the area visited several times by British and foreign aristocracy, including Princess Mary Adelaide and the Crown Prince of Denmark. A pen and wash drawing by Paul Sandby showing Calderwood Linn - a waterfall currently known colloquially as Castle Falls - was discovered in April 2015 by topographical historian Chris Ladds. Alongside its sister sketch of Calderwood Castle, the wash drawing of the linn represents the earliest known view of Calderwood and of East Kilbride.

Most of the rocky defile of Calderwood Glen forms a Site of Special Scientific Interest (SSSI) for palaeontology and geology, designated on 1 August 1990. It is also known for its endemic and often scarce species of wildflowers, mosses, liverworts and fungi in pockets of natural and semi-natural ancient woodland. These areas once formed parts of the more extensive primeval woodland of Central Scotland. Calderwood Glen was noted for scarce flora by botanists surveying the region, including Roger Hennedy, Hooker, Hopkirk, John Lee, the Rev. William Patrick, and the early palaeontologist Ure. The findings of these botanists were added to in an edited regional flora survey published posthumously in 2016 by P. Macpherson.

=== Maxwellton Conservation Area ===
The 18th–19th-century weaving village of Maxwellton survives in the western part of the Calderwood neighbourhood. Once a rural community, it was the main area of proto-urban settlement in the Barony of the ancient Calderwood Estate, where from AD 1400 until 1885, the Maxwells of Calderwood were the main landed family. Maxwellton became prominent locally and nationally from the 1960s onwards, when a dispute broke out between residents and the East Kilbride Development Corporation, which sought to condemn the settlement as a slum and demolish it to make way for part of East Kilbride new town. The Burgh Council of East Kilbride sided with the villagers, and with backing from the National Trust For Scotland, a campaign ensued over subsequent years which saved most of the village on historic, architectural and aesthetic grounds. Maxwellton village then joined the early statutory conservation areas in Scotland, after nearby Eaglesham in 1968.

The campaign to save the village reached cabinet level in the House of Commons and gained national publicity, mostly due to the involvement of Judith Hart MP and local resident Fred S. Mitchell. Mitchell was a memoirist, topographical historian of Calderwood, and a Maxwellton resident, whose main position was on the senior reference staff of the Mitchell Library in Glasgow. After its rescue, the village began to receive backing from the same Development Corporation which was originally intent on its destruction. One result of this was the sponsorship by the Daily Express newspaper, to restore one derelict cottage – thereafter referred to locally as the Express Cottage. The Scottish Daily Express issued regular national coverage of its attempts to restore the house to fashionable conservation standards. Increased public interest in the village led over a thousand buyers bidding for the 23 run-down Maxwellton cottages. These efforts led to the Development Corporation's further publicity, to arrange an unveiling of a show cottage by the Marchioness of Bute, which received further national press coverage.

Along with a townscape of weaving cottages, Maxwellton preserves the original Calderwood Estate's endowment school, founded by Sir William Alexander Maxwell, 8th Baronet of Calderwood, in 1839. This institution was viewed as advanced for its time in providing funds, materials and facilities which offered a superior educational experience, as well as backing for educating the poor. The school received an annual endowment from the Barony of Calderwood to support pupils and teacher salaries. The advances instituted by Sir William sufficed for Maxwellton School to be cited and studied several times as an important issue in the history of education in Scotland. The school building is now a private dwelling named Alma, after the wife of a former owner. It is classed as a Category B listed building.

== Facilities ==
The Calderwood area contains the John Wright Sports Centre, named after a prominent 1960s new-town burgh provost. This was opened in 1972 and was later added to with a full-length athletics track on part of the former Whitemoss Recreation Area. Calderwood Square is the main neighbourhood centre for retail and food outlets, The neighbourhood also features smaller 'local shop' areas from two main periods of new town development. These were intended to provide nearby convenient access to daily essentials such as high-demand groceries, newspapers, and originally fresh butchery provisions. These areas still exist and are located at Lochlea by Alloway Road; Maxwellton Avenue in the heart of Maxwellton village; and at Neville. The local facilities at Lochlea were developed to also include a public house, due to the distance that residents would have travel otherwise to the nearest alternative, given the large size of an extended neighbourhood. In addition to these new town era facilities, the village of Maxwellton also includes the much older Calderwood Inn public house.

Nearby amenities include Calderwood Community Hall, also known as Blackbraes Hall, the Alison Lea Medical Centre, and the Moncreiff Church of Scotland parish church, named after a prominent 1843 Disruption minister connected with East Kilbride and Calderwood, Sir Henry Wellwood-Moncreiff, 10th Baronet. Calderwood had a branch library At Allison Lea (formerly Calderwood Square), whose building, alongside its community centre component, have since been converted into a place of worship: the East Kilbride Islamic Centre.

The neighbourhood is home to three areas of non-traditional public parks with associated landscaping: Lammermoor Park in the north-eastern corner of the area, which forms a large area of maintained grassland laid out in flower beds and planted belts, with recently added allotment and raised bed provisions; Glen Esk Urban Greenspace, which is a large area of rehabilitated landfill on the border with St Leonards neighbourhood; and Brancumhall Recreation Area, which includes grass pitches, an informal landscaped park and walkway, mini-golf course and development centre, and a bowling green, with associated pavilion and clubhouse facilities. A landscaped 'greenway' style park also runs east to west through part of the Long Calderwood area of this neighbourhood.

This category does not include small landscaped children's play areas, which are numerous.

=== Housing ===
The original housing created in the area for the new town project (each with plumbing, electricity, gardens, and dedicated bathrooms and kitchens – a noted improvement for residents used to overcrowded, crumbling inner-city slums) followed a similar pattern to other parts of the town: Individual dwellings were mainly in short terraced rows facing onto streets, or less commonly with an access road and parking area skirting the houses, accessed by footpaths and sometimes with a communal green space. Flats also feature heavily, constructed in either a traditional two or three-storey configuration as part of terraced developments, with a common close, or as standalone tenemental or modular angular blocks of three or four storeys pivoting on a central stairway. The larger flat blocks provided 9, 12 or 16 apartments, and featured individual balconies. Flat complexes grew increasingly commonplace in the mid-1960s when the neighbourhood was extended eastwards, as efforts went into meeting ambitious housebuilding targets with less space available than before. Six tower blocks of 15 storeys were built in two clusters in the northern part of the area, providing a total of 522 residences.

=== Current schools ===
Calderwood has five primary schools: Long Calderwood Primary, Maxwellton Primary, Hunter Primary, Greenburn Primary (catering to children with special needs), and St Leonards R.C. Primary. Under South Lanarkshire's Schools Modernisation Programme beginning in the mid-2000s, these were rebuilt and modernised.

Until the summer of 2007, there was a secondary school in the area named Hunter High School. As part of a modernisation programme, this was merged with the nearby Claremont High School in St Leonards to form Calderglen High School, next to the former Claremont High campus. The Hunter High building was demolished. Most of the land where Hunter High and the older Hunter Primary stood has been built over by modern housing, including Gamekeeper's Wynd.

== Notable past residents ==
- Joanna Baillie, poet and dramatist
- Matthew Baillie, physician
- John Struthers (poet)
- William and Jim Reid, musicians (The Jesus and Mary Chain)
- Ally McCoist, footballer (Rangers and Scotland)
- Julie Wilson Nimmo, actress
- William Hunter (anatomist), pioneering anatomist, physician, gynaecologist, surgeon, and collector
- John Hunter (surgeon), pioneering surgeon and zoologist
- Blythe Duff, television and theatre actress, of (Taggart) fame, was born, lived in, and attended schools in the area.
