= Hunter High School, East Kilbride =

Hunter High School
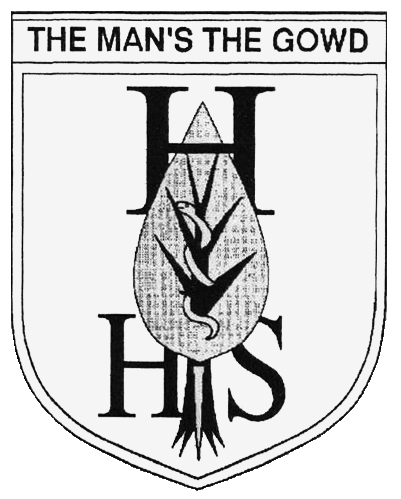
- Crawford Drive; Calderwood; East Kilbride, G74 3YD; Scotland

Information
- Motto: The crest of Hunter High School, composed of the tree of knowledge interlaced by the serpent of wisdom, with motto "The Man's the Gowd" taken from the Robert Burns song "A Man's a Man for A' That".
- Status: Closed (Demolished 2009)
- Enrollment: 696 (March 2002)
- Colours: Light blue and Gold

Hunter High School was a non-denominational secondary school which served the Calderwood, East Mains and parts of the St Leonards and Stewartfield areas of the new town of East Kilbride from 1963 to 2007. The school started as a four-year Secondary school and was extended in 1966 prior to amalgamation with the old East Kilbride Village school to form a full six-year Comprehensive. In 2008, it merged with Claremont High School to form the new Calderglen High School.

== History ==
Hunter High School takes its name from the anatomist and physician William Hunter (1718 – 1783) and his younger brother, the surgeon John Hunter (1728 – 1793) who were both born nearby at Long Calderwood.

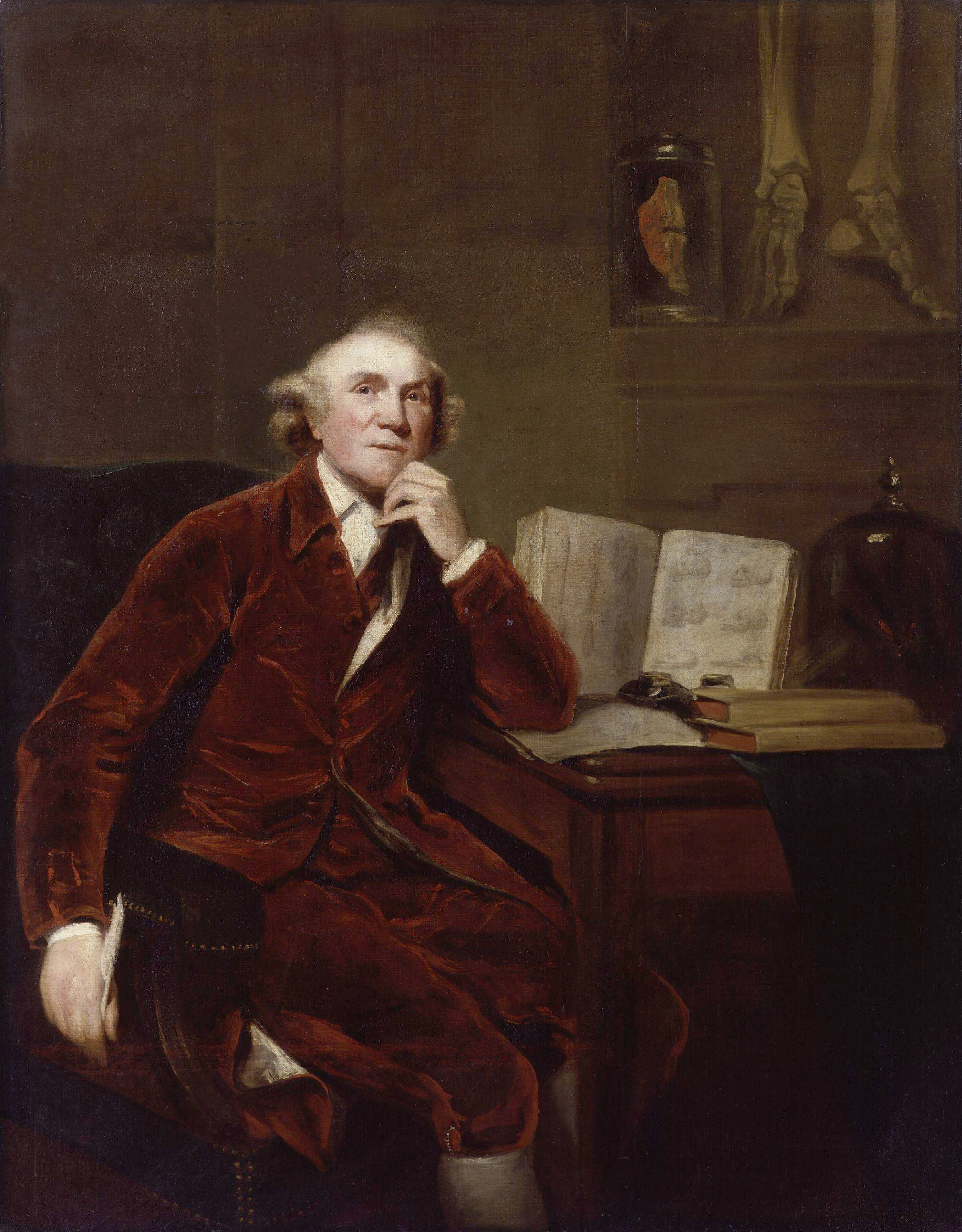
Portrait of John Hunter (Surgeon) by John Jackson (after Sir Joshua Reynolds).

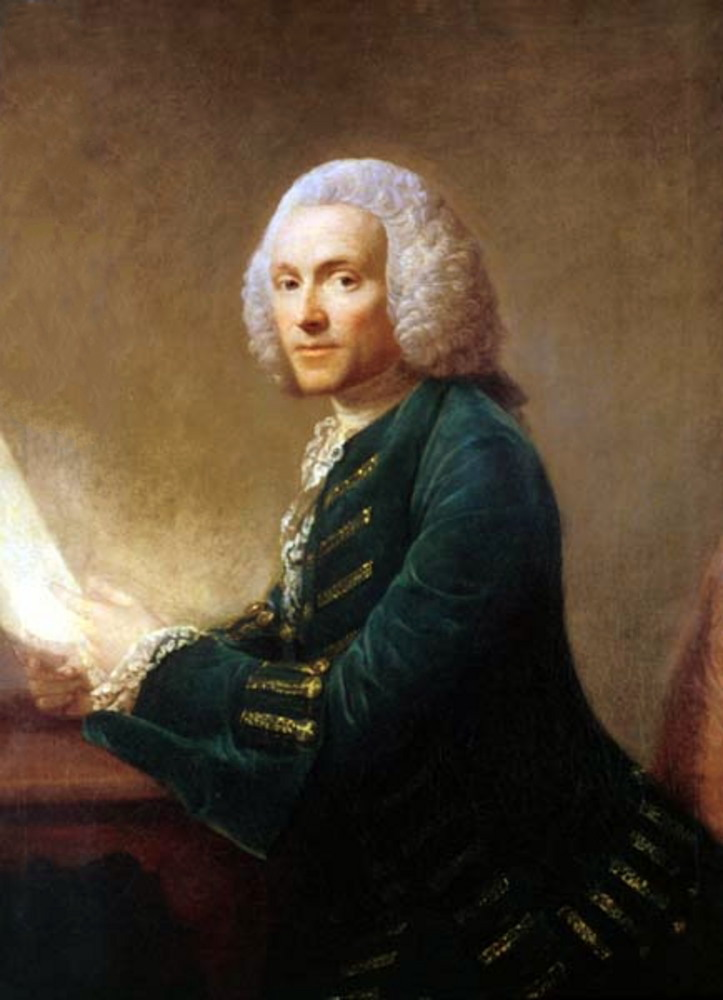
Portrait of William Hunter (Anatomist) by Allan Ramsay, 1758.

== Architecture ==
The building was designed by the Lanarkshire County architect, David Gordon Bannerman (1908–1986), and was officially opened on 16 December 1963 by John Gordon, the first-ever Provost of East Kilbride. It was the first secondary school in Lanarkshire built with specific provisions for courses leading to the "O" grade certificate.

At the opening ceremony, Provost Gordon praised the architects and builders for the fine job they had done and expressed that in his opinion the new building was already out of date because he felt that "...in the era of sputniks and moon rockets, while the school had many wonderful features, it could have been equipped with the modern closed circuit television equipment, to enable the streamlining of teaching."

By 1968, the school building had been extended to accommodate the improved Higher Learning Certificate syllabus.

== Closure ==
Hunter High was one of four former East Kilbride school sites sold to Barratt Developments by Amec, who had purchased the land from South Lanarkshire Council in 2007 as part of the local authority's schools’ modernisation programme. Due to economic uncertainty, the abandoned building fell into an advanced state of dereliction and was later demolished in September 2009. The site was later redeveloped by Barratt along with Persimmon Homes under the marketing title "Gamekeepers Wynd".

== Alumni ==
- Ally McCoist MBE, professional footballer and manager
- Blythe Duff, Actress
- Julie Wilson Nimmo, Actress
- Jim Reid, William Reid and Douglas Hart, musicians, The Jesus and Mary Chain
- Bobby Madden, Scottish Football Association and FIFA Referee
