= Rotten Calder =

River in South Lanarkshire, Scotland

Coordinates: 55°50′N 4°06′W

The Rotten Calder Water is a small river which flows along the eastern boundary of East Kilbride new town, South Lanarkshire, Scotland, and along with the Rotten Burn these watercourses form the southern and western boundaries of Blantyre parish.

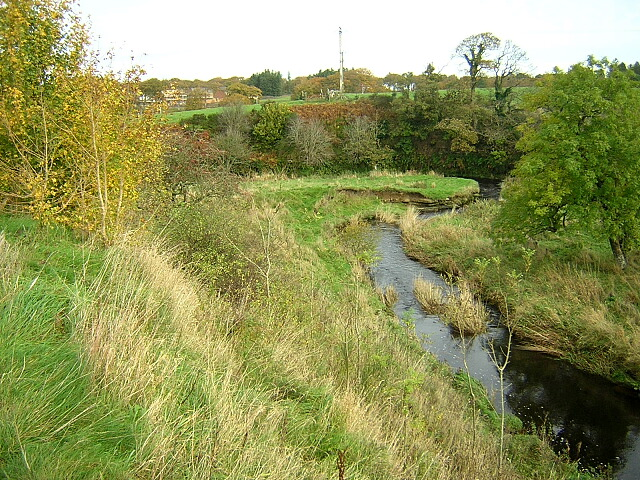
Bend on Calder Water at Langlands/Hurlawcrook

The watercourse in its upper reaches begins as the Calder Water at its true source on Ellrig hill, and is synonymous with the Cleughearn Burn or Park Burn in that district. Flowing some distance northeast, it is eventually joined by the Lea, Cladden, Linnbog, and Rutheran Burns, whose multiple confluences mostly occur in the area between Langlands Moss and Millwell. This river has also been titled the 'West' or 'South Calder Water', although the latter title is shared by another river in Motherwell. Sources using these names are very sparse, with most calling it the Calder or Rotten Calder Water. Upon being joined by the Rotten Burn by Crutherland, to the south-east of East Kilbride, the Calder Water becomes the Rotten Calder Water. 'Water' is a Scots term denoting a small river. The 'rotten' place-name element is a corruption of an old or middle Celtic term meaning red or russet, and probably refers to the strong iron oxide staining of the bed of the Rotten Burn, borne from natural ironstone deposits which create a distinguishing feature of this watercourse

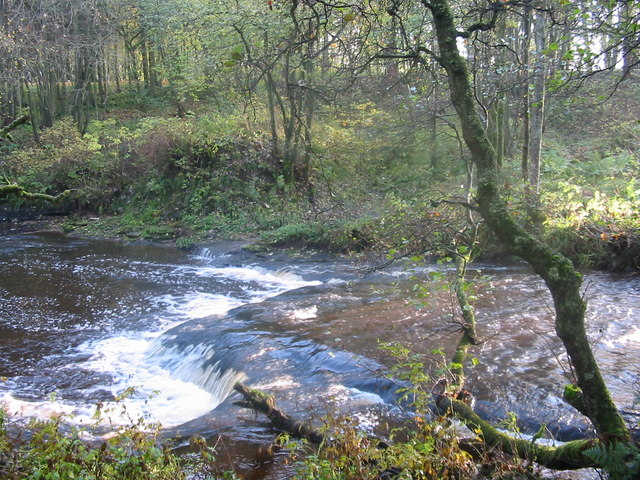
The Calder flowing through Calderglen Country Park

== Geography and general topography ==
The Rotten Calder runs through a gorge that is geographically designated the Calder Glen, which gives its name to Calderglen Country Park. This park delineated the section that flows past the eastern boundary of East Kilbride. Over 160 official, informal and abandoned walking trails border the river on both banks, in addition to the dense forest which occupies the slopes, and ferns, mosses and liverworts on the rocky precipices. European otter, roe deer and European green woodpecker can be seen in the southern reaches of the park. Common buzzards can be seen hunting over open areas by the river and the grey heron, grey wagtail and White-throated dipper are common sights too.

Beyond East Kilbride, the river flows via the north and western sides of Blantyre, flowing through the former country estates of Greenhall, Milheugh and Caldergrove, and thereby forms the eastern boundary of the Newton district of Cambuslang before joining the River Clyde at Turnlaw opposite Daldowie.

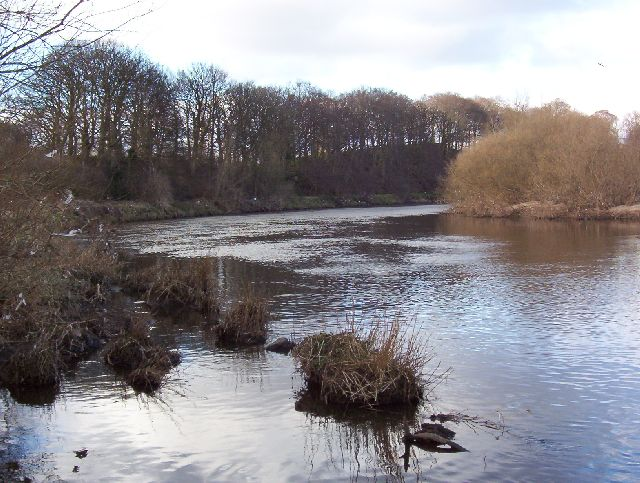
confluence of Clyde and the Rotten Calder near Daldowie

== Historical and scenic associations ==
The river flows past the site of Torrance House; the site of the former Torrance Kirk (St. Leonards Chapel); and past the site of the former Calderwood Castle (demolished 1947–1951). It also flows past the site of the small folly Craigneith Castle.

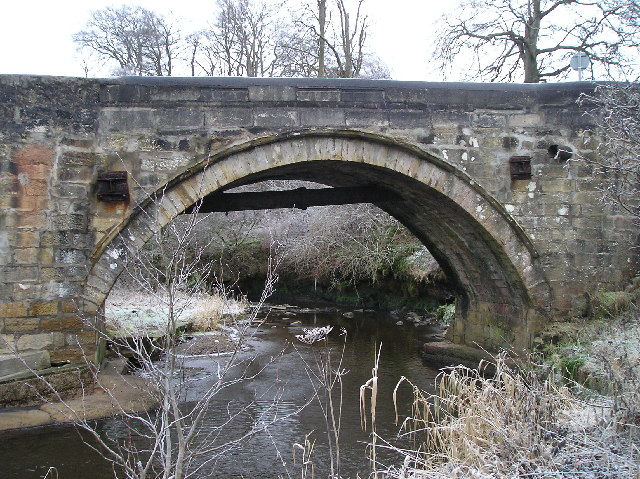
Stone bridge over Rotten Calder at Newhousemill Road on the edge of East Kilbride

The gorge of the Rotten Calder Water was celebrated in numerous books and poems over the centuries for its scenic grandeur and lush ivy-tied crags. Many traces of 18th- and 19th-century landscape additions can be traced in the park, as well as old mines, quarries, and religious sites. After passing under the General's Bridge at Stoneymeadow Road, the Water flows by Crossbasket Castle (House) in an easterly direction, and on through the former estates of Greenhall and Milheugh where the valley is seen to give way to wide haughlands (flood plains).

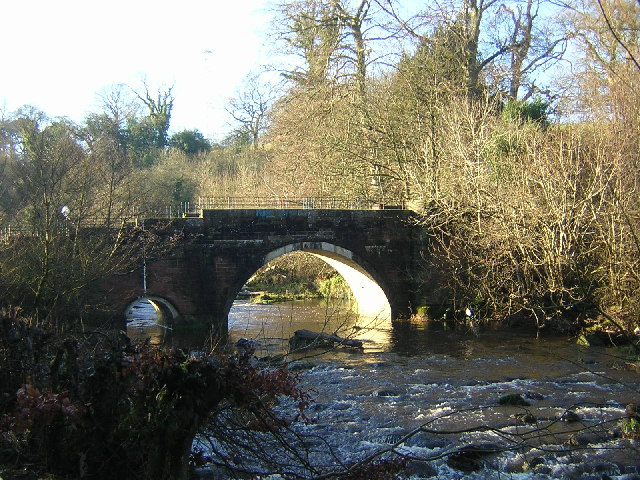
The Calder flowing under another stone bridge near High Blantyre

== Waterfalls ==
Beyond Milheugh the river once again regains its steep gorge profile and flows through wooded scenery before flowing into the River Clyde at Turnlaw opposite Daldowie. There are many sizeable waterfalls on the river, namely, working downstream: Cleughearn Linn, Flatt Linn, Crutherland Linn, Horseshoe Weir (Horseshoe Falls), Torrance Linn (Fairy Linn or Walkfoot Linn), Trough Linn, Black Linn, Old Horseshoe Linn, Small Linn, Calderwood Linn (Castle Falls), Crossbasket Linn, and Milheugh Falls.

== Angling ==
East Kilbride Angling Club have the fishing rights and stock the river with brown trout occasionally but not every year. Permits are available from calderglen visitor centre and the post office at the town centre

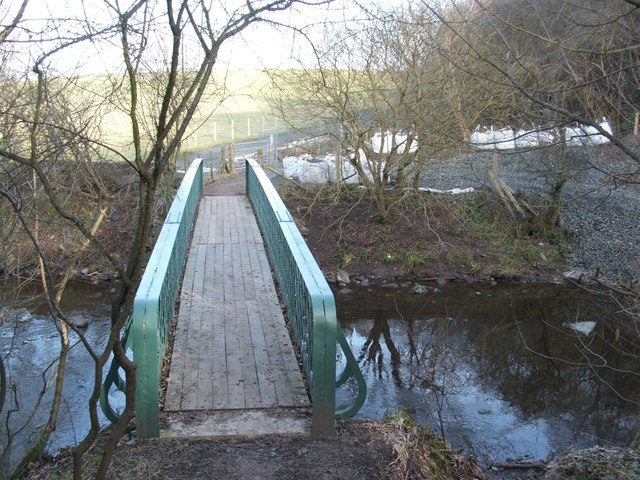
Footbridge over the Rotten Calder on the Clyde Walkway

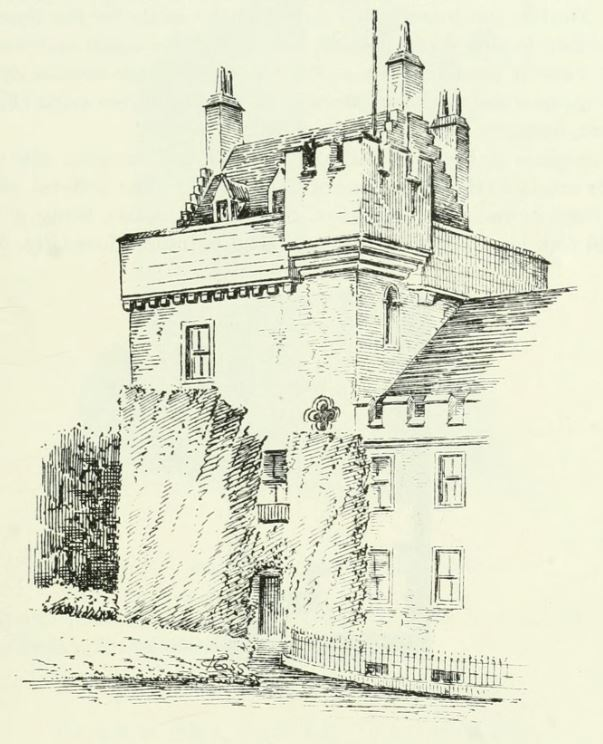
Crossbasket Castle towerhouse adjoining Crossbasket House as seen in 1887

In addition to Calderglen Park and Calderwood Castle, the river is referenced in other man-made features near its course, including the Calderwood residential area of East Kilbride, Calderglen High School in the same town, Calderglen House and the former Caldervale village near Blantyre, and Calderside Academy in the same town.

== See also ==
- North Calder Water, flows through North Lanarkshire to the Clyde from near Caldercruix to Daldowie, its mouth on the north bank almost opposite that of the Rotten Calder on the south bank
- South Calder Water, also flows through North Lanarkshire to the Clyde from near Shotts to Strathclyde Park
