= 1962 in Scottish television =

This is a list of events in Scottish television during 1962.

== Events ==
- 14 March – tenth anniversary of the first broadcast of the BBC One Scotland.
- 16 August – the BBC airs the original series of Dr. Finlay's Casebook.
- Unknown – The Beatles make their first appearance on STV.

== Debuts ==
=== BBC ===
- 16 August – Dr. Finlay's Casebook (1962–1971)

=== ITV ===
- Unknown – The Adventures of Francie and Josie (1962–1970)

== Television series ==
- Scotsport (1957–2008)
- The White Heather Club (1958–1968)

== Births ==
- 23 April – John Hannah, actor
- 23 April – Elaine Smith, actress
- 17 May – Craig Ferguson, television presenter
- 31 July – Jackie Bird, journalist and newsreader
- 25 November – Blythe Duff, actress
- 28 December – Kaye Adams, television presenter
- Unknown – Jack Docherty, comedian

== See also ==
- 1962 in Scotland
