= Sanderson High School, East Kilbride =

Sanderson High School

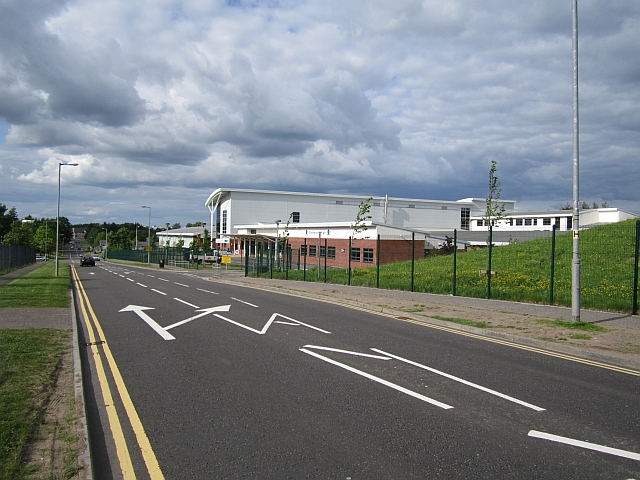

Location
- High Common Road; St Leonards; East Kilbride, G74 2LP; Scotland; 55.759429°N 4.151223°W

Information
- Established: 1994
- Authority: South Lanarkshire
- Head teacher: Katie Robinson
- Scottish Highers: 1st Years – 6th Years
- Gender: Mixed
- Enrollment: 111
- Website: Website

Sanderson High School is a non-denominational secondary school in East Kilbride, South Lanarkshire, Scotland for pupils with additional support needs. The school was established in June 1994 after the merger of Springhall School and Dalton School. The new school buildings were opened officially on 5 February 2009 (though by then had already been in use for some months) as part of South Lanarkshire Council’s Schools’ Modernisation Programme. It is the smallest high school in East Kilbride and shares a campus with Calderglen High School.
