= List of listed buildings in East Kilbride, South Lanarkshire =

This is a list of listed buildings in the parish of East Kilbride in South Lanarkshire, Scotland.

Name	Location	Date Listed	Grid Ref. (Note: Sometimes known as OSGB36, the grid reference (where provided) is based on the British national grid reference system used by the Ordnance Survey. • "Guide to National Grid". Ordnance Survey. • "Get-a-map". Ordnance Survey.)	Geo-coordinates	Notes	LB Number (Note: Historic Environment Scotland assign a unique alphanumeric identifier to each designated site in Scotland, for listed buildings this always begins with "LB", for example "LB12345".)	Image
Montgomery Street, Montgomerie Arms Hotel, Loupin-On-Stane				55°45′54″N 4°10′33″W	Category B	26611	Upload Photo
Stuart Street, Wellbeck House, Including Boundary Walls And Mews Cottages Numbered 1-4 (Inclusive)				55°45′53″N 4°10′25″W	Category B	26616	Upload Photo
15-17 (Odd Nos) Montgomery Street				55°45′55″N 4°10′35″W	Category C(S)	26617	Upload Photo
Kittochside, Carmunnock Road, Dykehead Farm, Kittochside, Including Outbuildings Gatepiers With Boundary Wall				55°46′40″N 4°12′33″W	Category B	26623	Upload Photo
1A, 1B, 1C Maxwelton Road				55°46′36″N 4°08′56″W	Category B	26608	Upload Photo
Newhouse				55°44′42″N 4°14′17″W	Category B	1009	Upload Photo
Lawside				55°44′39″N 4°14′41″W	Category B	1016	Upload Photo
Flatt Bridge				55°44′18″N 4°09′15″W	Category C(S)	100	Upload Photo
Calderglen Country Park (Formerly Torrance House Estate), Bridge				55°45′00″N 4°09′06″W	Category C(S)	48651	Upload Photo
Calderglen Country Park, (Formerly Torrance House Estate), Gatelodge, Gatepiers And Boundary Wall				55°45′01″N 4°09′08″W	Category C(S)	48652	Upload Photo
8-12 (Even Nos) Hunter Street				55°45′55″N 4°10′31″W	Category C(S)	48655	Upload Photo
96 And 98 Mains Street, Former Parish Council Chambers With Gatepiers And Boundary Wall				55°46′05″N 4°10′34″W	Category C(S)	48656	Upload Photo
114-118 (Even Nos) Maxwelton Avenue				55°46′07″N 4°09′46″W	Category C(S)	48666	Upload Photo
16-22 (Even Nos) Montgomery Street, William Hill (16) And Montgomery House (18-22)				55°45′55″N 4°10′34″W	Category C(S)	48674	Upload Photo
8-12 (Even Nos) Langland Place, Auldhouse Arms				55°43′34″N 4°11′31″W	Category C(S)	51123	Upload Photo
101 Maxwelton Avenue				55°46′08″N 4°09′42″W	Category C(S)	26609	Upload Photo
Montgomery Street, Montgomerie Arms Hotel				55°45′54″N 4°10′33″W	Category B	26610	Upload another image
3-5 (Odd Nos) Montgomery Street				55°45′54″N 4°10′34″W	Category B	26612	Upload Photo
10 -14 (Even Nos) Montgomery Street				55°45′55″N 4°10′34″W	Category B	26614	Upload Photo
Calderglen Country Park (Formerly Torrance House Estate), Statue Of Sir John Falstaff				55°44′56″N 4°08′48″W	Category C(S)	26625	Upload Photo
Mains Road, Mains Castle				55°46′41″N 4°11′21″W	Category A	26626	Upload another image See more images
8 Glebe Street				55°45′53″N 4°10′32″W	Category B	26628	Upload Photo
Crossbasket				55°47′00″N 4°07′40″W	Category A	1004	Upload another image
Dripps Mill House				55°46′08″N 4°16′55″W	Category C(S)	1012	Upload Photo
Dripps Mill				55°46′10″N 4°16′55″W	Category B	1013	Upload Photo
Bystone Mews				55°46′36″N 4°14′57″W	Category C(S)	1022	Upload Photo
Newhousemill Road, Newhousemill Cottages				55°45′21″N 4°08′50″W	Category C(S)	48677	Upload Photo
Kittochside Road, Castlehill (Including Walled Garden, Gatepiers And Boundary Walls) And Castlehill Steading				55°46′41″N 4°13′02″W	Category B	26621	Upload Photo
Kittochside, Carmunnock Road, Kittochside Cottages				55°46′42″N 4°12′51″W	Category B	26622	Upload Photo
181 Maxwelton Avenue, Alma, Including Gatepiers And Boundary Walls				55°46′02″N 4°09′49″W	Category B	1025	Upload Photo
Craig Mill, Packhorse Bridge, And Mill Dam				55°43′46″N 4°13′38″W	Category B	1015	Upload Photo
North Craighall Farm				55°44′31″N 4°14′28″W	Category B	1018	Upload Photo
103-105 (Odd Nos) Maxwelton Avenue				55°46′08″N 4°09′42″W	Category C(S)	48658	Upload Photo
115-121 (Odd Nos) Maxwelton Avenue				55°46′07″N 4°09′44″W	Category C(S)	48661	Upload Photo
136-140 (Even Nos) Maxwelton Avenue				55°46′06″N 4°09′47″W	Category C(S)	48667	Upload Photo
Montgomery Street, Old Parish Church				55°45′53″N 4°10′35″W	Category B	26615	Upload another image
Calderglen Country Park, Rangers Office (Formerly Torrance House Stables)				55°44′54″N 4°08′43″W	Category B	26624	Upload Photo
Philipshill Hospital Chapel				55°46′17″N 4°13′48″W	Category B	1026	Upload Photo
The Peel, Lodge				55°46′38″N 4°14′35″W	Category B	1007	Upload Photo
Cleughearn Lodge				55°42′31″N 4°11′05″W	Category B	1011	Upload Photo
1 And 1A Hunter Street And 2 Stuart Street				55°45′55″N 4°10′29″W	Category C(S)	47265	Upload Photo
Calderglen Country Park (Formerly Torrance House Estate), Gatepiers				55°44′57″N 4°08′46″W	Category C(S)	48653	Upload Photo
Calderglen Country Park, (Formerly Torrance House Estate), Torrance House And Courtyard				55°44′55″N 4°08′41″W	Category A	48654	Upload another image
107-111 (0Dd Nos) Maxwelton Avenue				55°46′07″N 4°09′43″W	Category C(S)	48659	Upload Photo
142 Maxwelton Avenue				55°46′06″N 4°09′47″W	Category C(S)	48668	Upload Photo
146 Maxwelton Avenue				55°46′05″N 4°09′48″W	Category C(S)	48670	Upload Photo
9 Montgomery Street And Boundary Wall				55°45′54″N 4°10′35″W	Category B	26613	Upload another image
12 Graham Avenue, Former Toll House				55°46′02″N 4°10′53″W	Category C(S)	26629	Upload Photo
Maxwelton Road, The Hunter Museum (Formerly Hunter House), Including Gatepiers And Boundary Wall				55°46′36″N 4°09′01″W	Category A	26607	Upload another image See more images
The Peel				55°46′40″N 4°14′41″W	Category A	1005	Upload another image
The Peel, Stable Or Barn				55°46′39″N 4°14′38″W	Category A	1006	Upload Photo
123-127 (Odd Nos) Maxwelton Avenue				55°46′07″N 4°09′44″W	Category C(S)	48662	Upload Photo
Montgomery Street, Old Parish Church, Kirkyard, Gateway, Boundary Wall, Railings, Session House And Stuarts Of Torrance Mausoleum				55°45′52″N 4°10′35″W	Category B	48672	Upload Photo
24 Montgomery Street				55°45′56″N 4°10′34″W	Category C(S)	48676	Upload Photo
Calderstone House				55°44′08″N 4°09′23″W	Category B	50796	Upload Photo
Markethill Road, Laigh Markethill Cottage				55°46′08″N 4°10′40″W	Category B	26620	Upload another image
Waterside House, Including Gates, Gatepiers And Boundary Wall				55°46′47″N 4°14′15″W	Category C(S)	6614	Upload Photo
Gill				55°45′13″N 4°14′59″W	Category C(S)	4875	Upload Photo
Kirkland Bridge				55°44′49″N 4°15′19″W	Category C(S)	1010	Upload another image See more images
Millbrae (Now Renamed Bryans)				55°45′39″N 4°13′59″W	Category B	1017	Upload Photo
Blackburn Mill				55°42′00″N 4°05′31″W	Category B	1019	Upload Photo
Bystone Lodge				55°46′36″N 4°14′55″W	Category B	1021	Upload Photo
19 Montgomery Street				55°45′55″N 4°10′35″W	Category C(S)	48673	Upload Photo
Old Coach Road, Old Toll House				55°46′08″N 4°10′37″W	Category C(S)	48680	Upload Photo
Brousterhill, Brousterlands				55°45′49″N 4°10′40″W	Category A	26619	Upload another image
Newhousemill Road, Newhouse House And Outbuildings				55°45′23″N 4°08′46″W	Category B	26627	Upload Photo
Stoneymeadow Road, General's Bridge				55°46′57″N 4°07′43″W	Category B	26606	Upload Photo
Wester Kittochside, Including Farmhouse, Steading, Dutch Barns, Boundary Walls And Gatepiers				55°46′49″N 4°13′14″W	Category A	1008	Upload Photo
Bystone House				55°46′33″N 4°14′55″W	Category B	1020	Upload Photo
Markethill Road, Statue Of Sir Walter Scott				55°46′08″N 4°10′40″W	Category C(S)	48657	Upload another image
106 Maxwelton Avenue				55°46′08″N 4°09′44″W	Category C(S)	48664	Upload Photo
144 Maxwelton Avenue				55°46′06″N 4°09′48″W	Category C(S)	48669	Upload Photo
Newhousemill Road, Newhouse Bridge				55°45′18″N 4°08′43″W	Category B	48678	Upload Photo
4 Newlands Place				55°45′43″N 4°10′45″W	Category C(S)	48679	Upload Photo
Priestknowe Roundabout, Hunter Memorial				55°45′51″N 4°10′24″W	Category B	48681	Upload Photo
Kittoch Street, West Kirk				55°45′57″N 4°10′41″W	Category B	26618	Upload another image
Whitemoss Avenue, St Bride's Roman Catholic Church, Including Presbytery And Ancillary Buildings				55°45′47″N 4°10′06″W	Category A	26630	Upload Photo
Braehead Farm, Braehead Road				55°46′18″N 4°14′13″W	Category B	6686	Upload Photo
Crag Tower, 1 Wellknowe Road, Thorntonhall				55°46′13″N 4°14′48″W	Category B	6404	Upload Photo
Waterfoot Bridge				55°46′10″N 4°16′54″W	Category B	1014	Upload Photo
129 Maxwelton Avenue				55°46′06″N 4°09′45″W	Category C(S)	48663	Upload Photo
110 Maxwelton Avenue				55°46′07″N 4°09′45″W	Category C(S)	48665	Upload Photo
Town Centre Park, Dollan Aqua Centre				55°45′43″N 4°10′57″W	Category A	48682	Upload another image

== Key ==
The scheme for classifying buildings in Scotland is:

- Category A: "buildings of national or international importance, either architectural or historic; or fine, little-altered examples of some particular period, style or building type."
- Category B: "buildings of regional or more than local importance; or major examples of some particular period, style or building type, which may have been altered."
- Category C: "buildings of local importance; lesser examples of any period, style, or building type, as originally constructed or moderately altered; and simple traditional buildings which group well with other listed buildings."

In March 2016 there were 47,288 listed buildings in Scotland. Of these, 8% were Category A, and 50% were Category B, with the remaining 42% being Category C.
