= Dollan Aqua Centre =

Public swimming-pool complex in South Lanarkshire, Scotland

Coordinates: 55°45′42.47″N 4°10′59.89″W

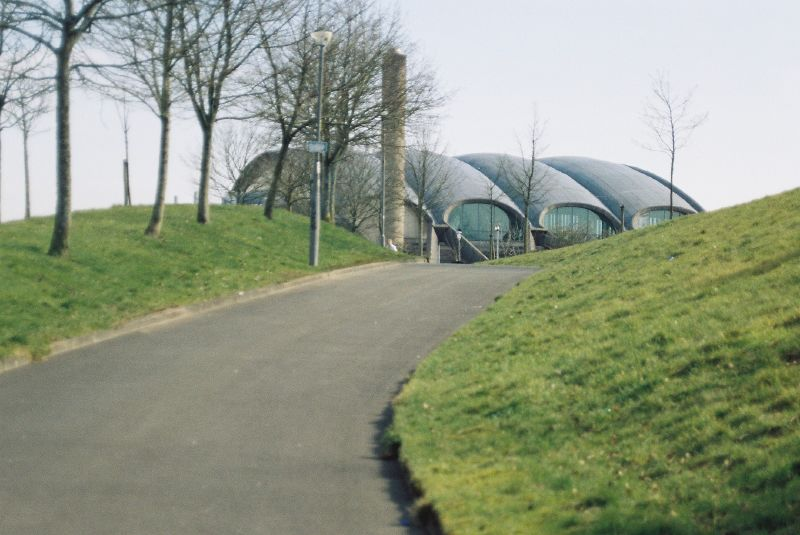
Dollan Baths

Dollan Aqua Centre (previously known as Dollan Baths) is a 20th-century category A listed building in East Kilbride, Scotland.

== Design ==
Designed by Alexander Buchanan Campbell and named after former Lord Provost Sir Patrick Dollan, it was opened in 1968 as Scotland's first 50-metre (although not Olympic standard) swimming pool. It consists principally of pre-stressed concrete and imitates a colossal marquee - the vaulted 324 ft parabolic arched roof appears to be held down by pairs of V-shaped-struts that meet the ground at a 30° angle.

Buchanan Campbell admitted that he had been influenced by the architecture of the 1964 Summer Olympics in Tokyo, Japan and the designs by Kenzo Tange for the gymnasium there.

In 1993, the international conservation organisation Docomomo International listed Dollan Baths as one of sixty key monuments in Scottish post-war architecture. It was listed in 2002 (as Dollan Aqua Centre) as a Category A building by Historic Scotland.

== Refurbishment ==
Structural engineering surveys showed that parts of the pool surround and pool tank were in a state of near collapse and emergency work had to be carried out to install temporary structural supports. The centre was closed in October 2008 for major refurbishment, consisting of structural repairs and replacements and the installation of new structural supports. This required a significant amount of structural engineering design input. The structure of the unique roof was not affected.

Substantial redesign and replacement of heating and ventilation and pool water treatment engineering services was carried out. This included new high-efficiency gas-fired boilers, a ventilation system for the swimming pool hall, a combined heat and power system, new water filters, and high-efficiency pumps as part of an upgraded pool water treatment system.

Electrical engineering and lighting systems were almost entirely replaced throughout the building. The external roof covering was replaced and an additional layer of thermal insulation was added to reduce heat loss from the roof and to provide extra protection for the roof structure. New lockers were provided for the changing rooms and the health suite. New tiles were placed for the pool and health suite. The repair work began in July 2009 and the Aqua Centre re-opened on 28 May 2011. The completion of the major repair and refurbishment contract cost over £9 million.

A further closure was required in 2019 when vandals broke into the premises and smashed a glass viewing panel below the water line, risking the entire contents of the pool flooding the rest of the building; this was averted by staff and emergency services, but the panel had to be sealed up.

== Facilities ==
Facilities include swimming pool with moveable floor, health suite and two fitness gyms, creche and cafe.

The Centre hosted the swimming events for the 2011 International Children's Games.

== See also ==
- List of Category A listed buildings in South Lanarkshire
- List of listed buildings in East Kilbride, South Lanarkshire
- List of post-war Category A listed buildings in Scotland
- List of Olympic size swimming pools in the United Kingdom
