= Alexander Buchanan Campbell =

Scottish architect

Alexander Buchanan Campbell (14 June 1914 – 13 May 2007) was a Scottish architect. He was born in Findochty in Moray.

He studied at the Glasgow School of Art (where he later taught) and was apprenticed to the firm of Gillespie, Kidd and Coia.

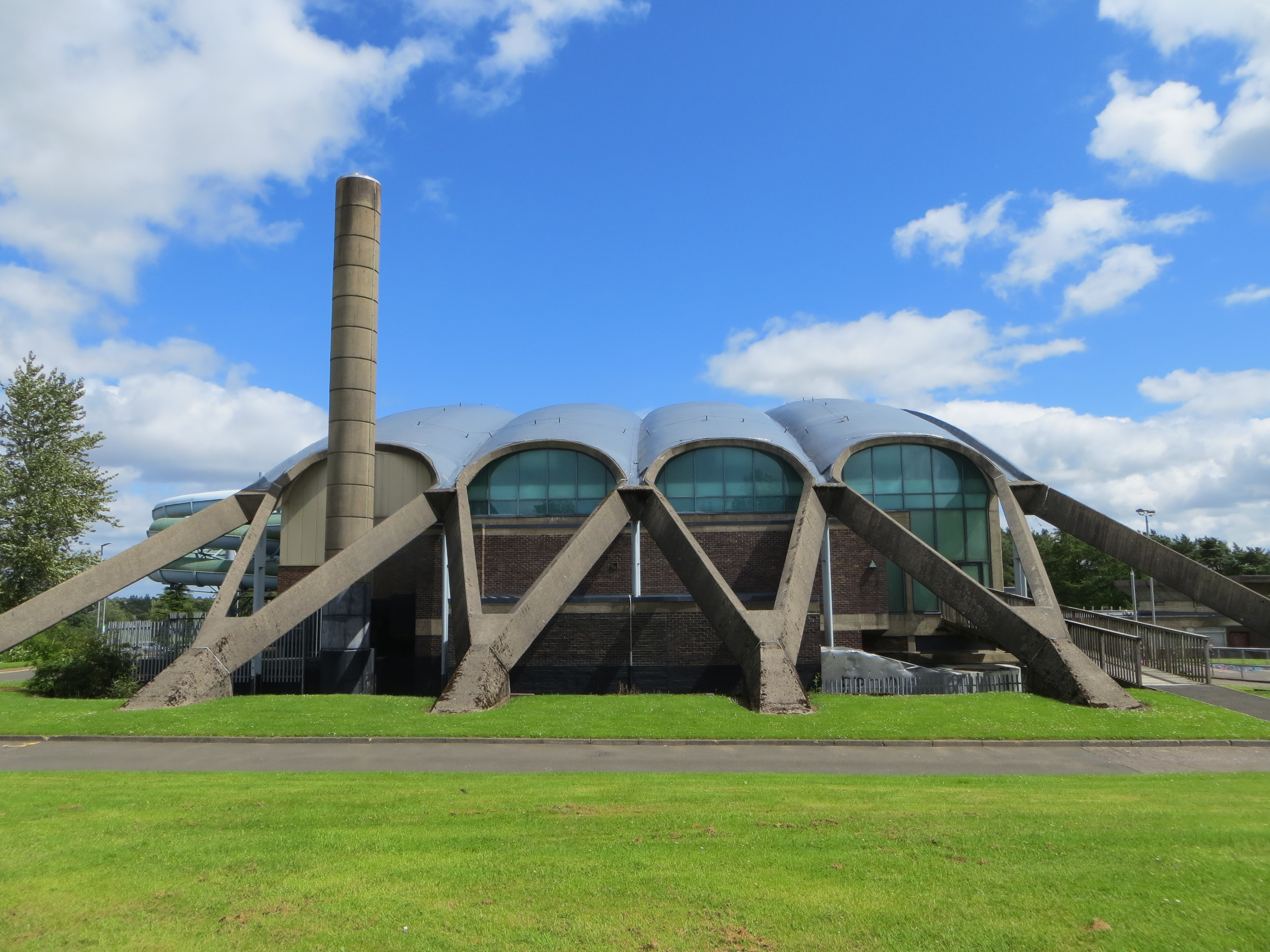
Dollan Baths, 2017

One of Buchanan Campbell's most notable works was the Dollan Baths complex in East Kilbride (opened 1968 and named after former Lord Provost Sir Patrick Dollan). Influenced by the Beaux-Arts style, his time with Coia and works of Pier Luigi Nervi and Kenzo Tange, the significance of Buchanan Campbell's Dollan Baths was recognised when Historic Scotland listed it as Category A in 2002.

Other significant work includes Craigie College, Ayr and alterations to Gillespie, Kidd and Coia's Notre Dame College in Bearsden, Glasgow.

Buchanan Campbell was president of Glasgow Art Club (1972–74), the Glasgow Institute of Architects (1974–76) and the Royal Incorporation of Architects in Scotland (1977–79).

In 1995 Buchanan Campbell gifted his papers to the Royal Commission on the Ancient and Historical Monuments of Scotland.

He was married to Sheila (Neville- Smith) Campbell, they had one daughter, Alexis Louise Leech, and one son, Euan Buchanan Campbell.
