= Calderglen High School =

Location
- High Common Road; St Leonards; East Kilbride, G74 2LP; Scotland; 55.759429°N 4.151223°W

Information
- School type: State-funded Public
- Head teacher: Liz White
- Age: 11 to 18
- Language: English, Scottish Gaelic
- Campus: Main Building, Sports Facility (Attached to main building)
- Houses: Jura, Tiree, Lewis, Uist and Harris
- Accreditation: Scottish Qualifications Authority
- Website: Official website

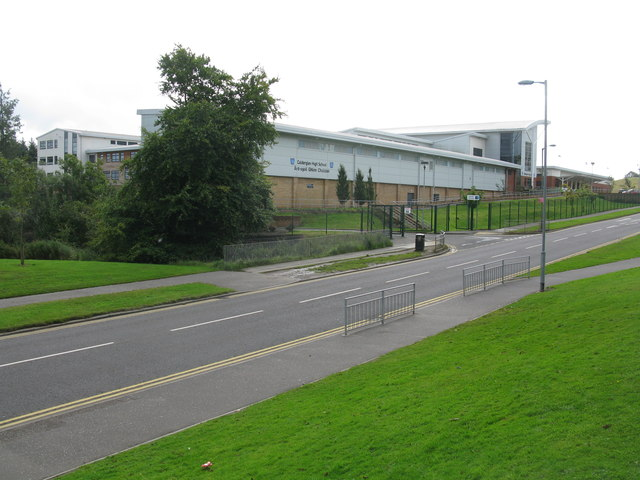
School buildings, 2012

Calderglen High School (Scottish Gaelic: Àrd-sgoil Ghlinn Challdair) is a state-run secondary school in the St Leonards area of the Scottish new town East Kilbride, in South Lanarkshire. The complex of buildings is situated on the precipitous bank of the Rotten Calder Water, overlooking a meander named the 'School Bend'. The school derives its name from the Calder Glen (gorge) which the river occupies, which is a site of special scientific interest (SSSI). The school has a potential pupil roll of approximately 1200, with 86 teachers. The school's houses are named Jura, Uist, Harris, Tiree and Lewis.

The school was established after the merger of Hunter High School and Claremont High School. Calderglen occupies the site of the former Claremont High, and was opened on 18 February 2008. The campus is shared with Sanderson High School, a special school catering for students with learning difficulties.

== Modernisation ==
The schools of Hunter and Claremont High School were in need of renewal due to wear and tear of the buildings. Leaks had started and asbestos damage was becoming a major issue. After consideration by South Lanarkshire Council, it was proposed to merge the two, and rename the new school Calderglen High. The other four high schools in East Kilbride (Ballerup, Duncanrig, St Andrew's and St Bride's) have also merged into another two new schools (a replacement Duncanrig Secondary and St Andrew's and St Bride's High School respectively).

Construction of the school started in 2004/2005 next to the existing Claremont building in St Leonards, and was to be ready at the start of the 2007/2008 school year, but was completed six months late. The Claremont building has been demolished and in its place is a new all-weather sports pitch facility. The site of Hunter High School is mostly occupied by a housing development.

== Notable former pupils ==
Notable alumni of Calderglen's predecessor schools, Claremont and Hunter, include footballer and former Rangers F.C. manager Ally McCoist, television presenter Lorraine Kelly, actor John Hannah, MSP and former health minister Andy Kerr
