= Crutherland =

Suburb of East Kilbride, South Lanarkshire, Scotland

Coordinates: 55°44′31″N 4°09′20″W

Crutherland is an informal collective title for a small suburb situated on the southeast edge of East Kilbride town. It backs onto Torrance House Golf Course (part of Calderglen Country Park) to the east. Around 60 large houses were built there in 2006 -2007 by several developers. It is situated adjacent to the Crutherland House Hotel from which it takes its name, although is not situated on the lands of Crutherland itself. Part of the suburb had a development name of Crutherland Gate, which seems to have popularised the 'Crutherland' moniker for the whole. The streets comprise Torrance Wynd, Torrance Court, Torrance Gait, and Torrance Lane in the south, and Torrance Avenue in the north. A lesser used informal alias for the suburb is 'Torrance' for obvious reasons.
