= Calderwood Castle =

Former castle in South Lanarkshire, Scotland

Coordinates: 55.77187°N 4.13383°W

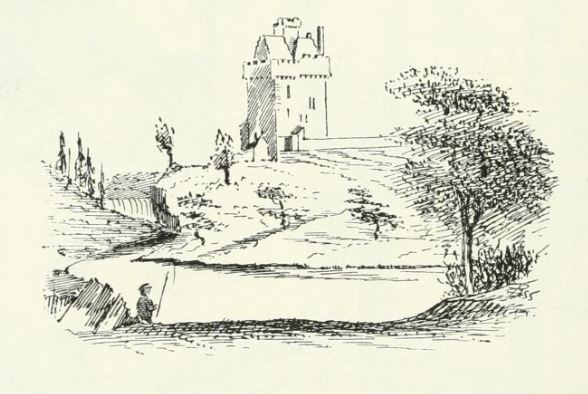
Calderwood Castle on the banks of the Calder in 1765

Calderwood Castle was located in East Kilbride, Scotland. The historically recorded castle was situated on a precipice on the western bank of the Rotten Calder Water in Calderwood Glen, now part of Calderglen Country Park. Most likely constructed in the early to mid fifteenth century by the Maxwell family, the original peel tower collapsed in 1773 following several days of stormy weather. This building, known architecturally from a mid eighteenth century drawing, was replaced by an extension to the pre-existing late 17th-century country house called Calderwood House. These sections and later additions, including an 1840s Gothic Revival extension, were all demolished in the period circa 1943-1951.

== History ==
An earlier building is suggested to have stood on the site due to the estate's older association with the origins of the Calderwood family. However, such an edifice more likely occupied a more defensible fortified manor site to the northwest, forming part of Barrie Road and Allers Allotments. Traditional sources allege that this earlier building and its estate belonged to the Barony of Mearns (Roland De Mernis); being passed to the Maxwells of Pollok through an alleged marriage. However, charter rolls and legal records point to the lands of Calderwood being broken up during the Wars of Scottish Independence, and a major portion later coming into the hands of the Maxwell family. Such a marriage with the De Merns family is not explicitly testified by extant genealogical records.

The first known castle built on the 'Dee of Calder' in the Calderglen gorge, was a large rectangular tower house. It was constructed in the early 15th century, as ascertained from stylistic features known from early drawings, as well as historical literature. The castle may have been added to in the 16th century. This building, historically described as two adjoining towers sharing an extraordinarily thick middle wall, collapsed in January 1773 following several days of storms.

The late seventeenth century house, of an austere tenemental appearance, was added to in the period 1775-1785 by a complimentary east wing on the site of the former tower, but incorporating some foundational elements of the older edifice. This was added to in the early nineteenth century by a smaller still extension on the edge of the wing, which incorporated the 'Abbotsford Morning Room' modelled on Scot's 'Oak Room' or personal library at Abbotsford in the Scottish Borders. The buildings were again extended and completed in 1841. This later development was executed in a spectacular form of castellated Gothic Revival design, quite unique in its inclusion of a 50 ft complex octagonal tower as its centrepiece.

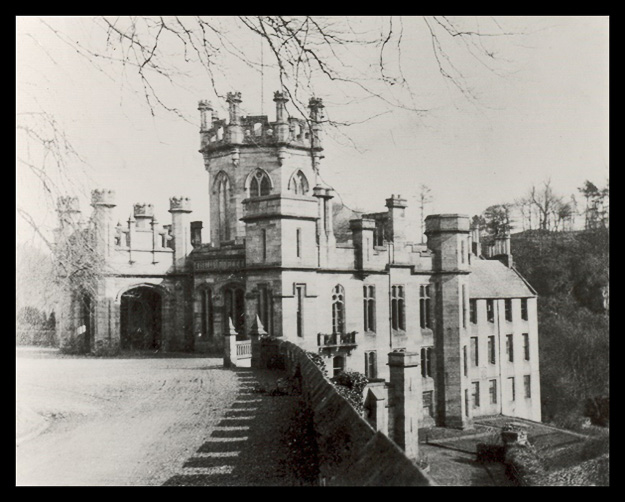
1904 view, from S-by-SW, showing Calderwood 'Castle' with its Gothic Revival additions, and part of the Rear Drive and parapet

The Gothic extension has been attributed to David Rhind, who was prominent during the period and on personal terms with the Maxwells of Calderwood. He advertised for the building contracts in the late 1830s. This architect is also thought to have designed the Maxwellton Schoolhouse, within a small weaving village of that name on the Calderwood Estate that is still in a good state of preservation within the new town of East Kilbride.

In 1904 the Calderwood estate was sold to the Scottish Co-operative Wholesale Society (S.C.W.S.), which used it for agriculture, primarily cane and soft fruit growing, and then oats, dairy farming, and various other enterprises. The society also opened up the glen - referred to as a white elephant - as a public pleasure ground, and very briefly turned the castle into a co-operative museum. The estate became very popular, to the extent it was labelled as one of the most Romantic or Picturesque glens in the West of Scotland, such was public awareness of its grounds that would otherwise have remained private. Calderwood Glen Platform was opened on the Blantyre to East Kilbride line to serve the Calderwood Estate's visitors in 1907, closing during World War I, before reopening on a restricted service which lingered until 1939.

During the First World War, around 200 Belgian refugees were housed in the castle.

The country house fell into some state of disrepair following a fire at the time of its handover by the S.C.W.S. to the Commissioner for Special Areas in Scotland. During this time the estate was used for agricultural experiments and an effort to aid the mass unemployed through smallholding projects. These efforts did not flourish and mostly failed. The estate was then used briefly for billeting troops during the Second World War. Further fires and much vandalism was perpetrated to the interiors in this period, and the overall cost of maintenance led to further decline. Rooms became severely damp and mouldy. Salvagers began demolishing the building during the Second World War, and used adjacent land as a scrap yard, which included remains recovered from bombed sites in Glasgow.

The estate was purchased by East Kilbride Development Corporation in 1947, by which time most of the castle was already demolished apart from the listing octagonal tower. The remaining sections were demolished by the Royal Eningeers with explosives in 1951, as a training exercise and a way for the Corporation to escape conventional demolition costs. Nothing now remains except for heavily obscured and half-buried ruins and rubble, as well as the intact walled driveway and terrace walls which fronted the building and its south drive. Much remains of the underbuilding around the Dee of Calder Promontory, including massive retaining walls and vaulted chambers utilised for drainage. The castle cellars and foundational moisture gaps remain and were a haunt of successive generations of children from the 1960s to the 1980s. They were finally sealed off using pitch ash during the 1980s.

The now-ruined Craigneith Castle is located on the opposite side of the river, atop a range of lofty cliffs. This served as 1) a decorative folly, visible from Calderwood; 2) a viewing pavilion for the Calderwood Linn waterfall upriver, as well as the main house and wider glen; and 3) as practical servants' quarters.

== Depictions ==
An engraved view from 1788 by A. Robertson, produced after a sketch by Paul Sandby from c. 1750-51, depicts the castle as viewed from the southeast, upon the banks of the Craigneith Burn. The engraving is indexed in a prominent collection as having derived from Forsyth's Beauties of Scotland, although no editions of this book were ever published to contain the engraving. The engraved view does appear in the August 1788 edition of the "Edinburgh Magazine or Literary Miscellany". As such, it is suspected the HES copy has its source misattributed or that it was derived from a copy of Forsyth's work with 'tipped in' views gathered from periodical sources. Sandby worked his ink and bistre sketch up into a more complex watercolour with figures and cattle. This later view is undated, but is plausibly close in date to the other due to it bearing Sandby's earlier style. The original sketch is held by the National Library of Wales, having originally belonged to the antiquarian and naturalist Thomas Pennant. The worked-up watercolour has an uncertain provenance, but was sold a few decades ago privately by public auction to an American solicitor. It then re-entered the market in 2023.

On the same sketching visit of P. Sandby in 1750-51, he produced a further view of Calderwood Linn, the glen's feature waterfall which lay a short distance from the house. This view features on the verso of a better known view by him of Bothwell Castle. This sketch was unknown until 2015 when Chris Ladds, a topographical historian, found reference to the wash drawing of a waterfall named "Calderwood Linn on the Clyde". The Sandby sketch of the waterfall belonged to the Scottish antiquarian David Laing, and is now in the collection of drawings held at the National Galleries of Scotland prints room, Edinburgh.

Another engraving features in facsimile in Castellated and Domestic Architecture of Scotland by MacGibbon & Ross, which is based upon an original sketch described in that source "W. Binton, 1765". It has been shown through examination of this sketch and similar that this in fact reads "N. Britain", a reference to 'North Britain' or Scotland, instead of a signature. This engraving is believed to be copied after a lost original by Sandby in addition to numerous others, which may be held by the King's topography collection at the British Library. Confusion over this matter has caused the drawing to be lost to those trying to located for the past century. This view was rediscovered in 2015, again by C. Ladds, and is also in the possession of the National Galleries of Scotland.

A painting of the castle by Robert Purves Bell, representing a crude copy of the Robertson engraving, is in the collection of South Lanarkshire Council. They also possess a more accomplished view of Calderwood Linn within its setting, painted by the same artist.

== Calderwood name ==
Calderwood Castle, in the traditional opinion of many genealogical groups, is thought to have been anciently possessed by a family bearing the name Calderwood. In fact, Calderwood is so ancient a name that it predates Castles in their modern interpretation, and certainly dates to before the known edifices in Calderwood GLen. Documents regarding the ancient lands of Calderwood and family are scarce, but do suggest that the name descends from a small village or possibly a defended iron-age town (oppidum), as referred to in marriage charters. There were several Calderwood landholdings in the area following the Wars of Scottish Independence, and many retainers of the lands could have gone by this territorial surname, rather than deriving it from any fortification.

== See also ==
- Maxwell of Calderwood baronetcy
