= Calderglen Country Park =

Country park in South Lanarkshire, Scotland

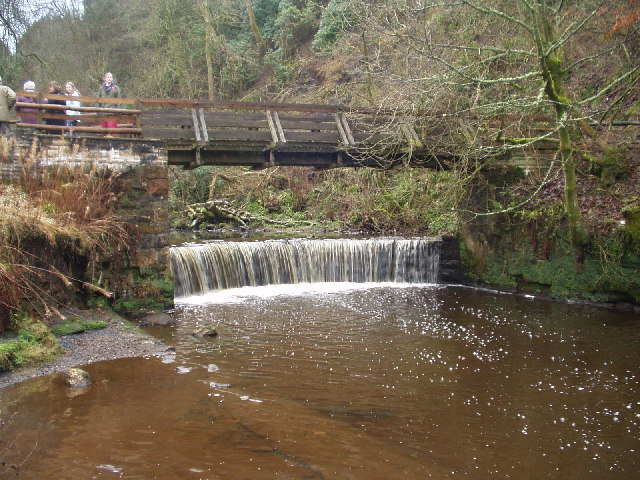
- Horseshoe Falls bridge over the Rotten Calder
- Interactive map of Calderglen Country Park
- Type: Country park
- Location: East Kilbride, Scotland
- OS grid: NS653524
- Coordinates: 55.748482°N 4.144704°W
- Area: 121 hectares (299 acres)
- Operator: South Lanarkshire Council

Calderglen Country Park is a country park in the town of East Kilbride, South Lanarkshire, Scotland. It is situated along the eastern edge of the town and is its principal area designated for recreation and leisure in a countryside setting. It falls within a longstanding area of greenbelt, which distinguishes it from intra-urban greenspace.

== Description ==
The park was designated in 1978 and was officially opened in 1982. It features a small zoo, children's play facilities, display, function and exhibition venues, a large and scenic wooded river gorge with several large waterfalls, the Courtyard Café, a tropical hothouse, and several sports clubs within its curtilage, including Torrance Golf Club and East Kilbride Sports Club.

The visitor centre and adjoining facilities centre upon Torrance House, which dates to the 17th, 18th and late 19th centuries and is a Category A listed building. Modern built facilities occupy parts of its adjoining landscaped policies.

The central area of the park is approached from the old entrance lodge house at Strathaven Road via the tree-lined driveway which leads through the old policies towards Torrance House. The wider park asset comprises the wooded gorge portions of the once extensive Calderwood, Mauchlinhole and Torrance Estates, with Calderwood Glen occupying the northernmost stretch of the Rotten Calder Water, and Torrance Glen the southernmost part. Several miles of official nature trails run through the park (some prone to landslips), with the longest combined route running along the western banks from Old Flatt Bridge in the south to the Hamilton to East Kilbride Expressway (A725) in the north. The gorge side within the northern part of the park is a site of special scientific interest for its comprehensive sequence through Scottish Carboniferous geology, including abundant fossil remains. The Rotten Calder Water features a number of scenic waterfalls along its course, namely, from south to north: Flatt Linn, Crutherland Linn, the Horseshoe Weir (colq. Horseshoe Falls), Torrance Linn, Trough Linn, Black Linn, the Old Horseshoe Linn, the Small Linn, and finally the largest of the falls, Calderwood Linn (colq. Castle Falls). The designated woodland coverage within the park totals 33 hectares (82 acres).

Calderglen is situated near to the industrial zone of Kelvin, the established residential neighbourhoods of St. Leonards and Calderwood, East Kilbride, and a small 21st century suburban development collectively referred to as Crutherland. It also adjoins the country hotel and farm estates of Crutherland to the south.

== Gallery ==
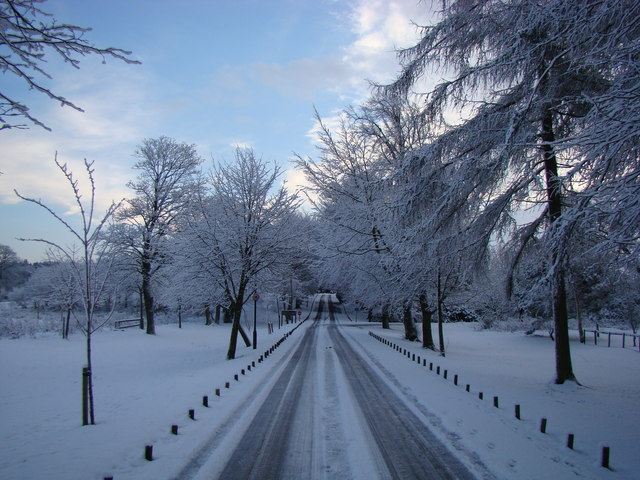
Driveway through the park after snowfall

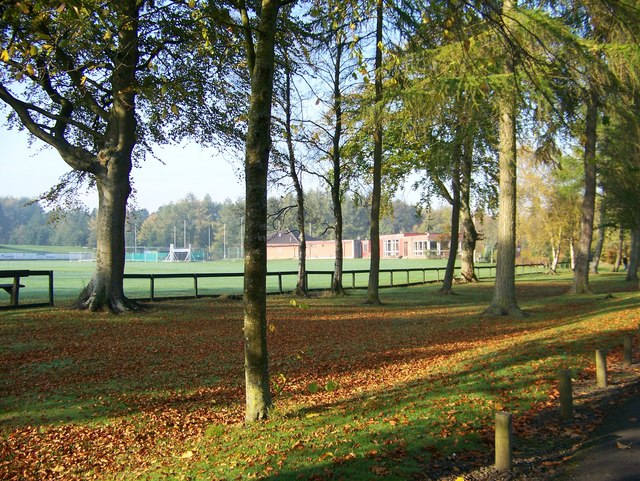
The Sports Club, Calderglen Country Park

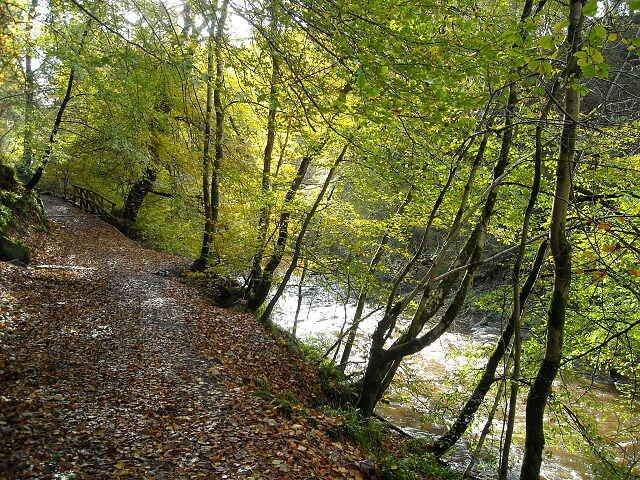
Typical forest walking path along the banks of the Rotten Calder

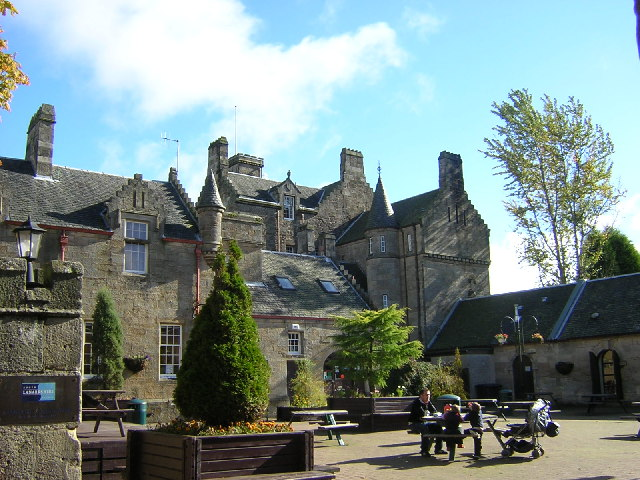
Torrance House courtyard with picnic tables

== Recreational facilities, attractions and other buildings ==
- Mini zoo, featuring small animals such as meerkats, prairie dogs and owls outdoors, and reptiles and fish in a tropical glasshouse
- Ornamental gardens and pond with a chilling statue of Falstaff (previously located at Castlemilk House in Glasgow - Castlemilk and Torrance House were both owned for centuries by the Stuart family)
- Football facility K-Park Training Academy and small stadium which is home to East Kilbride F.C.
- Rugby grounds which are home to East Kilbride RFC
- Tennis facilities operated by East Kilbride Lawn Tennis Club
- Cricket pitch, home to East Kilbride Cricket Club formed in 1962
- Torrance House Golf Club opened in 1969, available for public bookings
- Wooded riverside walks through gorge of Calderglen formed by the Rotten Calder river near to the Calderwood and St Leonards residential areas.
- Several archaeological and designed landscape features, including the sites of Torrance Doocot, Craigneith Castle, Calderwood Castle, and Calderwood Mausoleum.
- Modern outdoor playground for children
- Gift shop within the Calderglen Conservatory
- Courtyard Café within the historic stables and coach house range attached to Torrance House
- One of the main HQ buildings of SLC Greenspace ranger service, within the former Torrance factor offices
