= Hunter House Museum =

Former museum in South Lanarkshire, Scotland

Coordinates: 55.77671°N 4.15029°W

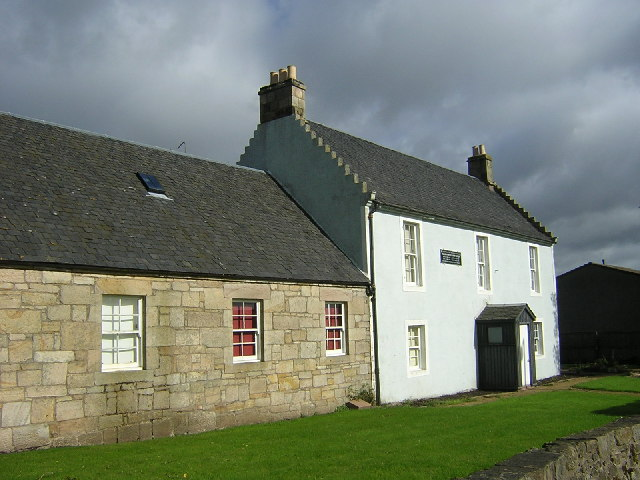
Hunter House Museum, East Kilbride.

Hunter House Museum was a museum in Calderwood, East Kilbride, South Lanarkshire, Scotland.

== Description ==
Hunter House forms part of the original Long Calderwood Farm, purchased in the early 18th Century by John Hunter, father of William Hunter FRS (1718–1783) who became a leading anatomist, and John Hunter FRS (1728–1793), a physician and surgeon. The landholding itself has considerably earlier origins. Between the 1940s and 1960s the surrounding land was swallowed up by housing after East Kilbride was designated Scotland's first new town to alleviate serious housing issues, primarily in Glasgow.

The museum, which contained exhibits relating to the medical pioneer brothers and also covered the local history of East Kilbride, closed in February 2011 due to funding cuts in South Lanarkshire. The artefacts which were within the museum were removed for safekeeping. William Hunter's main collection can be found at the Hunterian Museum and Art Gallery, which is part of Glasgow University. John Hunter's main collection is displayed at the Hunterian Museum at the Royal College of Surgeons in London, England.

Calderwood Baptist Church, based at the adjacent property, was one of four applicants to use the building, and in November 2011 they took ownership. The building was renovated and reopened in 2013, being used for a multitude of purposes including a community cafe run by volunteers.

== Gallery ==
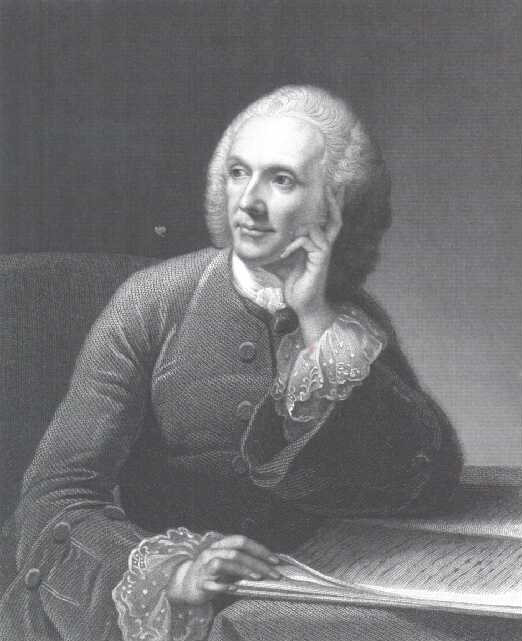
William Hunter FRS, anatomist and physician.

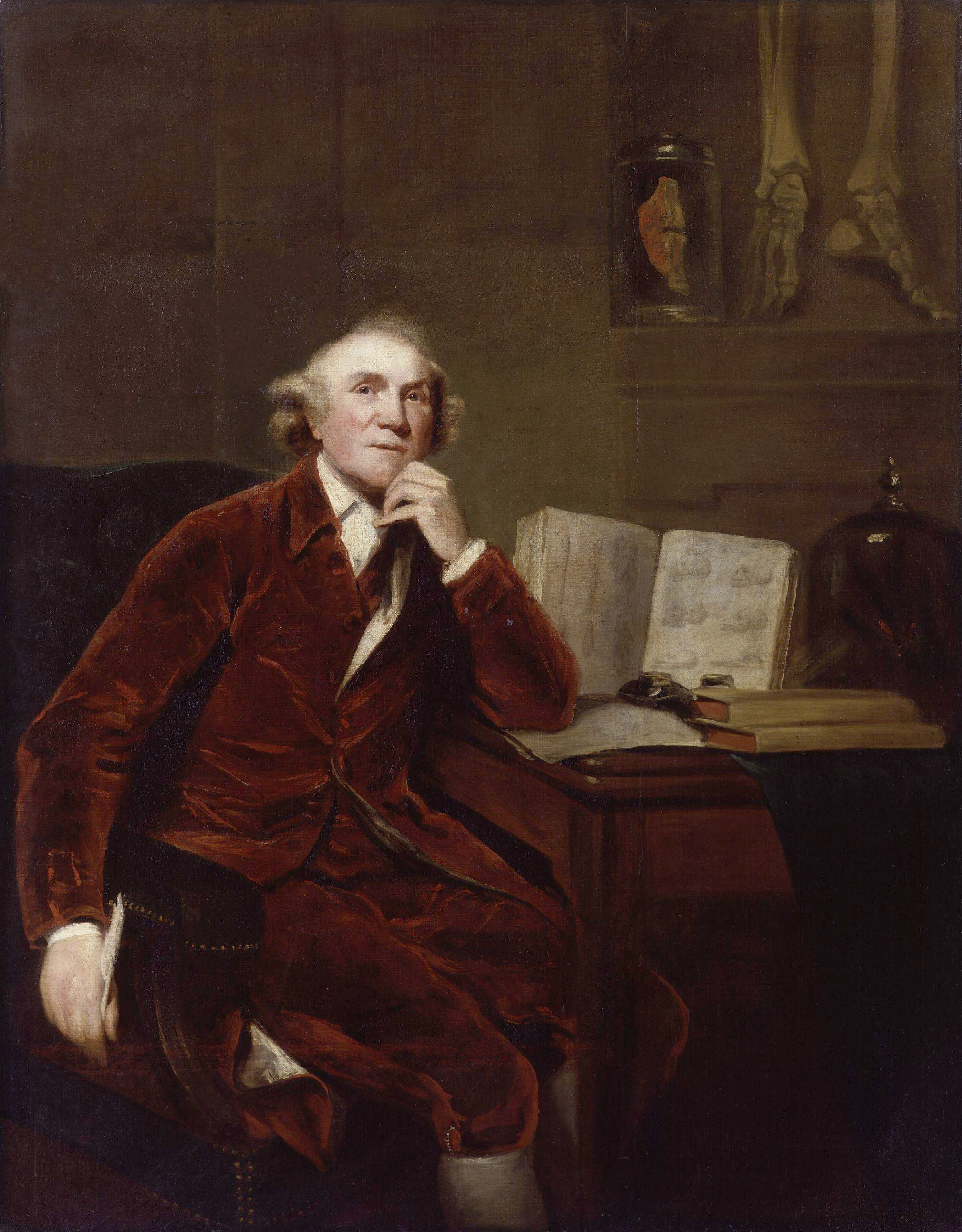
John Hunter FRS, surgeon.

== See also ==
- List of Category A listed buildings in South Lanarkshire
- List of listed buildings in East Kilbride, South Lanarkshire
