= Claremont High School, East Kilbride =

Secondary school in South Lanarkshire, Scotland

Coordinates: 55°45′28″N 4°09′02″W

Claremont High School

Location
- High Common Road; East Kilbride, South Lanarkshire, G74 2DA; Scotland

Information
- Type: Secondary School
- Motto: Endeavour
- Established: 1970
- Closed: June 2007 / February 2008
- Local authority: South Lanarkshire Council
- Gender: Mixed
- Age: 11 to 18
- Enrolment: 1,100
- Houses: Bute, Crawford, Everest, Fraser. (Until 1993, Arran and Douglas were also school houses).

Claremont High School was a non-denominational, state-funded secondary school based in the St Leonards area of East Kilbride. It closed in June 2007 and merged with Hunter High School to form the new Calderglen High School, although Calderglen met in the Claremont building until February 2008 when the new building opened on the same site. It was originally one of six state Secondary schools in East Kilbride until, after a school modernisation program by South Lanarkshire Council, they were merged into three schools.

Nearby, the local Church of Scotland parish Church uses the same name, 'Claremont Parish Church'.

== Studio32 Theatre Company ==
A teachers' strike in 1985 led to the establishment of Studio32 Theatre Company by Liane Mitchell née Craig and Vikki Carrick, an amateur theatre company that has since grown to be the leading community theatre company in the area. The name refers to the drama classroom in the school (A32) where rehearsals were first held.

Studio32 celebrated its 30th anniversary in 2015 with a production of Oliver!.

The company celebrated 40 years in 2025 with sell out performances of Calendar Girls in the East Kilbride Arts Centre, Kinky Boots in the Village Theatre, and the Pantomime "Little Red Riding Hood" at the Arts Centre in December of that year.

== Notable alumni ==
- Lee Gibson, Scotland Women's International Footballer
- John Hannah, Actor
- Lorraine Kelly, Television presenter
- Andy Kerr, Scottish Politician
- Fraser Kerr, Footballer currently with Stenhousemuir
- Jordan McGhee, Scotland U21 International Footballer, currently with Dundee
- Iain Stewart, Geologist
- Alasdair Strokosch, Scotland International Rugby player
- Robbie Winters, Scotland International Footballer
- Frazer Wright, Former Footballer
