= Blythe Duff =

Scottish actress

- Born: 25 November 1962 (age 63); East Kilbride, Lanarkshire, Scotland
- Occupation: Actress
- Years active: 1984–present
- Spouse: Tom Forrest (m. 1998)

Blythe Duff (born 25 November 1962) is a Scottish actress best known for her role as Jackie Reid in the ITV television series drama Taggart.

== Background ==
Duff was born and raised in East Kilbride. Her love of acting started with youth theatre. On leaving Hunter High School she joined The Company, a youth opportunities theatre company, based at the Glasgow Arts Centre in Washington Street and spent her summers with the Scottish Youth Theatre. She entered the profession in 1983 with her first job at the Young Playwrights Festival (Scottish Youth Theatre/The Traverse).

== Career ==
Duff's career began in the theatre, starting with the Scottish Youth and Community Theatre in Glasgow.

She worked in theatre for seven years, appearing with Scottish Opera in Street Scene as Shirley Kaplan in 1989, and at the Coliseum Theatre in London with the English National Opera. She also performed on the soundtrack album which was released on Decca Records in 1989. She was working for Scottish Opera when she landed the role of Jackie Reid in the sixth series of Taggart in 1990. Her first appearance was a community police officer in the second episode of the sixth series, "Death Comes Softly", on 3 December 1990, in which she is credited as playing WPC Reid. In the third episode, which first aired on 31 December 1990, she was credited as playing Jackie Reid and her character was seconded to CID as DC Reid. By series eight in 1993 her character was promoted to Detective Sergeant. She became the longest-serving member of the Taggart cast after James Macpherson left the show in 2002. The last Taggart episode was shown in 2010, seeing Jackie Reid reach Detective Inspector.

On 28 November 2003, she was a guest on the daytime talk show Today with Des and Mel. On 23 June 2004 she was a contestant on the celebrity comedy game show Win, Lose or Draw Late. She has also appeared twice as a guest on the daytime talk show Loose Women on 24 September 2004 and 15 September 2005.

On 26 April 2006, Duff appeared in the documentary There's Been a Murder: A Celebration of Taggart.

In October 2008 she attended the Mipcom television festival in Cannes, France, along with the other three main cast members, John Michie, Alex Norton and Colin McCredie to highlight the 25th anniversary of Taggart.

=== Theatre work ===
Away from filming Taggart, Duff enjoys live performance and has said that she prefers to work in theatre: "I love working on Taggart. I like my character and I like all the people I work with. I have been in Taggart since 1990 so I can't imagine my life without it, but I really like working on stage. That is where I feel very comfortable and I like the response of an audience good or bad."

In 1995 she played Rhona Clay in Swing Hammer Swing at the Citizens Theatre in Glasgow.

She starred in the European premiere of Mum's the Word in Spring 2002, which toured around Scotland and included a four-week run at the King's Theatre in Glasgow. She later reprised her role for Volcanic Productions for a tour of New Zealand.

At the Traverse Theatre in Edinburgh, Duff has appeared in "Good With people", Intolerance, King of the Fields, Sharp Shorts, "Tally's Blood", "Sheila", and "The Young Playwright's Festival".

In February 2006 she appeared with the National Theatre of Scotland in their first production "Home, Glasgow" Cranhill, Glasgow. In January 2009 she appeared in a National Theatre of Scotland/Donmar Warehouse tour of Scotland and England of the play Be Near Me adapted by Ian McDiarmid from the novel of the same name by Andrew O'Hagan.

She has won Best Female Performance twice at the Critics' Awards for Theatre in Scotland: in 2013 for her portrayal of Fay Black in Rona Munro's prison drama 'Iron'; and in 2014 for the titular role in David Harrower's 'Ciara'.

Duff has also appeared on radio, including the BBC Radio 4 comedy panel game Just a Minute.

On the concert platform she has narrated with numerous orchestras; the RSNO, the BBC Symphony Orchestra and the Scottish Opera Orchestra. She has recorded Hansel and Gretel by Savourna Stevenson with the Scottish Opera Orchestra, and recorded an audio book of "44 Scotland Street" by Alexander McCall Smith.

In 2011, she made her New York debut, playing Carlotta Burns in "Beautiful Burnout" (Frantic Assembly/NTS) at St Ann's Warehouse, Brooklyn, and reprised the role for the Sydney, Perth and Wellington Festivals in 2012.

In 2010, Blythe formed Datum Point Productions to capitalise on the wealth of talent in the theatre, film and TV industry in Scotland. The company filmed Sarajevo, a 20-minute monologue set in an empty classroom, which follows Rachael Lewis as she prepares a farewell speech for the retiring head teacher. In Feb 2011 Just Checking successfully played at the Tron Theatre, Glasgow to full houses. The company brought the critically acclaimed production of David Harrower's Good With People to the Traverse Theatre for the 2012 Edinburgh Festival.

In May 2019, Duff joined the cast of Harry Potter and the Cursed Child in the London West End production, appearing as Professor Minerva McGonagall and the Trolley Witch in the multi award-winning show.

== Personal life ==
Duff is married to former police officer Tom Forrest and became stepmother to his two daughters, Sarah and Katie. She met Forrest, a widower, when she bought her sister's house in Burnside in Rutherglen in 1997 and became his neighbour. They were engaged in October and married on 22 March 1998 at Culzean Castle, Maybole. He left the police force and set up the property company, Blue Door Property.

In Dec 2000, Duff was made a patron of Scottish Youth Theatre, continuing her link with the company having been a student in the '80s, and on the board in the '90s. Scottish Youth Theatre had also provided Blythe with her first professional job in 'The Young Playwright's Festival', a joint production with The Traverse Theatre.

Duff was one of a number of Scottish women who, at an event to publicly recognise the outstanding work of women from across Scotland, received a personal "thank you" from the then Secretary of State for Scotland, Helen Liddell, at Edinburgh Castle on 6 March 2003.

In November 2005 she helped launch ScotsCare, a charity aimed at helping Scottish people living in London who have money or health problems.

She was asked to be an Ambassador of The Prince's Trust, having benefited from the charity in the 1980s. In May 2007, she presented an evening in Holyrood Palace in the presence of HRH The Prince Charles, Duke of Rothesay, to help celebrate the 30th anniversary of the trust.

Blythe was Chieftain of Bute Highland Games in 2009 and Chieftain of the Cowal Games in 2011.

She was given an Honorary Doctorate in June 2011 from Glasgow Caledonian University for her outstanding contribution to the performing arts. and in 2012 was made a Cultural Fellow.

== Credits ==
=== Television ===
- Taggart – Jackie Reid – Scottish Television for ITV (1990–2011)
- "Songs of Praise" (self) Narrator
- "This Morning" (self) 1997, 2008, 2009, 2011.
- "All Star Family Fortunes" (self) 2010
- "Loose Women" (self)
- "GMTV (self)
- "Lorraine Kelly (self)
- Win, Lose or Draw (self) (2004)
- There's Been a Murder: A Celebration of Taggart (self) (2006)
- Taggart: 25 Years of Murder (self) (2008)
- Taggart: 30 Years of Taggart (self) (2013)
- The Bank That Almost Broke Britain – BBC Documentary (2018) (self) Narrator

=== Radio ===
Includes:

- "The Complete Works of Robert Burns" – various poems – BBC Scotland (2009)
- Just a Minute – Radio 4 (1997)
- "The Young Persons Guide to the Orchestra" Narrator – BBC Symphony Orchestra- live BBC Radio 3
- Lady Macbeth of the Mtsensk – Katrina BBC Radio 3
- Morning Story – Iphiginia BBC Radio Scotland
- Blending In – Irene (BBC Radio 3)
- Sheila – title role (BBC Radio Scotland)

=== Theatre ===
Includes:

- "Harry Potter and the Cursed Child" – Minerva McGonnigal/Trolley Witch – Sonia Freidman Productions/London West End (2019)
- "Locker Room Talk" – Traverse Theatre Company – Traverse Theatre/Scottish Parliament (2017/2018)
- "Romeo and Juliet" – Nurse – Shakespeare's Globe(2017)
- "Grain in the Blood" – Mother –Traverse Theatre Company/Tron Theatre Company – Traverse Theatre/Tron Theatre (2016)
- "The James Plays" – Isabella Stewart/Annabella – National Theatre of Scotland – Australia/New Zealand/UK/Canada (2016)
- "Into that Darkness" – Gitta Sereny – Citizens Theatre Company (2015)
- "The James Plays" – Isabella Stewart/Annabella – National Theatre of Scotland/Edinburgh International Festival/National Theatre of Great Britain (2014)
- "Ciara" – Ciara – Traverse Theatre/Datum Point Productions /Traverse Theatre/Citizens Theatre (2013)
- "Iron" – Fay – Firebrand (2013)
- "Good With People" – Helen – Datum Point/Paines Plough/The Traverse – The Traverse Theatre (Festival 2012/New York 2013)
- "Beautiful Burnout" – Carlotta-National Theatre of Scotland/Frantic Assembly – St. Annes Warehouse NYC (2011) Sydney/Perth/Wellington Festival (2012)
- "Just Checking" – Izzy Grant – Datum Point Productions – The Tron Theatre (2010)
- "Good With People" – Helen Hughes – Oran Mor/Paines Plough UK/Irish Tour (2010)
- "Be Near Me" – Mrs Poole – Donmar Warehouse /UK Tour – National Theatre of Scotland (2009)
- "Home, Glasgow" – National Theatre of Scotland (2006)
- "Intolerance" – Ravenhill at Breakfast – The Traverse (2006)
- "Mum's the Word" – Deborah – European Premiere (2002)/Volcanic Production New Zealand (2003)
- "King of the Fields" – Jean – The Traverse (1999)
- "Sharp Shorts" – various – The Traverse (1996)
- "Swing Hammer Swing" – Rhona Clay – The Citizens Theatre (1995)
- "To" – Landlady – Cumbernauld Theatre (1993)
- "Street Scene" – Shirley Kaplan – Scottish Opera/English National Opera (1989)
- "Three Sisters" – Masha – rehearsed reading (Tron Theatre)
- "Tally's Blood" – Lucia – (Traverse Theatre) (1990)
- "Sheila" – Sheila – (Traverse)
- "Checking Out" – Pauline – (Cumbernauld Theatre)
- "Beauty and the Beast" – Hazel – (Royal Lyceum Theatre)
- "Shakers" – Mel (Cumbernauld Theatre) (1987)
- "Beggar's Opera" – Lucy Lockett – Wildcat TC (Lyceum Theatre) (1986)
- "Across The Barricades" – Sadie – TAG Theatre Company (1986)
- "The Lucky Ones" – Debbie – TAG Theatre Company – (1985)
