= St Leonards, East Kilbride =

Area of East Kilbride, Scotland

Coordinates: 55°45′43″N 4°09′12″W

St Leonards is an area of the Scottish new town East Kilbride, in South Lanarkshire.

St Leonards is a residential area on the east side of the town. The majority of the area's streets are named after Glens, Islands, Rivers and Lochs from Scotland, for instance: Loch Shin, Loch Assynt, Glen Carron, Glen Tanner, Inch Murrin, Benbecula and Skye. About 39 streets are named after Glens of Scotland, 20 after Scottish Islands, 12 after Lochs and 7 after Scottish Rivers. St Leonards is well known for its red brick terraced houses in the Calderglen area, which can be seen from St Leonards Road approaching High Common Road.

== Schools ==
Calderglen High School, which opened its new building on 18 February 2008, was formed from the merger of the existing Claremont and Hunter High Schools. The School was opened by Adam Ingram. The school was due for completion in August 2007 but this was delayed, causing the pupils to be housed in the existing Claremont High building. This area also contains Blacklaw Primary School (Opened on May 27, 1969 but rebuilt in 2007), Mount Cameron Primary School - the sole Scottish Gaelic speaking school in East Kilbride at present (redevelopment complete), and St. Hillary's Primary School (redevelopment complete).

== Churches ==
- Claremont Parish Church, a Church of Scotland congregation - established in 1968 and built in 1970.
- St Leonard's Catholic Church - the parish was established in 1966, and built in 1970.

== Politics ==
The area of St Leonards is contained within the East Kilbride East ward of South Lanarkshire Council.

At the recent South Lanarkshire Council election, 3 councillors were elected for the area. These were Scottish National Party (SNP) councillor Gladys Ferguson-Miller, Scottish Green Party councillor Kirsten Robb, and Scottish Labour Party councillor Graham Scott.

The MSP for East Kilbride, and thus, St Leonards, is the SNP's Collette Stevenson. The MP for the area is the Conservatives' Lisa Cameron.

== Recent events ==
The council has been redeveloping the blocks of flats into more attractive, modern looking ones with a new exterior. These are Clyde Tower (the highest tower in East Kilbride at 56m), Calder Tower and White Cart Tower.

Currently, the area has a small shopping centre and a set of small rental units which include a Tesco, pharmacy, petrol station, bookmaker, bakers, cafe, pub, fish and chip shop, library, hairdresser, Indian takeaway and a dentist.
