= The Village, East Kilbride =

Suburb in South Lanarkshire, Scotland

Coordinates: 55°45′54″N 4°10′31″W

'The Village' is the modern but long-established and formal name for the oldest known nucleus of settlement in East Kilbride, South Lanarkshire, Scotland. This 'old town' component was partially preserved and is distinguished in character from the large 'new town' which surrounds it. It serves as the facilities and retail nucleus at the heart of the pre-planned new-town neighbourhood of 'Mains', whose Modernist housing components were developed around the settlement's periphery and partly within it. These modern developments, spread across a broad area, were later distinguished in two halves separated by West Mains Road; West Mains in the west, and East Mains in the east, with most of the old village falling within the latter zone.

The historic core of the old village is designated as a historic and architectural Conservation Area, observed under the planning regulations of South Lanarkshire Council.

== Origins and early history ==
The Village, originally called the 'Kirkton' or 'Kirktoun' of Kilbride, developed many centuries before the area was designated for new town development in the 1940s. The church at the core of East Kilbride Village is first attested in a late twelfth century record whose contents partly pertain to matters in the early twelfth century, in which period the church was possessed 'of old' by the Bishops of Glasgow. A stratum of settlement in the village area before the Middle Ages may be evidenced by the since destroyed large tumulus or cairn of Knocklegoil, which existed at Lymekilns just west of the village, and which may have a Hiberno-Scandinavian association indicated by its place-name reference to the Gall-Ghàidheil. Occupation of some form during the Romano-British period may be evidenced by the discovery in circa 1900 of a Roman-style oil lamp found during ground works on the lands of Bosfield.

Some level of early proto-urban growth is evidenced by the various trades like innkeepers, weavers, fleshers, traders, blacksmiths, wrights, legal writers, masons and more, that are testified in 'Kirkton of Kilbride' by early seventeenth century conveyancing records. However, the church of Kilbride certainly served the inhabitants of the wider rural parish using a dedicated vicar for the 'cure of souls', at least as early as 1417 AD. (Note: This early sense of a parish need not have comprehended a village beside the church in that period, but a kirk attracting such footfall from a wider parish created a certain impetus, indeed need for urban growth, because the church was the only common meeting point for potential trade, legal meetings and socialising between parishioners.)

Certainly by the late-18th century, the Kirkton of Kilbride consisted principally of 71 dwelling houses, forming one chief street and two lanes, inhabited by 167 families that comprised 524 people in total. Historical accounts and maps indicate that the 'one chief street' referred to was the combined axes of what would become Glebe, Montgomery and Parkhall Streets', while the two lanes represented a short urbanised stretch of Maxwellton Road (village end of what is now Maxwell Drive), and the western end of what would become Kittoch Street.

By the Victorian era, the main thoroughfares of the village had been formed much as they exist today: Kittoch Street, Parkhall Street, Main Street, Montgomery Street, Hunter Street, Glasgow Road/Kirkton Avenue (Old Coach Road), Stuart Street, Maxwell Street (Maxwell Drive), and Glebe Street. Although, these streets did not have their names assigned until the early 1900s.

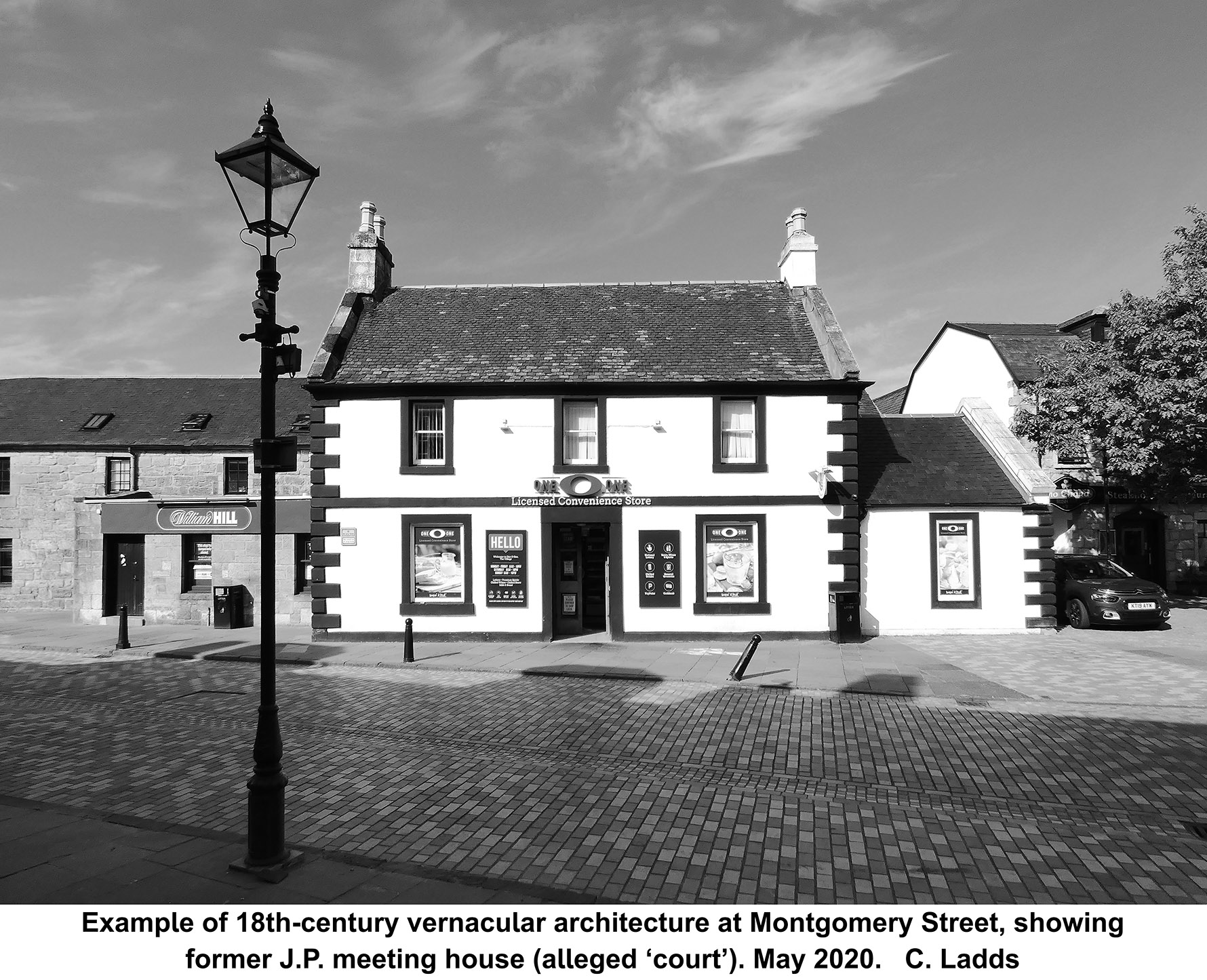
Example of late-18th century vernacular architecture on Montgomery Street, showing former J.P. Meeting House (alleged 'court'). May 2020. C. Ladds

== Landed estate identity ==
Most of the village or Kirkton of Kilbride fell within the small estate of Kirkton, later called Kirktonholm after its mansion seat, which occupied a holmland by the Kittoch Water adjacent to what is now Kirktonholm Park. The estate was originally a secular possession of the Church of Glasgow in their role as landlords, and it contributed to the support of the Chantors of Glasgow who resided in Kilbride from time to time. The estate was later sold, passing through several families before becoming the property of a branch of the Montgomerie family.

Some later 18th and 19th century annexes to the north, originally called Stewarton or the Newton of Kilbride, fell within the western part of the territory of Bosfield rather than Kirkton, whereas some of the Markethill and Graham Avenue properties occupied a portion of the territory of Lymekilns.

The small estate of Kirkton, under the Montgomeries, and inclusive of the village, was elevated to Burgh of Barony status by a royal charter granted by William III in 1702 (commonly misquoted as a charter of Queen Anne). This granted the right to hold markets and seasonal fairs, which further facilitated urbanisation of the village area. However, this should not be confused with the universal rights to hold common markets and fairs on the former Commonty, which was attached to the Kirkton of Kilbride.

== Early Modern development ==
Further urban growth and the rise of public utilities were catalysed in the late 1700s by the advent of a turnpike road system to the parish, and the subsequent arrival of the railway to the village in 1868.

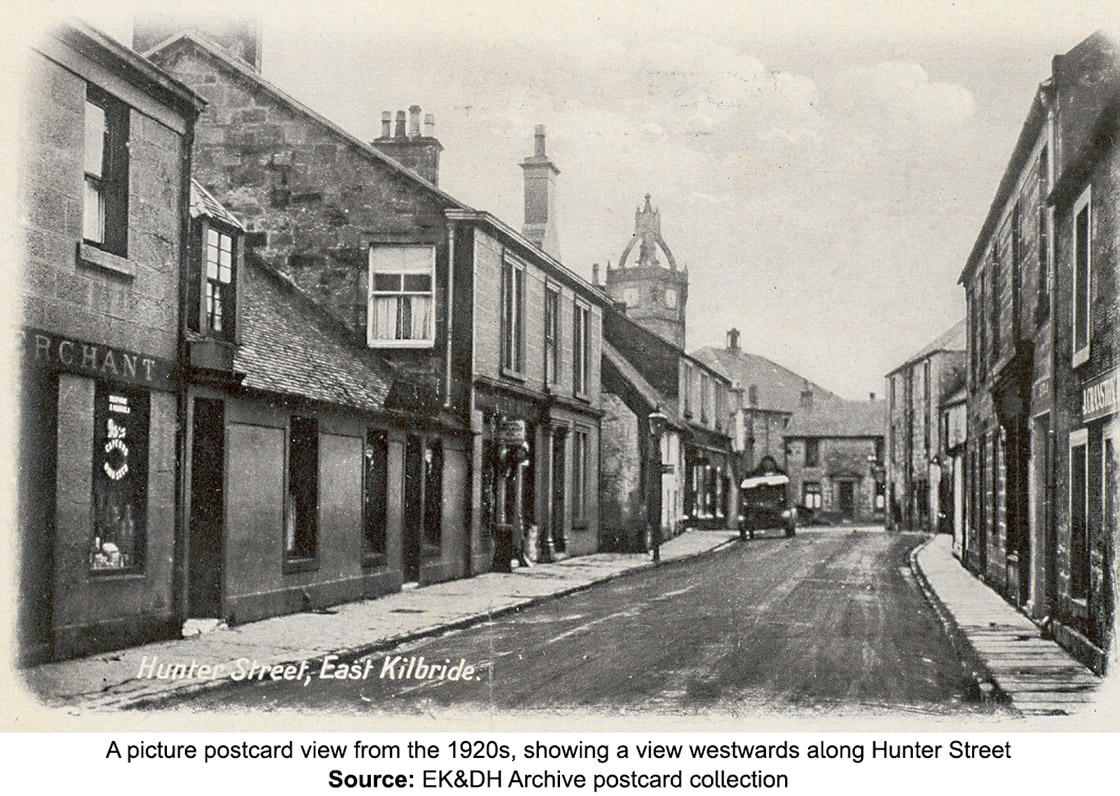
Picture postcard view from the 1920s, showing a view westwards along Hunter Street, East Kilbride Village (EK&DH Archive) Supplied via C. Ladds

As stated, the street names of the main thoroughfares were mostly assigned in the early 1900s. Their etymologies are as follows:

Auldhouse Road (later Brouster Hill): This road connected Kilbride village with Auldhouse hamlet in a more southerly part of the parish.

Glebe Street: From the glebe lands of the parish church, which this road led to.

Hunter Street: After the important medical pioneers born in the parish - Drs William and John Hunter.

Kittoch Street: After the close-by Kittoch Water (a small river)

Main Street: A later designation for the inner village urbanised portion of the Glasgow to Muirkirk Turnpike, which became the principle urban thoroughfare which attracted this moniker. An earlier name for part of this section was New Line, representing the new line of buildings erected along it.

Markethill Road: After the hill summit a short distance north of the village, which the road passes, where temporary markets were held during plagues in past centuries, to help prevent inter-urban transmission.

Maxwell Street / Maxwell Road: After its older name Maxwellton Road, both being references to the Maxwells of Calderwood, whose estate this road led through.

Montgomery Street: After the hereditary proprietors of much of the estate of Kirkton - The Montgomeries of Kirktonholm.

Glasgow Road / Kirkton Avenue / Old Coach Road: Originally the late-18th century Turnpike road connecting Glasgow with Muirkirk via Kilbride, and later urbanised near the village to create Kirkton Avenue - nod to the Kirkton of Kilbride. New Town development led to truncation and adoption of the conveyancing moniker 'the coach road' as Old Coach Road.

Graham Avenue: After the proprietors of most of that area, the Grahams of Lymekilns.

Parkhall Street: After the small territory of Parkhall which may have been a portion of the western half of the lands of Bosfield and possibly a part of Kirkton. The name refers to the park (field) of or associated with a haughland, possibly those in the vicinity of Kirktonholm.

Stuart Street: After the Stuarts of Torrance, key proprietors of large areas in the parish and village vicinity.

To these were later added the other main streets of:

Cunninghame Road: After the double-barrel component in the name Montgomerie-Cunninghame, the name of the former long-established landlords of the estate of Kirkton (Kirktonholm), through whose lands this street was laid.

Harrington Road: After the 'Harington' family that married into the Stuarts of Torrance, creating the well-known local laird and figure of local affairs, Col. Robert Edward Stuart Harington-Stuart (1834-1911).

Kirktonholme Road: The name of the former long-established estate of Kirktonholm, through whose lands this street was laid.

Old Mill Road: After an old steam-powered cement mill that operated by what became Main Street.

Torrance Road: After the historic East Kilbride estate of Torrance.

Other smaller but historically attested roads and residential designation in the village area are/were:

Barr Terrace: After a former prominent parish and county councillor, Mr Barr.

Creighton Grove: After a nineteenth century local schoolmaster, William Creighton.

Kirk Wynd: The angled connecting portion of Strait Dykes with Montgomery Street, named after the adjoining Kirk of Kilbride.

Parkview: This name has latterly applied to the Parkview Tenement there. Rather than a reference to the nearby Showpark, is apparently a reference to a small park acreage in the vicinity which once belonged to the Pomphrey family.

School Lane (destroyed): A former small connecting lane from Parkhall Street to Main Street, which facilitated access to the since demolished Village School.

St. Bryde Street: After the traditional saintly association of Kilbride (Church/Cell of Bride/Bridget).

Strait Dykes: The now pedestrian lane connecting West Mains Road with Kirk Wynd at Montgomery Street. Somewhat contested, but may refer to an enclosed area running between dykes (walls) to create a 'street', although it may be a Scots reference to the straight character of some dykes in that area.

Torrance Square: After the Stuart of Torrance who established this as residential accommodation of workers of the Torrance Cotton-spinning mill there, which later became the Torrance Inn and then the Torrance Hotel. The residential quarters remained as housing for a prolonged through this period of change.

Wardrope Place: After the Wardrope family which historically owned a portion of the western half of the territory of Bosfield, where the street now stands.

Wheatsheaf Pend: A long established route, although the age of the assigned name is uncertain. Borrowed from the former Wheatsheaf Inn, whose building is passes.

Notes - Cross Wynd, Montgomery Wynd and New Line Pend, are modern names that partly nod to older associated place-names. Cross Wynd refers to the nearby Village Cross at Maxwell Drive and Main, Hunter, Stuart Streets. New Line Pend refers to an older name for part of Main Street. Other small, historically attested named streets existed in the village area which were never mapped owing to their small scale. These are not included here.

== Principle landmarks ==
The Montgomerie Arms public house, originally called the Montgomery Arms Inn, Montgomery Arms Hotel, or more colloquially as the 'Heid Inn', dates back to 1719, or it was built very shortly after that time. Long uncorrected folklore has since mythologised its origins back to the 1650s, based on spurious misrepresentation of earlier property deed information, partly to promote an olde worlde charm in the 1950s-60s. This assertion still permeates some locally produced and official research resources, mostly through cyclic quotation.

The 'Loupin'-on-Stane', a vernacular stone mounting block, stands outside the front of the inn. This was used originally by inn patrons to mount their horses. The mounting block is believed to be contemporary with the inn.

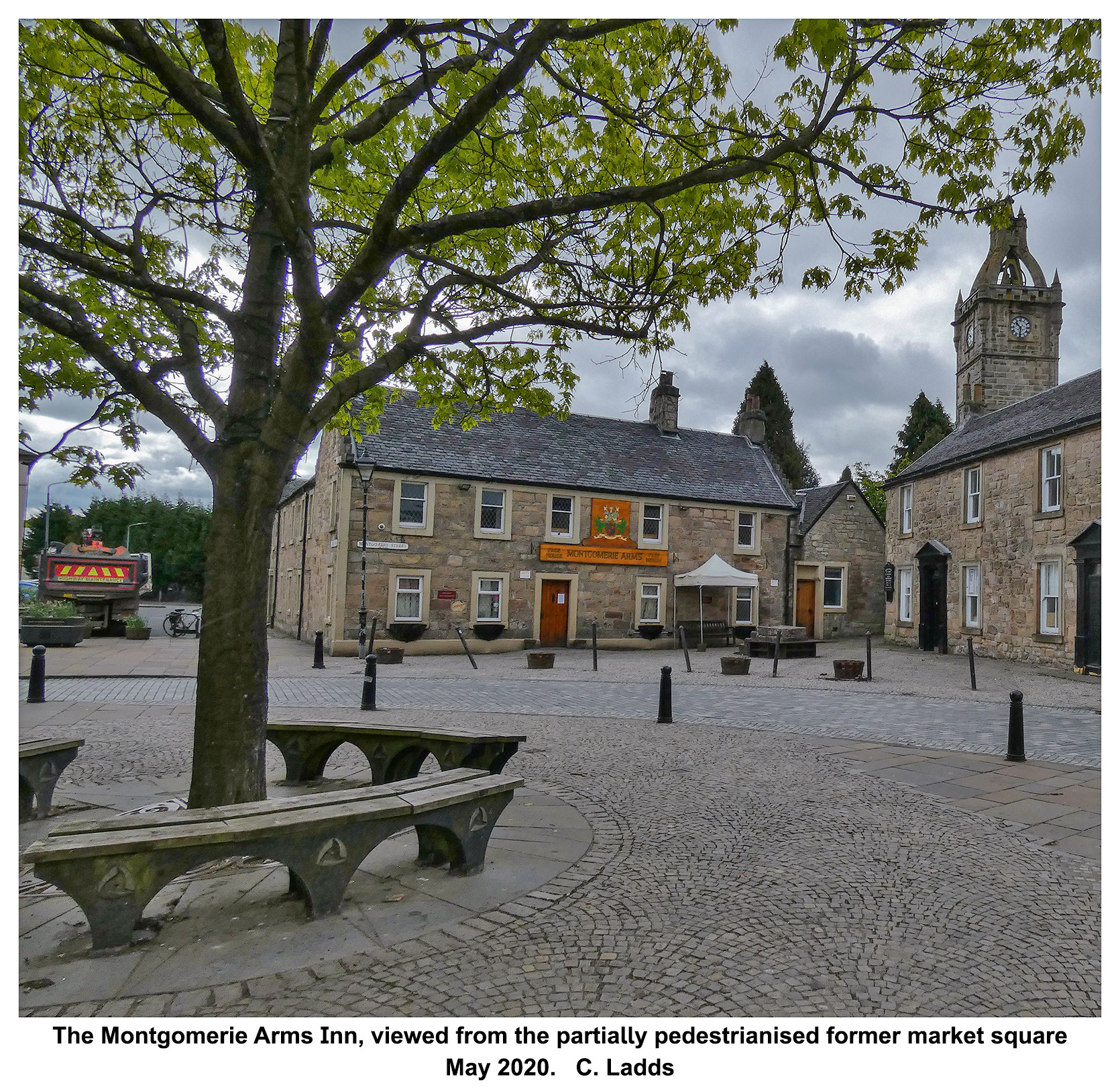
View from Neo Celtic public art benches at Montgomery Street, towards Montgomerie Arms Inn - May 2020

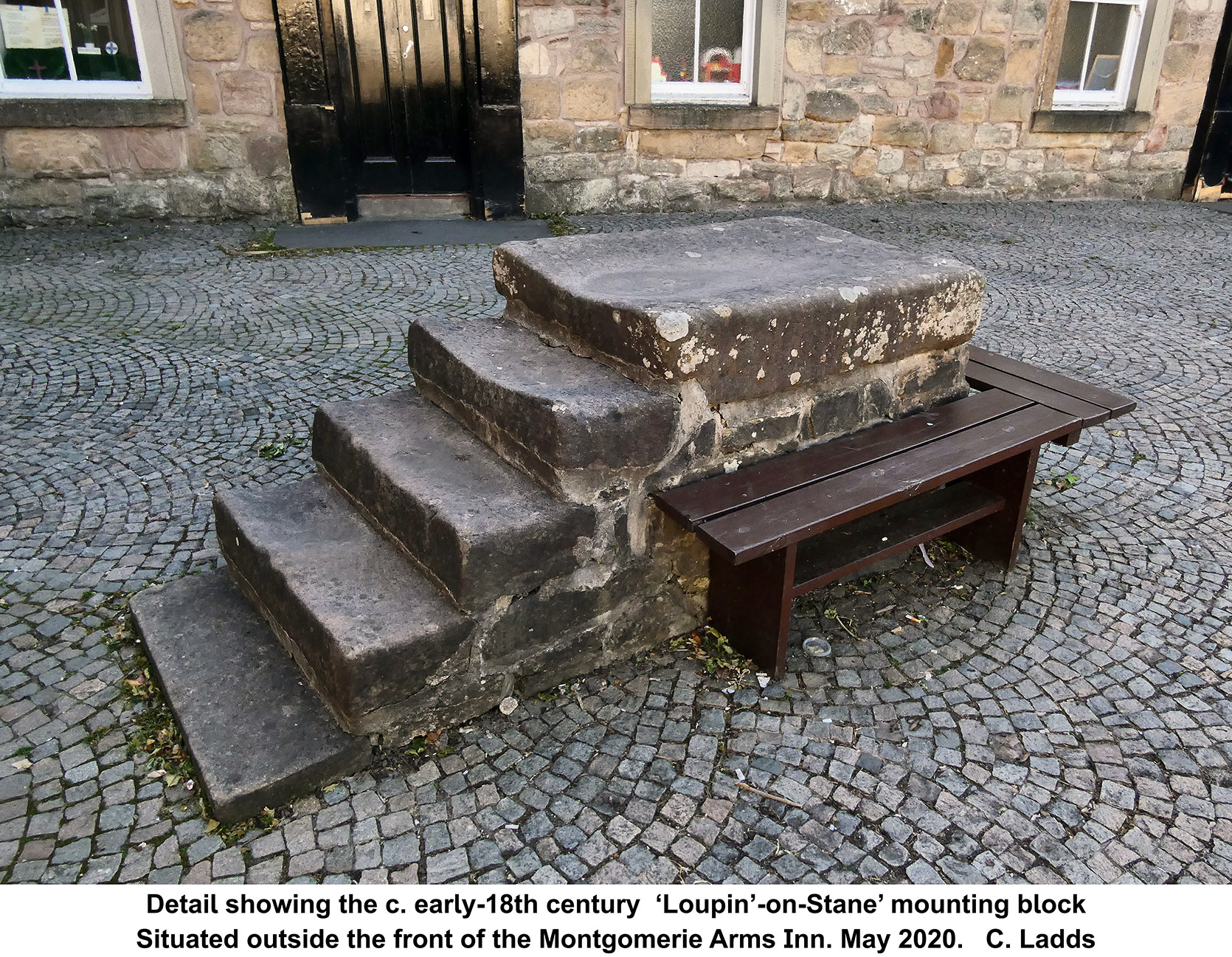
Detail of the early-18th century 'Loupin'-on-Stane' mounting block, situated outside the front of the Montgomerie Arms Inn. May 2020. C. Ladds

East Kilbride Kirk, latterly East Kilbride Old Parish Church, is a Church of Scotland edifice which forms the centrepiece and historic core of the Kirkton of Kilbride. The church building, which remains active with a congregation and minister, closely occupies the site of several former iterations of the building, including the Medieval church dedicated to St Bride - generally associated with Brigid of Kildare.

The building includes an example of a Scotch Crown Belfry, which can be seen from considerable distances within the surrounding townscape.

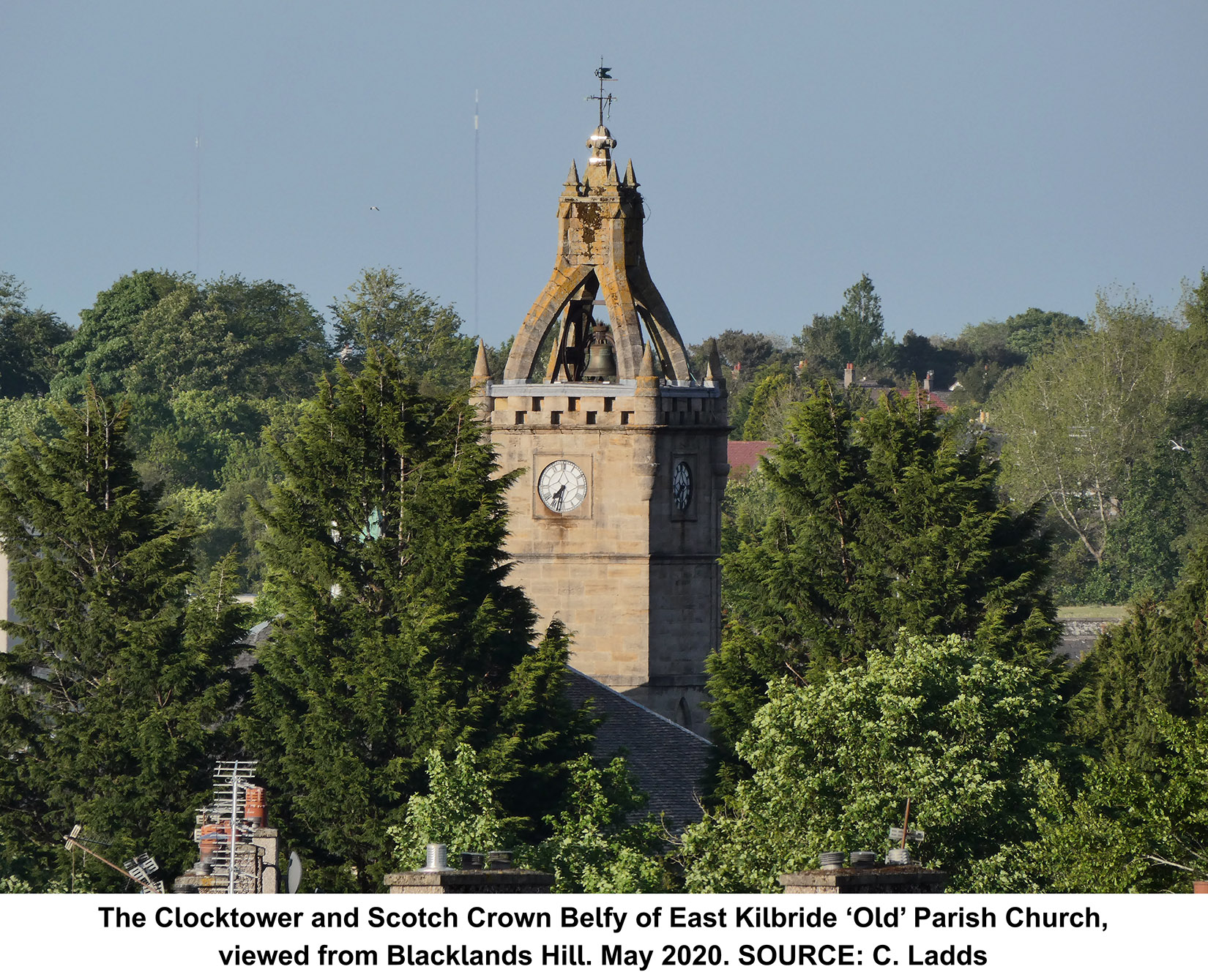
The Clocktower and Scotch Crown Belfry of East Kilbride 'Old' Parish Church, as viewed from Blacklands Hill. May 2020. C. Ladds

Surrounding the building is the historic Kirkyard of Kilbride, whose interments include the parents of the 18th century medical pioneers, Drs William and John Hunter, and the Rev. James French, who was a childhood tutor of Sir Walter Scott as well as a local minister. A prominent building in the kirkyard is the Neoclassical or early Georgian style mausoleum or crypt house, of the Stuarts of Torrance. Also interred in the kirkyard, albeit with now unmarked graves, is the Shoemakers' poet John Struthers, author of the Poor Man's Sabbath, and William Watt, the author of a leading Scottish folk song 'Kate Dalrymple'.

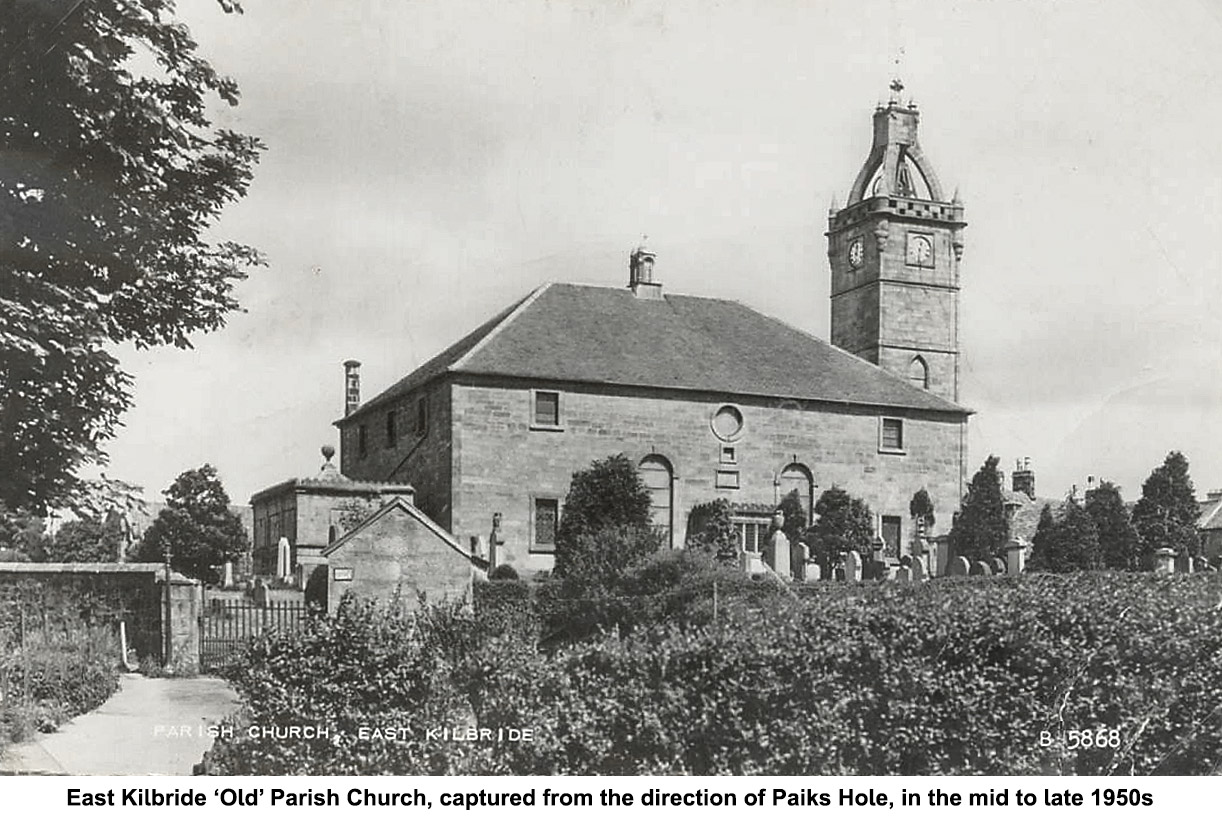
Circa 1958 - View of East Kilbride 'Old' Parish Church, captured from the vicinity of Paiks Hole on the Kittoch Water

The West Kirk, previously the United Presbyterian Church of Kilbride, is situated at the southern end of Kittoch Street and represents the earliest en masse breakaway congregation from the established Church of Kilbride. It formed in the late-18th century, originally meeting in an improvised tent (meeting house) by the Kittoch Water until a permanent church building could be constructed in the 1790s (completed in 1791). This building, in a restrained Georgian and vernacular style, persists to this day, with some later additions.

The Torrance Hotel, situated between Parkhall and Main Streets, began life as a cotton spinning mill and workers' accommodation under the Stuarts of Torrance in the late-18th century. Following the mill's relocation to Newhousemill, part of the buildings eventually became a large inn, the Torrance Inn, and ultimately a hotel, which persists to the present day, albeit in a much augmented form.

The Village Public Hall on Maxwell Street, latterly Maxwell Drive, was built in 1882-1883 and opened in 1883. This provided the main indoor civic meeting and entertainments space; a long-felt absence in the village area. This building was partially demolished, consolidated and extended to create East Kilbride Village Theatre, which opened with preview performances in late 1977, opened for general public use shortly after, and was then opened 'officially' in a civic ceremony in September 1978.

East Kilbride Arts Centre is a multi-function building featuring studio, gallery, teaching, meeting and performance spaces, all representing a 1990s redevelopment and extension of the Council-owned Bosfield House. Although principally associated with the Village proper, the building technically sits within a late-1800s residential suburb of it upon the lands of Bosfield. The facility includes a hybrid bar-café and areas of semi-formal gardens featuring art installations. The Arts Centre opened in 1994.

The Glebe Memorial Garden, often called the Kirkton Park Memorial Garden or Priestknowe Garden, is a small area of public concourse and landscaping laid out in flowerbeds, seating benches, ornamental trees, and several memorials and sculptures. The most prominent piece is the Hunter Memorial, dedicated to the legacy of the 18th-century medical pioneers Drs William and John Hunter, who hailed from the parish. This sculpture, completed by Benno Schotz in 1937, was relocated from the Laigh Common Park to its present site by the EK Dev. Corp. in 1958.

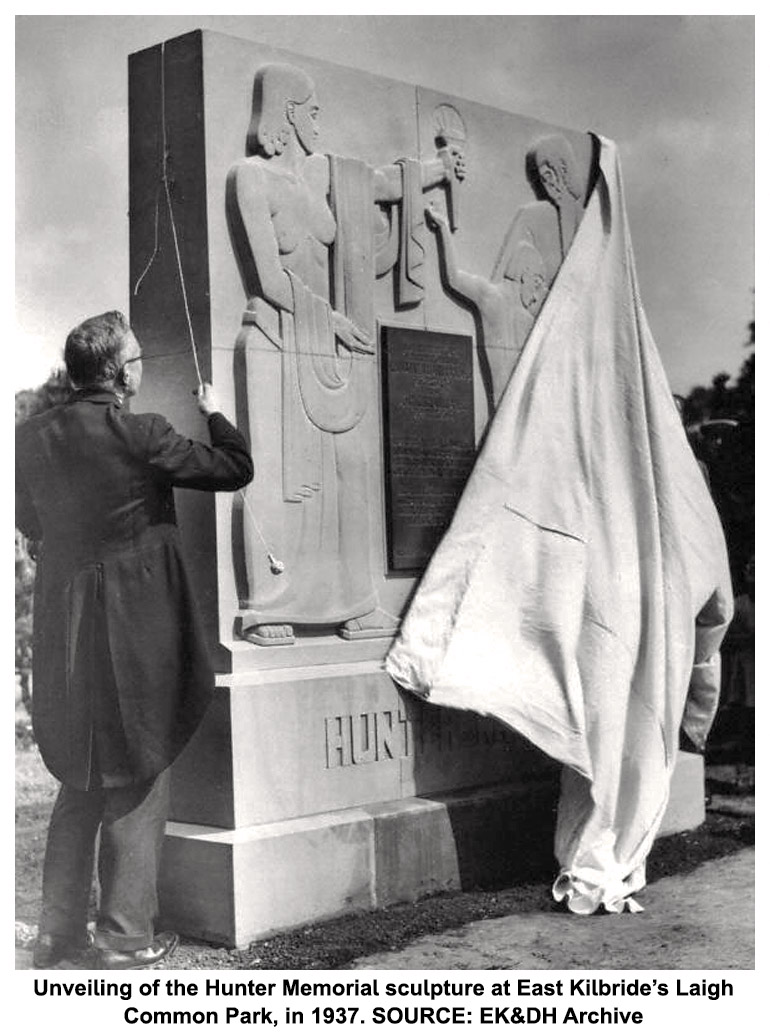
The unveiling by Sir J. W. Hetherington, of the Hunter Memorial at Laigh Common Park on 28 July 1937

Other important memorials in the garden are those which commemorate the fallen of the Udston Colliery Disaster, and a memorial dedicated in 2002 to the East Kilbride covenanters who lost their lives during the Killing Times.

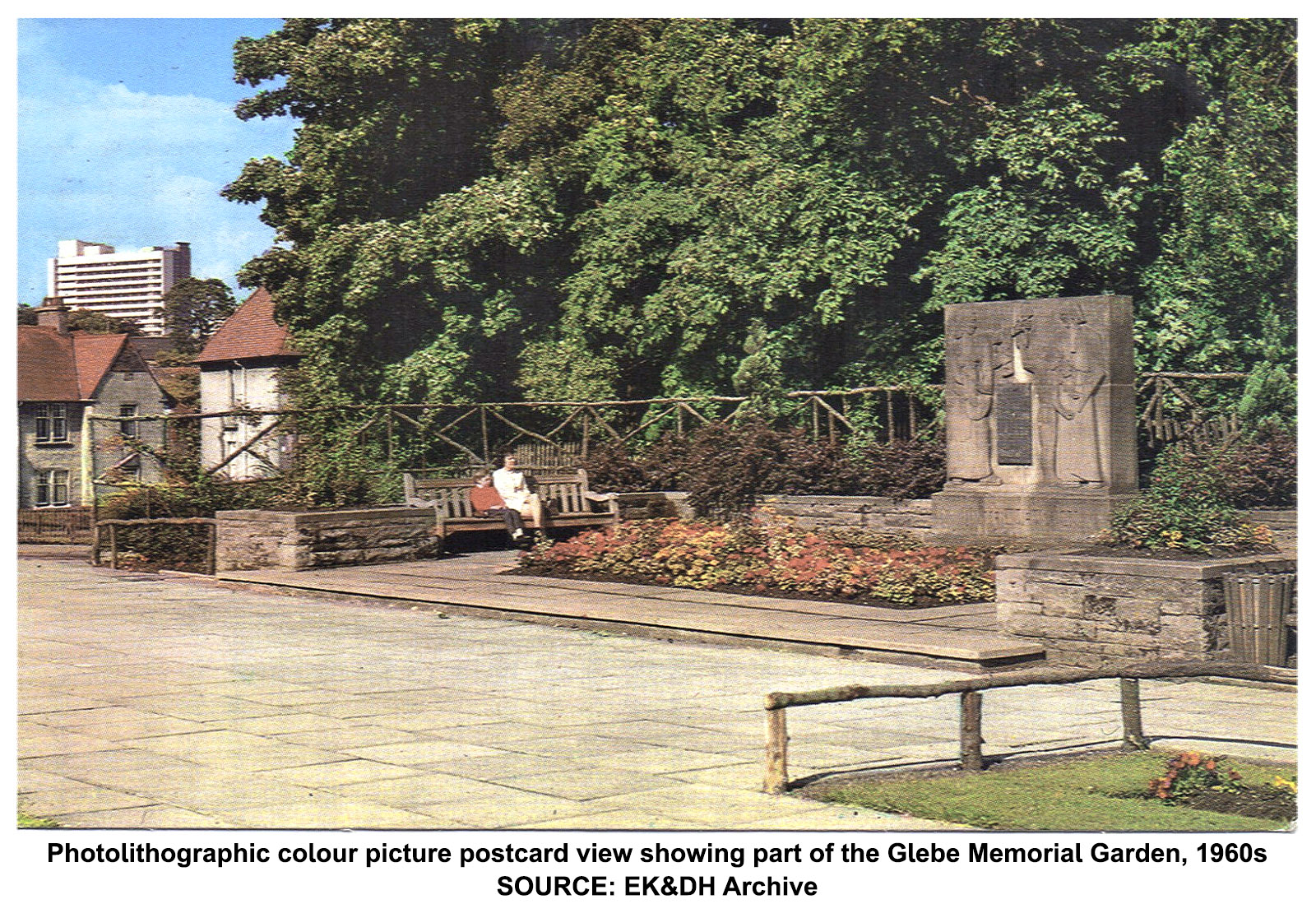
Photolithographic colour print postcard view from the 1960s, showing the Glebe Memorial Garden

Kirktonholm Public Park (alias Kirktonholme Park) appends the western side of the Village, where it is also skirted by a 1920s County Council housing scheme and parts of 1950s West Mains. This park opened in 1926 and was added to with pavilions and public toilets in later years. The park mostly comprises amenity grasslands, play parks, a periphery of mature parkland trees, some flowerbeds, and a wild, exposed section of the Kittoch Water.

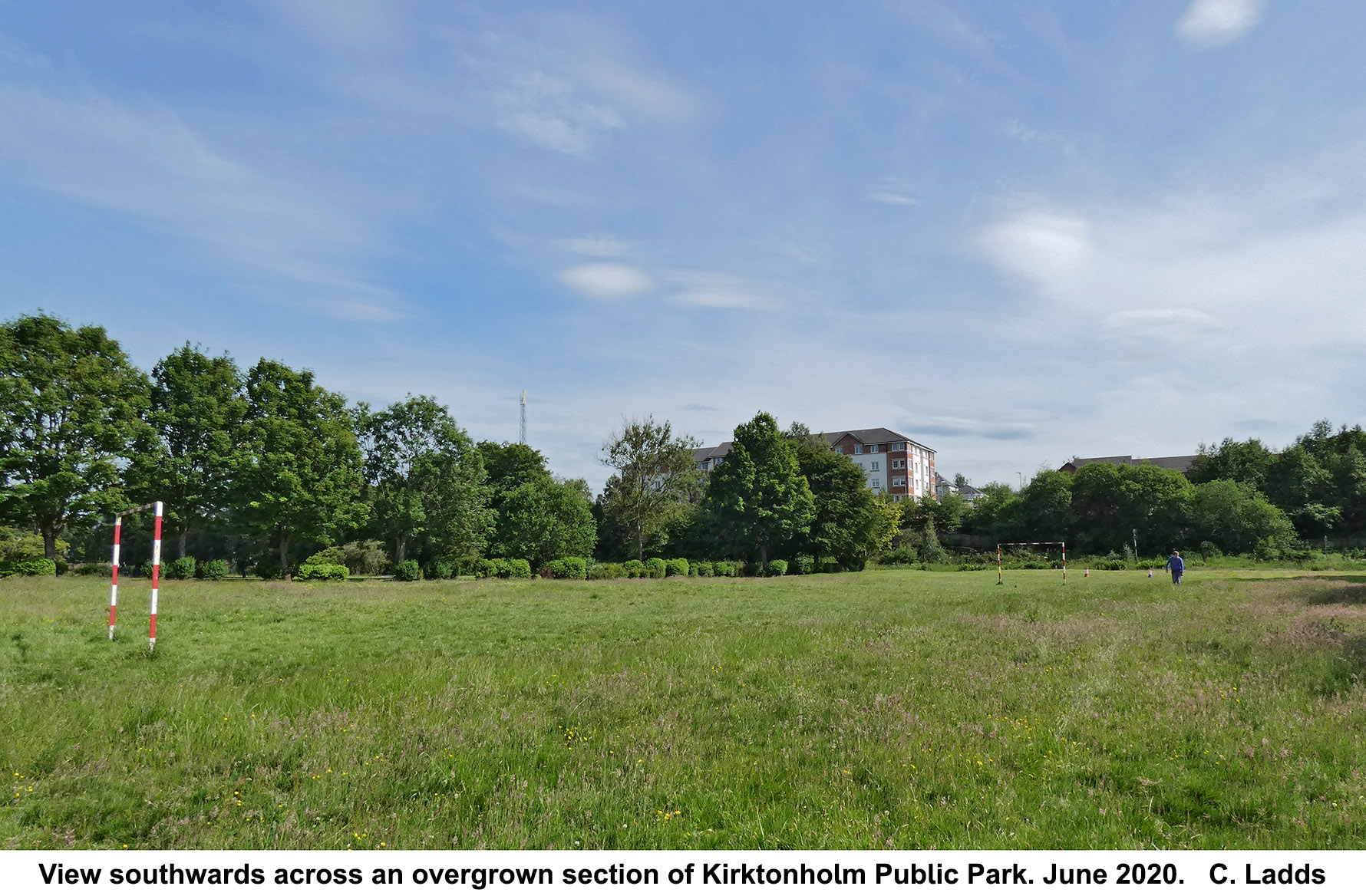
View southwards across an overgrown section of Kirktonholm Public Park. June 2020. C. Ladds

A flattened area of football pitches in the park was more recently upgraded and sectioned off for private use by a local, private football club. The land which the park occupies once formed part of the parkland and grazing policies of Kirktonholm House, which once stood near the eastern end of the area.

East Kilbride War Memorial and its associated park, are situated north of the western end of Graham Avenue - an 1800s suburban addition to the Village built upon part of the estate of Lymekilns. In February through to April 1919 the Parish Council of East Kilbride held meetings on the subject of erecting a War Memorial to the fallen of The Great War from East Kilbride Parish. The decision to go ahead was made in May 1919. Early in 1920 the Graham family of Lymekilns gifted land for use as a War Memorial, and this Deed of Gift was later augmented in September 1920. This civic endeavour included the creation of a stone sculpture in the form of a Neo-Celtic cross, set upon a three layer plinth, itself surmounted upon a mortared cairn of boulders inset with inscribed plaques. The cost was paid for by public subscription.

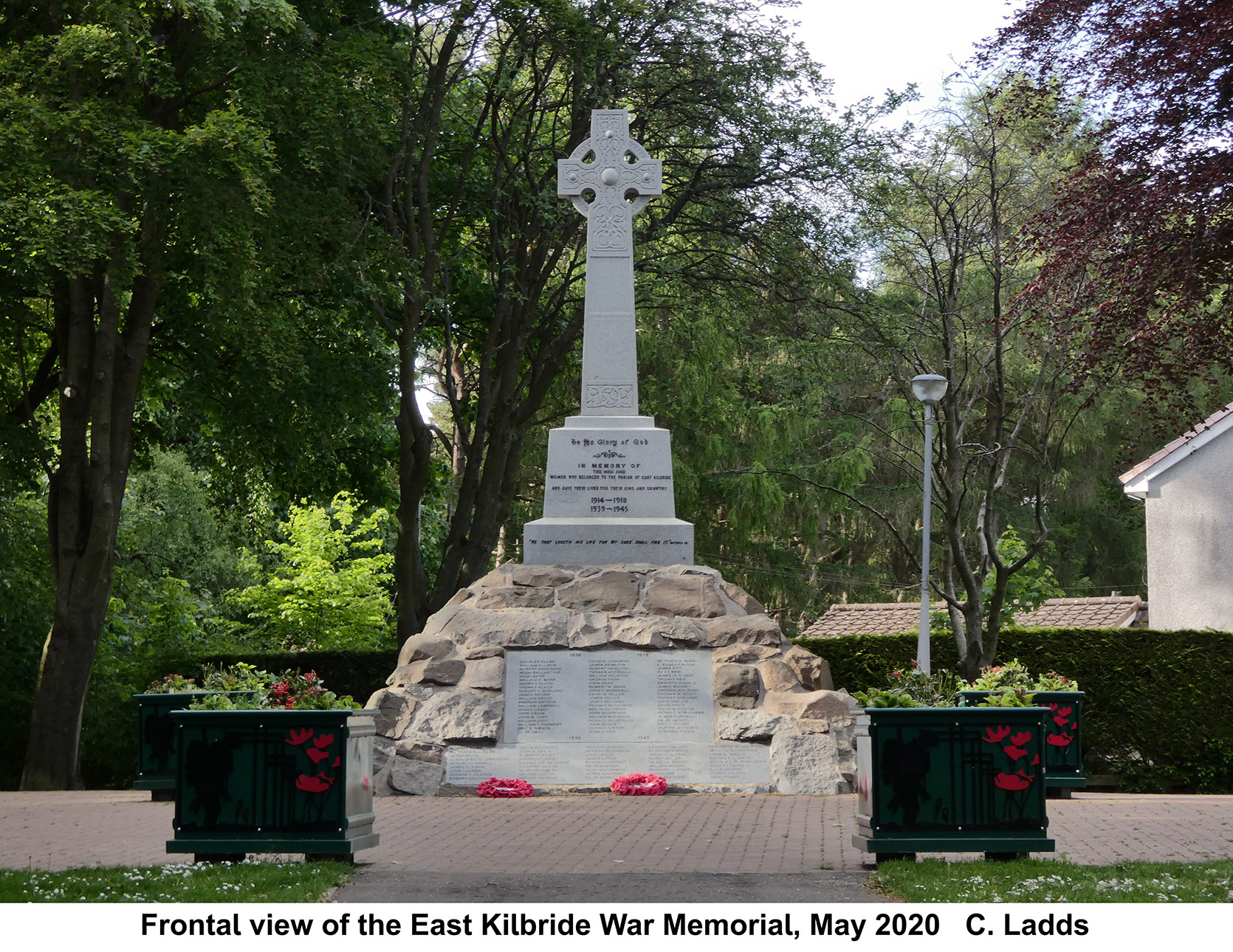
Frontal view of East Kilbride Parish War Memorial, May 2020. C. Ladds

The sculpture was created by the local monumental stonemason, Mr D. A. Robertson. The monument was inscribed upon its ground level plinth with the names of the fallen and it was unveiled as part of a sequence of public events which took place on 01 May 1921 (not April as some erroneous local history books claim and repeat). The parkland of nearly two acres adjoining the memorial was bare at the time of the memorial's unveiling, but was gradually added to in the years that followed with specimen trees, flowerbeds, and rustic boundary walling along the southern side. The process of landscaping was generally complete by the later 1920s. The memorial was updated in around the 1950s to include the names of the fallen from East Kilbride during the Second World War.

The former 'Village Manse', now known as Welbeck House, is located at the eastern end of the Village where it originally adjoined the parish Glebe (redeveloped for road infrastructure in the 1950s-60s). The building is situated between Stuart Street and Glebe Street. The manse replaced a predecessor located elsewhere in the village, although not Brousterland House, as mistakenly stated in some sources such as listed building entries. The new manse was built in 1836-1837 and completed around the latter year, to house Sir Henry Wellwood Moncreiff, the parish minister at that time.

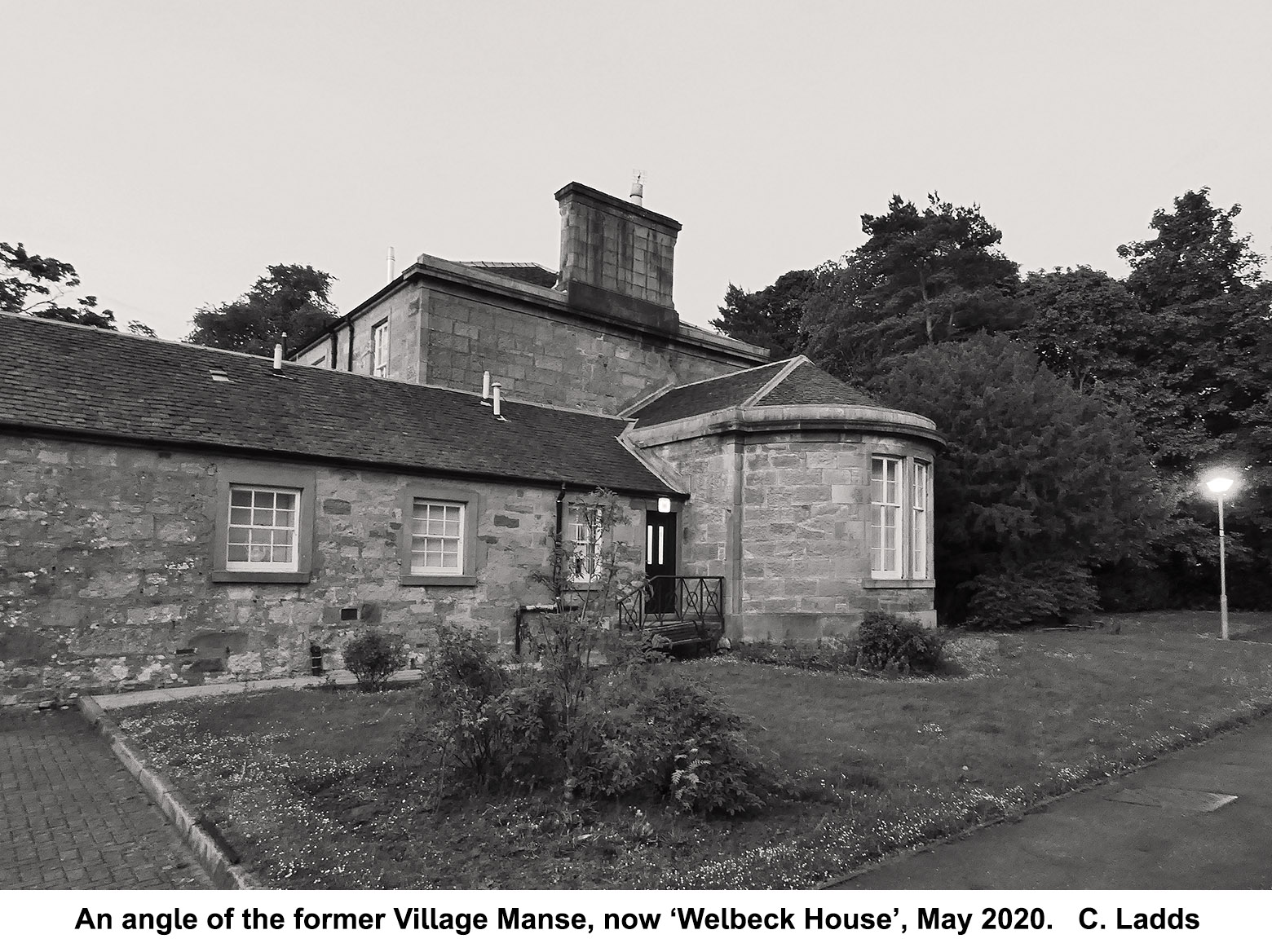
An angle of the former Village Manse, now 'Welbeck House', May 2020. C. Ladds

In the mid-1980s, the building along with its Mews cottages, were redeveloped by the firm Whatlings to create a residential complex of sheltered housing and flats. The name Welbeck House is not pre-existing but was instead imported by the developer, which also gave the same name to a contemporaneous residential development they carried out in Troon.

Note - This building should not be confused with the former Moncreiff Manse, which was associated with the East Kilbride Free Church, later the Moncreiff Church, which was first administered by the same minister following the Disruption of 1843.

The 'Stone Man' situated at Laigh Markethill Cottage (on the north side of the Village area), is a depiction of the Scottish novelist Sir Walter Scott, and was modelled on a more famous sculptural depiction of that figure. Traditional and historical accounts firmly established its attribution to a William Arneil from Eaglesham, who created it in the late-19th century, although the date of execution is uncertain. An earlier proprietor acquired the piece and had it erected in the front garden there ahead of the centenary of the novelist's birth. Despite the particulars, recorded in a number of independent accounts over several decades, it is still common to find mistaken and quite spurious attributions amongst seemingly authoritative material, such as the listed building designation maintained by Historic Environment Scotland. This attributes the piece to the monumental stonemason Robertson, whose local funerary style is quite distinctive, and whose floruit and general presence in the area occurred significantly after the period in which the piece appeared at Laigh Markethill.

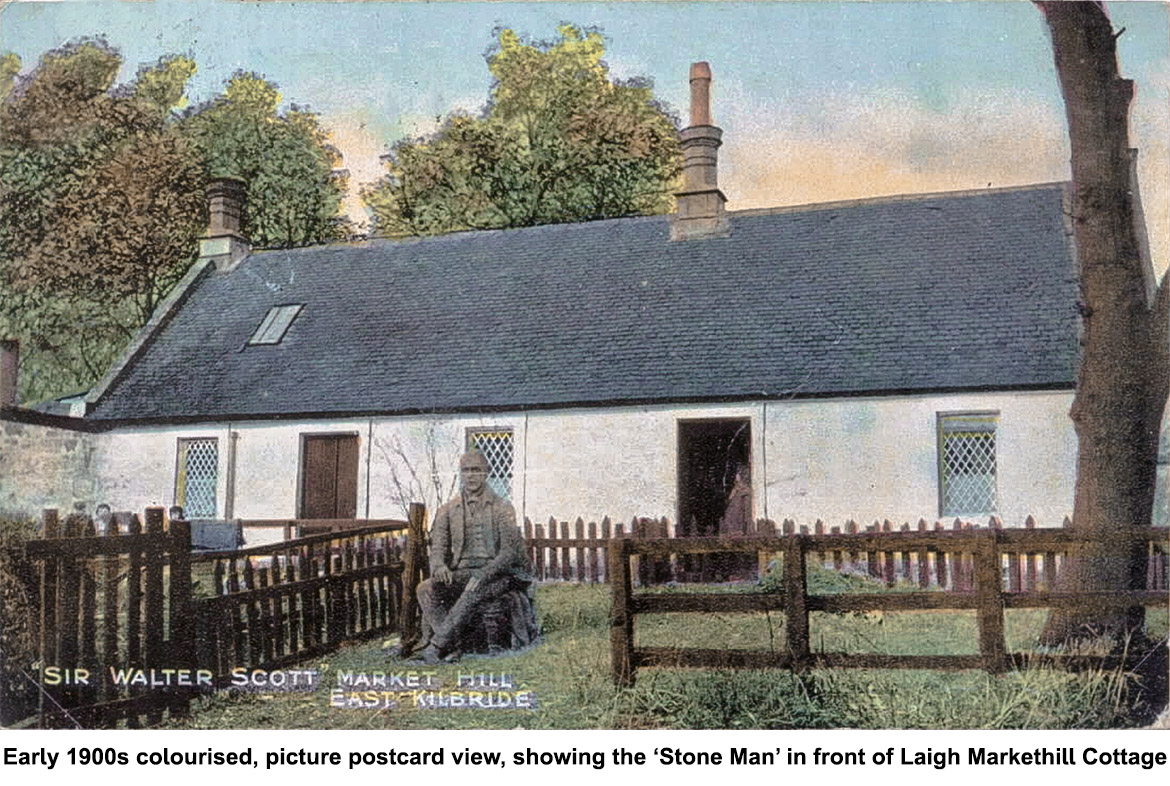
An early 1900s colourised, picture postcard view, showing the 'Stone Man' in front of Laigh Markethill Cottage

With some parts dating to the 1730s in its present form, the house of Brousterland is the oldest domestic building in the Village proper, being located on its southern side beside the Auldhouse Road (now a truncated section called Brouster Hill). This building accommodated the Smiths and several other families, and served for a time as the parish manse. It is a plain, vernacular harled mansion with crow-stepped gables and later additions.

Parish Chambers: The East Kilbride Parish Council had purpose-built and branded accommodation established for their offices on Main Street. This takes the form of an imposing sandstone villa completed in 1913, with a carved stone plaque above the door reading 'Parish Council Chambers 1913'. It had long been a private house.

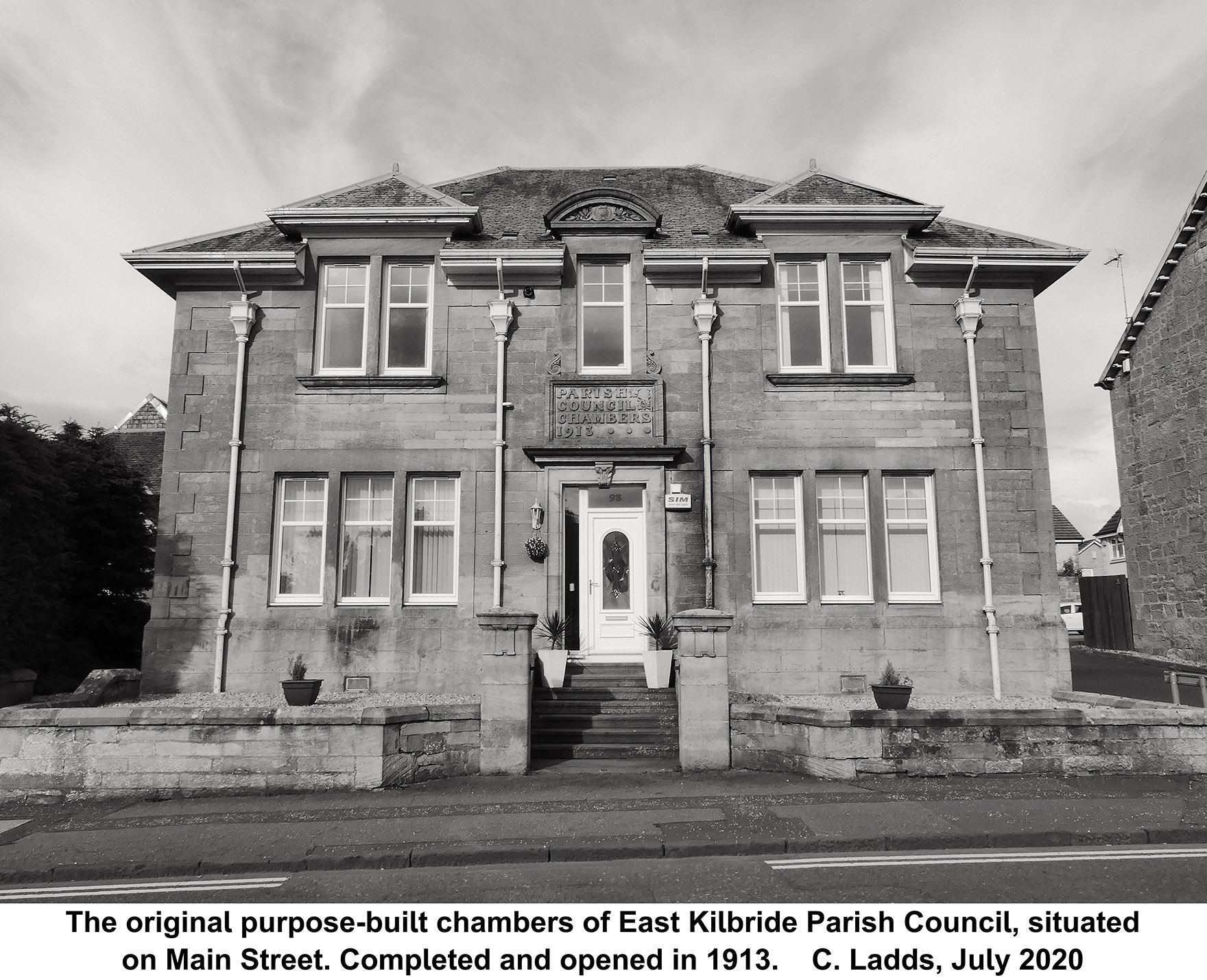
Frontal elevation of the former Parish Council Chambers on Main Street, opened in 1913. C. Ladds, July 2020

== The Show Park and Open Cattle Show ==
The Show Park is a privately-owned public park located on the eastern outskirts of the village area. This large area of hilly and flat amenity grassland has been variously known as the Show Ground or Showfield. Until recently, it was the traditional site of the renowned East Kilbride Open Cattle Shows, that had taken place there with few breaks since the 19th century. The area's traditional place-name was the Westbog or Westboag Park, and this appears to have formed part of the estate of Kirkton and/or some lands of Bosfield.

Its use for cattle shows lasted until the show's relocation to West Nerston during the COVID Pandemic, and this remains an ongoing arrangement. Despite its ownership by the East Kilbride Farmers' Society, a longstanding municipal agreement as well as more recent land reform legislation, mean the space is publicly accessible and used as a public park and place for seasonal entertainments such as circus shows, and it is designated a priority area of greenspace by South Lanarkshire Council.

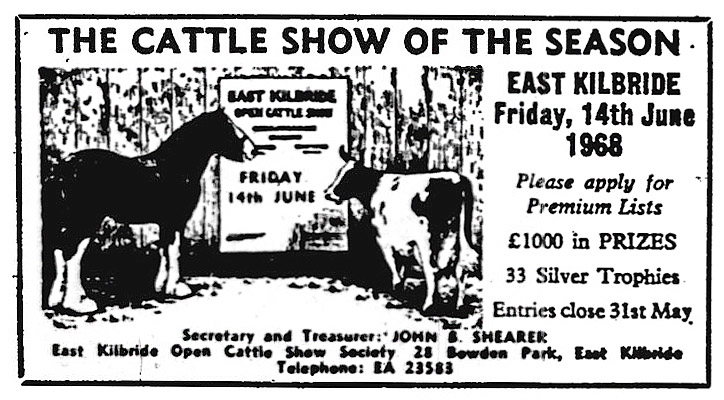
1968 - Advertisement for the East Kilbride Open Cattle Show, at the Show Park

In its mid-2010s supplementary planning guidance governing the treatment of greenspaces, the local authority describes the Show Park on the following terms: "The Show Park meets the primary function of a public park and garden by providing an area of informal activity or relaxtion, social and community purposes".

East Kilbride Thistle F.C.'s home ground and social club is located at the western side of the Show Park.

=== Open Cattle Show origins and folklore ===
Although more popularly accessible folklore tends to date the origins of the open cattle show to the year 1772, it is certain that its organisers, the East Kilbride Farmers' Society, was constituted in 1816 and held its first ever show competition at Laigh Common in the following year. The 1772 date has its sole origin in mythologisation by an earlier key society member, the solicitor W. Strang of Bosfield, who in 1915, just ahead of the anticipated centenary of the society, made a bid to re-affirm the notion of the Kilbride Show as the oldest in Scotland. He conflated information of an earlier Kilbride farmer's philanthropic society recorded in the 1793 book by D. Ure, with a vague entry in the show society's account books concerning a donation of £8, 17s, 10d made to them on or just before 30 December 1816, from an earlier unnamed society.

The 1770s farmers' society, recorded in some detail by D. Ure, only lasted until 1786, when it folded under great contention among its membership. This was thirty years before the East Kilbride Farmers' Society formed in 1816. Crucially, this earlier society, formed to aid destitute farmers facing famine, never held shows, and was limited to the sale of some livestock at common markets of Burgh of Barony fairs - something commonplace across Scotland and not linked to competitive shows or festivity. The residual funds of this early agricultural society were divided amongst its membership, then comprising about 25 farmers, and so this balance was certainly not retained or given to any future society 30 years later. The donation from an earlier society, misrepresented by W. Strang in 1915 as deriving from a non-existent farmers' society, in fact came from the East Kilbride Militia Society, which folded in 1816. At that time, its chairperson Orlando Strang of Arrotshole, seeking to transfer its treasury balance of £8, 17s, 10d to a local worthy cause, gifted it to the new Farmers' Society, which Orlando also happened to be a prominent founding member of.

The inaugural show of the society - a 'Show of Cattle at East Kilbride' - was held at Laigh Common in 1817, and was scheduled to closely coincide with the local Burgh of Barony Sheep Friday fair - a timing which helped ensure sufficient outside footfall to generate interest and greater revenue. There has been a tendency, in local press and similar, to conflate the pre-1816 history of the Society, then quite non-existent, with these barony and common fairs in order to claim a more antique heritage; something patently false. Despite facts and contemporary records surrounding the authentic history of the Open Cattle Show, it is still common to encounter fallacious references to the year 1772 in some key works, including modern articles of the East Kilbride News, or prominent content within the posthumous edited parish history by T. E. Niven from 1965.

== Modern retail & village environment ==
Of a more traditional character in comparison to the modern facilities in 'the town centre' area, the Village hosts several small pubs, restaurants, hairdressers, cafes, tanning salons and shops. In the oldest part of The Village there is a re-imagined cobbled street and a large 'olde worlde' style pub, the Montgomerie Arms.

The Village formerly contained a range of unremarkable shops and eateries which served everyday expectations, and were only distinguishable from those in East Kilbride Town Centre on account of their smaller size and quieter setting. In the 1980s-90s several District Council-led drives sought to invest in transforming the area into an essay in civic townscaping, boutique shopping, public art, fine-dining, venue entertainment, and partial street pedestrianisation.

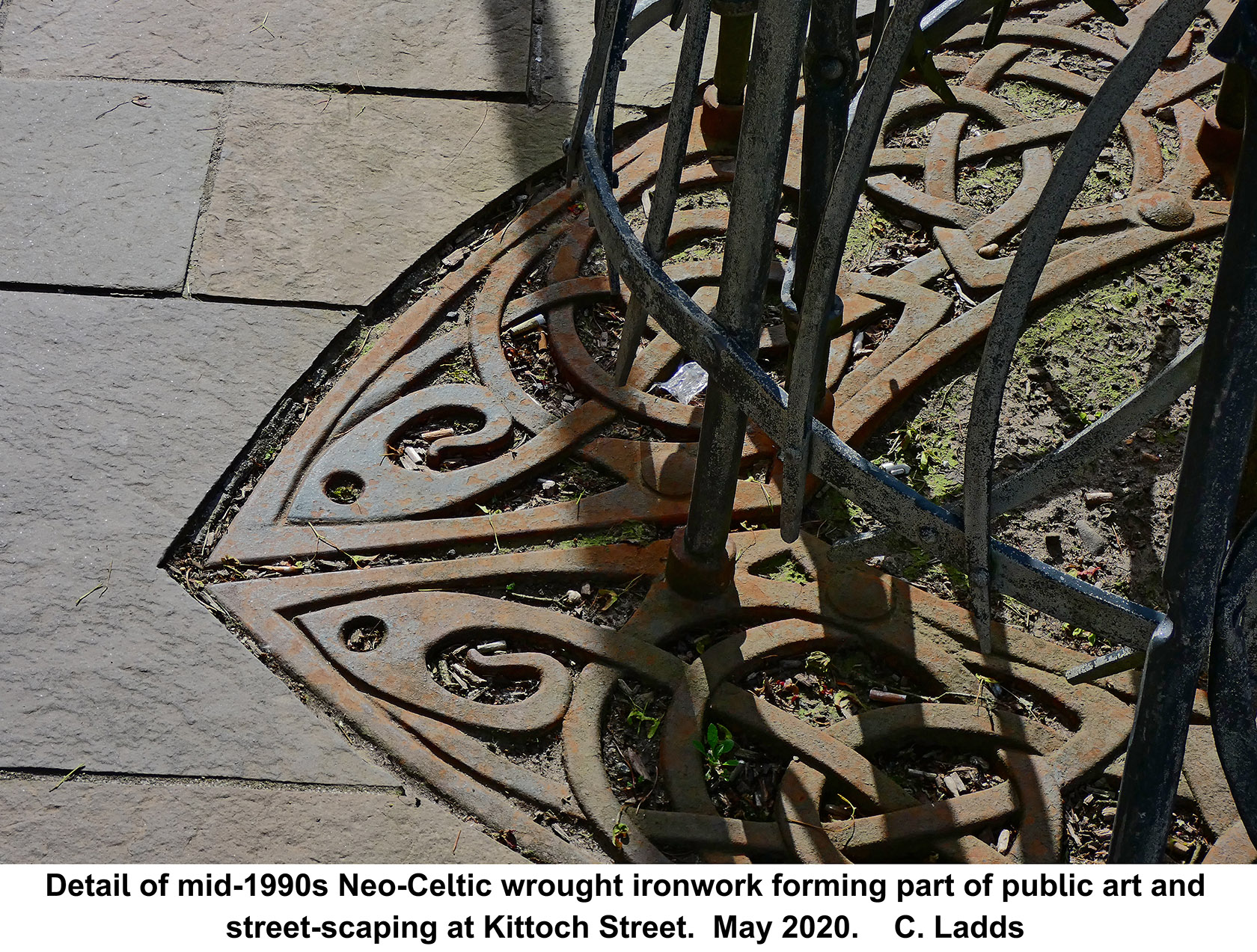
Detail of mid-1990s Neo-Celtic wrought ironwork forming part of public art and street-scaping at Kittoch Street. May 2020. C. Ladds

These related projects were akin to the various outpourings of well-funded civic pride and heritage identity which played out in many Scottish towns and villages in that period, such as in Hamilton, Kilmarnock, Ayr, Glasgow's Merchant City and more. Much of this trend in the West of Scotland was a local and regional response to Glasgow's inner city redevelopment to answer post-industrial decline, as well as the increased regional status brought by Glasgow's cultural-led Regeneration connected to its European City of Culture status in 1990.

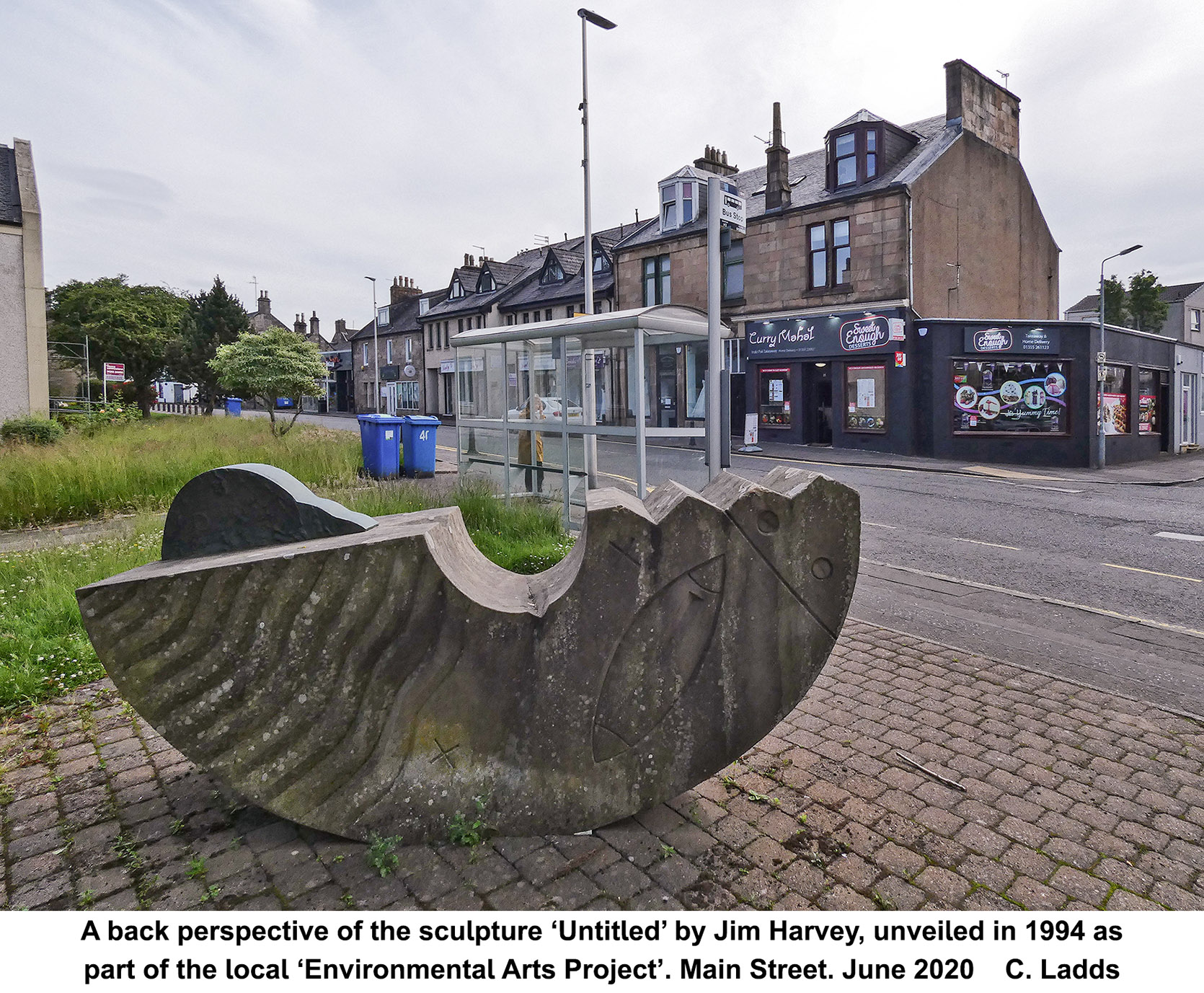
Back perspective of Jim Harvey's sculpture 'Untitled' at Main Street. Unveiled in 1994 for the Environmental Arts Project. C. Ladds, June 2020

This trend was answered more regionally by the fostering of the Clyde Valley and Lanarkshire Tourist Routes and the creation of Strathclyde Park and its loch. The concept was to anchor East Kilbride's cultural offerings in a way that would not be displaced by Glasgow, and to reflect emerging Post-modernist tastes, as well as compliment the larger retail offerings of East Kilbride Town Centre, which reflected a more 1970s-80s paradigm of destination mall-shopping.

These upgrades coincided with the rolling out of Conservation Area status, which alongside since abolished local planning restrictions and by-laws, fostered a carefully regimented ration of liquor and hot food licensing to those of shops; ongoing antisocial behaviour monitoring; signage restrictions; and regular clean-up and maintenance patrols. Funds were also provided to private property owners to refurbish the external appearance of properties to look well kept and in keeping with the traditional village atmosphere.

== Later development ==
The arrival of the railway in the 1860s provided the main impetus of suburban growth because it turned East Kilbride - formerly a rural backwater famed for its sanitation issues - into a viable place for wealthier city merchants and workers to establish homes, whilst maintaining their ability to attend workplaces. It also popularised East Kilbride as a fresh air holiday resort, the prestige of which attracted those looking to establish a holiday home or retirement residence. This led to a flurry of villa-building that picked up in the 1870s and lasted until the 1930s.

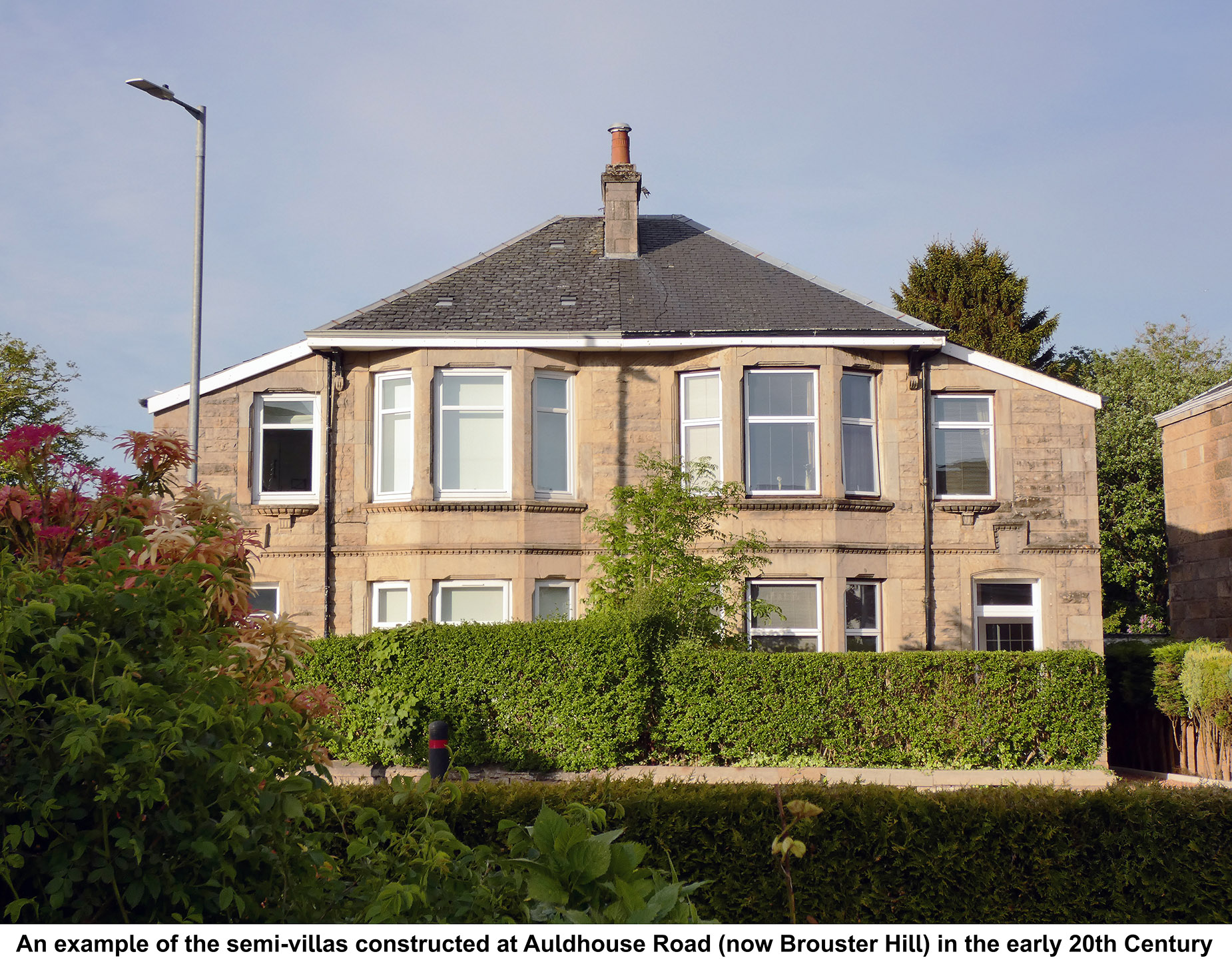
Example of semi-villas at Auldhouse Road (now Brouster Hill) built in the early 1900s. Image: C. Ladds

This mainly affected such areas as Graham Avenue, Glasgow Road (Kirkton Avenue, latterly Old Coach Road), Maxwell Street (now Maxwell Drive), Creighton Grove, Auldhouse Road (now Brouster Hill), and Newlands Road (now Newlands Place). The tail-end of this period saw further villa-building as well as the erection of bungalows at Markethill Road, Auldhouse Road (Brouster Hill) and Stuart Street. Numerous other areas, including those within of the old village, also received additions. Many of these villas were built using stone sourced from great distances using the railway.

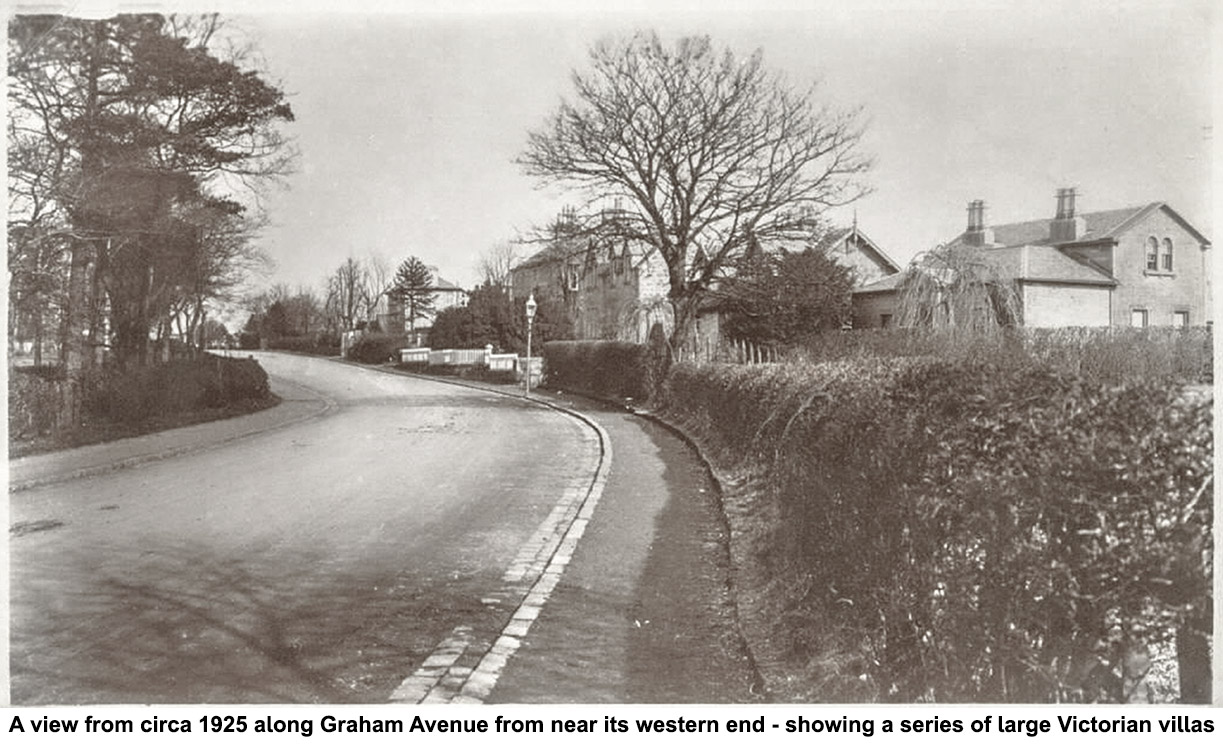
A view along Graham Avenue captured from near its western end. Circa 1925. Showing large Victorian villas. Courtesy of EK&DH Archive

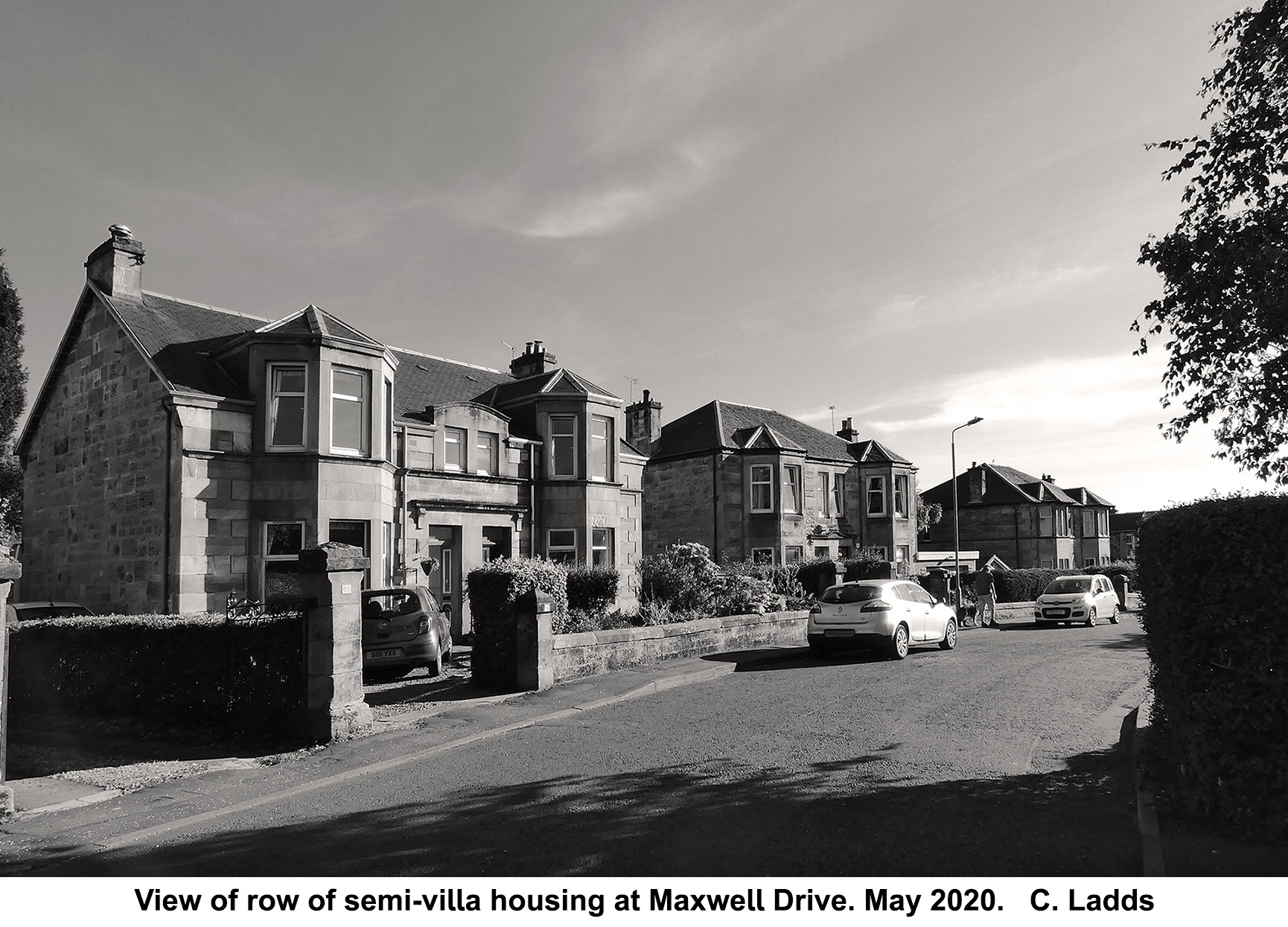
Example of a row of early-20th century semi-villas at Maxwell Street (now Maxwell Drive). May 2020. C. Ladds

This later period of change also saw the rise of County Council housing to aid the housing crisis. These inter-war developments were created in three main phases - those at Kirktonholm Road and adjoining streets, those on the old Glebe Lands that became Murray Place (now West Mains Road) and its adjoining streets, and those at Kirkton Park. These developments mostly took place in the 1920s-30s and were led by the County Council of Lanark.

It was said that these developments lent East Kilbride a grace and dignity it was formerly lacking, and that the area was so sequestered and peaceful that the only thing that could be heard beyond the hiss of gas lamps at night, was the ticking of retirement clocks on mantlepieces.

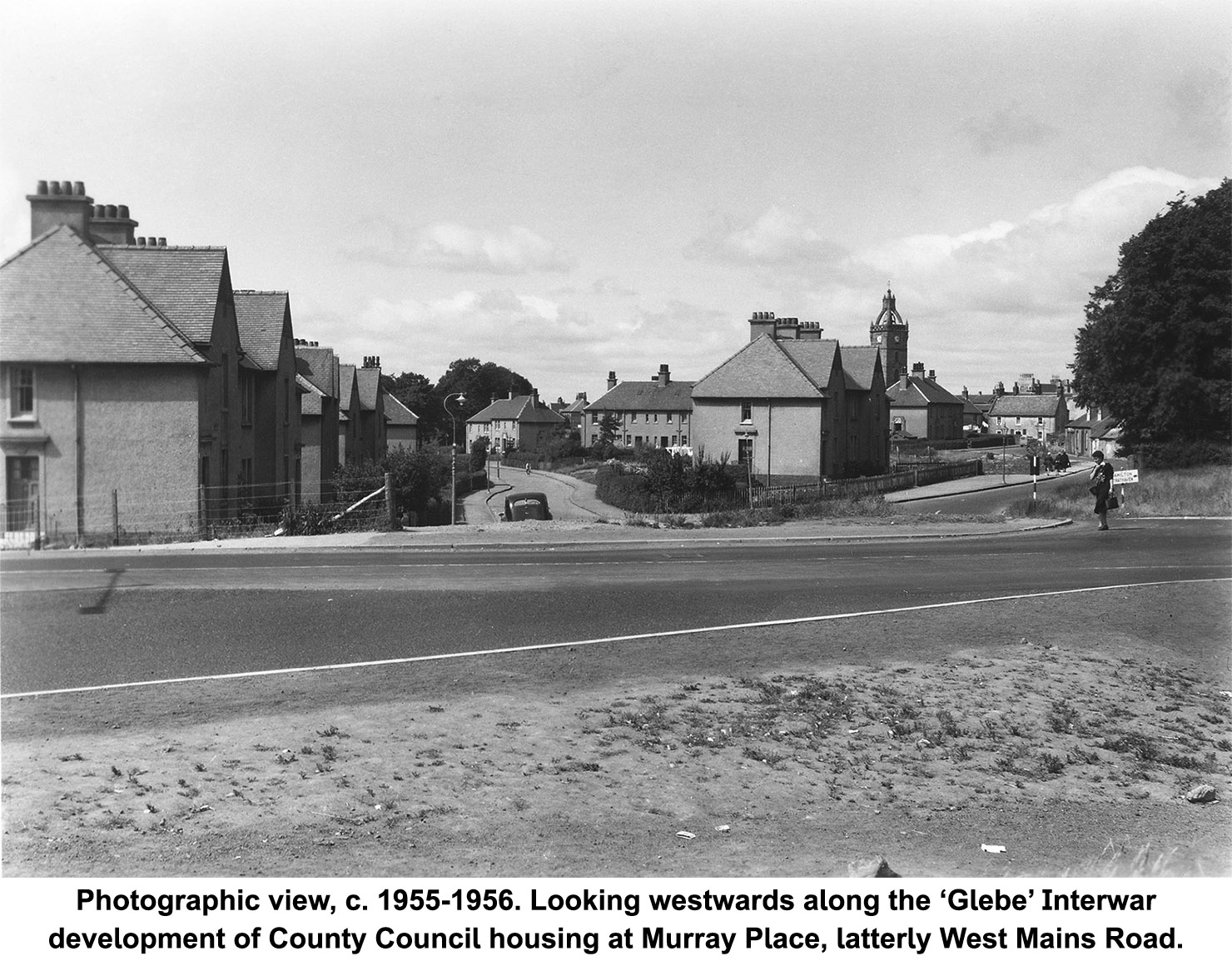
Photographic view from circa 1955-1956. Looking westwards along the 'Glebe' Interwar development of County Council Housing at Murray Place, latterly West Mains Road.

Following the designation of East Kilbride New Town in 1947, the surrounding district was developed in large areas of housing, and this process of urban growth coincided with a period of 'slum clearance' in the village area, to remove poor and substandard buildings whilst preserving the 'best' of the area's vernacular architecture. Large areas were demolished, especially older weaving cottages and Victorian eclectic and tenemental architecture along Main Street, Parkhall Street, Glebe Street, Stuart Street, and Maxwell Road (now Maxwell Drive).

== Modern urban context ==
Nearby and conjoined residential neighbourhoods to The Village are Calderwood, East Mains and West Mains, which partly surround the village and reflect the construction of the new town of East Kilbride, mostly in the 1950s and 1960s. However, these adjoining areas include several scattered buildings which long pre-date the new town, as well as the small weaving village of Maxwellton in Calderwood, dating to the 18th, 19th, and early 20th centuries. To the south of the Village area is the East Kilbride Town Centre precinct, which includes several 'Civic Centre' facilities on its northern side.

The main through roads in the Village area are Stuart Street-Main Street-Old Coach Road, and West Mains Road.

Local shopping additions and expansions of pseudo-neighbourhood shop and facility resources, were provisioned in the 1950s by East Kilbride Development Corporation at Bosfield (Old Coach Road) and Stuart Street, respectively.

== See also ==
- Cumbernauld Village
- Livingston Village
