= Take the Floor (Scottish radio programme) =

Radio programme on BBC Radio Scotland

- Country of origin: United Kingdom
- Home station: BBC Radio Scotland

Take the Floor is the name of a radio programme airing on BBC Radio Scotland. It is the longest-running radio programme in Scotland, dating back to the 1930s when it was called Scottish Dance Music and broadcast by the Scottish Home Service. The programme was given its present name of Take the Floor in 1978 by Chris Worrall, a Music Producer with BBC Radio Scotland (1978-82), who introduced 'live sessions' and 'programme road shows' touring Scotland, together with player interviews, an events diary and reviews of latest record/CD releases. The original programme was presented by David Findlay until his death in 1980 and then by Robbie Shepherd until he stepped down in 2016. In keeping with its predecessor, the current programme also features live sessions from top dance bands, individual musicians and vocalists from across the country. The host of the programme is Gary Innes. The programme typically airs on Saturday evenings and is repeated on Sunday afternoons, however since the beginning of the COVID-19 pandemic and the implementation of lockdown in Scotland in March 2020, replaced its Sunday afternoon repeat with a new live request programme, the first edition of which was broadcast on Sunday 5 April 2020. The Sunday request show subsequently changed its name to "Your Requests with Gary Innes", replacing the previous name, "Take the Floor: Your Requests", first broadcast under this new title on Sunday 22 November 2020. The theme music for the Saturday evening show is the traditional Scottish reel "Kate Dalrymple", and the theme for the Sunday afternoon request show is "Gary Innes Takes the Floor", the second half of which harks back to the theme of the Saturday evening show, written and performed by Fergie MacDonald, from his 50th album "The Ceilidh King: Fergie's 50th Album". "Gary Innes Takes the Floor" was dropped as the theme tune however in the aforementioned rebrand of the request show on 22 November 2020, although it still remains a fan favourite, frequently receiving a number of requests for it to be played.

As of January 2015, BBC Radio Scotland's Take the Floor remains the only Scottish music programme to be broadcast on Scottish radio since its inception in 1978, after the Greatest Hits Radio Scotland network axed their weekly show at the end of December 2014, whilst Scottish music programmes continued to be broadcast on Scottish community radio stations to this day as well.
