= Kate Dalrymple =

Scottish folk song

Katy Dalrymple
Tune for Katy Dalrymple

"Kate Dalrymple" is a traditional Scottish reel. The melody was originally published as "The New Highland Laddie" in 1750. It was recorded by Jimmy Shand in 1955. The Scots song associated with the melody of this name was written by William Watt, East Kilbride. It tells the comic tale of the eponymous muirland spinster who was ugly and unable to find a romantic partner. Coming into an inheritance of fortune, she thereafter found a willing suitor.

It is used by the BBC as the theme music for the BBC Radio Scotland dance music programme Take the Floor.
