= Muirkirk (disambiguation) =

Muirkirk is a village in East Ayrshire, Scotland.

Muirkirk may refer to:

- Muirkirk, Maryland, USA
- Muirkirk railway station, Scotland
- Muirkirk (MARC station), USA
- Muirkirk F.C.

== See also ==
- Muirkirk Enterprise Group
- Muirkirk & North Lowther Uplands Special Protection Area
- Muir (disambiguation)
- Kirk (disambiguation)
