= Dalserf =

Village in South Lanarkshire, Scotland

Coordinates: 55.735°N 3.914°W

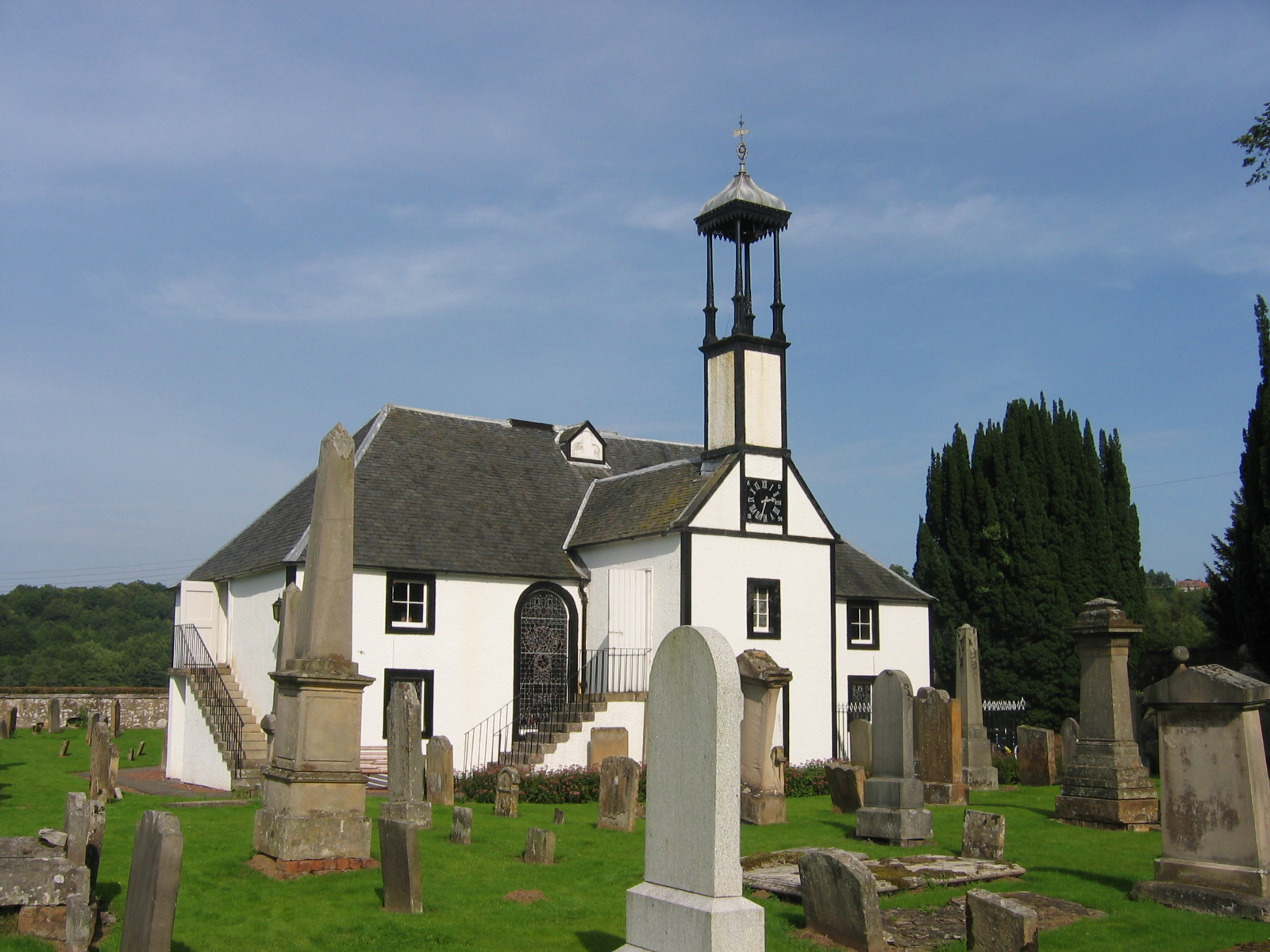
- Dalserf Kirk

- Population: 52 (2001)
- OS grid reference: NS7950
- Civil parish: Dalserf
- Council area: South Lanarkshire
- Lieutenancy area: Lanarkshire
- Country: Scotland
- Sovereign state: United Kingdom
- Post town: LARKHALL
- Postcode district: ML9
- Dialling code: 01698
- Police: Scotland
- Fire: Scottish
- Ambulance: Scottish
- UK Parliament: Lanark and Hamilton East
- Scottish Parliament: Hamilton, Larkhall and Stonehouse

Dalserf is a small village of only a few streets in South Lanarkshire, Scotland. It lies on the River Clyde, 2 miles (3 km) east of Larkhall and 7 miles (11 km) south east of Hamilton.

Dalserf is also a traditional civil parish. It includes Ashgill, Larkhall, Netherburn, Rosebank and Shawsburn. The parish has a population of 17,985 (mostly from Larkhall's near 15,500 population).

The name of the village comes from the Gaelic dail, meaning "field", and Serf, the name of a 6th-century saint who dwelt here. Of old, it was also known as Machan or Machanshire, from the Gaelic Maghan meaning "small plain".

The village kirk, built in 1655, is dedicated to Saint Serf, and may be built on the site of an early church founded by him. The church dates from The Killing Time, when the rebel Covenanters were persecuted for their faith, and was a centre of Covenanter activity. John M'Millan, the controversial preacher and first post-Revolution minister of the United Societies, is buried in the kirkyard. The kirk is Category A listed.

A ferry once operated across the Clyde at Dalserf, although this has long since been superseded by the nearby Garrion Bridge. Dalserf railway station once served the village.

== See also ==
- Listed buildings in Dalserf
