= Auchenheath railway station =

Railway station in South Lanarkshire, Scotland

Coordinates: 55.67153°N 3.90027°W

Auchenheath
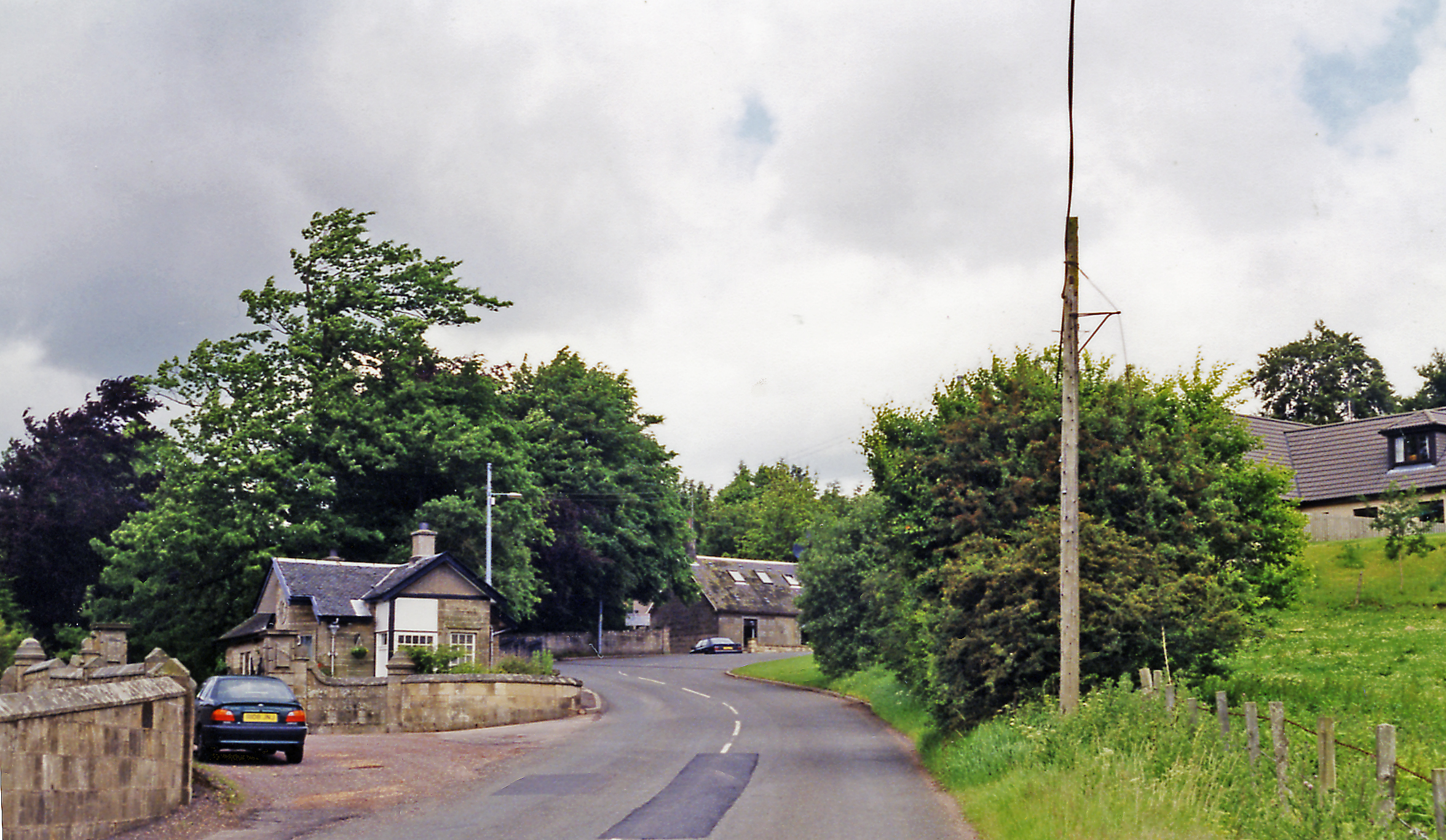
- The station location (1998)

General information
- Location: Auchenheath, South Lanarkshire; Scotland
- Platforms: 1

Other information
- Status: Disused

History
- Original company: Lesmahagow Railway
- Pre-grouping: Caledonian Railway
- Post-grouping: London Midland and Scottish Railway

Key dates
- 1 December 1866: Station opens
- January 1941: Station closes
- May 1945: Station reopens
- 1 October 1951: Station closes
Location

Auchenheath railway station was just outside Auchenheath, a hamlet in the county of South Lanarkshire, Scotland. It was served by local trains on the Coalburn Branch south of Glasgow.

The nearest railway station to Auchenheath is now Lanark.

== History ==
Opened by the Lesmahagow Railway, then joining the Caledonian Railway it became part of the London Midland and Scottish Railway during the Grouping of 1923. Passing on to the Scottish Region of British Railways during the nationalisation of 1948. It was then closed by the British Railways.

== The site today ==
The station house still exists and there are remains of the platforms at the northern end.

Preceding station	Historical railways	Following station
Brocketsbrae	Caledonian Railway; Coalburn Branch	Tillietudlem
