= Larkhall East railway station =

Disused railway station in Larkhall, South Lanarkshire

Larkhall East

General information
- Location: Larkhall, Lanarkshire; Scotland
- Coordinates: 55.74556°N 3.96641°W
- Grid reference: NS767523
- Platforms: 2

Other information
- Status: Disused

History
- Original company: Caledonian Railway
- Pre-grouping: Caledonian Railway
- Post-grouping: London, Midland and Scottish Railway; British Railways (Scottish Region)

Key dates
- 1 December 1866: Opened as Larkhall
- 1 June 1905: Name changed to Larkhall East
- January 1941: Closed
- July 1945: Reopened
- 10 September 1951: Closed
Location

Larkhall East railway station served the town of Larkhall, in the historical county of Lanarkshire, Scotland, from 1866 to 1951 on the Lesmahagow Railway.

== History ==
The station was opened on 1 December 1866 by the Caledonian Railway. On the northbound line was the station building with a waiting room on the southbound line, to the east of the platforms was the goods yard and at the east end of the station was the signal box. 'East' was added to the stations name on 1 June 1905 when Larkhall Central opened. The signal box closed in 1940 when the line was singled. It was known as Larkhall East Halt in the 1941 edition of the handbook of stations. The station closed in January 1941 but reopened in July 1945, before closing permanently on 10 September 1951, although it was still used in July 1960 by the Orange Order for their annual walks to commemorate the Battle of Boyne.

Preceding station	Disused railways	Following station
Ferniegair; Line partially open; station open	Caledonian Railway; Lesmahagow Railway	Dalserf; Line and station closed
