= Coalburn Branch =

Scottish railway line from 1856 to 1968

Overview
- Locale: Scotland
- Dates of operation: 1 December 1856–1968

The Coalburn Branch was a branch line constructed by the Caledonian Railway from Lesmahagow railway station to Bankend railway station. It was the main branch of the Lesmahagow Railway.

== History ==
=== Coalburn Branch (1856-1968) ===
- 1 December 1866, Motherwell, Ferniegair (Chatelherault), Larkhall (Larkhall East), Ayr Road (Dalserf), Stonehouse, Cots Castle, Bents (Netherburn), Blackwood, Auchenheath and Brocketsbrae railway stations open.
- 1 May 1868, Bents is renamed to Netherburn.
- 1 June 1869, Brocketsbrae is renamed to Lesmahagow.
- 1 October 1876, Tillietudlem opens.
- 2 October 1876, Ferniegair and Motherwell are re-located.
- 1 November 1891, Coalburn opens.
- January 1893, Alton Heights opens.
- 1 July 1903, Ayr Road is renamed to Dalserf.
- 1 June 1905, Lesmahagow is renamed Brocketsbrae.
- 1 July 1905, Stonehouse, Cots Castle and Blackwood closes; Stonehouse opens.
- 1 June 1906, Larkhall is renamed to Larkhall East.
- 1 January 1917, Ferniegair and Motherwell closes.
- 1926, Alton Heights closes.
- July 1926, Bankend closes.
- January 1941, Larkhall East, Dalserf, Netherburn, Tillietudlem, Auchenheath and Brocketsbrae close.
- May 1945, Dalserf, Netherburn, Tillietudlem, Auchenheath and Brocketsbrae re-open.
- July 1945, Larkhall East re-opens.
- 10 September 1951, Larkhall East closes.
- 1 October 1951, Dalserf, Netherburn, Tillietudlem, Auchenheath and Brocketsbrae closes.
- 4 October 1965, Auchlochan, Coalburn and Stonehouse close.

=== Present day ===
- 1974, British Rail build a new Motherwell railway station.
- 15 May 1989, Airbles railway station opens.
- December 2005, Chatelherault railway station reopens.

== Gallery ==
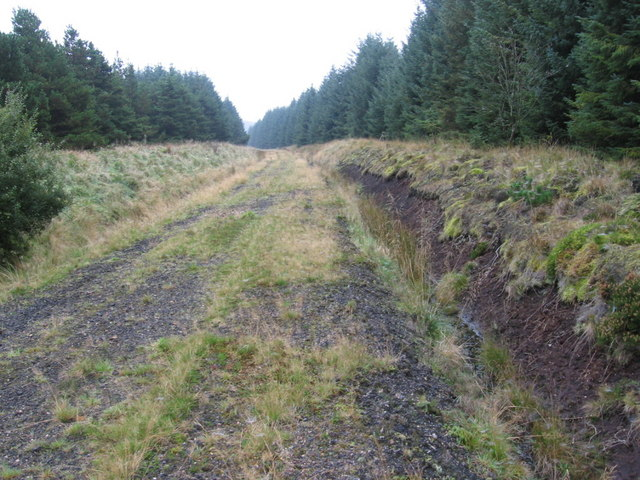
Tracks of old railway, Coalburn

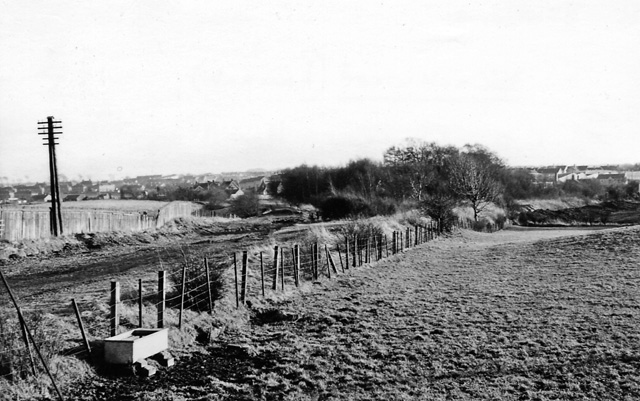
Site of Blackwood railway station

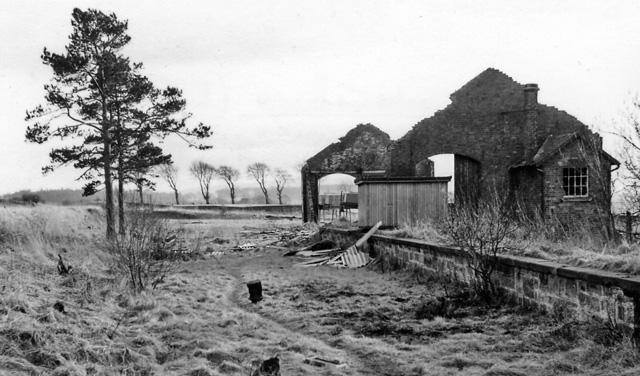
Site of Brocketsbrae railway station

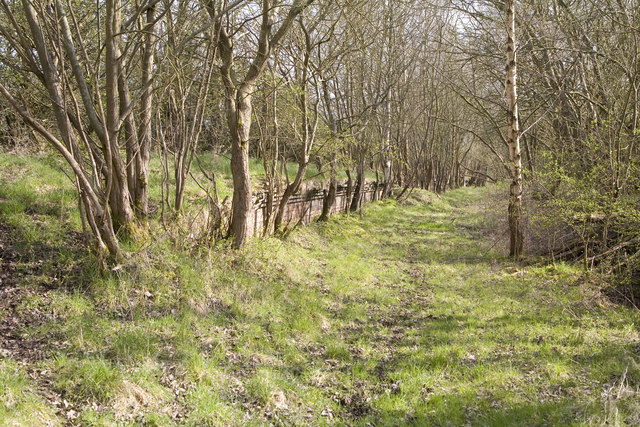
Remains of Tillietudlem railway station

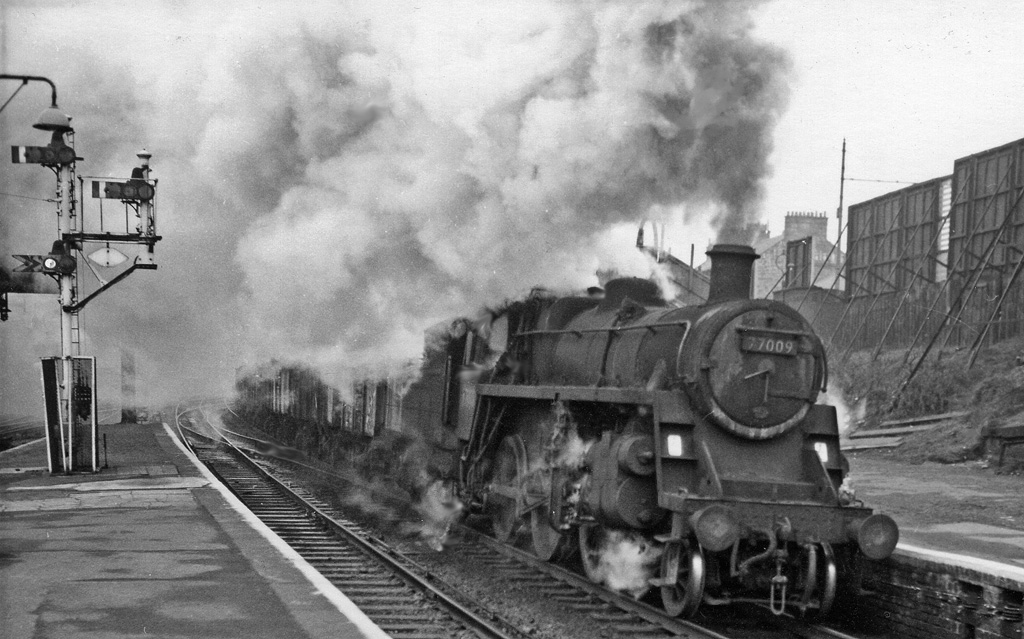
Motherwell railway station

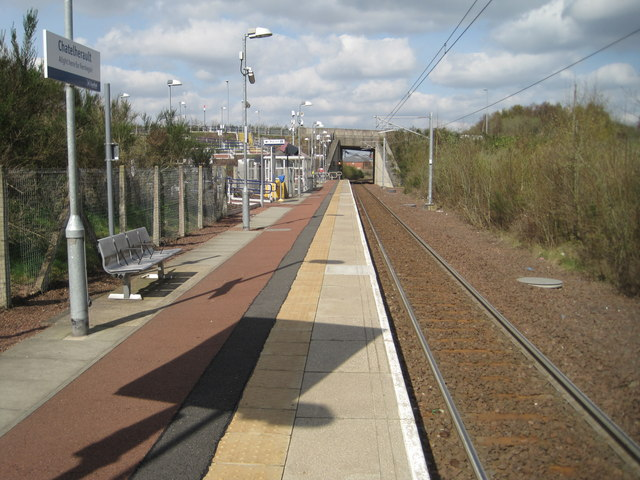
Chatelherault railway station

== See also ==
- Lesmahagow Railway
- Caledonian Railway branches in South Lanarkshire § Topography
- Hamilton Branch (railway)
