= Stonehouse railway station (Lanarkshire) =

Disused railway station in Stonehouse, South Lanarkshire

Stonehouse

General information
- Location: Stonehouse, Lanarkshire; Scotland
- Coordinates: 55.6999°N 3.9871°W
- Grid reference: NS752469
- Platforms: 1 (initially); 4 (later added)

Other information
- Status: Disused

History
- Original company: Caledonian Railway
- Pre-grouping: Caledonian Railway
- Post-grouping: London, Midland and Scottish Railway; British Rail (Scottish Region)

Key dates
- 1 December 1866: Opened
- 1 July 1905: Resited
- 4 October 1965: Closed
Location

Stonehouse railway station served the village of Stonehouse, in the historical county of Lanarkshire, Scotland, from 1866 to 1965 on the Lesmahagow Railway.

== History ==
The station was opened on 1 December 1866 by the Caledonian Railway. It initially only had one platform. The goods yard was to the south. It had a signal box, which opened in 1893, closed in 1905 when the station was resited. The resited station had 4 platforms, new station buildings and a stone-built goods shed. The goods yard closed in 1964. The station closed on 4 October 1965.

Preceding station	Disused railways	Following station
Dalserf; Line and station closed	Caledonian Railway; Lesmahagow Railway	Netherburn; Line and station closed
