= Douglas West railway station =

Former railway station in Scotland

Douglas West
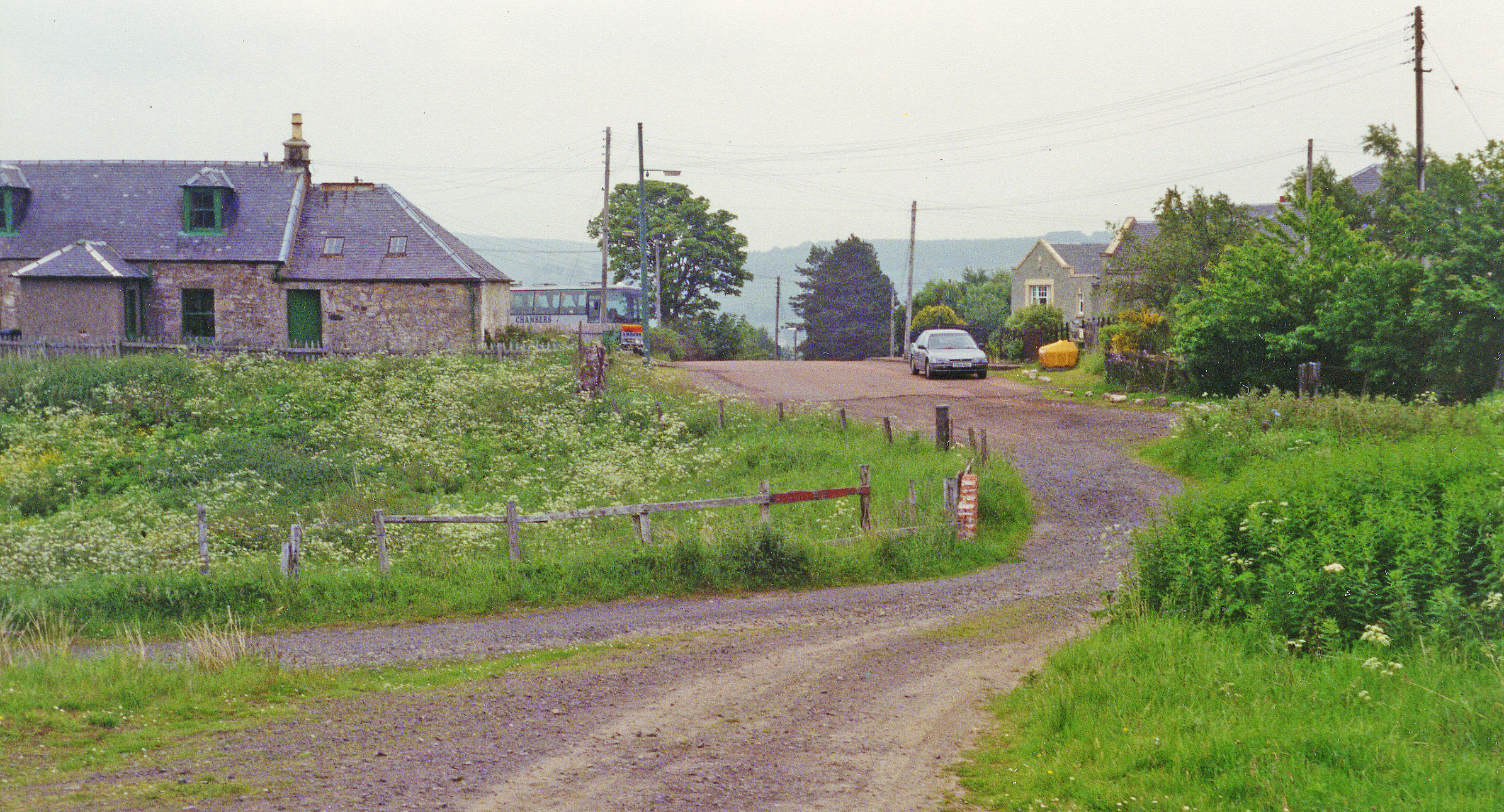
- Site of the station in 1994

General information
- Location: Douglas, South Lanarkshire; Scotland
- Coordinates: 55.5579°N 3.8715°W
- Grid reference: NS820309
- Platforms: 2

Other information
- Status: Disused

History
- Original company: Caledonian Railway
- Pre-grouping: Caledonian Railway
- Post-grouping: London, Midland and Scottish Railway

Key dates
- 1 October 1896: Station opened
- 5 October 1964: Station closed
Location

Douglas West railway station served the village of Douglas West, South Lanarkshire in Scotland between 1896 and 1964.

== History ==
The railway line between Happendon (then called Douglas) and Muirkirk was built by the Lanark Railway, and it opened for goods on 1 January 1873; passenger services were introduced on 1 June 1874. The Muirkirk and Lesmahagow Junction Railway (M&LJR), which was a line 2 1/4 miles (3.6 km) long connecting the Lanark Railway at Poneil Junction with the Lesmahagow Railway at Alton Heights Junction, opened for goods on 2 April 1883; passenger services being introduced in 1894.

The station at Douglas West was opened on 1 October 1896 by the Caledonian Railway, which had absorbed the Lanark Railway, the Lesmahagow Railway and the M&LJR. It was situated to the south-west of Poneil Junction, where the former Lanark Railway line was met by the former M&LJR line. There were two platforms connected by a footbridge; close to the southbound platform was a signal box and behind that a goods shed.

Passenger services over the former M&LJR line were withdrawn on 11 September 1939.

The station was closed by British Railways on 5 October 1964.

Preceding station	Disused railways	Following station
Alton Heights Junction; Line and station closed	Caledonian Railway; Muirkirk and Lesmahagow Junction Railway	Inches; Line and station closed
Happendon; Line and station closed	Caledonian Railway; Lanark Railway	Inches; Line and station closed
