= Larkhall Academy =

Location
- Broomhill Road; Larkhall, ML9 1QN; Scotland
- Coordinates: 55.734188°N 3.974563°W

Information
- Motto: Ad Altiora
- Established: 1868
- Authority: South Lanarkshire
- Head teacher: Andy Smith
- Scottish Highers: 1st Years – 6th Years
- Gender: Mixed
- Enrollment: 1200
- Website: www.larkhall.s-lanark.sch.uk

Larkhall Academy is a non-denominational coeducational secondary school in Larkhall, South Lanarkshire, Scotland. The current head teacher is Andy Smith. The school has an additional support needs department. The school's catchment area includes the town of Larkhall as well as the villages of Stonehouse, Ashgill and Netherburn.

== History ==
Larkhall Academy Subscription School was founded in Union Street in 1868. In 1972, the school premises were moved to Cherryhill. The new school building opened in 2009 and headteacher Tom Dingwall retired shortly after.

In 2018, former head teacher Bryan Kee resigned. On 14 June 2018 the school was awarded Digital Schools status for promoting digital skills in their classrooms. The S4 and S6 pupils recorded the best SQA exam results since the introduction of the new qualifications in 2014.

=== Gallery ===
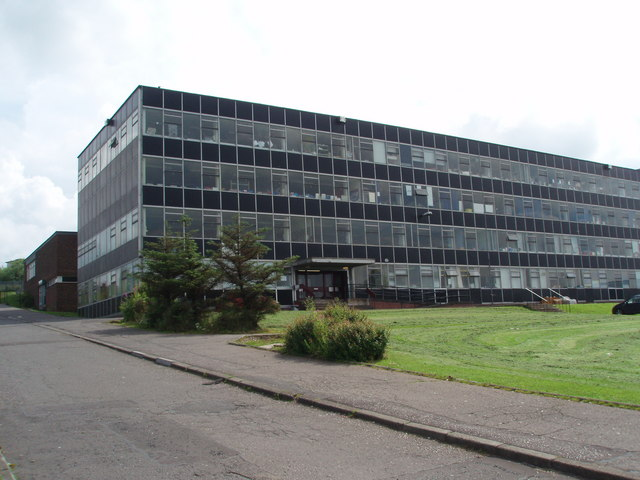
Old building, 2007

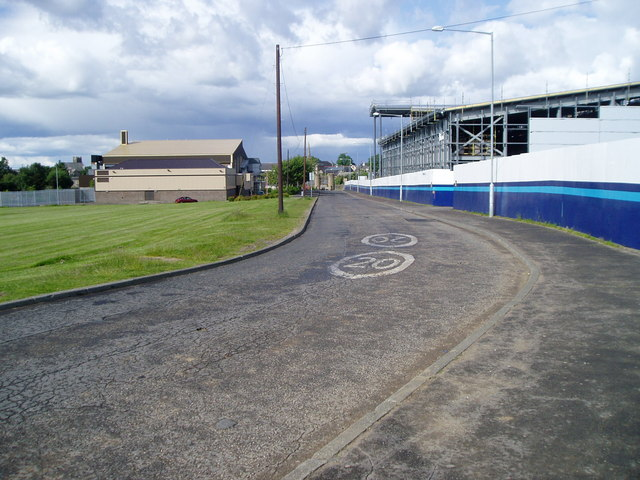
New building during construction, 2008

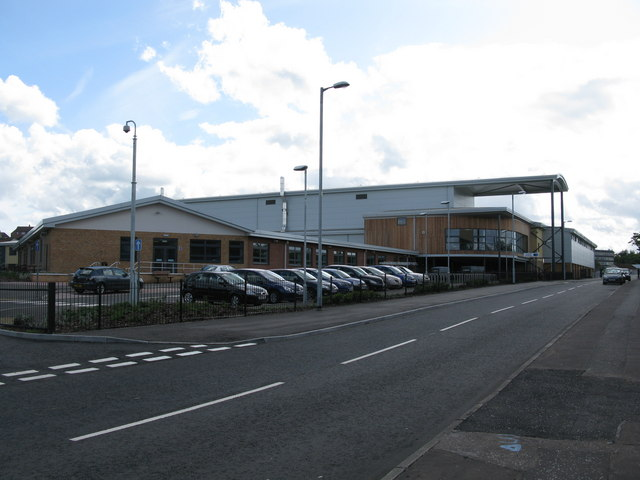
New building, 2009
