= Inches railway station =

Disused railway station in South Lanarkshire, Scotland

Inches

General information
- Location: Glespin, South Lanarkshire; Scotland
- Coordinates: 55.5341°N 3.9228°W
- Grid reference: NZ787283
- Platforms: 2

Other information
- Status: Disused

History
- Original company: Caledonian Railway
- Pre-grouping: Caledonian Railway
- Post-grouping: London, Midland and Scottish Railway; British Railways (Scottish Region)

Key dates
- 1 June 1874: Opened
- 5 October 1964: Closed
Location

Inches railway station co-served the hamlet of Glespin, South Lanarkshire, Scotland, from 1874 to 1964 on the Muirkirk Branch.

== History ==
The station was opened on 1 June 1874 by the Caledonian Railway. It was situated on the site of Inches farm, near Monksfoot Bridge. It served a remote area. The hamlet of Glespin was still developing when this station opened. At the east end of the eastbound platform was the signal box and on the north side was the goods yard. In 1903 a branch opened on the west side which served Carmacoup Colliery. The station closed on 5 October 1964.

Preceding station	Disused railways	Following station
Douglas West; Line and station closed	Caledonian Railway; Muirkirk Branch	Glenbuck; Line and station closed
