= Raploch Park =

Venue in South Lanarkshire, Scotland

- Location within South Lanarkshire
- Location: Larkhall, Scotland
- Coordinates: 55.7396°N 3.9798°W
- Surface: Grass
- Record attendance: 5,000

Construction
- Opened: 1878
- Demolished: 1960s

Tenant
- Royal Albert

Raploch Park, also known as the Larkhall Greyhound Stadium, was a football ground and greyhound racing stadium in Larkhall, Scotland. It was the home ground of Royal Albert.

== History ==
Royal Albert played at Raploch Park from their foundation in 1878. The ground was on the north-western side of Raploch Street, opposite Gasworks Park, the home ground of Larkhall Thistle. The ground had a running track around the outside of the pitch, and a pavilion and covered stand were erected on the north-western side of the pitch. The track was later elongated to allow greyhound racing, with kennels built in the northern corner of the site. The ground's probable record attendance of 5,000 was set on 6 December 1890 for a Scottish Cup fifth round replay match against Celtic, with the visitors winning 4–0. This was equalled for a Scottish Cup second round match against Dundee on 11 February 1922, which Royal Albert lost 1–0, and again for a Scottish Cup first round replay against Clydebank on 17 January 1923, which ended in a 0–0 draw.

Royal Albert were elected into the new Third Division of the Scottish Football League in the same year, and the first SFL match at Raploch Park was played on 18 August 1923, a 3–0 win over Dumbarton Harp. However, the Third Division was disbanded at the end of the 1925–26 season, with the final SFL match played at the ground on 16 April 1926, a 3–0 win over Montrose.

Although Royal Albert folded, they were reformed as a Junior club, which continued to use the ground until the 1960s, when it was demolished and the site used for housing. The club moved to Robert Smillie Memorial Park.

== Greyhound racing ==
Sam Park and George Reid introduced greyhound racing to the sports stadium in 1938. The venue would be known as the Larkhall Greyhound Stadium from 1938 and the first meeting took place on 21 December 1938. The racing was independent (unlicensed) for 26 years until the track closed in 1964. Robert Hamilton remained as the Racing Manager throughout the entire 26 years.
