= John Clelland =

Scottish footballer (1863 – 1944)

Personal information
- Full name: John White Clelland
- Date of birth: 6 January 1863
- Place of birth: Hamilton, Scotland
- Date of death: 7 September 1944 (aged 81)
- Place of death: Larkhall, Scotland
- Positions: Centre-half; half-back

Senior career*
Years	Team	Apps	(Gls)
- Royal Albert

International career
1891	Scotland	1	(0)
- * Club domestic league appearances and goals

John White Clelland (6 January 1863 – 7 September 1944) was a Scottish footballer who played as a centre-half or half-back and made one appearance for the Scotland national team.

== Career ==
Clelland played club football mainly for Royal Albert during his career, winning the Lanarkshire Cup four times; his brothers also played for the club. He also played for Cowlairs, and while there was selected for the Glasgow FA team (he also played for Lanarkshire).

He earned his first and only cap for Scotland on 28 March 1891 in the 1890–91 British Home Championship against Ireland. The home match, which was played at Celtic Park in Glasgow, finished as a 2–1 win for Scotland; he remains the only serving Royal Albert player to have been selected for international duty.

He also played lawn bowls to a high standard, and was a distance runner with Clydesdale Harriers.

== Personal life ==
Clelland was born on 6 January 1863 in Hamilton to John Clelland, a coal miner, and Margaret Clelland (née White). Clelland was married to Elizabeth Ann Dodds, and worked as a publican. He died of cancer on 7 September 1944 in Larkhall at the age of 81.

== Career statistics ==
=== International ===
Scotland
Year	Apps	Goals
1891	1	0
Total	1	0
