= Auchenheath =

Coordinates: 55.671654°N 3.894081°W

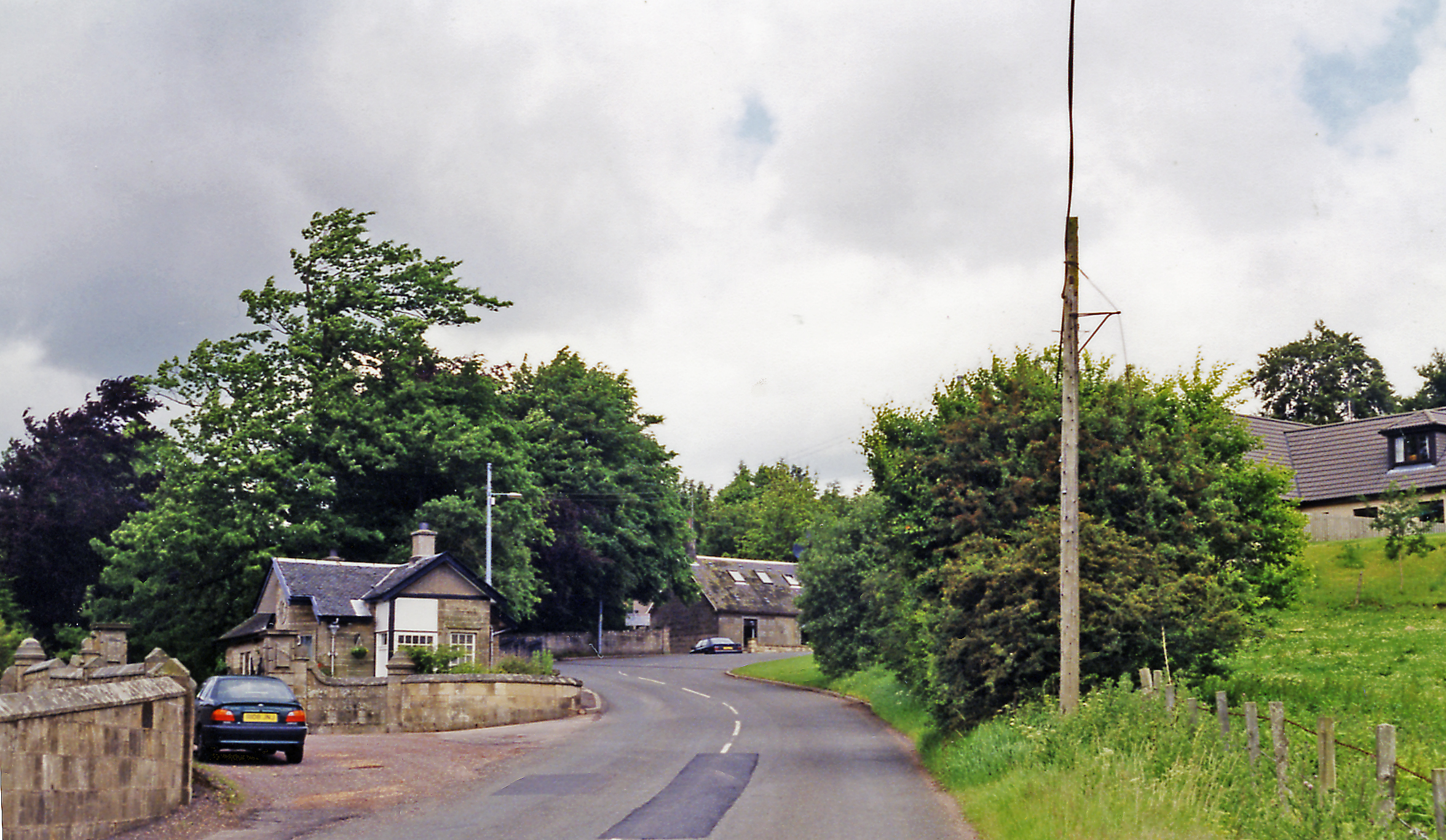
- Auchenheath

- Location within South Lanarkshire
- Council area: South Lanarkshire
- Lieutenancy area: Lanarkshire
- Country: Scotland
- Sovereign state: United Kingdom
- Post town: LANARK
- Postcode district: ML11
- Dialling code: 01555
- Police: Scotland
- Fire: Scottish
- Ambulance: Scottish
- UK Parliament: Lanark and Hamilton East
- Scottish Parliament: Clydesdale

Auchenheath is a small village in South Lanarkshire, Scotland. It is on the River Nethan and is located near Blackwood, Kirkmuirhill, and Lanark.

Auchenheath House is a category B listed Italianate house. Originally built around 1842, it was extended and a chapel added later in the 19th century.

== See also ==
- List of places in South Lanarkshire
