= James Gray (footballer, born 1878) =

English footballer

Personal information
- Full name: James Archibald Gray
- Date of birth: 1878
- Place of birth: Keynsham, Bristol, England
- Date of death: 1937 (aged 61–62)
- Position: Wing half

Senior career*
Years	Team	Apps	(Gls)
1895–1896	Cadzow Oak		
1896–1899	Abercorn		
1899–1900	Clyde		
1900–1901	RoyalAlbert		
1901–1902	Clyde		
1903–1904	Bristol Rovers		
1904–1905	Aston Villa	7	(0)
1905–1907	Rangers		
1907–1908	Tottenham Hotspur	15	(0)
1908–1911	Leyton		
1911	Bristol Rovers		
Total		22+	(0)
- * Club domestic league appearances and goals

James Gray (1878–1937) was an English footballer who played in the Football League for Aston Villa.

== Career ==
Released by Rangers in April 1907 Gray moved down to London and signed for Tottenham in May 1907. His debut occurred on 18 September 1907 which was a Western League game away to Bristol Rovers which Spurs lost 2–1.

== Works cited ==
- Soar, Phil (1995). Tottenham Hotspur The Official Illustrated History 1882–1995. Hamlyn. ISBN 0-600-58706-1.
- Goodwin, Bob (1992). The Spurs Alphabet. ACL & Polar Publishing (UK) Ltd. ISBN 0-9514862-8-4.
