= Merryton railway station =

Railway station in South Lanarkshire, Scotland

Merryton
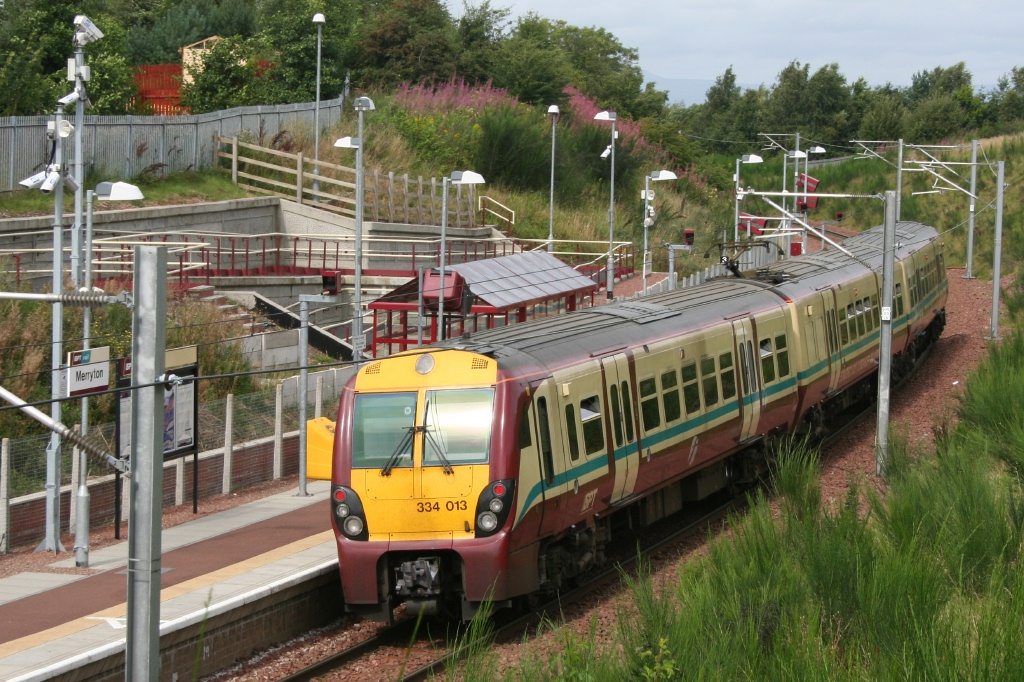

General information
- Location: Larkhall, South Lanarkshire; Scotland
- Coordinates: 55.7489°N 3.9775°W
- Grid reference: NS759523
- Manager: ScotRail
- Transit authority: SPT
- Platforms: 1

Other information
- Station code: MEY

Key dates
- 12 December 2005: Opened

Passengers
- 2021/22: ▲39,622
- 2022/23: ▲56,250
- 2023/24: ▲67,814
- 2024/25: ▲74,472
- 2025/26: ▲75,986
Location
Notes
- Passenger statistics from the Office of Rail and Road

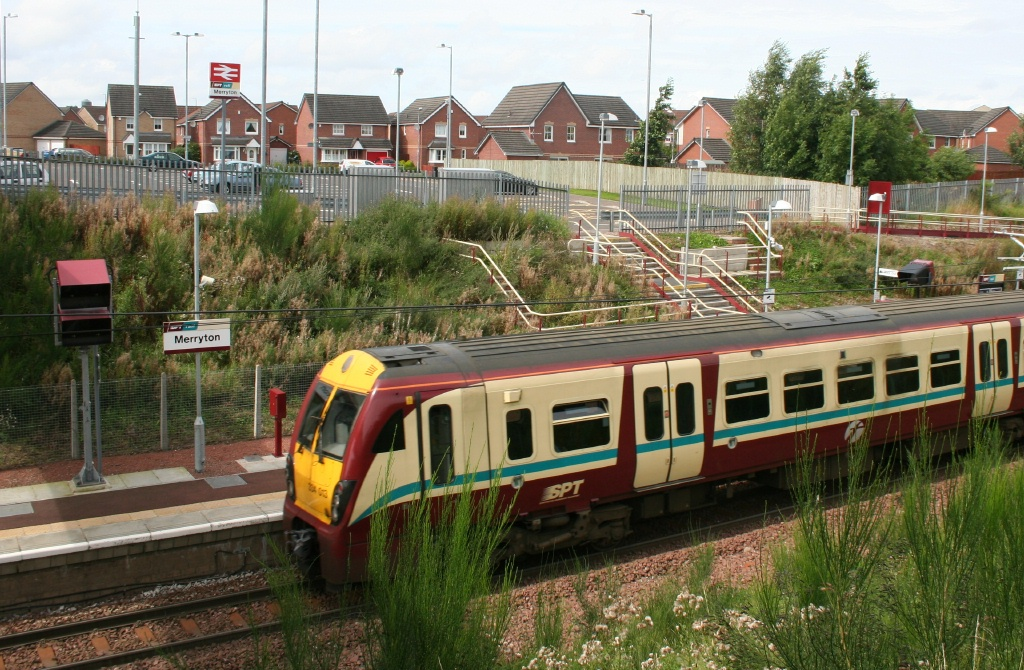
Partick bound train entering station with car park behind

Merryton railway station is a railway station in Larkhall, Scotland. The station is managed by ScotRail and lies on the Argyle Line.

The station was officially opened on 9 December 2005, as part of the Larkhall branch re-opened at the same time.

The station is located on the CR Mid Lanark Lines just south of the site of the previous Merryton Junction where the Caledonian Railway Coalburn Branch diverged from the CR Mid Lanark Lines.

== Facilities ==
The station has a car park but is not permanently staffed.

== Services ==
From the opening of the Larkhall Branch in December 2005, a service has operated on Monday to Saturdays to Dalmuir via Glasgow Central northbound and to Larkhall southbound every 30 minutes. In the May 2016 timetable, this now runs to Milngavie in the northbound direction but still originates from Dalmuir going south.

In December 2007 an hourly service (in each direction) commenced on Sundays. This runs to Larkhall and to Balloch via Clydebank.

Preceding station	National Rail	Following station
Larkhall	ScotRail; Argyle Line	Chatelherault

== Sources ==
- Jowett, Alan (March 1989). Jowett's Railway Atlas of Great Britain and Ireland: From Pre-Grouping to the Present Day (1st ed.). Sparkford: Patrick Stephens Ltd. ISBN 978-1-85260-086-0. OCLC 22311137.
- RAILSCOT on Coalburn Branch
- RAILSCOT on Merryton Junction
- New Link for Larkhall opens - BBC News Scotland website
