= Dalserf railway station =

Former railway station in Scotland

Coordinates: 55.7362°N 3.9426°W

Dalserf railway station Ayr Road

General information
- Location: Dalserf, South Lanarkshire; Scotland
- Platforms: 2

Other information
- Status: Disused

History
- Original company: Lesmahagow Railway
- Pre-grouping: Caledonian Railway
- Post-grouping: London, Midland and Scottish Railway

Key dates
- 1 December 1866: Opened as Ayr Road
- 1 July 1903: Renamed as Dalserf
- 1 October 1951: Closed
Location

Dalserf railway station served the village of Dalserf in South Lanarkshire, Scotland, on the Coalburn branch of the Caledonian Railway line.

== History ==
=== Overview ===
Passing under the line immediately to the northwest, a curved deviation in the road replaced the previous level crossing for the goods line at this location. Opened as Ayr Road in 1866, the station was renamed Dalserf in 1903. Being an exhausting 1.6-mile (2.6 km) walk along the road from the village, many locals considered the new name a joke. Progressively doubled, the main line to Coalburn via Tillietudlem was again singled in 1940. Temporarily closed from January 1941 to May 1945, the station closed permanently in 1951. The line closed to freight southwards in 1960, and northwards in 1964.

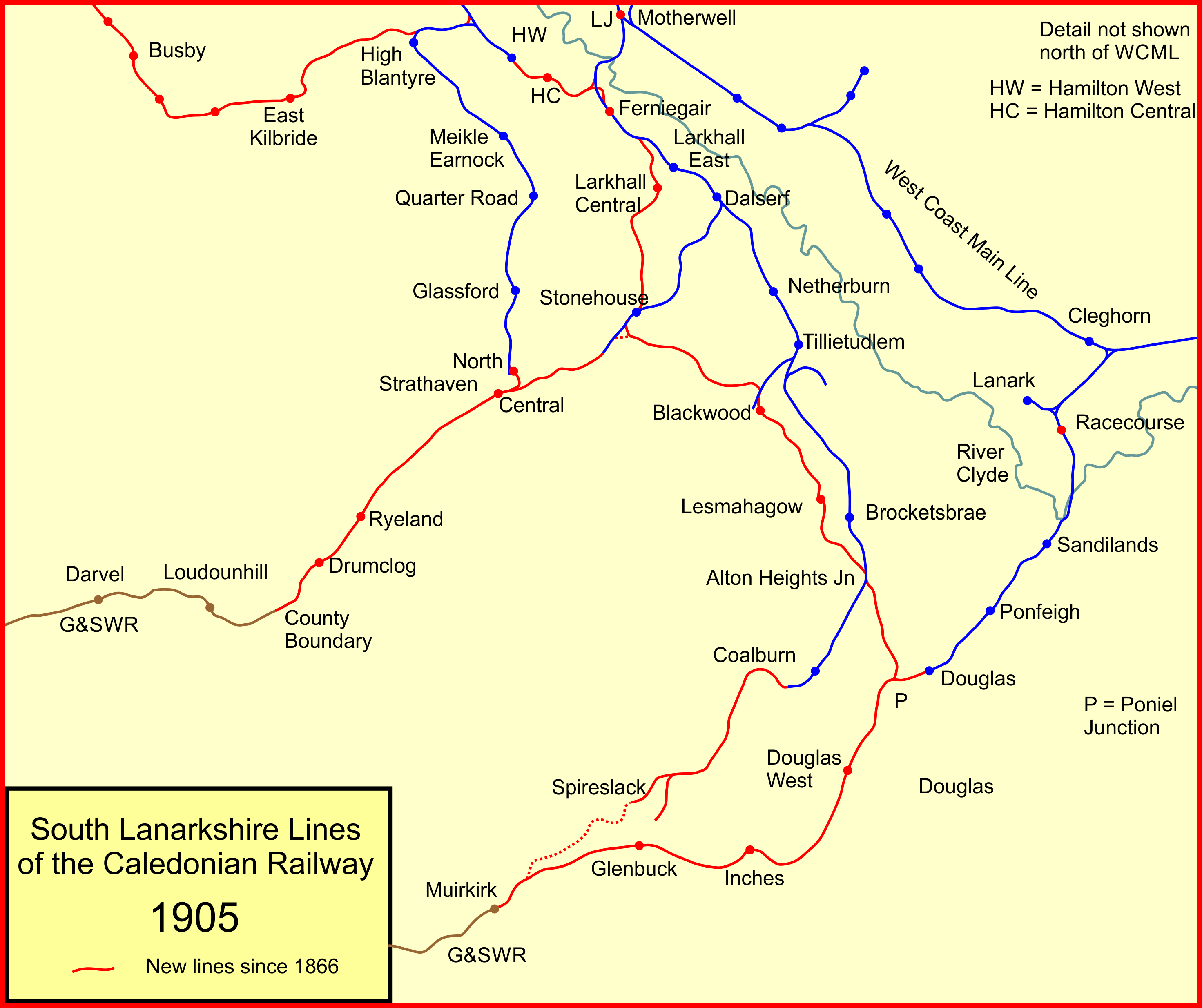
The railways of South Lanarkshire in 1905

=== Infrastructure ===
The station comprised side platforms linked by a footbridge. The main building and goods yard were on the southwest side. On the northeast side was a platform shelter and the Cornsilloch Colliery siding.

The signal box was immediately southeast beside Stonehouse Junction (renamed Dalserf Junction). Farther southeast were sidings at one-half mile (0.8 km) for Ashgillhead Colliery, and at three-quarters mile (1.2 km) for Auldton Colliery. Immediately northwest was Milburn Chemical Works/Colliery (formerly Skellyton).

Only the station house remains, now a private dwelling. A stone abutment from the railway bridge, 300 yards (270 m) southeast from the station, still stands.

=== Services ===
Preceding station	Historical railways	Following station
Larkhall East; Line and station closed	Caledonian Railway; Lesmahagow Branch	Netherburn; Line and station closed
Larkhall East; Line and station closed	Caledonian Railway; Stonehouse Branch	Stonehouse; Line and station closed

Passenger trains proceeded as far north as Ferniegair from December 1866, and via Motherwell to Glasgow Buchanan Street from April 1868. Horse-drawn buses connected Ferniegair to Hamilton West prior to the October 1876 opening to passenger traffic of the new rail link offering onward travel to Glasgow Southside.

In 1887, weekday trains were: 6 via Netherburn to Brocketsbrae (called Lesmahagow at the time), and 5 via Stonehouse to Blackwood. Each southeast-bound train to Ayr Road, comprising up to 8 carriages, was then split for the separate routes.
In 1905, when Larkhall Central opened, Larkhall became Larkhall East, and Stonehouse trains no longer travelled via Dalserf.
In 1910, weekday trains were 4, terminating at either Netherburn, Brocketsbrae, or Coalburn.
The 1935 closure of Stonehouse–Dalserf to passenger and freight traffic suggests that some passenger services used the route after 1905.
In 1947, weekday trains were 6, terminating at either Tillietudlem or Brocketsbrae.
In 1948, weekday trains were 3, terminating at either Brocketsbrae or Coalburn.

=== Accidents ===
1867: When the driver of a coal train, slowly passing the station, slipped on stepping to the ground, the engine wheels cut him in two.

1874: While shunting on the Cornsilloch Colliery siding about 100 yards (91 m) from the station, the passenger train from Stonehouse ran over two sleeping trespassers. One died from a crushed skull. The other suffered a mangled hand and serious injury to the opposite arm.

1877: A passing engine severed a pointsman's leg and he died a week later.

1878: While loading ballast stone, a jib crane fell on a worker, who later died of his injuries.

1886: A pack of hare-hunting hounds narrowly escaped total destruction near Ayr Road when an engine driver stopped his train before the pack was cut to pieces.

1889: Nearby, a passing train fatally struck a man walking along the line.

1890: Several runaway wagons smashed together in the vicinity, and the wreckage blocked the main line for several hours. The following month, while coupling a van, the buffers fatally caught a brakeman.

1891: During shunting from the Milburn Chemical Works, a worker slipped between the wagons and died of internal injuries an hour later.

1898: Appearing to have been knocked down by a passing train, the death of a signalman appeared suspicious.

1900: A porter was killed while uncoupling wagons.

1903: A light engine fatally struck a brakeman at the Millburn Colliery.

1908: While standing on a wagon, a brakeman lost two toes caught between the buffers.
