= Happendon railway station =

Disused railway station in Happendon, South Lanarkshire

Happendon
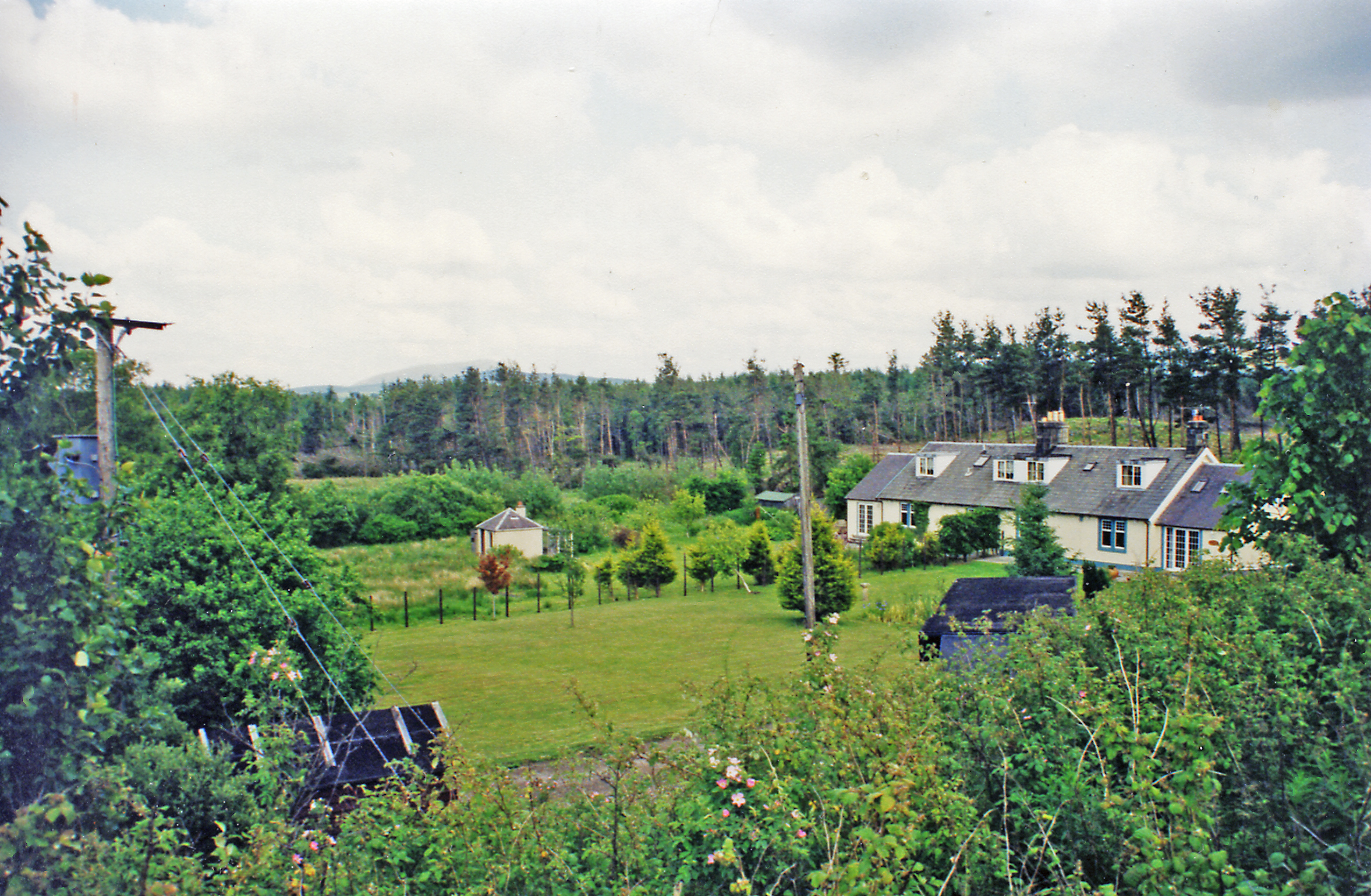
- The site of the station, looking north towards Carstairs, in 2000

General information
- Location: Happendon, South Lanarkshire; Scotland
- Coordinates: 55.5897°N 3.8273°W
- Grid reference: NS849344
- Platforms: 2

Other information
- Status: Disused

History
- Original company: Caledonian Railway
- Pre-grouping: Caledonian Railway
- Post-grouping: London, Midland and Scottish Railway; British Railways (Scottish Region)

Key dates
- 1 April 1864: Opened as Douglas
- 1 April 1931: Name changed to Happendon
- 5 October 1964: Closed
Location

Happendon railway station served the settlement of Happendon, South Lanarkshire, Scotland, from 1864 to 1964 on the Douglas Branch.

== History ==
The station was opened as Douglas on 1 April 1864 by the Caledonian Railway. It was a terminus until Muirkirk opened to the south. Although it was initially named Douglas, the village of the same name was 3 miles to the southwest. It had two signal boxes, one to the east end of the eastbound platform and the other behind the middle of the westbound platform. On the south side was the goods yard. The station's name was changed to Happendon on 1 April 1931. The station closed on 5 October 1964.

Preceding station	Disused railways	Following station
Ponfeigh; Line and station closed	Caledonian Railway; Douglas Branch	Douglas West; Line and station closed
