= Sandford, South Lanarkshire =

Village in Scotland

Coordinates: 55.663°N 4.04°W

Sandford
- Location within South Lanarkshire
- Population: 202
- Council area: South Lanarkshire
- Lieutenancy area: Lanarkshire
- Country: Scotland
- Sovereign state: United Kingdom
- Post town: STRATHAVEN
- Postcode district: ML10
- Dialling code: 01357
- Police: Scotland
- Fire: Scottish
- Ambulance: Scottish

Sandford is a village near Strathaven, South Lanarkshire in Scotland. It lies approximately 15 miles (24 km) southeast of Glasgow. It has 50 houses and 200 inhabitants. Sandford also has two parks The village is home to one of the oldest mills in Avondale.

The village is a part of Sandford and Upper Avondale Community Council. In 2002-3 the council was successful in winning a grant of £21,000 to restore a footpath between the village and the small town of Strathaven around 2 miles (3 km) away.
