= Ponfeigh railway station =

Disused railway station in Douglas Water, South Lanarkshire

Ponfeigh

General information
- Location: Douglas Water, Lanarkshire; Scotland
- Coordinates: 55.6096°N 3.7899°W
- Grid reference: NS873365
- Platforms: 1

Other information
- Status: Disused

History
- Original company: Caledonian Railway
- Pre-grouping: Caledonian Railway
- Post-grouping: London, Midland and Scottish Railway; British Railways (Scottish Region)

Key dates
- 1 April 1864: Opened
- 5 October 1964: Closed
Location

Ponfeigh railway station served the hamlet of Douglas Water, in the historical county of Lanarkshire, Scotland, from 1864 to 1964 on the Douglas Branch.

== History ==
The station was opened on 1 April 1864 on the Caledonian Railway. It was locally known as Rigside. The goods yard was in between the junction. It has a goods shed and a loading bank. The signal box was to the north of the platform. The station closed on 5 October 1964.

Preceding station	Disused railways	Following station
Sandilands; Line and station closed	Caledonian Railway; Douglas Branch	Happendon; Line and station closed
