= Netherburn =

Village in South Lanarkshire, Scotland

Coordinates: 55.707932°N 3.9106299°W

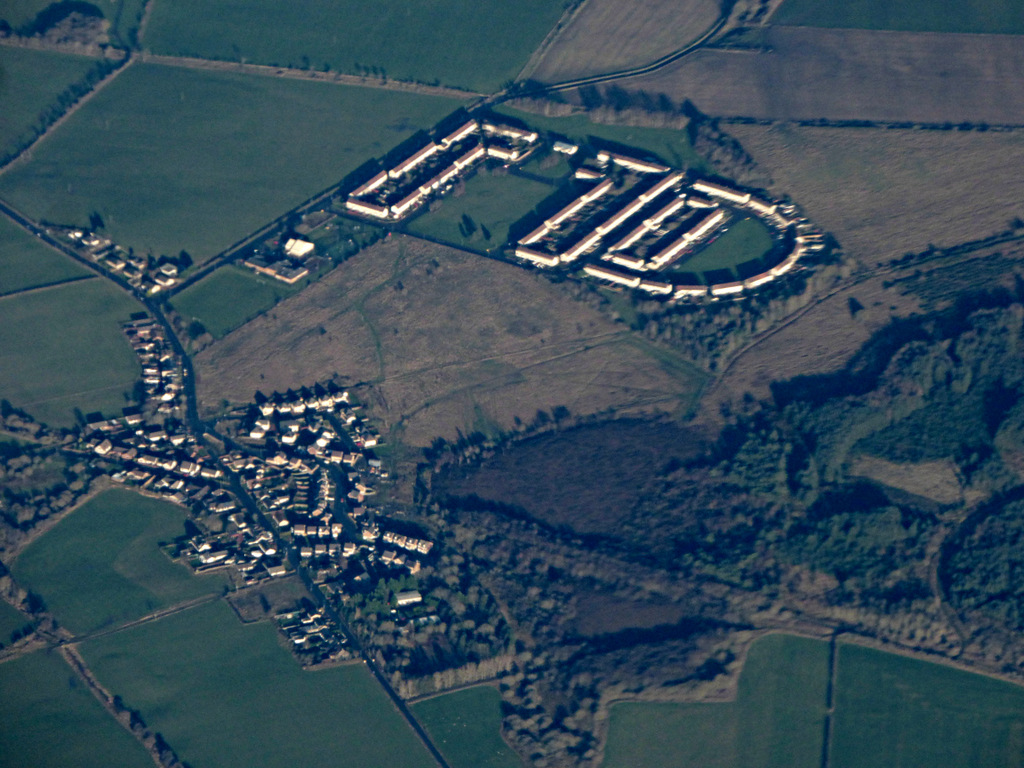
- Aerial view of Netherburn showing its two parts

- Location within South Lanarkshire
- Area: 0.288 km^{2} (0.111 sq mi)
- Population: 820 (2020)
  - Density: 2,847/km^{2} (7,370/sq mi)
- OS grid reference: NS8004147716
- Council area: South Lanarkshire
- Country: Scotland
- Sovereign state: United Kingdom
- Post town: LARKHALL
- Postcode district: ML9
- Police: Scotland
- Fire: Scottish
- Ambulance: Scottish

Netherburn is a rural village in the council area of South Lanarkshire, Scotland. In 2011 it had a population of 740. It is located four miles south east of Larkhall and within the historic parish of Dalserf.

== History ==
The village consists of two distinct parts: an older settlement at a crossroads consisting of some sandstone bungalows and a small development of large modern villas (the area is attractive to developers due to its proximity to the M74 motorway which has a junction 4 miles (6.4 km) from Netherburn via the larger village of Ashgill and the A71 road), and a separate cluster of post-World War II housing arranged in a symmetrical design with a common green at its centre. The local primary school (5 classes and nursery), previously located in the old part, has been rebuilt in the space between the two alongside the community centre, playpark and war memorial. The new school building opened in 2011. The local shop/post office is located in the newer part.

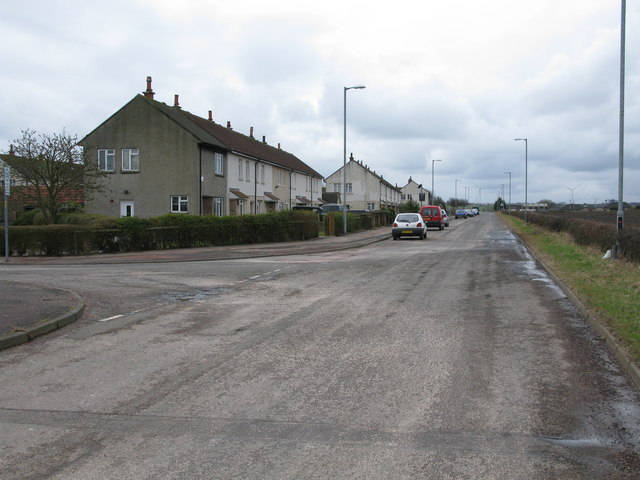
Typical housing in the newer part of the village

Netherburn once had a railway station. The station closed to passenger traffic in 1951 and the line closed in 1960. The station was demolished and the site and track area was developed for housing. The Humpback Bridge which carried the Draffan Road leading to Station Road is also demolished and the area developed for the Hamptons housing estate.

The village was the home of footballer brothers Willie and Jimmy McStay who both served as captain of Celtic F.C. in the 1920s.
