= Lanark Racecourse railway station =

Disused railway station in Lanark, South Lanarkshire

Lanark Racecourse

General information
- Location: Lanark, Lanarkshire; Scotland
- Coordinates: 55.6648°N 3.753°W
- Grid reference: NS898426
- Platforms: 2

Other information
- Status: Disused

History
- Original company: Caledonian Railway
- Pre-grouping: Caledonian Railway
- Post-grouping: London, Midland and Scottish Railway; British Railways (Scottish Region)

Key dates
- 27 September 1910: Opened
- 27 September 1964: Closed to passengers
- 15 January 1968: Closed to goods
Location

Lanark Racecourse railway station served the town of Lanark (specifically Lanark Racecourse), in the historical county of Lanarkshire, Scotland, from 1910 to 1968 on the Douglas Branch.

== History ==
The station was opened on 27 September 1910 by the Caledonian Railway, although it was used earlier for the airshow on 9 August 1910. It didn't appear in the timetable. It was used by the military as well as race goers. The signal box was situated on the northbound platform. 'Halt' was added to the station's name in the 1941 edition of the handbook of stations. The station closed to passengers on 27 September 1964. The signal box closed in 1965. The station continued to be used for goods traffic and military personnel until 15 January 1968. Only portions of the platforms remain. The rest of the site is overgrown.

Preceding station	Disused railways	Following station
Terminus	Caledonian Railway; Douglas Branch	Sandilands; Line and station closed
