= Muirkirk railway station =

Former railway station in Scotland

Muirkirk

General information
- Location: East Ayrshire; Scotland
- Coordinates: 55.5160°N 4.0647°W
- Grid reference: NS697266
- Platforms: 2

Other information
- Status: Disused

History
- Original company: Glasgow, Paisley, Kilmarnock and Ayr Railway
- Pre-grouping: Glasgow and South Western Railway
- Post-grouping: London, Midland and Scottish Railway

Key dates
- 9 August 1848: Opened
- Mid 1896: Re-sited
- 5 October 1964: Closed to passengers
- 7 February 1969: Closed for freight
Location

Muirkirk railway station was a railway station serving the village of Muirkirk, East Ayrshire, Scotland.

== First station ==
The station opened on 9 August 1848 as the terminus of a 10 miles 17 chains (16.4 km) longbranch line running from Auchinleck on the Glasgow, Paisley, Kilmarnock and Ayr Railway's (GPK&AR) Cumnock extension. (Note: Railways in the United Kingdom are, for historical reasons, measured in miles and chains. A chain is 22 yards (20 m) long, there are 80 chains to the mile.) The (GPK&AR) and the Glasgow, Dumfries and Carlisle Railway amalgamated on 28 October 1850 and the station then became part of the Glasgow and South Western Railway (G&SWR).

=== Early times ===
Initially the station was a very modest affair, the station building was positioned alongside a level crossing over Furnace Road, the single track line continued on to service some lime kilns. Slightly to the north of the crossing two lines ran into Muirkirk Ironworks the main source of freight in the area. The station probably only had one platform between the main running line and the goods yard situated to the south, there was a passing loop on the opposite side to allow locomotives to run around trains. The goods yard had a warehouse with two sidings connected with wagon turntables, there was also a two road engine shed with a turntable.

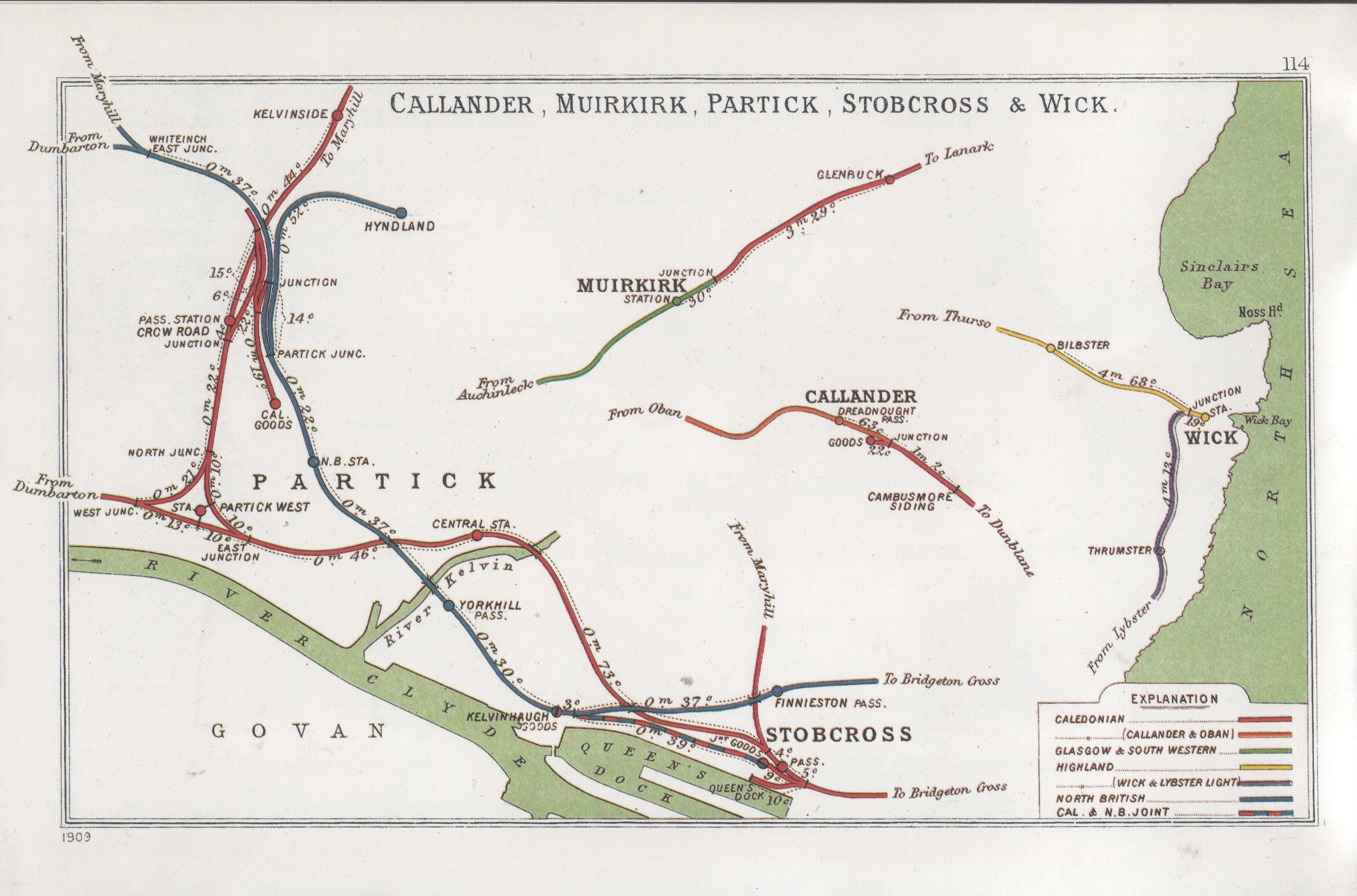
Railway Junctions in Callander, Muirkirk, Partick, Stobcross & Wick pre grouping

==== Services ====
On opening the station had three services from Glasgow Bridge Street via Kilmarnock, leaving Glasgow at 0730, 1330 and 1830, times of arrival were not published. (Note: It was quite usual to only publish departure times, it was only as the railway system developed and became more regular that companies felt able to publish intermediate, connection and arrival times.) Return journeys were at 0645, 1300 and 1745 with connections available to Ayr. By March 1850 these had been reduced to two services each way, those leaving Muirkirk were at 0710 and 1610. At this time the fare to Glasgow was 8s 9d in first class and 6s 6d in second, day tickets were available at a reduction of one-fourth from the usual fares. (Note: 8s 9d (£0 8s 9d) and 6s6d (£0 6s 6d) would be approximately £47.18 and £35 in 2019)

=== Joint station ===
The Caledonian Railway opened a line for freight from Douglas, South Lanarkshire to make an end-on connection slightly to the east of the station on 1 January 1873. The line was opened to passengers on 1 June 1874 when the station became a through station shared by both companies with the Caledonian Railway having running powers from Muirkirk Junction.

The delay in opening the Caledonian line to passengers may have been because the station facilities were inadequate, the Caledonian Railway noted this failing in September 1873, this may have been when the station was rebuilt. It was definitely rebuilt sometime before being re-sited in 1896. The station was enlarged with both the through lines to Glenbuck and the lines into Muirkirk Iron Works on overbridges, with the level crossing removed.

A larger station building had been built and there were two platforms, one each side of the now double track, connected with a footbridge, The goods yard had been extended and the engine shed was now four track with a larger turntable.

==== Services ====
In 1895 both the Glasgow and South Western Railway and the Caledonian Railway were running services to Muirkirk. The G&SWR services were to and from Glasgow St Enoch's, there were three weekday services from Glasgow each taking 2 to 2½ hours. In the opposite direction there were four trains.

The other services were marked as being run by both companies, there was a workman's train to and from Glenbuck, trains to Ayr which ran from Lanark and Glasgow Central, and trains from Ayr which ran to Edinburgh Princes Street, Sandilands and Carstairs. There was no Sunday service.

== Second station ==
The station was re-sited about 20 chains (1,300 ft; 400 m) eastward in 1896. The new station was to the east of Furnace Road and accessed by a service road to the south of the railway. There were two platforms either side of the running lines connected by a footbridge. The old station was re-used as a goods station. The goods yard was able to accommodate most types of goods including live stock, it was equipped with a three-ton crane.

== Decline and closure ==
In 1947 the LMS ran a regular weekday service to and from Auchinleck, Ayr and Lanark, there was one service on Saturdays only from Glasgow Central but none in the other direction. There was no Sunday service.

Passenger services from Auchinleck were withdrawn in 1950 and from Ayr in 1951. Services were withdrawn from Lanark, and the station closed to passengers on 5 October 1964, a casualty of the programme of closures advocated by the Beeching Report.

Freight services from Lanark closed at the same time as passenger services in 1964 but the line remained open for freight to the west until finally closing on 7 February 1969.

| Preceding station | Disused railways | Following station |
|---|---|---|
| Cronberry; Line and station closed | Glasgow and South Western Railway; Glasgow, Paisley, Kilmarnock and Ayr Railway | Glenbuck; Caledonian Railway; Line and station closed |
