= Bobby Crawford (footballer) =

Scottish footballer

Personal information
- Full name: Robert Crawford
- Date of birth: 4 February 1901
- Place of birth: Glespin, Scotland
- Date of death: 23 October 1965 (aged 64)
- Place of death: Preston, England
- Height: 5 ft 6 1/2 in (1.69 m)
- Position: Left half

Senior career*
Years	Team	Apps	(Gls)
- Glenbuck Cherrypickers
1921–1932	Preston North End	392	(17)
1932–1933	Blackpool	56	(5)
1934–1935	Blackburn Rovers	5	(0)
1936–1937	Southport	47	(1)
- Lancaster City
- * Club domestic league appearances and goals

Robert Crawford (4 February 1901 – 23 October 1965) was a Scottish professional footballer. A left half, he played in the Football League for Preston North End, Blackpool and Blackburn Rovers.
