= Bill Shaw (footballer, born 1886) =

Scottish footballer

Personal information
- Date of birth: 1886
- Place of birth: Muirkirk, Scotland
- Position: Half back

Senior career*
Years	Team	Apps	(Gls)
1905–1909	Kilmarnock	79	(3)
1909–1912	Bristol Rovers	103	(6)
1912–19??	Dumbarton Harp		
19??–19??	Cowdenbeath		
- * Club domestic league appearances and goals

William J. Shaw (born 1886) was a Scottish professional footballer who played for Kilmarnock, Bristol Rovers, Dumbarton Harp and Cowdenbeath.

Shaw joined Bristol Rovers from Kilmarnock in 1909 and went on to play 103 times in the Southern League for Rovers, scoring six goals, before moving to Dumbarton Harp in 1912.

== Sources ==
- Byrne, Stephen; Jay, Mike (2003). Bristol Rovers Football Club – The Definitive History 1883-2003. Stroud: Tempus. p. 492. ISBN 0-7524-2717-2.
