= Tillietudlem railway station =

Former Scottish railway station

Tillietudlem
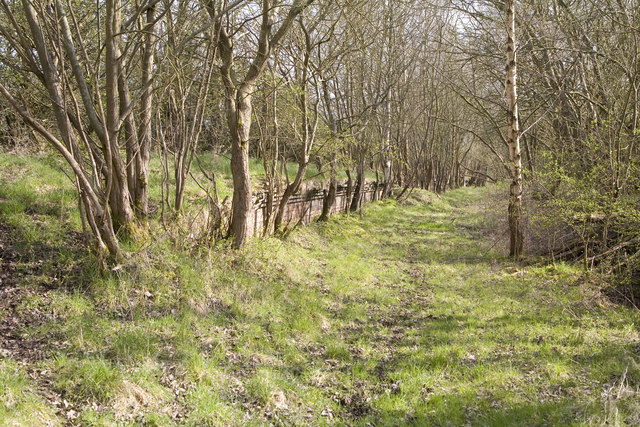
- The site of the station in 2006

General information
- Location: Tillietudlem, South Lanarkshire; Scotland
- Coordinates: 55.69139°N 3.89746°W
- Platforms: 2

Other information
- Status: Disused

History
- Original company: Caledonian Railway
- Pre-grouping: Caledonian Railway
- Post-grouping: London, Midland and Scottish Railway

Key dates
- 1 October 1876: Station opens
- January 1941: Station closes
- May 1945: Station re-opens
- 1 October 1951: Station closes
Location

Tillietudlem railway station served Tillietudlem, a village in South Lanarkshire, Scotland. It opened in 1876 and was closed in 1951.

Preceding station	Historical railways	Following station
Auchenheath	Caledonian Railway; Coalburn Branch	Netherburn
