= Chatelherault railway station =

Railway station in Scotland

Chatelherault
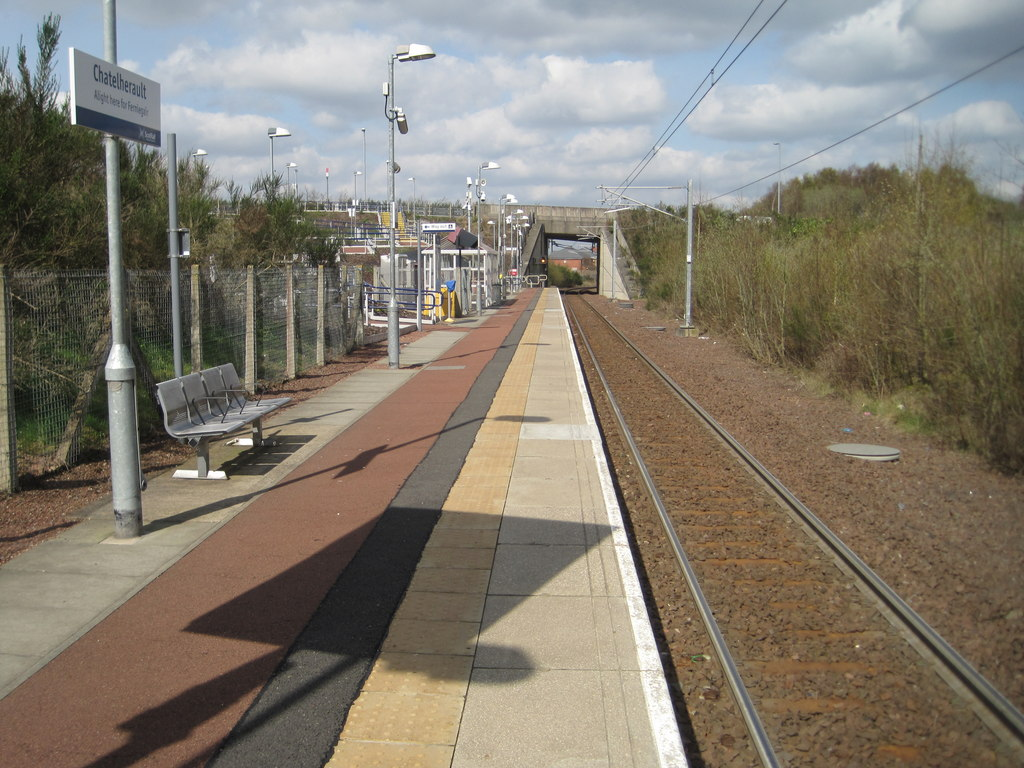

General information
- Location: Ferniegair, South Lanarkshire; Scotland
- Coordinates: 55.7651°N 4.0044°W
- Grid reference: NS743542
- Manager: ScotRail
- Transit authority: SPT
- Platforms: 1

Other information
- Station code: CTE

History
- Pre-grouping: Caledonian Railway

Key dates
- 1 December 1866: Opened as Ferniegair, as a terminus
- 2 October 1876: Relocated as a through station
- 1 January 1917: Closed
- 9 December 2005: Reopened

Passengers
- 2021/22: ▲45,960
- 2022/23: ▲61,912
- 2023/24: ▲73,122
- 2024/25: ▲76,190
- 2025/26: ▲78,432
Location
Notes
- Passenger statistics from the Office of Rail and Road

Chatelherault railway station serves the villages of Ferniegair and Allanton on the outskirts of Hamilton, South Lanarkshire, Scotland. It is named Chatelherault after the nearby Chatelherault Country Park.

== History ==
The station was opened as Ferniegair on 1 December 1866 as a terminus for trains approaching from the south on the Caledonian Railway's Coalburn Branch. Passengers for Glasgow had to transfer to Hamilton by coach. It was rebuilt and relocated as a through station on 2 October 1876, with trains continuing to Motherwell railway station on the Clydesdale Junction Railway. The Caledonian Railway closed the station on 1 January 1917, though the line itself continued to carry passengers until October 1965 and freight until 1968.

== Re-opening ==
The station is on the Argyle Line, and was officially re-opened on 9 December 2005 by First Minister Jack McConnell as part of the extension of the Argyle Line to include Larkhall.

== Services ==
From the re-opening in December 2005, trains ran on Mondays and Saturdays every 30 minutes north-west to Dalmuir via Singer and south to Larkhall. A trial (for one year) Sunday service commenced from December 2007 with an hourly service in each direction, and due to high uptake was made permanent in December 2008.

As of May 2016, the frequency remains unaltered, but northbound trains now run to Milngavie (southbound trains still start from Dalmuir). The hourly Sunday service runs to/from Balloch via Clydebank.

Preceding station	National Rail	Following station
Merryton	ScotRail; Argyle Line	Hamilton Central
	Historical railways	
Larkhall Central; Line and station open	Mid Lanark Lines; Caledonian Railway	Motherwell; Line and station open (except section between Chatelherault and Ross Junction)
Larkhall East; Line partially open; station closed	Coalburn Branch; Caledonian Railway	Motherwell; Line and station open (except section between Chatelherault and Ross Junction)
