= Rosebank, South Lanarkshire =

Coordinates: 55.726053°N 3.902508°W

Rosebank
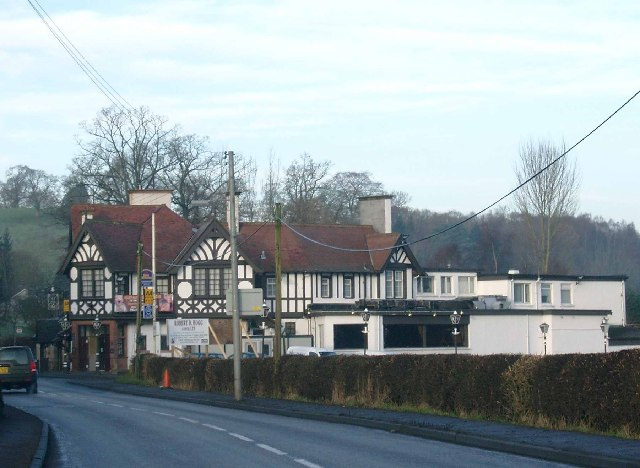
- The Popinjay Hotel, in Rosebank

- Location within South Lanarkshire
- OS grid reference: NS818523
- Council area: South Lanarkshire
- Lieutenancy area: Lanarkshire
- Country: Scotland
- Sovereign state: United Kingdom
- Post town: CARLUKE
- Postcode district: ML8
- Dialling code: 01555
- Police: Scotland
- Fire: Scottish
- Ambulance: Scottish
- UK Parliament: Hamilton and Clyde Valley
- Scottish Parliament: Hamilton, Larkhall and Stonehouse / Clydesdale

Rosebank is a small hamlet situated in South Lanarkshire, Scotland. With a population of around 200, Rosebank is one of the least-populated settlements in South Lanarkshire. The hamlet is situated on the banks of the River Clyde, and was constructed by Lord Newlands of Mauldslie Castle (which stood in the Mauldslie Woods area across the Clyde) for estate workers.

Rosebank does not have many features of note, with a handful of garden centres making up most of the hamlet (including the largest independent garden centre in the Clyde Valley area). However, the hamlet is home to the Popinjay Hotel, built by Lord Newlands in 1882 near the supposed site of the popinjay archery contest featured in Walter Scott's novel Old Mortality. It is now a large hotel that caters for tourists to Scotland and also serves nearby large settlements such as Glasgow.

== Nearby settlements ==
- Carluke – 5.0 miles (8.0 km)
- Garrion Bridge – 1.4 miles (2.3 km)
- Glasgow – 21.9 miles (35.2 km)
- Lanark – 6.9 miles (11.1 km)
- Larkhall – 3.9 miles (6.3 km)
- Wishaw – 4.5 miles (7.2 km)
