= ML postcode area =

Postcode area within the United Kingdom

Motherwell
- Postcode area
- Coordinates: 55.775°N 3.942°W
- Country: United Kingdom
- Postcode area: ML
- Postcode area name: Motherwell
- Post towns: 12
- Postcode districts: 12
- Postcode sectors: 55
- Postcodes (live): 9,653
- Postcodes (total): 11,712
- Statistics as at May 2020

The ML postcode area, also known as the Motherwell postcode area, is a group of twelve postcode districts in south-central Scotland, within twelve post towns. These cover most of North Lanarkshire (including Motherwell, Wishaw, Bellshill, Coatbridge, Airdrie and Shotts) and South Lanarkshire (including Hamilton, Carluke, Larkhall, Strathaven, Lanark and Biggar), plus very small parts of West Lothian, the Scottish Borders and Dumfries and Galloway.

Mail for the ML postcode area is processed at Glasgow Mail Centre, along with mail for the G, PA, KA and ZE postcode areas.

== Coverage ==
The approximate coverage of the postcode districts:

Postcode district	Post town	Coverage	Local authority area(s)
ML1	MOTHERWELL	Motherwell, Carfin, Cleland, Hareshaw, Holytown, New Stevenston, Newarthill, Newhouse	North Lanarkshire
ML2	WISHAW	Wishaw, Bonkle, Bogside, Garrion Bridge, Morningside, Overtown, Waterloo, Newmains	North Lanarkshire, South Lanarkshire
ML3	HAMILTON	Hamilton, Ferniegair, Limekilnburn, Quarter	South Lanarkshire, North Lanarkshire
ML4	BELLSHILL	Bellshill, Orbiston, Mossend	North Lanarkshire
ML5	COATBRIDGE	Coatbridge, Annathill, Glenboig	North Lanarkshire
ML6	AIRDRIE	Airdrie, Calderbank, Caldercruix, Chapelhall, Forrestfield, Gartness, Glenmavis, Greengairs, Plains, Riggend, Stand, Wattston	North Lanarkshire
ML7	SHOTTS	Shotts, Allanton, Eastfield, Harthill, Hartwood, Salsburgh, Greenrigg	North Lanarkshire, West Lothian
ML8	CARLUKE	Carluke, Kilncazdow, Law, Braidwood, Crossford, Rosebank	South Lanarkshire
ML9	LARKHALL	Larkhall, Netherburn, Stonehouse, Ashgill	South Lanarkshire
ML10	STRATHAVEN	Strathaven, Caldermill, Chapelton, Drumclog, Glassford, Sandford, Gilmourton, West Dykes Farm	South Lanarkshire
ML11	LANARK	Lanark, Auchenheath, Blackwood, Coalburn, Hazelbank, Kirkfieldbank, Kirkmuirhill, Lesmahagow	South Lanarkshire
ML12	BIGGAR	Biggar, Broughton, Leadhills, Symington, Wanlockhead	South Lanarkshire, Scottish Borders, Dumfries and Galloway

== Map ==
ML postcode area map, showing postcode districts in red and post towns in grey text, with links to nearby DG, EH, FK, G, KA and TD postcode areas.

== See also ==
- Postcode Address File
- List of postcode areas in the United Kingdom
