= Royal Albert F.C. =

Association football club in Scotland

Royal Albert
- Full name: Royal Albert Football Club
- Nicknames: The Larkies, The Royalists (as seniors); The Albert
- Founded: 1878
- Ground: Tileworks Park, Stonehouse
- Coordinates: 55°41′42″N 3°58′58″W
- Manager: David Sinclair
- League: West of Scotland League Third Division
- 2025–26: West of Scotland League Fourth Division, 2nd of 16 (promoted)
Home colours	Away colours

Royal Albert Football Club are a football club, historically based in the town of Larkhall, Scotland and are now playing in the nearby village of Stonehouse. Formerly a member of the Scottish Football League and the Scottish Junior Football Association, West Region, they now play in the West of Scotland League Third Division.

== History ==
The formation of the club dates back to 1878, when two Larkhall pit sides joined to form one team. These pits were owned by a Capt. Johns and he named the team after his boat the Royal Albert. The club spent over fifty years in Senior football, and qualified for the Scottish Cup on twenty occasions. Their greatest run came in the 1890–91 competition where they reached the fifth round before losing to Celtic in front of a record crowd of 5,000 at their Raploch Park ground. In the same season, centre half John Clelland became the clubs' one and only full Scotland international when he was capped against Ireland in March 1891. Royal Albert also have the distinction of scoring the first ever penalty kick in the history of football, James McLuggage scoring against Airdrieonians in a local cup tie on 6 June 1891 (four days after the rule was introduced by the International Football Association Board).

The club competed in various leagues such as the Scottish Football Federation, Scottish Football Alliance, Scottish Football Combination, Scottish Football Union and Western Football League before becoming a founder member of Scottish League Division Three in 1923. After the Third Division was abandoned in 1926, Albert briefly returned to the Scottish Football Alliance and Provincial Football League before being wound up in 1927 and re-forming as a Junior club the following year. The Royal Albert name continued to appear in the Scottish Qualifying Cup until 1936 and they qualified for the tournament on two further occasions, their last game being a 16–0 thrashing by Partick Thistle in January 1931.

Royal Albert initially competed in Junior football with some success and twice reached the semi-final of the Scottish Junior Cup in 1930 and 1940 but fared less well in modern times, with the club playing in the bottom tier of the Central Region/District league set-up for 45 consecutive seasons from 1972 until 2018. Albert won the last West of Scotland League Central District Second Division championship title in 2017–18 to qualify for the new SJFA West Region League One and in doing so, lifted the club's first honour for 81 years.

Some notable players in the Junior era to step up from the club include Bobby Hogg (Celtic) and John Martis (Motherwell) with both playing for Scotland later in their careers, George Miller, who won the Scottish Cup in 1961 with Dunfermline Athletic and Davie White who played for and managed Clyde before managing Rangers. Hogg is also Royal Albert's most capped Junior international with three caps in 1931,

The team have been managed since June 2016 by former player Jamie Nesbitt. Nesbitt succeeded Ian McCluskey, who had filled the role for the previous 12 years.

In October 2026, David Sinclair was appointed as first team manager.

== Ground ==
Albert's first ground was Raploch Park which was lost to a housing development in the 1960s. The club moved to the Robert Smillie Memorial Park in 1964 but were forced to vacate this ground at the end of the 2006–07 season as it was demolished in order to re-develop Larkhall Academy. The club ground-shared with local rivals Larkhall Thistle until 2013. After a proposed move to nearby Ashgill fell through, the club have moved to Tileworks Park, former home of Stonehouse Violet, on a permanent basis.

== Honours ==
=== Senior ===
- Scottish Football Federation
  - 1892–93
- Scottish Football Alliance
  - 1893–94
- Scottish Football Combination
  - 1903–04
- Scottish Qualifying Cup
  - 1921–22, 1923–24
- Western Cup
  - 1921–22, 1922–23
- Lanarkshire Cup
  - 1888–89, 1889–90, 1893–94, 1895–96
- Lanarkshire Consolation Cup
  - 1891–92, 1894–95
- Motherwell Charity Cup
  - 1885–86, 1887–88
- Airdrie Charity Cup
  - 1888–89, 1890–91
- Larkhall Charity Cup
  - 1889–90, 1892–93, 1893–94, 1906–07, 1909–10

=== Junior ===
- Lanarkshire Junior Football League
  - 1933–34, 1935–36, 1936–37
- West of Scotland League Central District Second Division
  - 2017–18

== See also ==
- Category:Royal Albert F.C. players
