= Ferniegair =

Village in Scotland

Coordinates: 55.767°N 4.009°W

- Location within South Lanarkshire
- OS grid reference: NS741545
- Council area: South Lanarkshire
- Lieutenancy area: Lanarkshire
- Country: Scotland
- Sovereign state: United Kingdom
- Post town: HAMILTON
- Postcode district: ML3
- Dialling code: 01698
- Police: Scotland
- Fire: Scottish
- Ambulance: Scottish
- UK Parliament: Lanark and Hamilton East
- Scottish Parliament: Hamilton, Larkhall and Stonehouse

Ferniegair is a village across the Avon Water from Hamilton, on the A72 road to Larkhall in South Lanarkshire, Scotland.

The village contains the entrance to Chatelherault Country Park and Hamilton Golf Club. The railway station was re-opened in late 2005 and named Chatelherault (the original Ferniegair station had closed in 1917). The M74 motorway passes a short distance north of the village, with the River Clyde further north from that.
