= Glenbuck railway station =

Former railway station in Scotland

Glenbuck
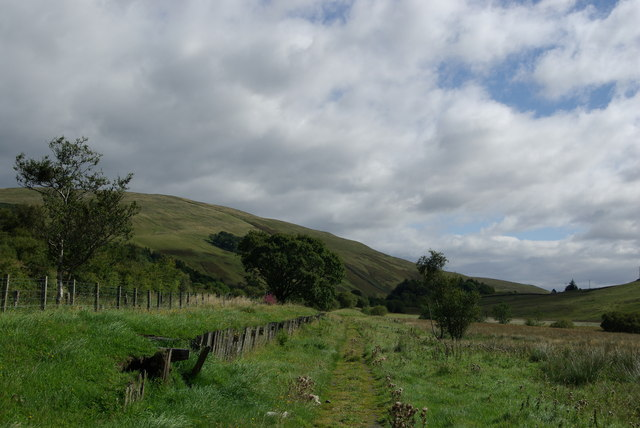
- Site of former Glenbuck station

General information
- Location: East Ayrshire; Scotland
- Coordinates: 55.5354°N 3.9837°W
- Grid reference: NS749286
- Platforms: 1

Other information
- Status: Disused

History
- Original company: Caledonian Railway
- Pre-grouping: Caledonian Railway
- Post-grouping: London, Midland and Scottish Railway

Key dates
- by October 1875: Opened
- 4 August 1952: Closed
Location

Glenbuck railway station served the village of Glenbuck in Ayrshire, Scotland.

== Opening ==
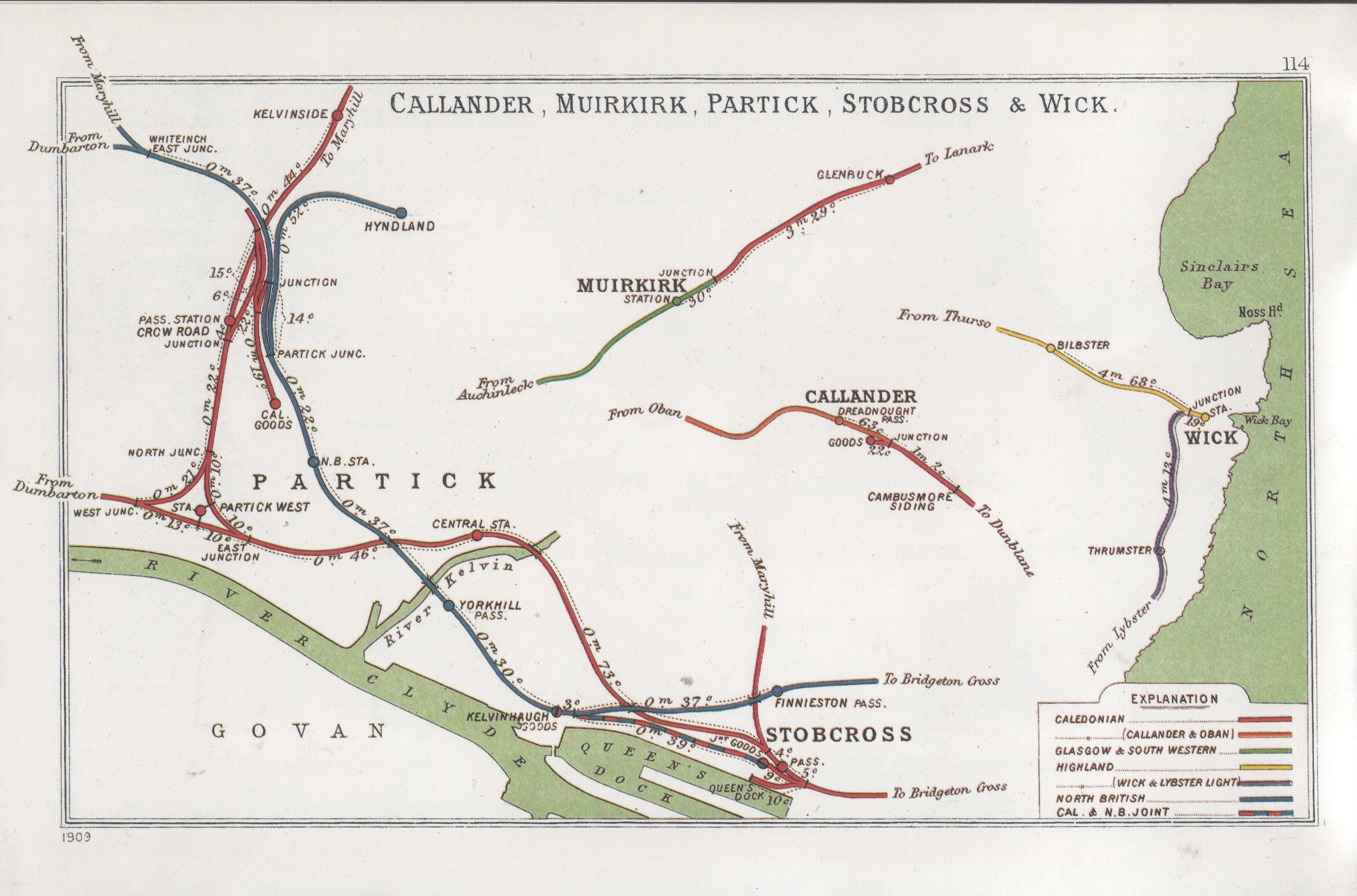
Railway Junctions in Callander, Muirkirk, Partick, Stobcross & Wick pre grouping (Glenbuck is top right)

The Caledonian Railway extended a line from Douglas to Muirkirk (on the Glasgow and South Western Railway), opening it for freight on 1 January 1873. The line was opened to passengers on 1 June 1874 with the Caledonian Railway having running powers from Muirkirk Junction to Muirkirk.

The station opened sometime before October 1875 as from that time it appeared in Bradshaw's timetables.

== Location ==
The station had a single platform to the north of the single track railway, two goods sidings to the west and one to the east all north of the running line. The siding to the east had been removed and one of the western ones extended by 1908.

To the east of the station the line went over a causeway skirting the edge of Glenbuck Loch.

== Closure ==
The station closed on 4 August 1952. The line remained open for passengers and freight until 5 October 1964, when it closed, a casualty of the programme of closures advocated by the Beeching Report.

Preceding station	Disused railways	Following station
Inches; Line and station closed	Caledonian Railway	Muirkirk; Glasgow and South Western Railway; Line and station closed
