= Brocketsbrae railway station =

Disused railway station in Brocketsbrae, South Lanarkshire

Brocketsbrae
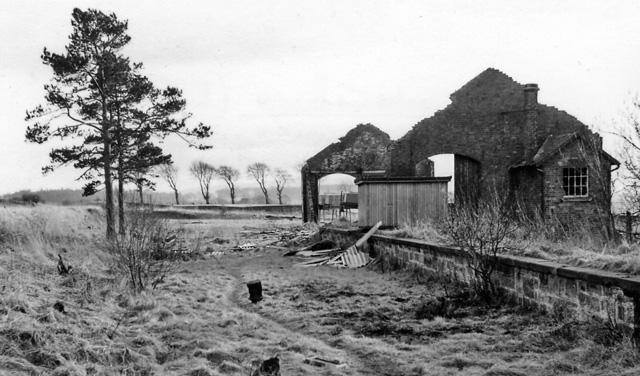
- The site of the station, looking south towards Coalburn, in 1970

General information
- Location: Brocketsbrae, South Lanarkshire; Scotland
- Coordinates: 55.6357°N 3.8713°W
- Grid reference: NS823396
- Platforms: 1

Other information
- Status: Disused

History
- Original company: Caledonian Railway
- Post-grouping: London, Midland and Scottish Railway; British Railways (Scottish Region)

Key dates
- 1 December 1866: Opened as Brocketsbrae
- 1 June 1869: Name changed to Lesmahagow
- 1 June 1905: Name changed back to Brocketsbrae
- 1 October 1951: Closed to passengers
- 21 September 1953: Closed to goods
Location

Brocketsbrae railway station served the hamlet of Brocketsbrae, South Lanarkshire, Scotland, from 1866 to 1951 on the Lesmahagow Junction to Bankend Colliery line.

== History ==
The station was opened on 1 December 1866 by the Caledonian Railway. Opposite the platform was the signal box, which opened in 1891. To the southwest was the goods yard and on the east side was an engine shed, also known as Brocketsbrae Shed. It was renamed Lesmahagow on 1 June 1869 but its name was changed back to Brocketsbrae on 1 June 1905, a month before the new Lesmahagow station opened. The station closed on 1 October 1951 but it remained open to goods traffic until 21 September 1953.

Preceding station	Disused railways	Following station
Auchenheath; Line and station closed	Caledonian Railway; Lesmahagow Junction to Bankend Colliery line	Alton Heights Junction; Line and station closed
