= Alton Heights Junction railway station =

Railway station in South Lanarkshire, Scotland

Coordinates: 55.619433°N 3.860648°W

Alton Heights Junction

General information
- Location: Auldton Heights, nr Lesmahagow, South Lanarkshire; Scotland
- Platforms: ?

Other information
- Status: Disused

History
- Original company: Caledonian Railway
- Post-grouping: London, Midland and Scottish Railway

Key dates
- By January 1893: Station opens
- After 1926: Station closes
Location

Alton Heights Junction railway station was a short-lived station located south of Lesmahagow in the Scottish county of South Lanarkshire.

== History ==
Opened by the Caledonian Railway, the station was not advertised in the public timetables and was intended solely for the use of workmen, probably those employed by the company in the sidings constructed south-east of the junction at the end of the 19th century. These sidings were used for marshalling and weighing wagons of coal from the several collieries in the Douglas and Coalburn areas. The Caledonian Railway became part of the London, Midland and Scottish Railway during the Grouping of 1923. This company then closed the station after roads were improved and more convenient local bus services became available. However, the junction signal box and the lines past it continued to operate until dates in the 1950s and 1960s.

Preceding station	Disused railways	Following station
Brocketsbrae; Line and station closed	Caledonian Railway; Mid-Lanark Lines	Auchlochan Platform; Line and station closed
Lesmahagow; Line and station closed	Caledonian Railway; Muirkirk and Lesmahagow Junction Railway	Douglas West; Line and station closed
