= Sandilands railway station =

Disused railway station in Lanark, South Lanarkshire

Sandilands

General information
- Location: Lanark, Lanarkshire; Scotland
- Coordinates: 55.6284°N 3.7615°W
- Grid reference: NS891386
- Platforms: 1

Other information
- Status: Disused

History
- Original company: Caledonian Railway
- Pre-grouping: Caledonian Railway
- Post-grouping: London, Midland and Scottish Railway

Key dates
- 1 April 1864: Opened
- 5 October 1964: Closed
Location

Sandilands railway station co-served the town of Lanark, in the historical county of Lanarkshire, Scotland, from 1864 to 1964 on the Douglas Branch.

== History ==
The station was opened on 1 April 1864 by the Caledonian Railway. It was named after the nearby Sandilands Farm. On the east side was the goods yard and in between the loop and the sidings was the signal box. This was replaced by a ground frame in 1937. The station closed on 5 October 1964.

Preceding station	Disused railways	Following station
Lanark Racecourse; Line and station closed	Caledonian Railway; Douglas Branch	Ponfeigh; Line and station closed
