= Glespin =

Coordinates: 55.53407°N 3.88918°W

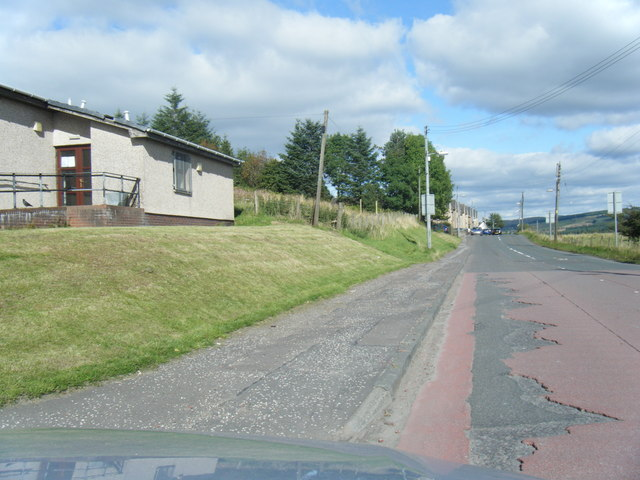
A70 road in Glespin, Glespin Community Hall on the left.

Glespin is a village in South Lanarkshire, Scotland. It is on the A70, east of Muirkirk and west of Douglas.

== Notable people ==
Footballer Bobby Crawford, who played almost 400 Football League games for Preston North End, was born in Glespin in 1901.
