= Netherburn railway station =

Former Scottish railway station

Netherburn

General information
- Location: Netherburn, South Lanarkshire; Scotland
- Coordinates: 55.70676°N 3.91089°W
- Platforms: 2

Other information
- Status: Disused

History
- Original company: Caledonian Railway
- Pre-grouping: Caledonian Railway
- Post-grouping: London, Midland and Scottish Railway

Key dates
- 1 December 1866: Station opens as Bents
- 1 May 1868: Renamed to Netherburn
- January 1941: Station closes
- May 1945: Station re-opens
- 1 October 1951: Station closes
Location

Netherburn railway station served Netherburn, a village in South Lanarkshire, Scotland. It opened in 1866 and was closed in 1951.

Preceding station	Historical railways	Following station
Tillietudlem	Caledonian Railway; Coalburn Branch	Dalserf
