= Muirkirk Enterprise Group =

Muirkirk Enterprise Group (MEG) was set up in 1999 with the aim of regenerating the rural village of Muirkirk which was, at one time, labelled the most socially deprived village in Scotland. The ongoing aim of MEG is to regenerate the whole village community to provide sustainability, respect and hope for the village for future generations.

== Issues MEG had to address ==
Muirkirk is a rural village set in the border of East Ayrshire and South Lanarkshire with a population of around 1800. At one time Muirkirk was a hive of industry with coal mining, rail connections and ironworks.

The demise of the mines brought widespread unemployment and the village suffered from relatively high levels of poverty. Muirkirk was rated as one of the most deprived areas of Scotland by the Scottish Index of Multiple Deprivation 2003. At that time the village experienced an unemployment rate of 30 per cent.

MEG identified a number of local issues in consultation with the local community. These included:

- A lack of community facilities, including provision for young people.
- A need for local training for work.
- A need for encouragement to seek work.
- A need to improve the local environment.
- The need to regenerate the local economy and attract inward investment.

== MEG's approach to the issues ==
Muirkirk Enterprise Group designed and developed a large number of projects to improve the physical appearance of the village, encourage tourists and visitors, increase employment opportunities, improve community safety and create a community where people want to live. Projects and developments include:

- Two community plantations complemented by a large number of paths and walkways.
- Two heritage parks with murals depicting the history of Muirkirk.
- Three totem poles depicting different aspects of community life.
- An audio tour guide of the village, the first of its kind in Scotland
- Two walks brochures promoting the series of walks prepared within the village.
- An Environmental Plastic Greenhouse cared for by local school children.
- Two bothies and a bird hide at Glenbuck Loch and the Walker's car park.
- The establishment of a caravan park with plans to build chalets to boost tourist accommodation.
- The refurbishment of buildings providing accommodation business and social purposes
- Support for a diverse range of groups and activities including a local learning group and a snooker club attracting young people.
- Construction of a skate board park designed in consultation with local young people
- An outdoor sports complex with facilities for tennis, volleyball, netball and basketball.

== Evidence of success ==
- Muirkirk is now a place where people want to live. While a few years ago it was almost impossible to sell houses in the area, now all houses that are on the market are sold almost immediately.
- A great improvement in the unemployment rate. In 2003, 30 per cent of the population was unemployed, by 2005 this figure had fallen to 10 per cent.
- The local crime rate has dropped dramatically in recent years.
- Promotion of the village as a tourism venue. It is anticipated that in 2006 around 5000 tourists will have visited Muirkirk to see the various attractions
- Muirkirk's regeneration has attracted private investment.
- Village features year on year in the Scottish Calor Gas Awards.

== Setting up the project ==
Muirkirk Enterprise Group was started as an offshoot from Muirkirk Community Council in an effort to regenerate Muirkirk. Most of the Community Councillors are members of the group, which was formed after a public meeting, and the group is composed of all sections of the community and all meetings are advertised and open to any members of the public to attend.

In the first instance, the group leased an empty East Ayrshire Council building for £1 a year inviting the East Ayrshire Action Team to come into the building and form a learning group to train people in computer skills. In 2014 current assets have risen from 2013's £19,710 to £25,926.

== Partnerships ==
The group is fully involved in partnership working with many public and private organisations including East Ayrshire Council, Scottish Natural Heritage, Scottish Coal, East Ayrshire Woodlands and Scottish Enterprise Ayrshire.
