= Hazelbank =

Three ships of the Bank Line were named Hazelbank:

- Hazelbank (1889 barque), wrecked in 1890
- SS Hazelbank, in service 1945–57
- MV Hazelbank, in service 1964–79
