= Kirkmuirhill =

Village in South Lanarkshire, Scotland

Coordinates: 55°39′56″N 3°55′10″W

- Location within South Lanarkshire
- Population: 4,380 (2020)
- Council area: South Lanarkshire
- Country: Scotland
- Sovereign state: United Kingdom
- Post town: LANARK
- Postcode district: ML11
- Police: Scotland
- Fire: Scottish
- Ambulance: Scottish

Kirkmuirhill is a village in South Lanarkshire, Scotland. It borders Blackwood, near Lanark and is sited near Junction 9 of the M74 motorway.

== History ==
In 1810 John Begg, husband of Robert Burns' youngest sister Isabella, became the land steward for Mr James Hope Vere MP on his estate at Blackwood. On 24 April 1813, after nearly three years at Blackwood, John met his death when his horse reared and fell on him, crushing him to death. He was returning from his regular trip to Lesmahagow market on a horse that he had been asked to ride because it had become fractious due to lack of exercise. Isabella was left a widow with nine children with ages from three to eighteen. For a while Mr James Hope Vere paid her a small annual grant however to make ends meet she opened a dame's school in Kirkmuirhill which she ran for four years before moving to Ormiston.

== Amenities ==
=== Churches ===
There are a number of Christian congregations within the village. These include Kirkmuirhill Parish Church of Scotland; Hope Church: Blackwood & Kirkmuirhill Free Church of Scotland, Our Lady & St John's Catholic Church and Kirkmuirhill Gospel Hall.

== Bibliography ==
1. Begg, Robert Burns (1891). Memoir of Isobel Burns. Privately printed.
