= Muirkirk =

Village in East Ayrshire, Scotland

Coordinates: 55°31′19″N 4°04′00″W

Muirkirk: Scottish Gaelic: Eaglais an t-Slèibh
- Village
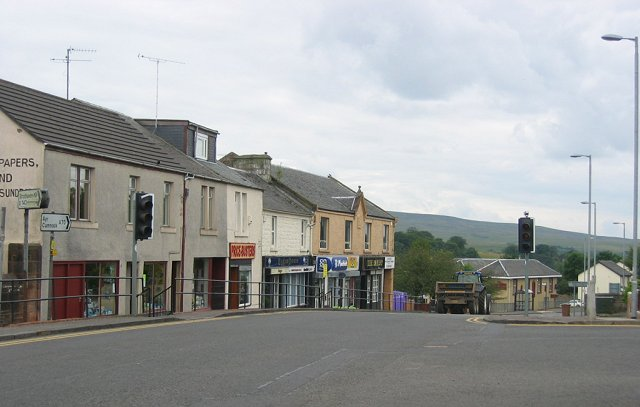
- Muirkirk main street, showing the junction at the centre of the village

- Location within East Ayrshire
- Population: 1,340 (2020)
- Language: English; Scots
- OS grid reference: NS697274
- Council area: East Ayrshire
- Lieutenancy area: Ayrshire and Arran
- Country: Scotland
- Sovereign state: United Kingdom
- Post town: CUMNOCK
- Postcode district: KA18
- Dialling code: 01290
- Police: Scotland
- Fire: Scottish
- Ambulance: Scottish
- UK Parliament: Kilmarnock and Loudoun
- Scottish Parliament: Carrick, Cumnock and Doon Valley

Muirkirk (Scottish Gaelic: Eaglais an t-Slèibh) is a small village in East Ayrshire, southwest Scotland. It is located on the north bank of the River Ayr, between Cumnock and Glenbuck on the A70.

== Conservation ==
The Muirkirk & North Lowther Uplands Special Protection Area was set up to protect the populations of breeding hen harrier (Circus cyaneus), golden plover (Pluvialis apricaria), merlin (Falco columbarius), peregrine falcon (Falco peregrinus) and short-eared owl (Asio flammeus).

== Population ==
As of 2022, the estimated population of Muirkirk is 1,324.

== History ==
The village developed around its church, which was built in 1631, and was a fertile recruiting ground for the Covenanter movement.

The village partook in curling since at least 1750, and has one of the earliest written accounts of this, by the minister, Rev John Sheppard.

In recent times, the village has fallen into decline due to its geographic isolation and the collapse of its coal and iron industries, but attempts are being made at regeneration through the Muirkirk Enterprise Group which was set up in 1999.

== Notable people ==
- Jocky Dempster, former professional footballer with Queen of the South F.C., St Mirren and Clyde F.C.
- Danny Masterton, footballer with Ayr United and Clyde, lived almost his whole life in Muirkirk.
- Willie Ferguson, professional footballer with Chelsea F.C. and Queen of the South F.C.
- John Lapraik, poet
- John Loudon McAdam, who developed his system of road laying in Muirkirk
- Isobel Pagan (Tibby) - poet
- Bill Shaw, pre-war footballer
- Prof Sir Tom Symington, pioneer in Cancer research
- Alan Gebbie, professional footballer with St Mirren F.C. and Aldershot F.C.
- Cameron Menzies - darts player
