= Blackwood, South Lanarkshire =

Village in South Lanarkshire, Scotland

Coordinates: 55.667146°N 3.916454°W

Blackwood: Scottish Gaelic: An Coille Dubh
- Location within South Lanarkshire
- Population: 4,380 (2020) (Note: Includes neighbouring Kirkmuirhill)
- Council area: South Lanarkshire
- Lieutenancy area: Lanarkshire
- Country: Scotland
- Sovereign state: United Kingdom
- Post town: LANARK
- Postcode district: ML11
- Dialling code: 01555
- Police: Scotland
- Fire: Scottish
- Ambulance: Scottish
- UK Parliament: Hamilton and Clyde Valley
- Scottish Parliament: Clydesdale

Blackwood is a village which borders Kirkmuirhill, near Lanark in the central belt of Scotland. It has a few small shops, a Roman Catholic church and a couple of primary schools.

== Location ==
Blackwood sits adjacent to the M74 motorway - Scotland's main arterial route South to England - but remains a quiet village and a much sought-after place to stay. Blackwood is linked to (and physically runs into) the neighbouring village of Kirkmuirhill, so-much-so that there is no physical sign of where one starts and the other ends, although many argue that the line is drawn just parallel to the row of shops.

== Local life ==
=== Churches ===
Kirkmuirhill Church of Scotland (technically in neighbouring Kirkmuirhill), Hope Church Blackwood & Kirkmuirhill (Free Church of Scotland), St. John's R.C. Church and Kirkmuirhill Gospel Hall look after the spiritual needs of villagers.

=== Schools ===
There are two primary schools, St. John's R.C. Primary School and Blackwood Primary School. However there is a third school, Bent Primary, on the outskirts of the villages.

== History of Blackwood Estate ==
Blackwood sits at the top of the gentle hills on the Western/Southern side of the picturesque Clyde Valley, at the point where the River Nethan sweeps down into the steep valley to join the River Clyde. Close by is Craignethan Castle, where Mary Queen of Scots stayed on her journey South to be tried and executed by Elizabeth I of England.

Sited on the main route South from Glasgow to Carlisle, both Kirkmuirhill and Blackwood benefited from the traffic passing through although by far the largest employer in this largely rural area in the 18th and early 19th centuries would have been the Blackwood Estate. Blackwood was (arguably) originally the farming cousin to other local villages, where coal mining was the dominant industry. Blackwood estate provided farming work for local families. The Blackwood Estate, seat of the Weir de Veres since the thirteenth century, afterwards the Hope-Veres, was the most extensive estate in the parish of Lesmahagow and by some accounts the largest estate in the County of Lanark.

=== Isabella Burns ===
Gilbert Burns, brother of the poet had been the land steward at Blackwood before moving to Morham Mains in East Lothian. In 1810 John Begg, husband of Robert Burns youngest sister Isabella Burns, became the land steward for Mr James Hope Vere MP on his estate at Blackwood. On 24 April 1813, after nearly three years at Blackwood, John met his death when his horse reared and fell on him, crushing him to death. He was returning from his regular trip to Lesmahagow market on a horse that he had been asked to ride because it had become fractious due to lack of exercise. Isabella was left a widow with nine children with ages from three to eighteen. For a while Mr James Hope Vere paid her a small annual grant however to make ends meet she opened a dame's school in Kirkmuirhill which she ran for four years before moving to Ormiston.

== Railway station ==
The arrival of the railways into the area in 1856 with the opening of the station at Blackwood, resulted in an expansion of mining but the deep pits in the immediate vicinity seem to have had a short lifespan and were worked out fairly rapidly. Surface mining lasted a little longer but by the mid-20th century, mining was no longer a major employment option in the region.

== Blackwood today ==
Despite this the two villages of Blackwood and Kirkmuirhill seem to have proved pleasant places to live and both enjoyed a major building boom during the 20th century. In 1901 Blackwood had 167 houses and Kirmuirhill 121. By the year 2000 they had a combined total of 1480 and the villages had merged such that it is hard to tell where one ends and the other begins.

More recently, a holy grail novel has been inspired by the village of Blackwood. Based on a true story which follows the descendants of the holy bloodline from France in 1066 to South Lanarkshire, where the grail treasure is believed to be buried.

== Bibliography ==
- James Hamilton, Old Blackwood and Kirkmuirhill, Stenlake Publishing, (2000)
- George Vere Irving, The Upper Ward of Lanarkshire, T. Murray and Son, (1864)
- Robert Burns Begg (1891). Memoir of Isobel Burns. Privately printed for the family .
