= Larkhall =

Town in South Lanarkshire, Scotland

Larkhall: Scottish Gaelic: Taigh na h-Uiseig
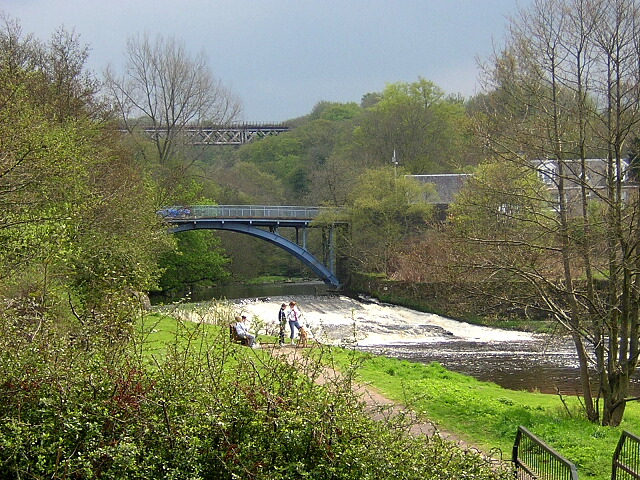
- Millheugh Bridge and the Larkhall Viaduct

- Location within South Lanarkshire
- Population: 15,308 (2022)
- OS grid reference: NS7651
  - Edinburgh: 34 mi (55 km)
  - London: 332 mi (534 km)
- Civil parish: Dalserf
- Council area: South Lanarkshire
- Lieutenancy area: Lanarkshire
- Country: Scotland
- Sovereign state: United Kingdom
- Post town: LARKHALL
- Postcode district: ML9
- Dialling code: 01698
- Police: Scotland
- Fire: Scottish
- Ambulance: Scottish
- UK Parliament: Hamilton and Clyde Valley
- Scottish Parliament: Hamilton, Larkhall and Stonehouse

Larkhall (Scottish Gaelic: Taigh na h-Uiseig) is a town in South Lanarkshire, Scotland, around 14 miles (23 km) southeast of Glasgow. Larkhall sits on high ground between the River Clyde to the East and the Avon Water to the West. Larkhall sits on the edge of the scenic Clyde valley and is a commuter town for Glasgow.

Larkhall had a population of 15,308 in 2022, and is a typical Scottish former industrial town. Traditionally a mining, weaving and textile area, most of Larkhall's traditional industries have now closed down, including the Lanarkshire ironworks.

== Toponym ==
The name Larkhall or Laverock Ha first appears in journals around 1620. The origins of the name are unknown, although Laverock is the Scots word for skylark. However, there is no evidence that the town is named after the bird. It is more likely that Laverock was a surname. The name for Larkhall was originally a Scots word Laverockhaugh (Laverockha), which meant laverock - skylark and haugh - boggy/wet area.

== History ==
One of the town's most notable historical landmarks is the Morgan Glen viaduct standing over the Avon Water. The viaduct was built between 1898 and 1904 for the Caledonian Railway company by Sir William Arrol & Co. It spans some 285 yards (261 m), and at a height of 175 feet (53 m), it is the tallest viaduct in Scotland. The viaduct is in a state of disrepair since the closure of the railway line in 1965 and is closed to public access for safety reasons. In the 1990s, the viaduct was under the threat of dismantling but was protected by a local heritage group. The viaduct is Category B listed. It is currently on the Buildings at Risk Register for Scotland.

Glenview memorial fountain is a local fountain and artwork in the town, originally produced by the Saracen Foundry.

On 22 December 1999 a large gas explosion took place in the town which resulted in the death of four people. In Transco plc v HM Advocate Transco were subsequently found guilty of culpable homicide and fined £15 million in 2004.

== Education ==
The primary schools in Larkhall are Machanhill Primary School, Dalserf Primary School, Glengowan Primary School, Hareleeshill Primary School, Craigbank Primary School, Netherburn Primary School and Robert Smillie Memorial Primary School. There is also a Catholic primary school, St Mary's. The town's sole secondary school is Larkhall Academy.

== Religion ==
The Church of Scotland has most adherents at 7,416 persons (49.6% of the population). The 2011 census notes there are 1,247 Roman Catholics living in the town (8.3% of the population).

Larkhall contains eight churches: Chalmers Parish Church, The Church At The Cross, Larkhall Baptist Church, Larkhall Congregational Church, St. Machan's Parish Church, St. Mary's R.C. Church, Strutherhill Gospel Hall and Trinity Parish Church. There is also a Kingdom Hall of Jehovah's Witnesses.

== Transport ==
Trains returned to the town in December 2005, with the opening of the new Larkhall railway station, which is a terminus on the Argyle Line. The station provides regular services to Glasgow and beyond. Merryton railway station serves the northern end of town and is also on the Argyle Line.

Larkhall also has good bus links with frequent services to Hamilton, Lanark, Motherwell, Stonehouse, Strathaven and Wishaw.

Scotland's main motorway, the M74 skirts the eastern edges of the town. Larkhall has 2 motorway intersections: Junction 7 with the A72, which is for southbound traffic only, and Junction 8 with the A71, which is for both northbound and southbound traffic. Junction 8 is known locally as Canderside Toll or The Toll. The centre of Glasgow can be reached in 20 minutes; Edinburgh is around 50 minutes away.

== Sport ==
Because of the Protestant majority, residents mainly support Rangers F.C., to the point where it was noted in 2008 that the colour green—which is associated with that team's rivals Celtic F.C.—is avoided by retailers. However, community leaders attributed any trouble to a small number of vandals. A local authority study in 2017 found that sectarianism was not a major issue in the town.

The town has two Junior Football teams: Larkhall Thistle F.C. and Royal Albert F.C. although Royal Albert now play in Stonehouse, a neighbouring village while Larkhall Thistle play at Gasworks Park on Raploch Street. Royal Albert were once a full member of the Scottish Football League but now ply their trade, as do Larkhall Thistle, in the Third Division (fourth tier) of the West of Scotland Football League. Also present in the town is Larkhall United Junior Football Club.

The town also has its own 9 hole municipal Golf Course which was founded in 1909.

=== Athletics ===
Larkhall also has a Running & Athletics club, Larkhall YMCA Harriers. Established in 1930 they are one of Scotland's longest established Running & Athletics Club. Based in Larkhall, South Lanarkshire, over the years their members have performed with distinction at District, Inter-Districts, Scottish, British and International level, including the Olympic Games. The most famous and successful member being David Gracie who represented Team GB at the Helsinki Olympic Games in the 400 Hurdles. The Harriers train from their base, the Larkhall YMCA Hall on Caledonian St, Larkhall and other surrounding sports facilities. Their members are drawn from Larkhall and the surrounding towns and villages of Stonehouse, Ashgill, Netherburn, Blackwood, Kirkmuirhill, Lesmahagow, Strathaven, Ferniegair, Glassford, Lanark and beyond. The club colours are Red and White and they compete in Red vests with two White horizontal hoops. Larkhall YMCA Harriers cater for athletes from Age 5 with no upper age limit and compete in Road Racing, Track & Field and Cross Country.

== Notable people ==
Larkhall is home to snooker player and 2006 World Snooker Championship winner Graeme Dott and 2001 and 2025 Scottish Snooker Champion Gary Thomson and his wife professional snooker referee Agnieszka Thomson. Previous residents include footballers Paul McStay; Jim McLean and his brother Tommy McLean come from a village called Ashgill next to Larkhall. Other high-profile former residents include actress Una McLean.

=== David Keir Gracie ===
David Keir Gracie, (26 January 1927 – 26 October 2020) Olympian and member of Larkhall YMCA Harriers. Gracie moved to Larkhall as a young child in the mid 1930's and after leaving the Royal Marines in 1947 he Joined the Larkhall YMCA Harriers where he discovered his love for athletics. He competed in the men's 400 metres hurdles at the 1952 Summer Olympics. Amongst his other achievements, In 1953 he won the World University Games 400m Hurdles title in Dortmund, Germany. He was also part of the Team GB Quartet who won the silver medals in the 4x400m relay at the same event. Gracie died in October 2020 at the age of 93.

=== Black lady ===
The black lady of Larkhall is a local ghost story. She was said to be the Indian servant of Captain Henry McNeil Hamilton, the last owner of Broomhill House (55°43′59.03″N 3°59′4.78″W) who was brought to Larkhall by Captain McNeil after one of his many seafaring voyages. She was happy with her new life but her ignorance of Scottish customs made her a social outcast. The Captain forbade her to leave Broomhill House during the day. Soon she was not seen at night either and the Captain claimed she had disappeared, but locals were suspicious. She is said to have returned, as her ghostly form appeared in the windows of Broomhill House and then later in Morgan Glen. The Captain is said to have died prematurely.

When Broomhill House fell into disrepair the 500 long hundredweight (25,000 kg) door lintel was moved down to the Applebank public house on Millheugh road by a large group of men. The next day it was said to be found lying across the road from the public house. In the 1960s a team from the Tonight programme visited Larkhall as they tried to perform the first televised exorcism. The cameras were frozen over in fine weather and after filming finished the director was killed in a road crash on his way to another location. He was found with a fence post impaled in his heart.

== Twin town ==
Larkhall is twinned with:

- Seclin, Nord, France
