= Ashgill =

Village in South Lanarkshire, Scotland

Coordinates: 55.7288°N 3.9312°W

- Location within South Lanarkshire
- Population: 1,370 (2020)
- OS grid reference: NS7849
- Council area: South Lanarkshire
- Lieutenancy area: Lanarkshire
- Country: Scotland
- Sovereign state: United Kingdom
- Post town: LARKHALL
- Postcode district: ML9
- Dialling code: 01698
- Police: Scotland
- Fire: Scottish
- Ambulance: Scottish
- UK Parliament: Lanark and Hamilton East
- Scottish Parliament: Hamilton, Larkhall and Stonehouse

Ashgill is a village in South Lanarkshire, Scotland near Larkhall. It is part of the Dalserf parish. The village church dates back to 1889.

It is twinned with Saint-Cirq-Lapopie in France.

The village has a shop, a chip shop and a hairdresser. The village had a small William Low supermarket until 1996.

Urban legend states a property in the village's Clyde view area contains the remains of a wicked witch ‘’old Liz Troll-land’’ of whom is said to troll the boundary of her land to this day.

== Famous residents ==
- Jim McLean Scottish football player
- John Anderson TV personality
