= Lesmahagow Railway =

Railway line in Scotland

Coordinates: 55.6436°N 3.8855°W

Caledonian Railway (Lesmahagow Branches) Act 1847
- Act of Parliament
- Parliament of the United Kingdom
- Long title: An Act to enable the Caledonian Railway Company to make Branches from the Clydesdale Junction Railway to the Douglas and Lesmahagow Mineral Fields, and to Strathavon.
- Citation: 10 & 11 Vict. c. xxiv

Dates
- Royal assent: 8 June 1847

Text of statute as originally enacted

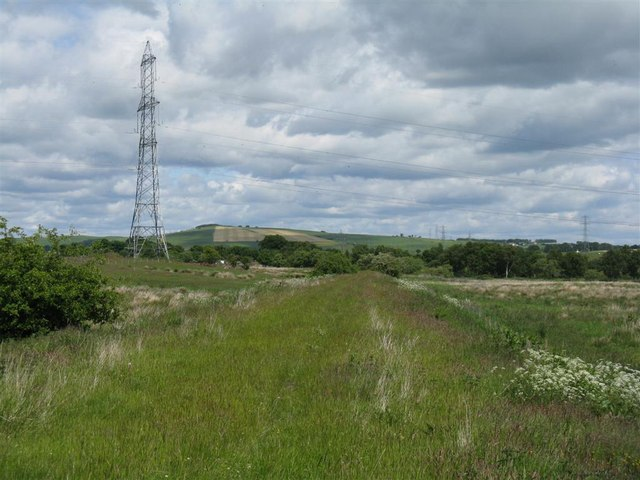
Dismantled railway on moorland between Lesmahagow and Coalburn

Caledonian Railways (Lesmahagow Branches) Act 1851
- Act of Parliament
- Parliament of the United Kingdom
- Long title: An Act to enable the Caledonian Railway Company to provide for the Construction of certain Branch Railways in the County of Lanark.
- Citation: 14 & 15 Vict. c. xcix

Dates
- Royal assent: 24 July 1851

Other legislation
- Amended by: Caledonian Railway (Lesmahagow Branches) Act 1854

Text of statute as originally enacted

Caledonian Railway (Lesmahagow Branches) Act 1854
- Act of Parliament
- Parliament of the United Kingdom
- Long title: An Act for altering the Lines authorized by the Caledonian Railway (Lesmahagow Branches) Act, 1851, and for otherwise amending that Act.
- Citation: 17 & 18 Vict. c. clvi

Dates
- Royal assent: 10 July 1854

Other legislation
- Amends: Caledonian Railway (Lesmahagow Branches) Act 1851

Text of statute as originally enacted

Caledonian Railway (Lesmahagow Branches) Act 1860
- Act of Parliament
- Parliament of the United Kingdom
- Long title: An Act for more completely merging in the Undertaking of the Caledonian Railway Company certain Railways known as the Lesmahagow Branches; for incorporating the Holders of the Lesmahagow Branches Stock, and securing to them a fixed Annuity; and for other Purposes.
- Citation: 23 & 24 Vict. c. xcvii

Dates
- Royal assent: 14 June 1860

The Lesmahagow Railway, south of Glasgow in Scotland, was developed by a company known as The Lesmahagow Branches (later known as The Lesmahagow Guarantee Company). It was not an independent company in the usual sense. It was a financially independent, self-contained unit within the framework of the Caledonian Railway (CR). The shareholders and officers of both companies were mainly the same people. The line was built largely to transport the vast amount of coal being produced by the many mines in the area. Authority to build the line was given in the Caledonian Railway (Lesmahagow Branches) Act 1847 (10 & 11 Vict. c. xxiv) but construction did not commence till 1854. In 1856 the line was opened in stages. Later there was found to be a demand for passenger services which commenced in 1868. In 1923, with the grouping, the CR amalgamated with several other companies to form the London, Midland and Scottish Railway (LMS) which, following nationalisation in 1947, became part of British Railways.

== Branches ==
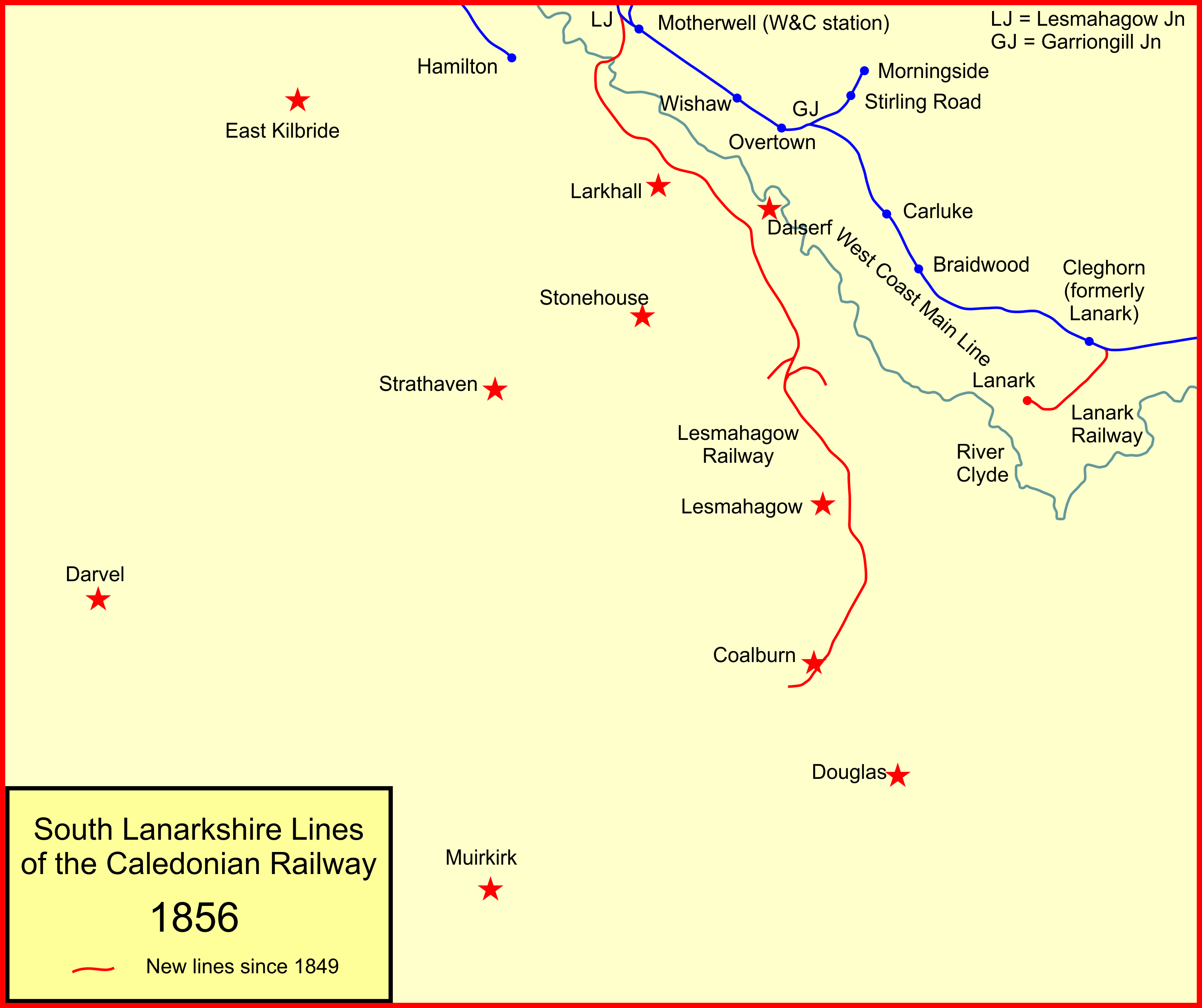
The railway network, 1856

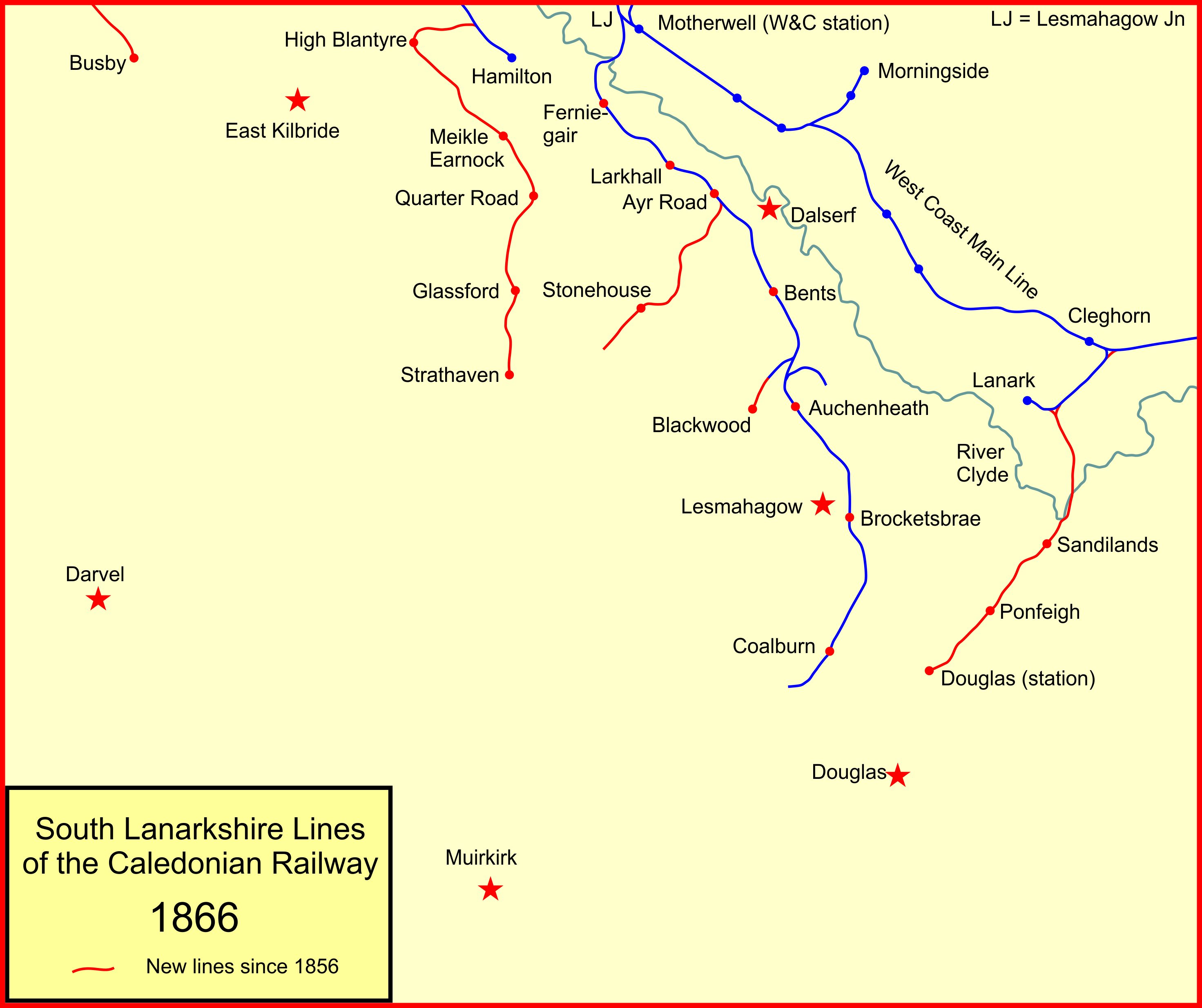
The railway network, 1866

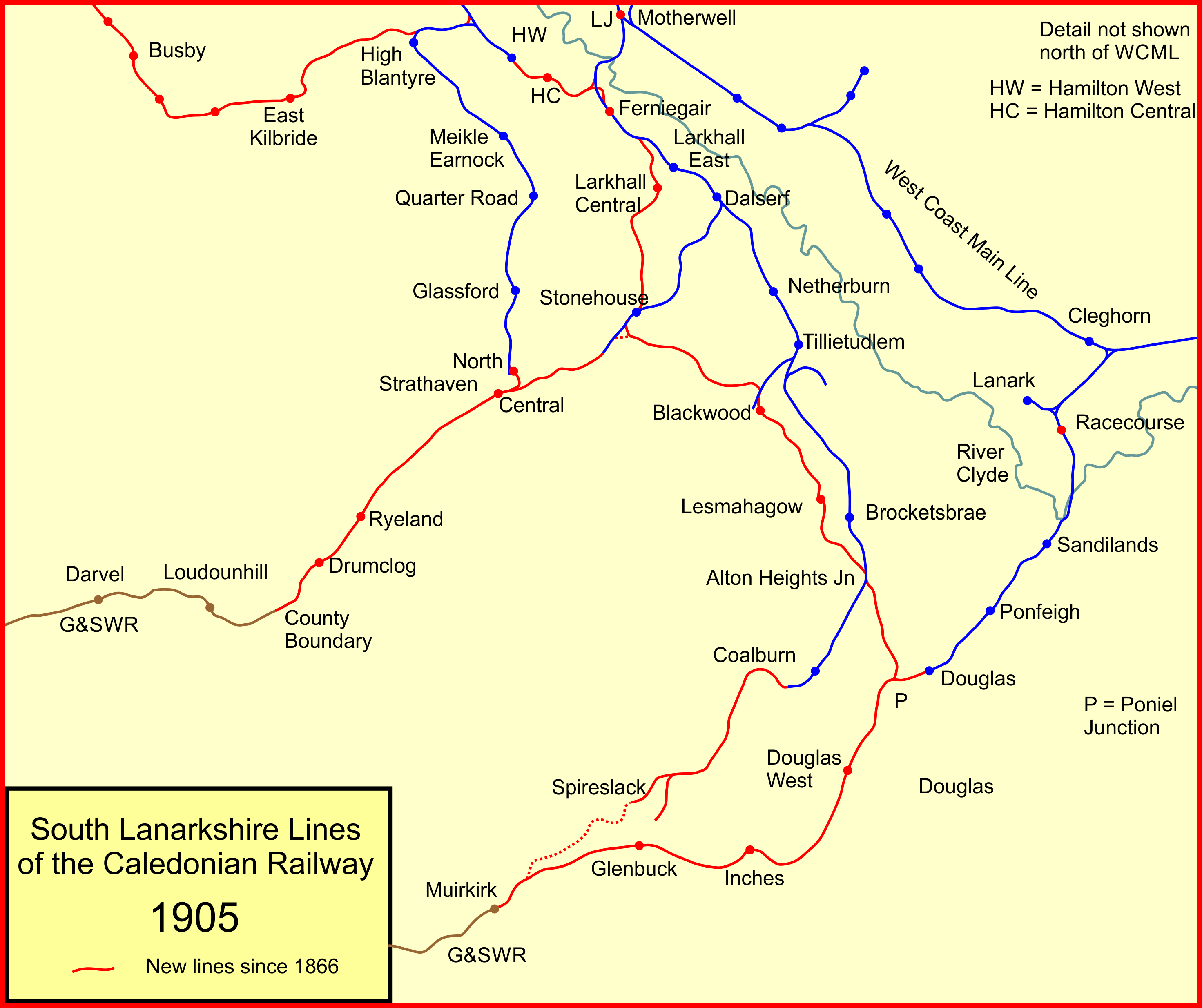
The railway network, 1905

=== Coalburn Branch ===
From Lesmahagow railway station to Bankend railway station.

=== Stonehouse Branch ===
Separates from the Coalburn branch at Dalserf Junction.

=== Blackwood Branch ===
Separates from the Coalburn branch at Southfield Junction.

=== Swinhill Branch ===
Built for Swinhill Colliery, the branch reaches Stonehouse Junction.

== Construction ==
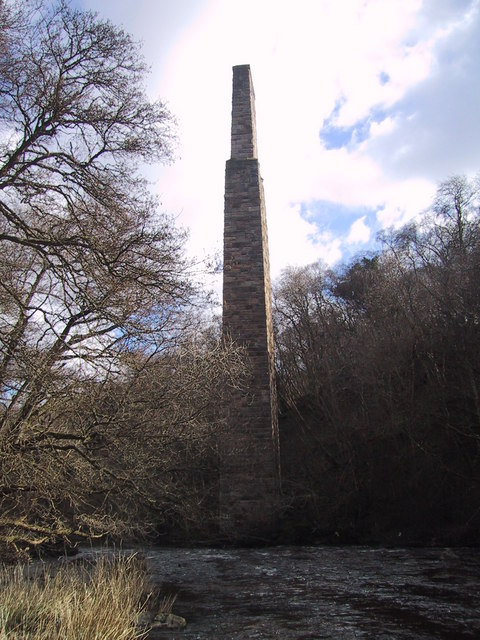
One of the extant stone piers of Nethan Viaduct in 2007

There were major difficulties building the line as, following rain, the ground took up the appearance and consistency of black mud. The line was built over a vast coalfield. In between the coal were large deposits of various other valuable minerals. There were several landslips as the embankments were being built. Two large viaducts had to be constructed – one at Nethan and another near Hamilton. The former had to be re-constructed a few years following the opening as the heavy coal trains were causing considerable damage. It had been built on a very low budget, and it was too low. Consequently, the approaches on both sides were very steep. In a costly rebuild iron piers were inserted between the existing stone ones and the rail level was raised by 19 1/2 feet (5.9 m) permitting an easing of the approach gradients. Even then the Nethan viaduct was a fragile structure and one of the highest in Scotland. A 20 mph (32 km/h) speed limit was imposed on it. It was demolished in 1955. Lesmahgow station was high above and well east of the town. In July 1905 a roughly parallel line was built with a station closer to the centre of the town and the earlier station was renamed Brocketsbrae. Trains ceased to call at the latter station in 1951.

== Running ==
From the start the line was extremely busy with mineral traffic. At one stage, eight engines were required to work the line and, owing to the weight of the coal being transported, they had to be the most powerful available. A large quantity of cannel coal was transported. This was a highly volatile mineral that was in demand by the gas industry. Apart from coal, several other minerals were found in the area, and transportation by rail was the preferred option. These included ironstone, limestone and sandstone. When passenger trains were introduced they were widely used by people travelling to and from work.
