= Clyde Valley Woodlands National Nature Reserve =

Nature reserve in South Lanarkshire, Scotland

- IUCN category II (national park)
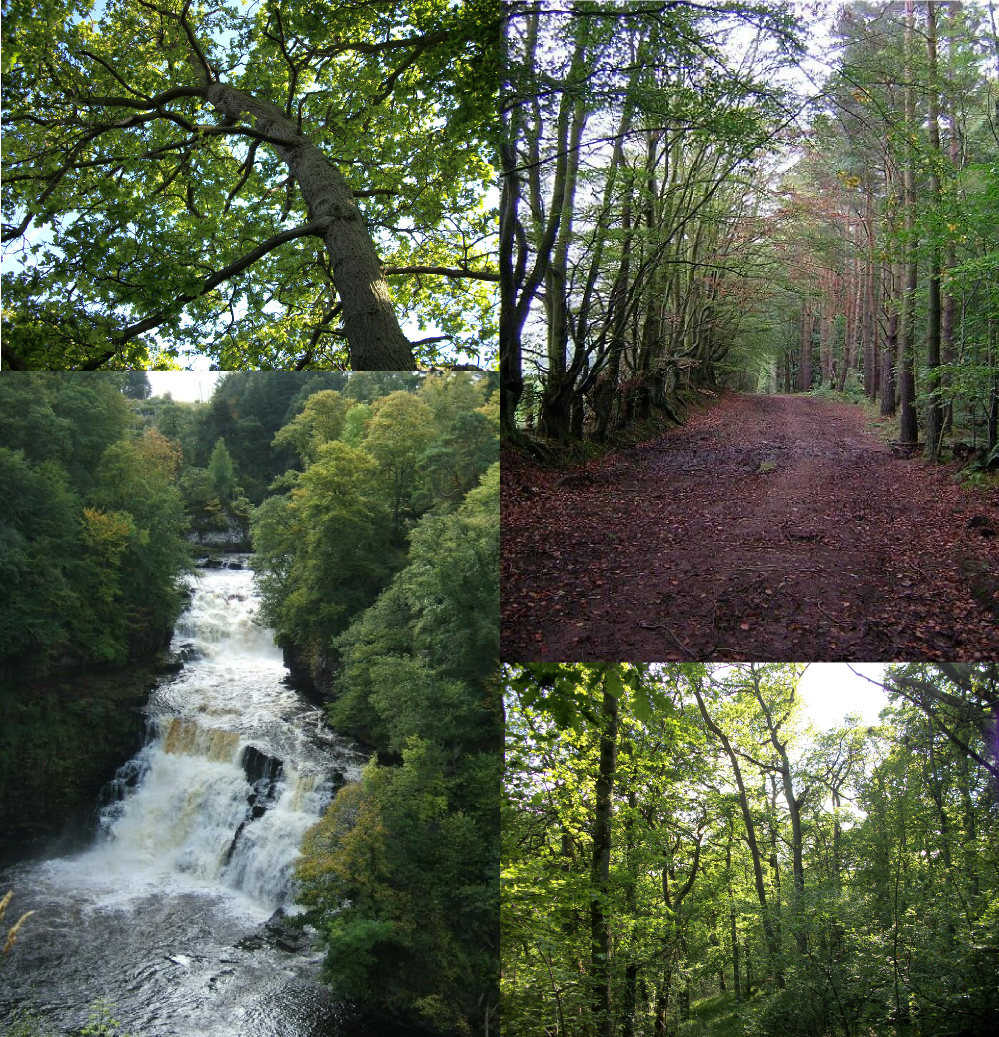
- Clockwise, from top left: 1) an oak tree at Cartland Craigs; 2) one of the walkways at Chatelherault; 3) dense woodland at Cleghorn Glen; 4) Corra Linn within the Falls of Clyde.
- Interactive map of Clyde Valley Woodlands National Nature Reserve
- Location: South Lanarkshire, Scotland, United Kingdom
- Nearest city: Carluke, Hamilton, Lanark and Lesmahagow
- Area: 318 ha (790 acres)
- Designation: NatureScot
- Established: 1981; extended in 1987 and 2007.
- Owner: NatureScot, Scottish Wildlife Trust and South Lanarkshire Council

The Clyde Valley Woodlands National Nature Reserve (NNR) comprises six separate woodland sites in the Clyde Valley region of South Lanarkshire, Scotland. These six sites are located along a 12 km section of the River Clyde and its tributaries, and lie close to built-up areas such as Hamilton and Lanark on the southern outskirts of Greater Glasgow. The sites can be easily accessed by about two million people living in the surrounding urban areas, making the reserve unique amongst Scotland's NNRs, most of which tend to be located in more remote areas. The six sites are:

- Cartland Craigs - managed by NatureScot
- Cleghorn Glen - managed by NatureScot
- Falls of Clyde- managed by the Scottish Wildlife Trust (SWT)
- Hamilton High Parks at Chatelherault - managed by South Lanarkshire Council (SLC)
- Mauldslie Woods - managed by SLC
- Nethan Gorge - managed by SWT

The woodlands are located in steep-sided river gorges and contain outstanding examples of the ancient, semi-natural, deciduous woodland which would once have covered much of the Central Belt. Plant species found on the floor of the woodlands include bluebells, wild garlic, wood anemone and wood sorrel. The woodlands are also home to an unusual array of invertebrates including various species of beetles, hoverflies and caddisflies. Larger creatures include European badgers and breeding peregrine falcons. At the Falls of Clyde in particular there are endangered peregrine falcons and rare tundra plant life that has survived on a cliff face since the last Ice Age.

The reserve was first established in 1981, when Cleghorn Glen was declared a National Nature Reserve. In 1987 Cartland Craigs was declared part of the reserve, which was renamed as the Clyde Valley Woodlands National Nature Reserve. In 2007 four additional sites (Chatelherault, the Falls of Clyde, Mauldslie Woods and Nethan Gorge) were declared parts of the Clyde Valley Woodlands National Nature Reserve.

== Other conservation designations ==
Five of the six sites are designated Sites of Special Scientific Interest (SSSIs), although the boundaries of each SSSI generally differ from those of the NNR. Mauldslie Woods near Carluke is not an SSSI, and has no other official designation. It was added to the NNR as an experimental addition, with the site being used to demonstrate methods of woodland management that promote biodiversity.

The reserve is classified as a Category II protected area by the International Union for Conservation of Nature. There is also a Special Area of Conservation (SAC) entitled Clyde Valley Woods, which covers 437 ha (1.7 sq mi) of land and partly overlaps with the NNR.

== Sites ==
Locations of the constituent sites of the Clyde Valley Woodlands National Nature Reserve within South Lanarkshire.

Six sites make up the Clyde Valley Woodlands National Nature Reserve.

=== Cartland Craigs and Cleghorn Glen ===
Cartland Craigs and Cleghorn Glen are two distinct sections of the Clyde Valley Woodlands NNR managed by NatureScot. Cleghorn Glen was designated as a National Nature Reserve in 1981 and Cartland Craigs was added in 1987. These two woodlands are located in deep gorges along a 4 km long section of Mouse Water. The main tree species on the lower slopes of the gorges are ash, elm, sycamore and hazel, with alder in the wetter areas. The higher parts of the woodlands have a more acidic soil, and are home to species such as oak, birch, hazel, Scots pine and occasional stands of aspen. The woodlands are considered representative of a type of habitat known as lime-sycamore forest; however Scotland is too far north for lime, and so their place is taken by elms. Many of the elm, hazel and oak trees at the northern edge of Cleghorn Glen were coppiced between the early 19th and mid-20th centuries to provide wood for a variety of purposes including charcoal, pit props and products such as clogs and bobbins for the cotton mills at New Lanark.

Over 210 species of flowering plants have been recorded at the two sites, including less-common species such alternate-leaved golden saxifrage, wood fescue, yellow star of Bethlehem, globe flower, Dutch rush and herb paris.

The woodlands are ideal for badgers, who build their setts on the slopes of the gorges and forage for food in the surrounding fields. Other mammals found include brown hares, pipistrelle bats, and Eurasian otter. Of the birds present, the most notable are the spotted flycatcher, Eurasian bullfinch and song thrush, all of which are identified as priority species in the United Kingdom Biodiversity Action Plan.

Jerviswood, on the edge of Cleghorn Glen, features in the Lanark Lanimers celebrations, as birks (birch twigs) from here are carried as part of the procession. This came about due to a dispute in 1840, in which townspeople were accused of damaging birch trees planted by the owner of the wood. Further investigations found that the land did not in fact belong to the purported owner, and so birks gathered from Jerviswood are carried to emphasise the town's right to march over this land.

=== Falls of Clyde ===
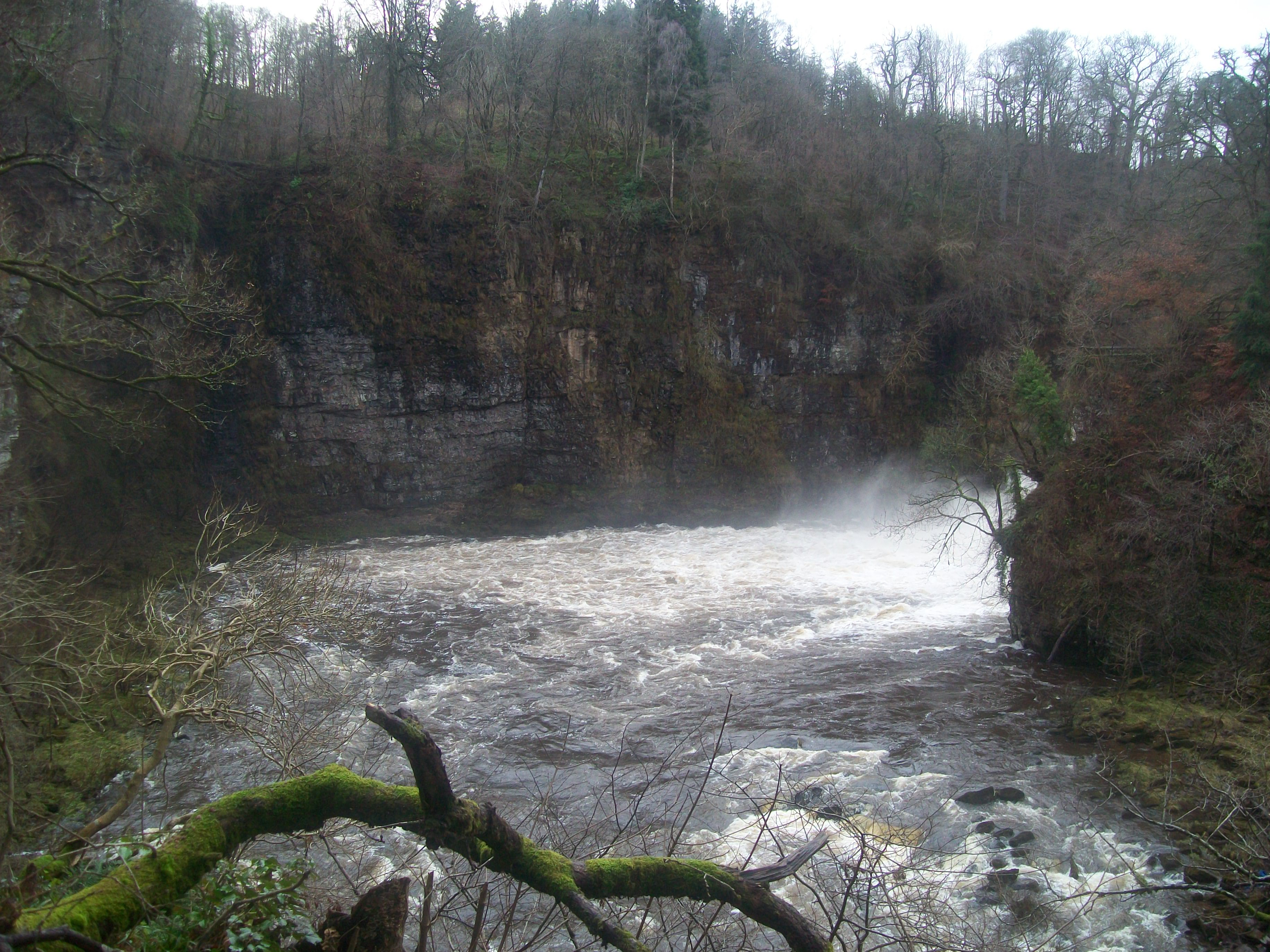
The natural amphitheatre at the base of Corra Linn (shown) is home to rare tundra plant-life.

The Falls of Clyde are a collection of four waterfalls along the river Clyde, near the villages of New Lanark and Stonebyres. Only the three falls near New Lanark (Bonnington Linn, Corra Linn and Dundaff Linn) are included in the Falls of Clyde site of special scientific interest; the other, Stonebyres Linn, is about 2 miles (3 km) further downstream.

Scottish Wildlife Trust, a charitable organisation, manages the Falls of Clyde site, focusing on the preservation of the endangered or protected wildlife in the grounds, such as peregrine falcons, roe deer and European badgers. Much interesting, protected and rare plant life can be found on the site, such as fields of heather, rowan, and bluebells; the slopes of the natural amphitheatre beneath Corra Linn are home to a rare tundra plant life which has survived since the last ice age. There is also a great variety of native woodland on the site. Much of Scotland's native woodland has been destroyed or replaced with exotic trees by human activity.

Within the Falls of Clyde site there is an abundance of architecture, including Bonnington Pavilion, an 18th-century house of mirrors, an iron footbridge, and the 15th-century Corra Castle, all of which are in ruins.

=== Hamilton High Parks ===
Hamilton High Parks forms part of the Chatelherault estate, which is managed by South Lanarkshire Council. Part of the site is classified as a SSSI, although the NNR extends further to include most of the land along the Avon Water and Meikle Glen within the estate. The main tree species at Hamilton High Parks are ash and elm, with areas of oak, birch and alder also present. The parkland oaks known as the Cadzow oaks are home to a number of rare types of beetle, including the hairy fungus beetle, which is not thought to be found anywhere else in Scotland.

=== Mauldslie Woods ===
Mauldslie Woods lies west of Carluke, and is the only part of the NNR to have no other official designation. It is north of the Clyde, and has shallower slopes than the other sites in the Reserve. As a result, by the 1800s the woodland here had been cleared and replanted, including one section which was planted as orchard for apples, pears and plums. Since 2007 Mauldslie Woods has formed part of the NNR, and is now being actively managed to restore the native woodland. The aim is to use the site to demonstrate methods of woodland management that promote biodiversity alongside sustainable timber extraction.

=== Nethan Gorge ===
The Nethan Gorge portion of the NNR consists of two sites on the River Nethan that are managed by the Scottish Wildlife Trust. A path links the two reserves, following a route past Craignethan Castle.

Upper Nethan Gorge, located near the village of Blackwood, contains an area of ancient woodland, in which ash and elm woodland grows on steep slopes above the River Nethan. The lower, wetter parts of the woodland host alderwoods, which are not common in South Lanarkshire. Plants such as broadleaved helleborine, wood melick and meadow saxifrage, all of which are locally uncommon, can be seen. Bird species present include great spotted woodpeckers and buzzards.

Lower Nethan Gorge, located near the village of Crossford, is a semi-natural woodland consisting chiefly of elm, ash and oak trees. The site is particularly noted for a number of uncommon beetles including the nationally scarce species Cerylon fagi, Tetratoma ancora and Ptinomorphus imperialis. Other notable animals found here include European green woodpeckers, Eurasian otters and badgers.
