= Cleghorn, South Lanarkshire =

Village in South Lanarkshire, Scotland

Coordinates: 55°41′19″N 3°44′12″W

Cleghorn
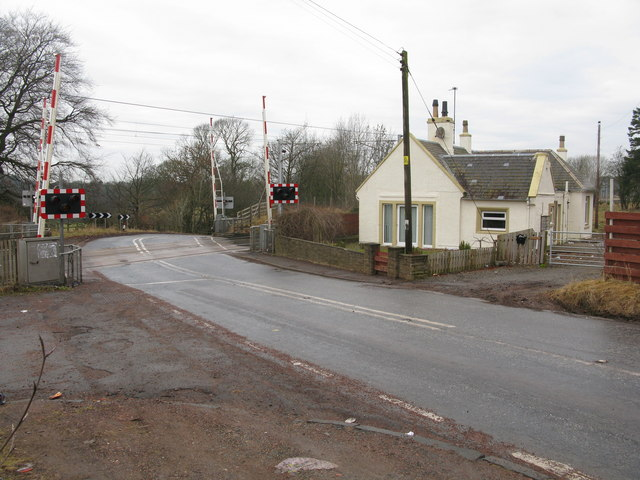
- Cleghorn Level Crossing

- Location within South Lanarkshire
- Civil parish: Lanark
- Council area: South Lanarkshire
- Lieutenancy area: Lanarkshire
- Country: Scotland
- Sovereign state: United Kingdom
- Post town: LANARK
- Postcode district: ML11
- Police: Scotland
- Fire: Scottish
- Ambulance: Scottish
- UK Parliament: Lanark and Hamilton East
- Scottish Parliament: Clydesdale

Cleghorn is a village in Lanark in South Lanarkshire, Scotland. Cleghorn Village is around 2 1/4 miles (3.6 km) north-east of Lanark town, and is a small close community with about 250–300 residents and under 50 houses. The village is in the catchment area of Lanark Grammar School.

The Mouse Water runs through Cleghorn, coming down from the hills of the village of Forth, through Carstairs Village.

People have been staying in the area of Cleghorn for over a thousand years, from wealthy landowners to the Romans, who built roads and forts around the area.

Near the village is the site of the 46.7-acre (18.9 ha) Cleghorn Roman camp which dates from the 2nd Century and is a scheduled monument. The camp is in a defensive position overlooking a Roman road as it crosses Mouse Water, the camp could accommodate two Roman legions – around 12,000 men.

The village of Cleghorn was established around the start of the 20th century, although there was an estate near where the village now sits. The house was known as Hagholm house, which the new main through road of the village has been named after.

The village was served by Cleghorn railway station 1848 to 1965 on the Caledonian main line, the station building remains standing today. There is still a level crossing at the nearby Cleghorn Junction.

Cleghorn Glen and Cleghorn Bridge are sites in the surrounding area that are named after the village. The walkways are made up of ancient woodlands and have great views as it winds its way from Cleghorn Bridge, to Cartland Bridge just outside Lanark. The woodlands are protected and designated a national nature reserve, they are managed as part of the Clyde Valley Woodlands. Other places of interest are Newmills Fishery and foundation structures from the Roman invasion period.
