= Mauldslie Woods =

Scottish woodland area near Carluke, South Lanarkshire

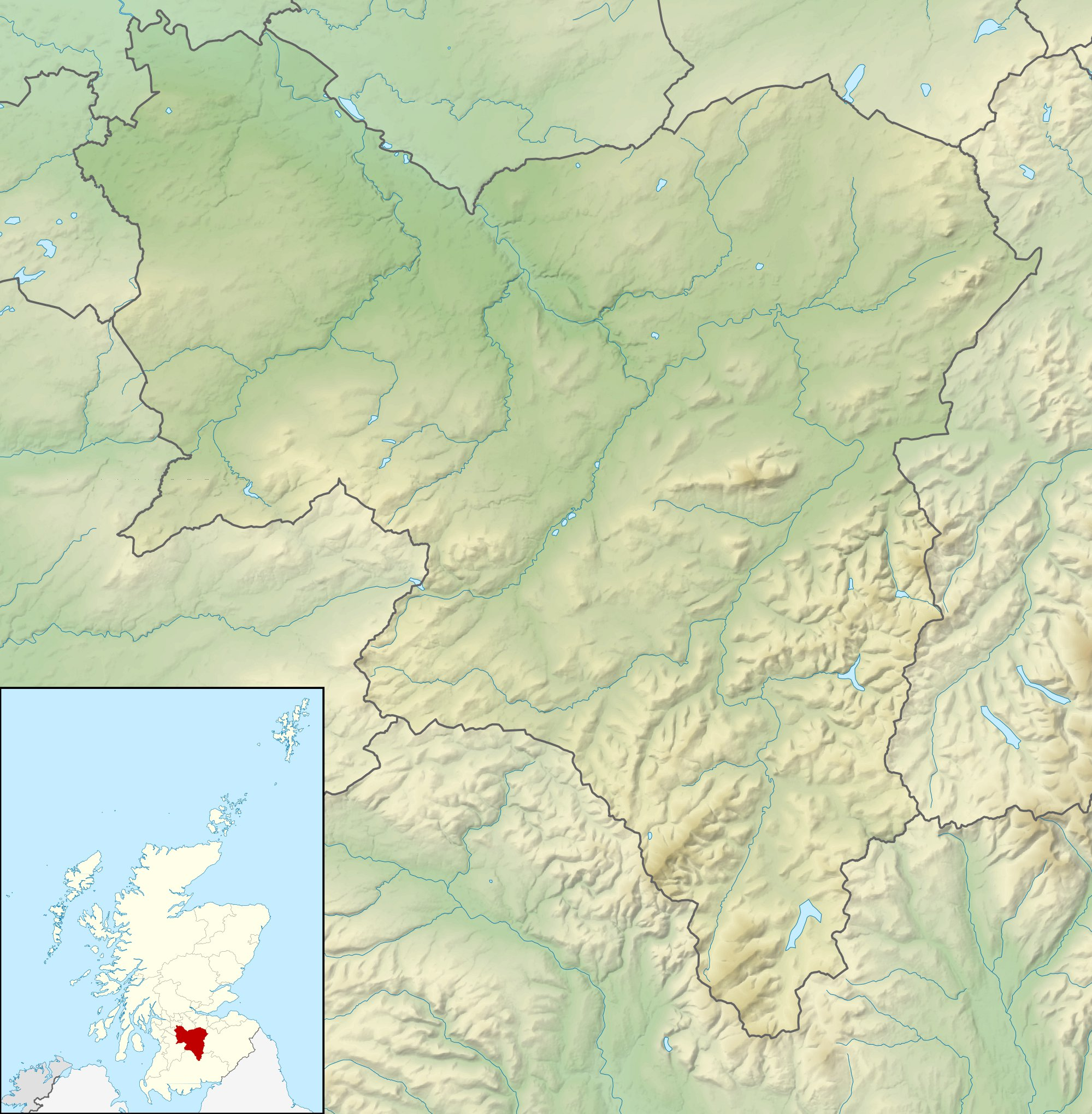
- Location within South Lanarkshire
- Location: South Lanarkshire, Scotland, United Kingdom
- Nearest city: Carluke
- Coordinates: 55°44′5.956″N 3°53′59.9094″W
- Established: 2007: Mauldslie Woods declared a constituent woodland of the Clyde Valley Woodlands National Nature Reserve.
- Governing body: South Lanarkshire Council
- Website: www.nnr-scotland.org.uk/clyde-valley-woodlands/

Mauldslie Woods is an area of woodland close to the town of Carluke, South Lanarkshire. It is one of six woodlands which form the Clyde Valley Woodlands National Nature Reserve, the others being Cartland Craigs, Chatelherault, Cleghorn Glen, Falls of Clyde and Lower Nethan Gorges. It stands on the estate of Mauldslie Castle, whose most notable resident was John Wightman of Mauldslie, Lord Provost of Edinburgh 1721/23.

The woodland was cleared in the 1800s, but has since been replanted, including one section planted as orchard for apples, pears and plums. The site is managed by South Lanarkshire Council, with aim of restoring the native woodland. The aim is to use the site to demonstrate methods of woodland management that promote biodiversity alongside sustainable timber extraction.
