= Cartland Craigs =

Woodland in South Lanarkshire, Scotland

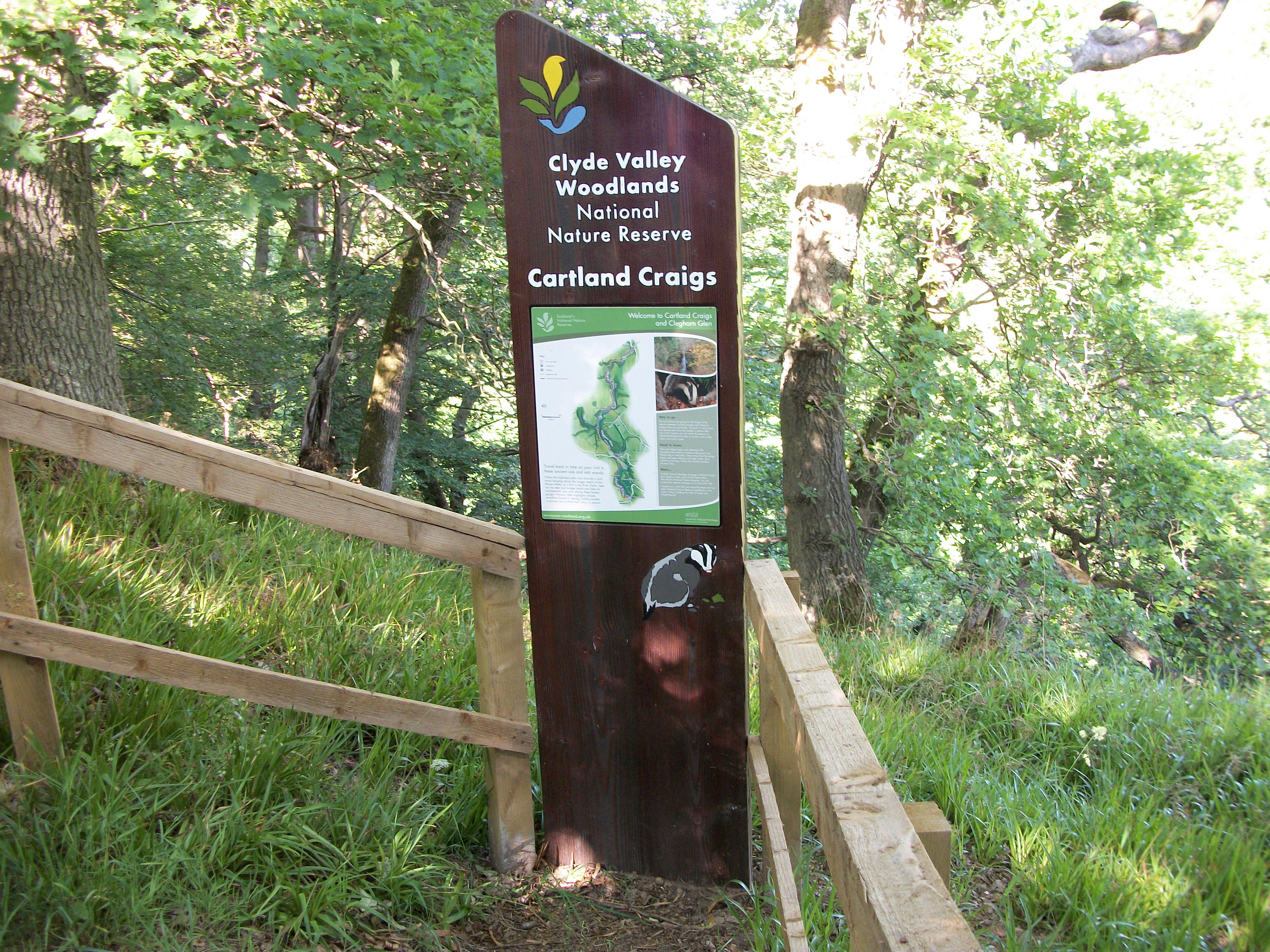
- Sign at the Cartland Bridge entrance to the reserve.

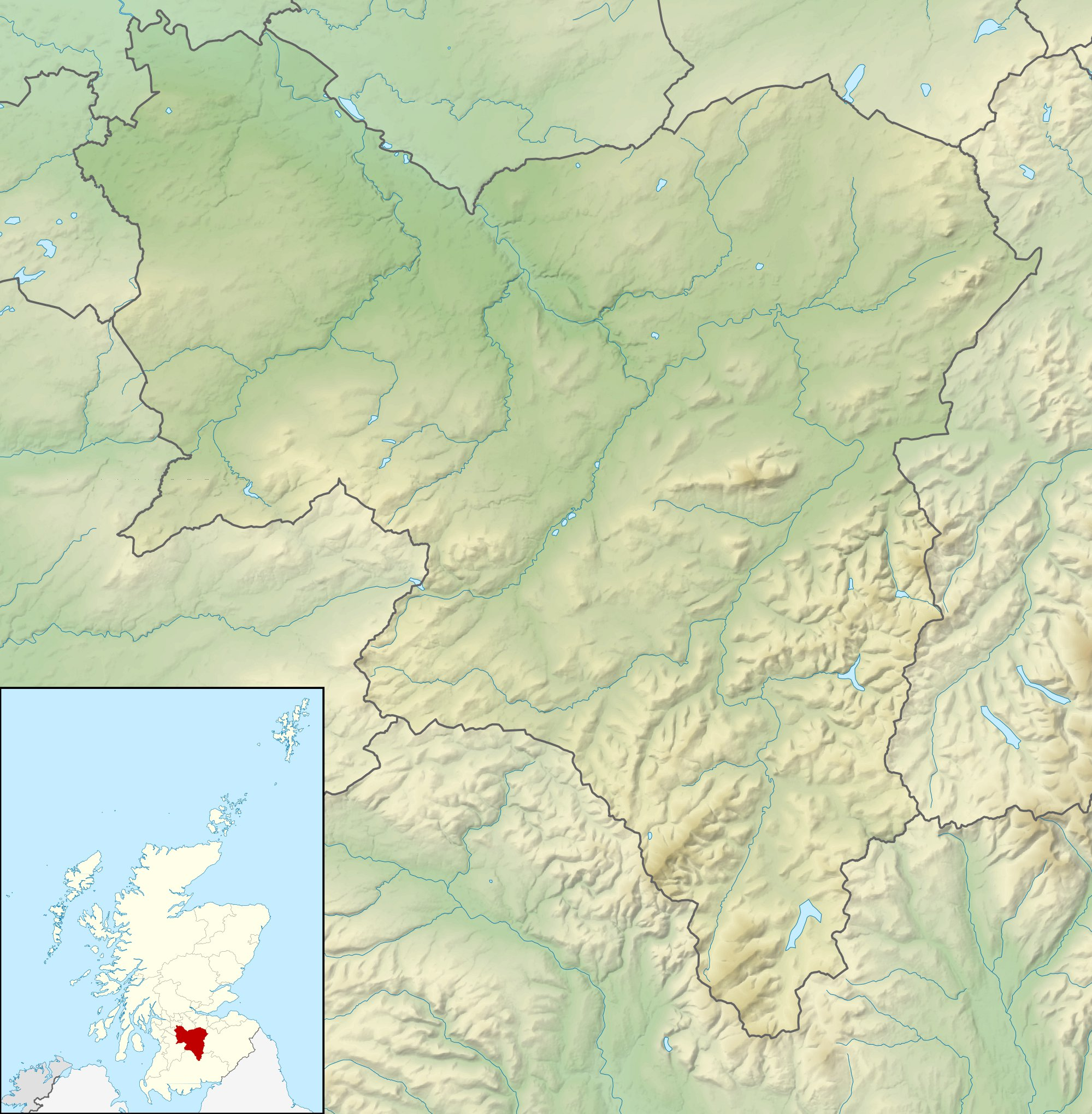
- Location within South Lanarkshire
- Location: South Lanarkshire, Scotland, United Kingdom
- Nearest city: Lanark
- Coordinates: 55°41′2.4″N 3°47′45.6″W
- Area: 10.29 hectares
- Established: 1953: Cartland Craigs is notified as a Site of Special Scientific Interest; 1987: Cartland Craigs is declared a part of the Clyde Valley Woodlands National Nature Reserve
- Governing body: Scottish Natural Heritage
- Website: www.nnr-scotland.org.uk/clyde-valley-woodlands/

Cartland Craigs (known locally as Cartland Crags) is a woodland on the outskirts of Lanark, South Lanarkshire, in Scotland. It is a national nature reserve and is one of six areas which together form the Clyde Valley Woodlands (the other five being Cleghorn Glen, Falls of Clyde, Chatelherault, Nethan Gorge and Mauldslie Woods). The reserve is maintained by Scottish Natural Heritage.

Cartland Craigs is adjacent to Cleghorn Glen and is the smaller of the two. The footpaths merge to form a 4.5 km walk. The Cartland Bridge is at the main Lanark entrance to the reserve and the Moose Bridge is between Cartland Craigs and Cleghorn Glen.

The remains of the Castle Qua fort lie on the reserve and can be seen from the footpath.
