= Mouse Water =

Coordinates: 55°40′34″N 3°48′19″W

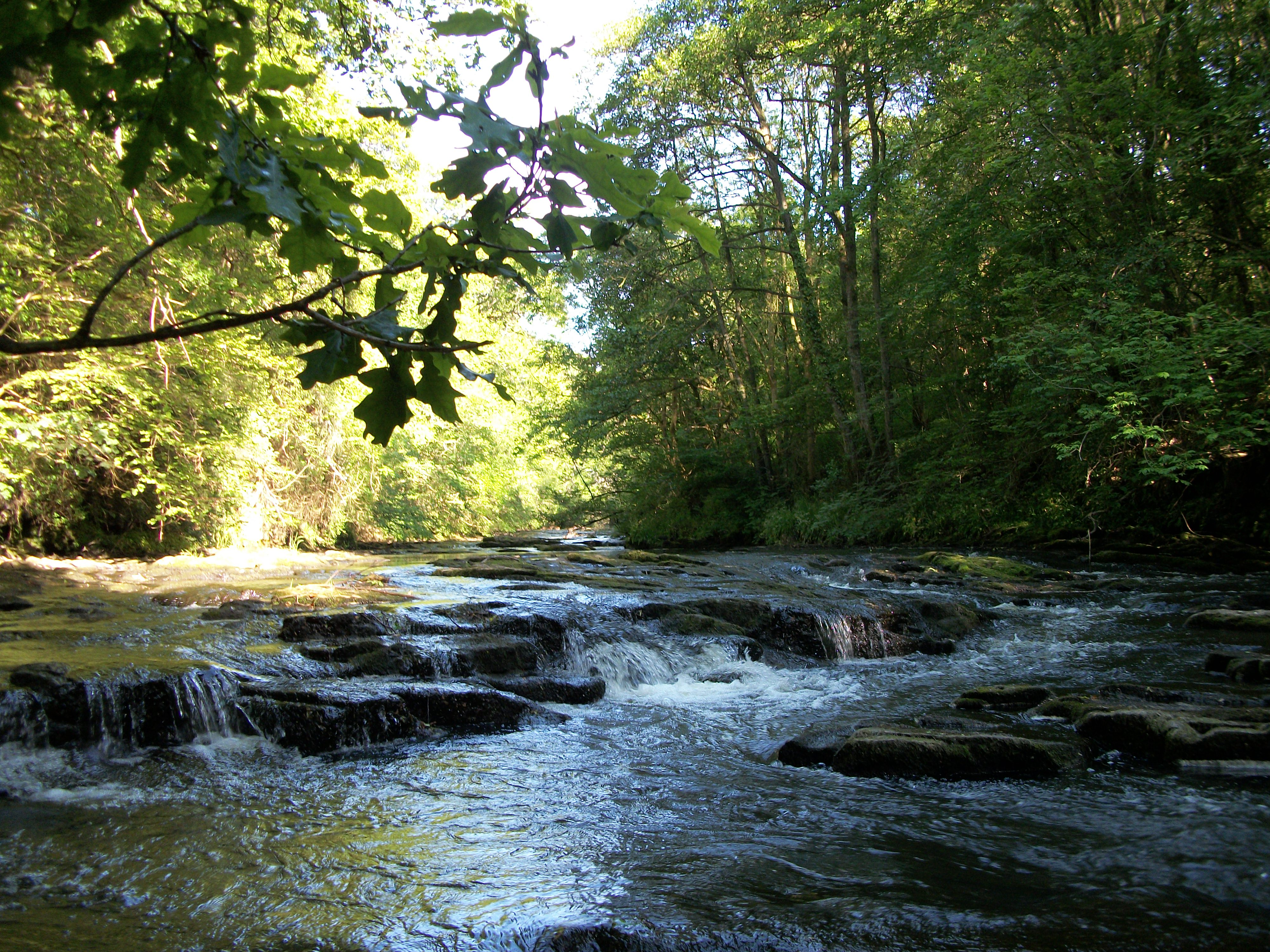
- Mouse Water as seen within Cleghorn Glen

Location
- Country: Scotland
- Region: South Lanarkshire

Physical characteristics
- Source
  - elevation: 335 m (1,099 ft)
- Length: 9.45 km (5.87 mi)

Basin features
- Progression: River Clyde
- Tributaries
  - left: Dippool Water

Mouse Water is a river in South Lanarkshire which is a tributary of the River Clyde. It is popular with canoeists. In the past, the fast flowing river was used to power mills and factories along its route and is still used today to produce hydroelectricity.

== Cleghorn Glen and Cartland Craigs ==
The river runs through Cleghorn Glen and Cartland Craigs, two sites of special scientific interest (SSSI) which form part of the Clyde Valley Woodlands National Nature Reserve. The deep gorge which characterises these SSSIs were formed roughly ten thousand years ago when the Mouse Water started to erode the rock at the site, which was mainly red sandstone.

== Crossings ==
Several bridges cross the Mouse Water. They are listed below in order from its origin to the point the river meets the Clyde.

- Cleghorn Bridge
- Cartland Bridge
- Mousemill Bridge
