= Cleghorn Glen =

Protected area in South Lanarkshire, Scotland

- formerly Cleghorn Glen National Nature Reserve
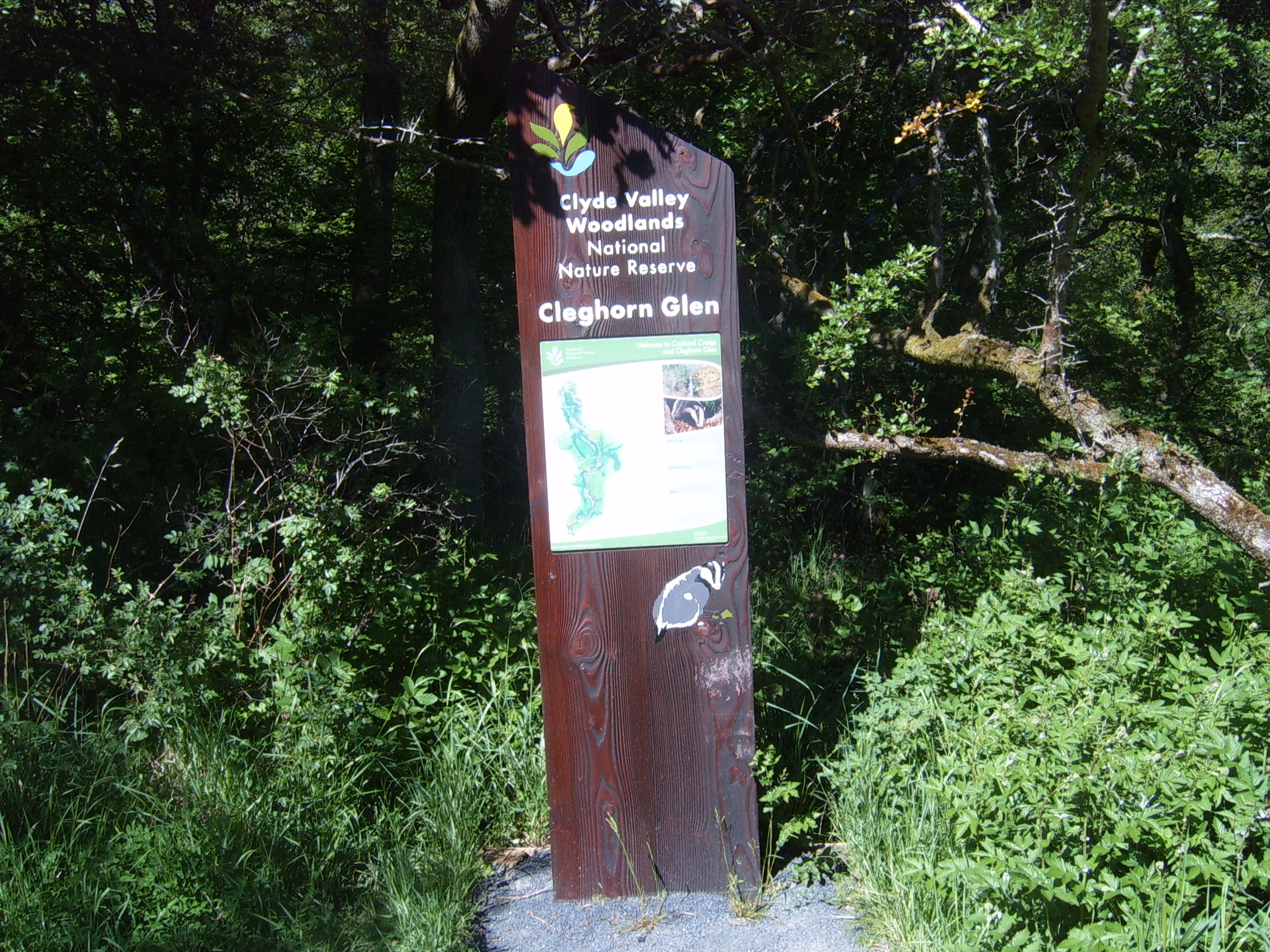
- Sign at the entrance to the Cleghorn Glen Site of Special Scientific Interest

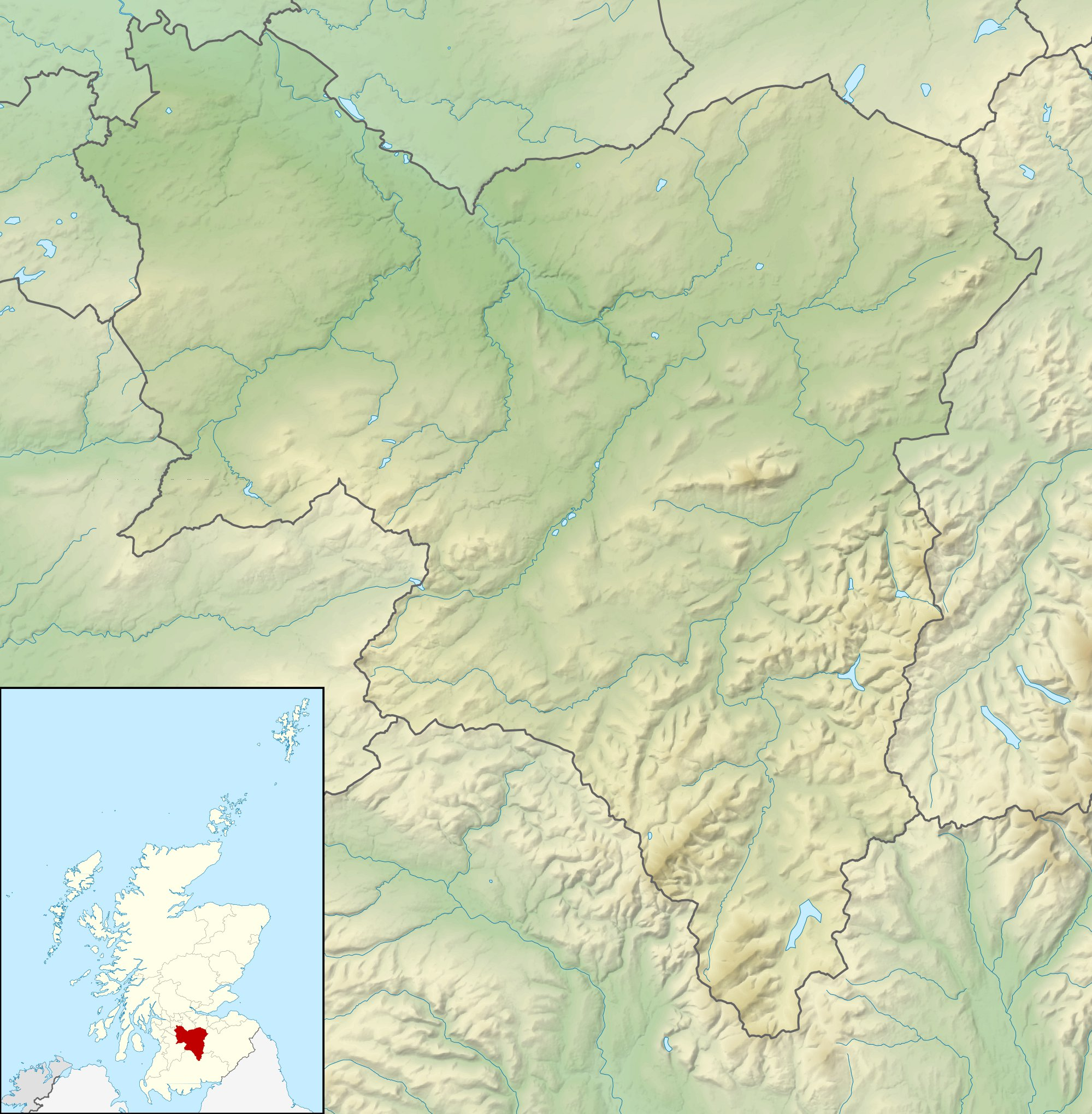
- Location within South Lanarkshire
- Location: South Lanarkshire, Scotland, United Kingdom
- Nearest city: Lanark
- Coordinates: 55°41′20.4″N 3°46′4.8″W
- Area: 41 hectares
- Established: 1953: Declared a site of special scientific interest 1981: Cleghorn Glen becomes a national nature reserve 1987: Cartland Craigs and Cleghorn Glen are declared constituent sites of the Clyde Valley Woodlands National Nature Reserve.
- Owner: 17 hectares: Scottish Natural Heritage; 24 hectares: Mr Elliot-Lockhart
- Website: www.nnr-scotland.org.uk/clyde-valley-woodlands/

Cleghorn Glen is a site of special scientific interest which lies outside Lanark and Cleghorn in South Lanarkshire, Scotland. It is one of the six ancient woodlands, along with Cartland Craigs, Falls of Clyde, Chatelherault, Nethan Gorge and Mauldslie Woods, which make up the Clyde Valley Woodlands National Nature Reserve.

== Gallery ==
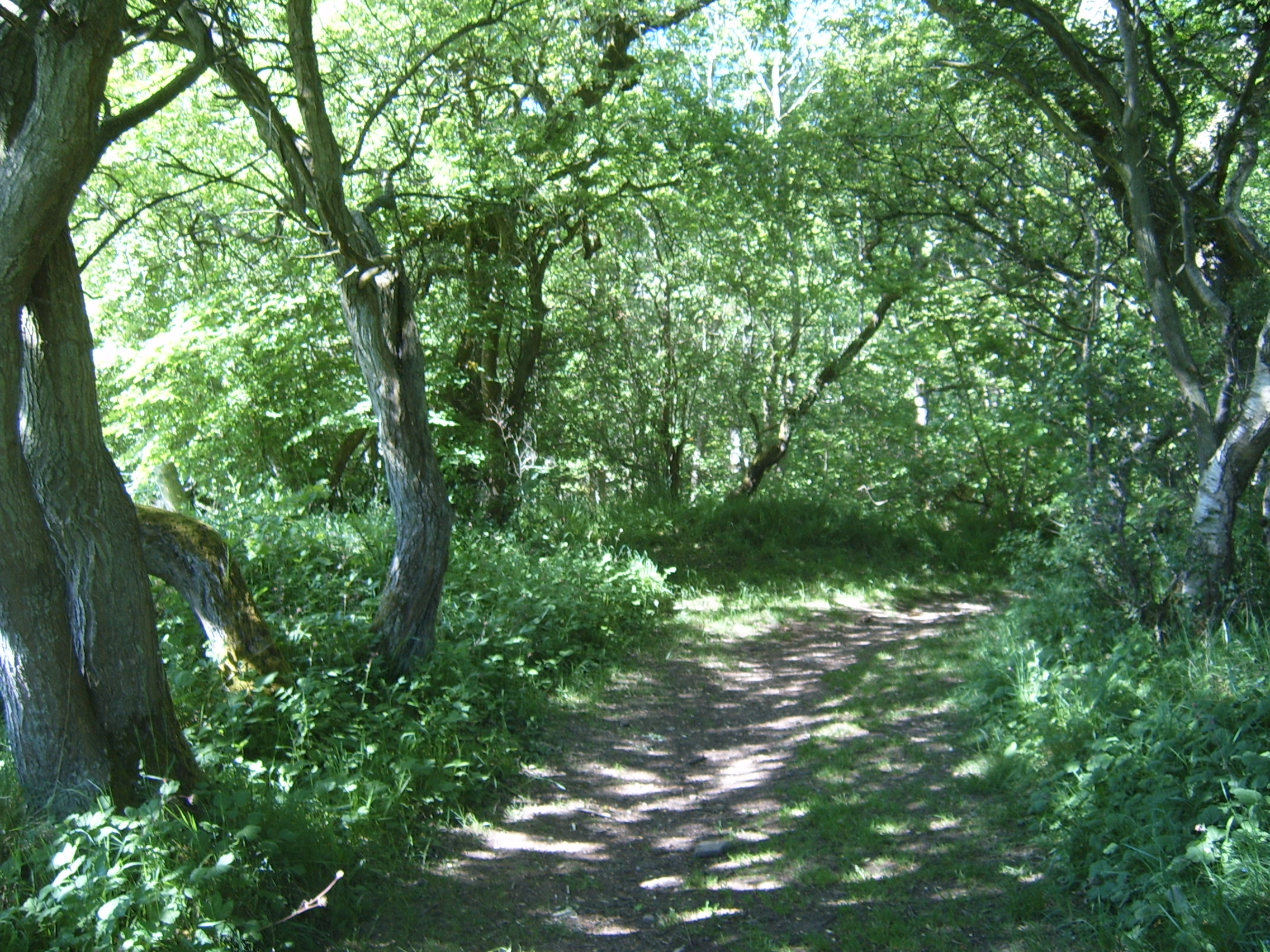
Start of the footpath

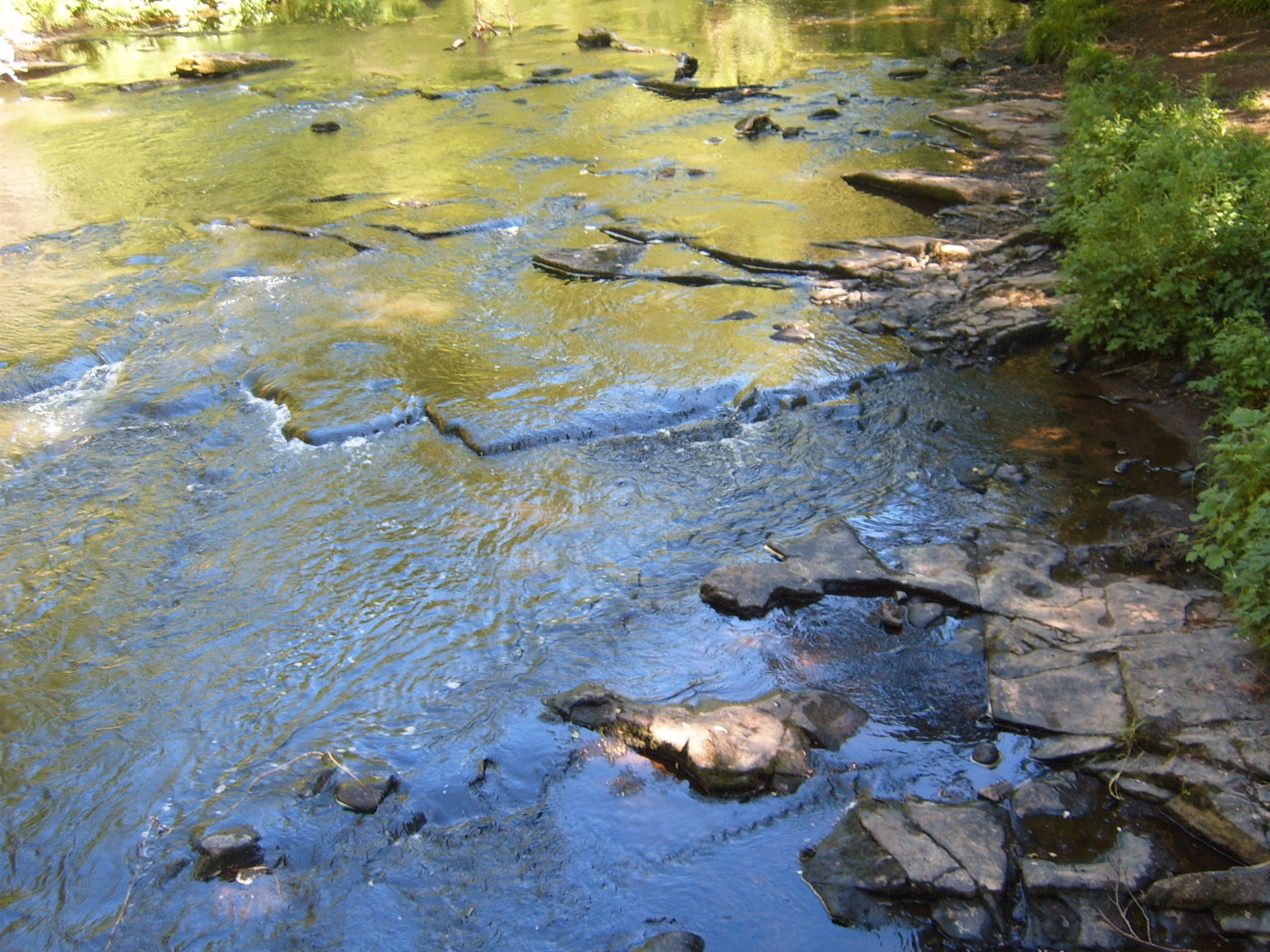
River moose, as seen at the start of the walk

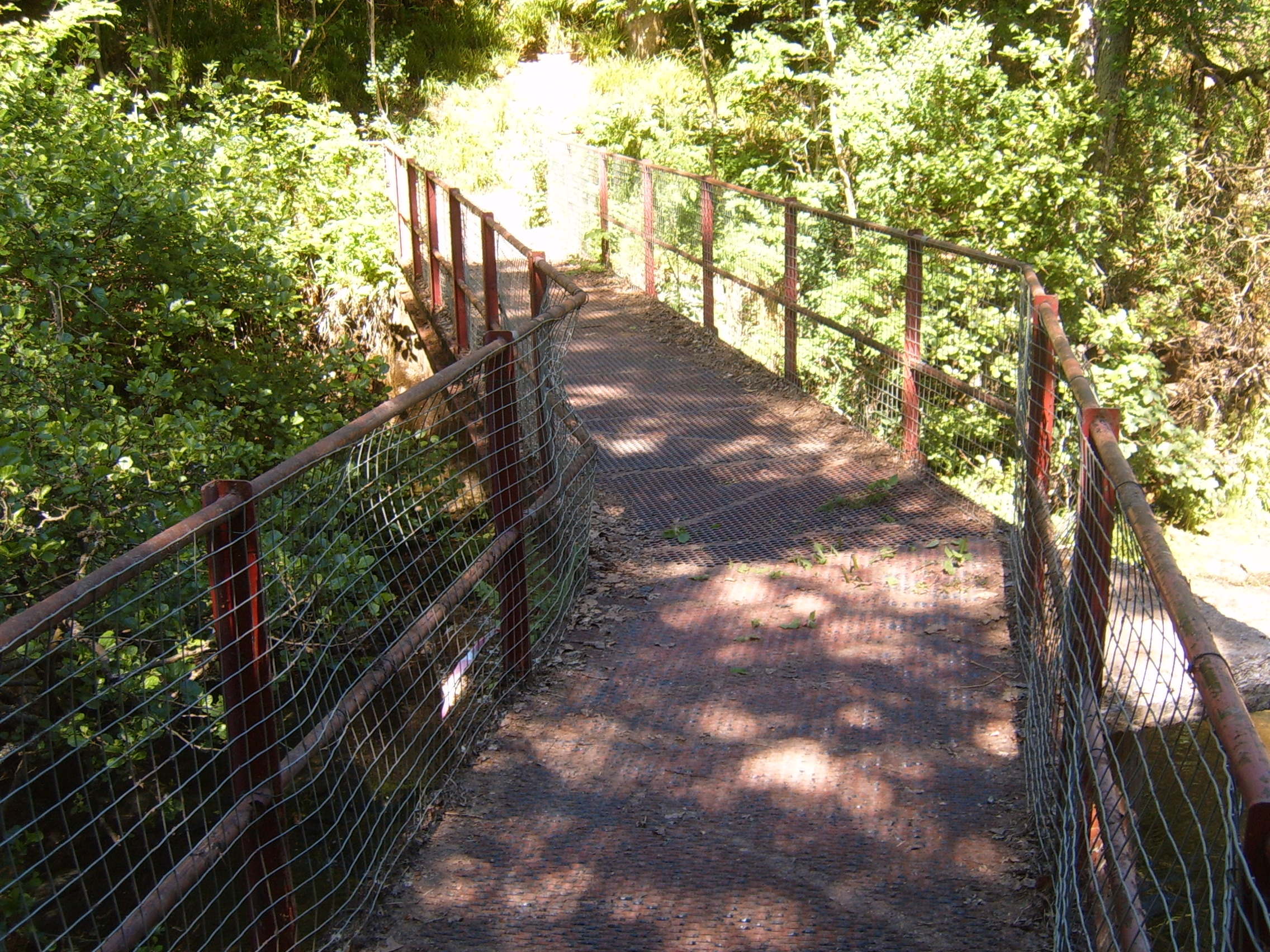
Leitchford Bridge

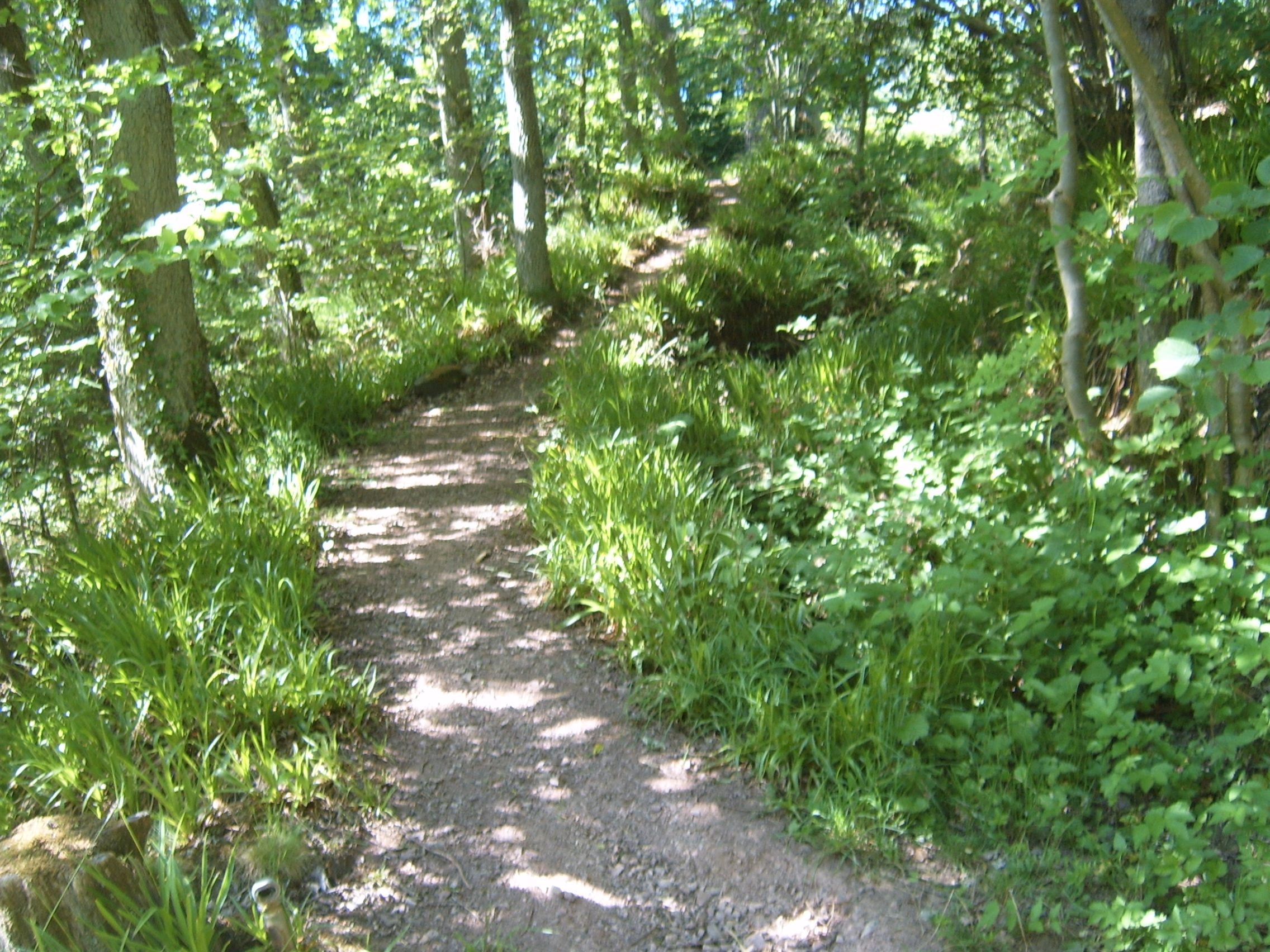
The start of the second walkway

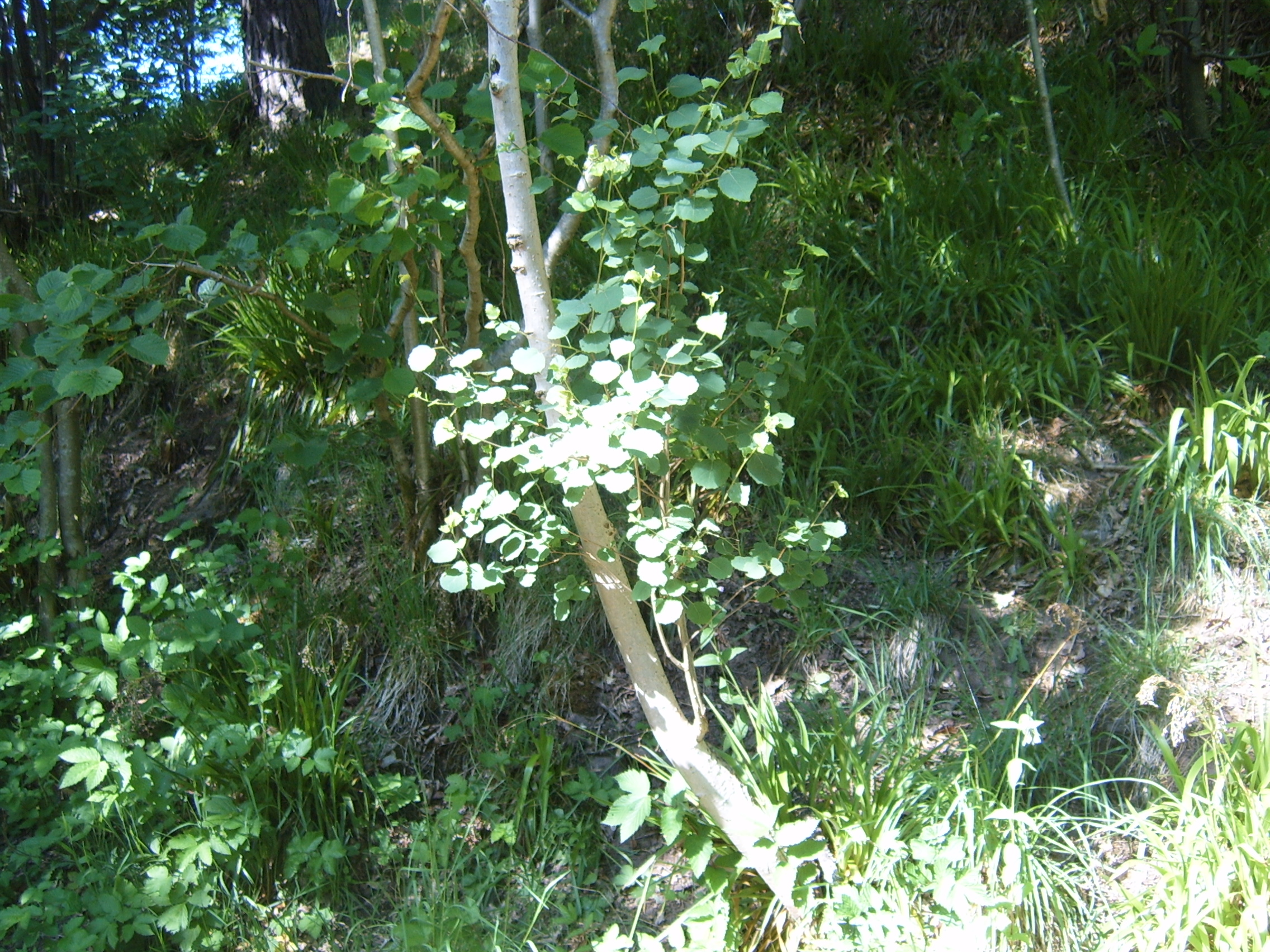
A birch tree, one of the many species of tree on the reserve

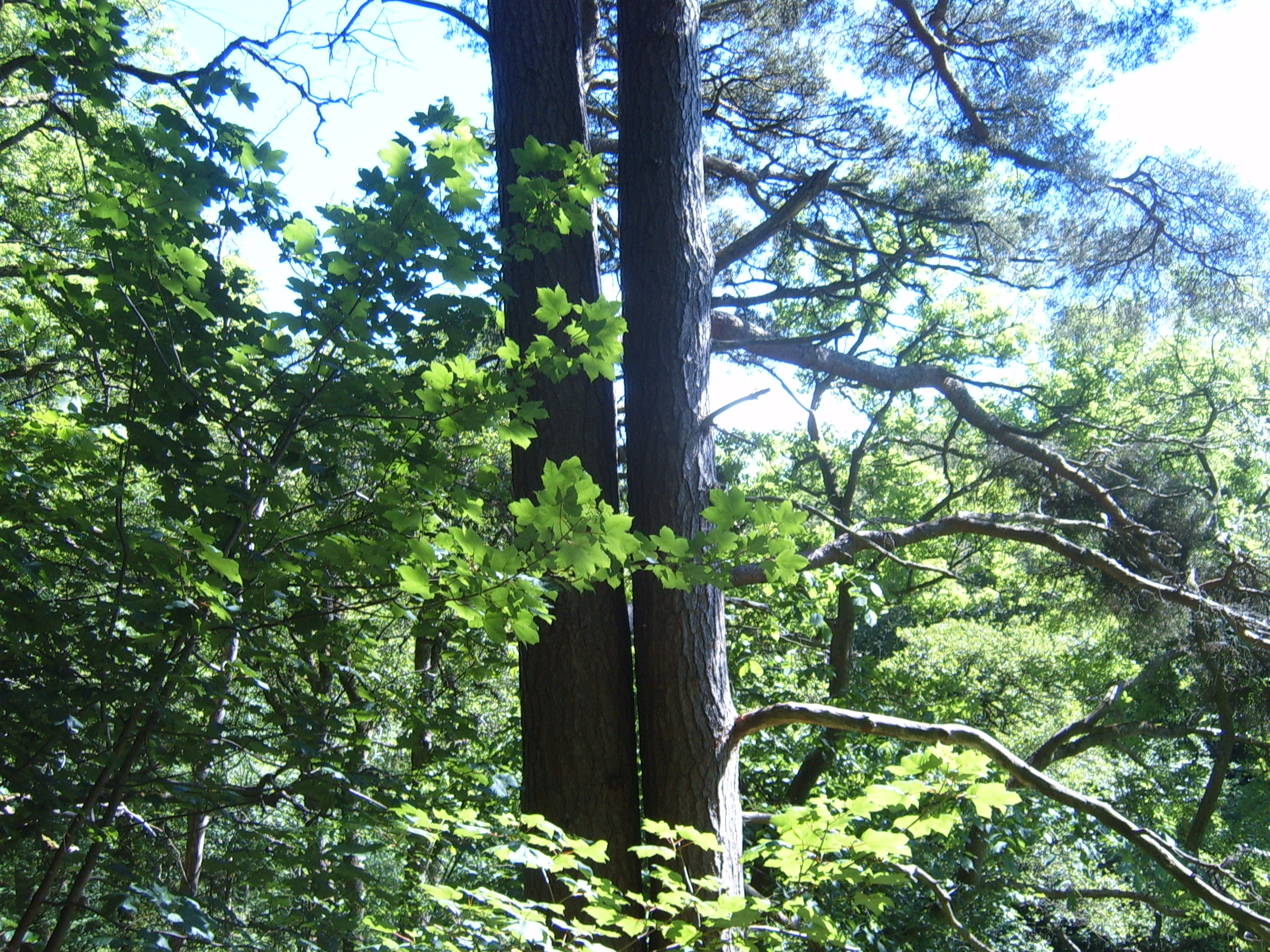
An example of the diverse woodland in Cleghorn Glen
