= Barncluith =

Coordinates: 55.7674°N 4.0258°W

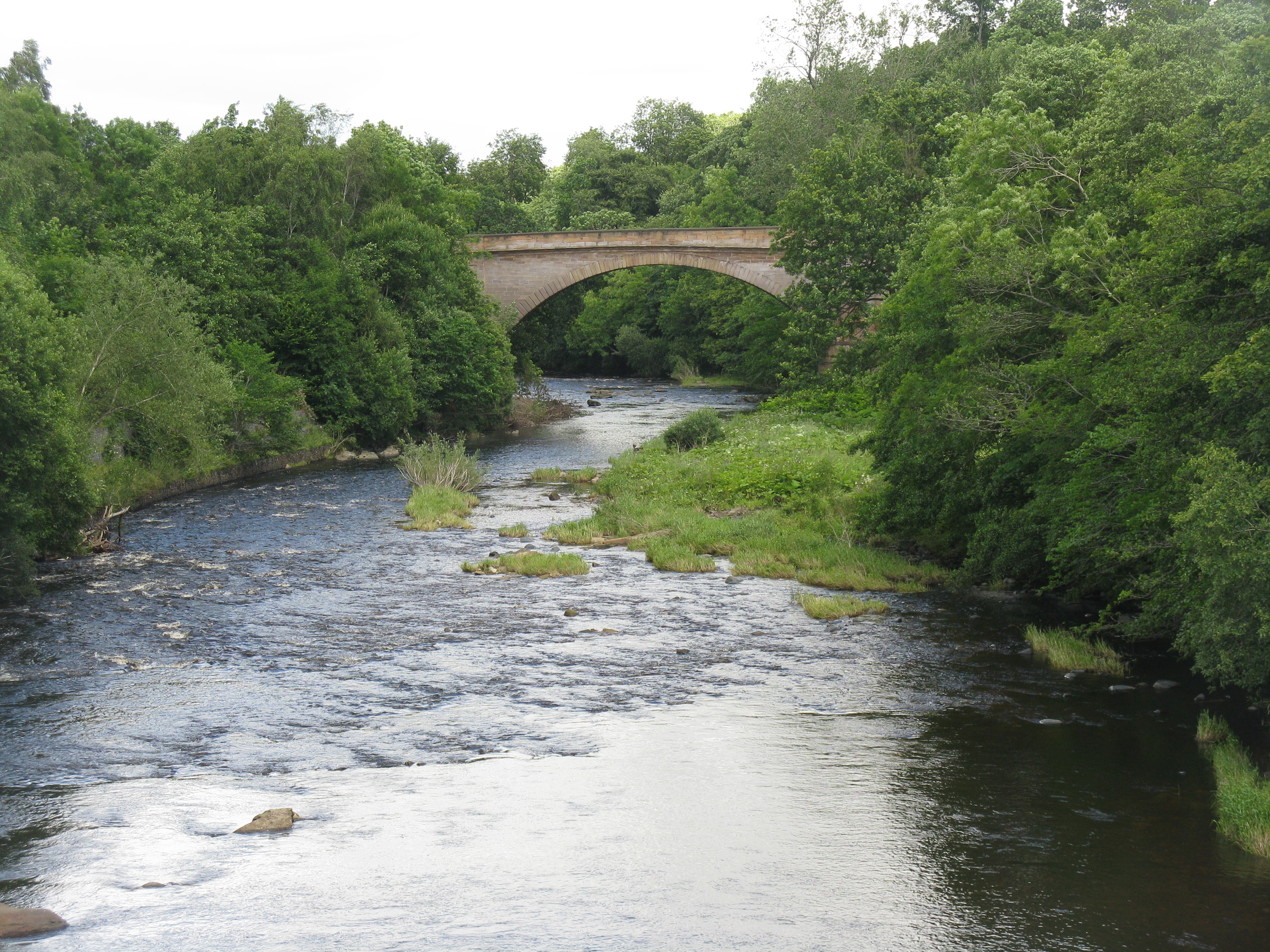
View from one bridge crossing the Avon Water from Ferniegair to Barncluith, looking towards the other bridge

Barncluith is an area of Hamilton in South Lanarkshire, Scotland. Barncluith forms the south-eastern part of the town, between the urban centre and the Avon Water. It lies either side of Carlisle Road (A72), which leads out of Hamilton to Chatelherault Country Park, Larkhall and the Clyde Valley. The name derives from "Baron's Cleugh", a cleugh being a ravine.

Barncluith Primary School closed in the 1990s. The school building stands at the corner of Miller Street and Townhead Street, and is now the Barncluith Business Centre. The parish church is St. John's Centre on Duke Street.

== Barncluith House and gardens ==
Barncluith
- Location in South Lanarkshire

Listed Building – Category A
- Official name: Terraces and Summerhouse, Barncluith
- Designated: 12 January 1971
- Reference no.: LB12522

Inventory of Gardens and Designed Landscapes in Scotland
- Official name: Barncluith
- Designated: 1 July 1987
- Reference no.: GDL00048

To the south of the area, alongside the Avon Water, are Barncluith tower house and Barncluith House. The tower house dates to the 16th century, while the house is of 18th-century origin. The terraced gardens which run down to the river, which date from the 17th century, are a category A listed building, and are included on the Inventory of Gardens and Designed Landscapes in Scotland, the national listing of significant gardens. The house and tower are both category B listed, having been extensively restored in the 20th century.

=== History ===
The lands of Barncluith were held by the Machan family, of Norman origin. In 1507 Anne Machan married William Hamilton of Rossmoor, kinsman of the Duke of Hamilton. Their son fought and died at the Battle of Langside (1568), and Barncluith was subsequently inherited by their grandson John Hamilton. The tower house of Barncluith dates to around this time, and was probably built by John Hamilton along with the gardens. The building of the terraces along the river is thought to date to the 17th century. The garden was laid out as seven "hanging terraces" leading down to the River Avon.

Another John Hamilton of Barncluith was Sheriff of the Lower Ward of Lanarkshire from shortly after 1707. He is said to have held his court within the pavilion in the terrace garden, and to have carried out executions at a nearby oak tree. In the 1730s, the involvement of the architect William Adam in works at Barncluith is suggested by surviving correspondence with his clerk of works.

Ownership of Barncluith passed from the Hamiltons to the Ruthven family in the 19th century. At this time the gardens at Barncluith were renowned as an example of an old Scots garden, and were popular with visitors to the area.

In the 19th century the mound on which the castle had originally stood was levelled and enclosed by a stone balustrade by David Bryce. By 1900 the main garden had been reduced from seven to five terraces but including summerhouses and gardenhouses, a fountain and "the Duke of Hamilton's bath" and was described by Sir Robert Lorimer as "the most romantic little garden in Scotland".

The estate was bought in 1908 by lawyer James C. Bishop, who restored the gardens. In 1927 Hamilton Palace was demolished, and Bishop secured a number of fragments of carved masonry which he brought to Barncluith and re-used as garden ornaments. These include a large carving of the Hamilton coat of arms.
