= Craignethan Castle =

16th-century Scottish castle

- Crossford, South Lanarkshire in Scotland
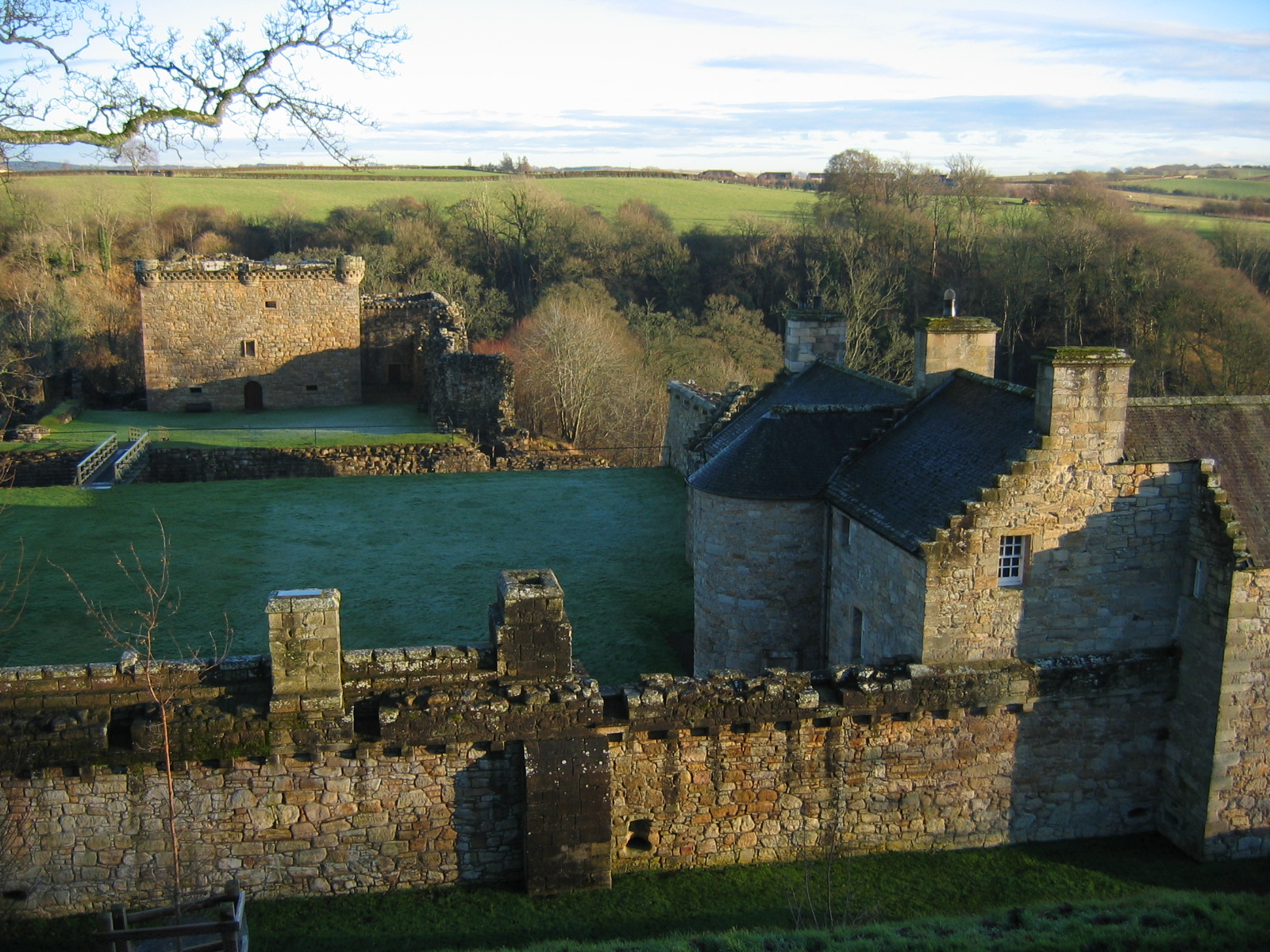
- View of the castle from the west

Site information
- Owner: Historic Environment Scotland

Location
- Location within South Lanarkshire
- Coordinates: 55°41′48″N 3°53′07″W

Site history
- Built: 16th century
- Built by: James Hamilton of Finnart
- Materials: Stone

Craignethan Castle is a ruined castle in South Lanarkshire, Scotland. It is located above the River Nethan, a tributary of the River Clyde, at NS816464. The castle is two miles west of the village of Crossford, and 4.5 miles north-west of Lanark. Built in the first half of the 16th century, Craignethan is recognised as an excellent early example of a sophisticated artillery fortification, although its defences were never fully tested.

== History ==
The barony of Draffane, in which Craignethan was located, was a property of the Black Douglases until their forfeiture in 1455. The land was granted to the Hamilton family, and in 1530 was given by James Hamilton, 1st Earl of Arran to his illegitimate son James Hamilton of Finnart.

James Hamilton of Finnart had travelled in Europe, and had become an accomplished architect and military engineer. Appointed Kings Master of Works, he was responsible for the defences at Blackness Castle, as well as the renaissance facades of Linlithgow Palace. At Craignethan, he set out to build a "showcase" to display his talents in both domestic and military architecture.

Despite his earlier Royal favour, Hamilton was executed for treason in 1540, and his properties were forfeit to the crown. James V installed a garrison at Craignethan led by James and David Orrok. Silverwork from the chapel was taken to Edinburgh and engraved by John Mosman with the arms of the king's infant eldest son, James, Duke of Rothesay. James V sent his clock maker William Purves to Craignethan to dismantle Finnart's clock and take it to Edinburgh.

The Hamilton family, in the person of the James Hamilton, 2nd Earl of Arran, regained Craignethan Castle two years later. He added a large outer courtyard to the west of the castle. Arran served as regent in Mary's infancy, and became Duke of Châtellerault. Regent Arran's household books record the dates of his visits to Craignethan (including visits in March 1543 and on 17 January 1548), and the provision of food.

In 1565, Arran opposed Mary's second marriage to Lord Darnley, and was forced to surrender his castles at Craignethan and Cadzow. He went into exile at Newcastle in England, and surrendered Hamilton by the end of November 1565, when he promised to put Craignethan in the queen's hands. Several members of the family and their retainers (including Thomas Broun of Draffen) were forgiven on 2 January 1566 for holding the castles of "Hammiltoun and Draffen", despite the royal order.

The situation was reversed once more following Mary's abdication, when Arran aided her escape from Lochleven Castle, and regained his castles. Mary came to Craignethan for safety. Arran's son, Lord Claud Hamilton, is said to have entertained Mary at Craignethan on the night before the Battle of Langside in 1568. The battle, at which the Hamiltons fought the forces of Regent Moray, ended in defeat, and Mary was forced to flee to England. Craignethan and Cadzow were surrendered again. Moray came in person to the castle to receive the keys on 15 May 1568. Lord Claud attempted to recover the castle by force in October, and his brother Lord John began to starve out Moray's soldiers in November. The Hamiltons regained the castle by March.

Feuding continued between the Hamiltons and the opponents of Mary. In 1570, Moray was shot in Linlithgow by James Hamilton of Bothwellhaugh. After an English army assisting in the Marian civil war went to Glasgow in May 1570 the Hamiltons withdrew to Craignethan, and the Earl of Sussex was informed of Craignethan's defensive shortcomings;

"Draffin, a strong house of the Duke's, but situate in a hole, so that it is commanded on every part, and has no ordnance."

In the same month Lord Sempill now a King's man was captured and imprisoned in the castle. In August, the English ambassador in Scotland, Thomas Randolph heard that Regent Lennox was hoping to get the Hamiltons out of their "den of Draffen". Lennox planned to go to Clydesdale with the Earls of Mar and Glencairn, and Lord Ochiltree, bringing artillery from Stirling Castle. This expedition was postponed. There were allegations that the Craignethan garrison had destroyed crops and produce on lands of Lemphlair and Braidwood belonging to the Lairds of Cunninghamhead and Glenbervie, and captured Lord Sempill.

=== Surrender and slighting in 1579 ===
A treaty was signed between the King and Queen's parties in 1573, but by 1579 the Hamiltons were outlawed, and Lord Claud fled to France. The pretext was the killings of Regent Moray and Regent Lennox, and the Hamilton family prepared Hamilton, "Draffan", and Paisley for defence. Levies of troops were raised to capture Craignethan and Cadzow. By 15 May, the royal artillery was approaching, and the garrisons of Hamilton and Craignethan offered to surrender on terms. The king's forces refused. The "House of Hamilton" surrendered on 19 May. The garrison of Craignethan abandoned the castle in the night.

According to David Moysie, Craignethan surrendered to government forces on 18 May 1579, and Cadzow on the next day. Claud's older brother the 3rd Earl of Arran, who had been confined at Craignethan since 1575, their younger brother David, and mother were captured and taken to Linlithgow. Six soldiers of the Hamilton family who had defended the Hamilton strongholds were taken to stand trial for Moray's murder at Stirling.

By royal authority, Craignethan was slighted by "young Sir James Hamilton of Libberton". This involved the demolition of the north-west tower and the massive west wall, the 'inner barmkin', which was tumbled into the ditch, rendering the castle relatively defenceless. On 1 July 1592 Lord John Hamilton captured Archibald Wauchope of Niddrie with other rebel followers of the Earl of Bothwell at the meadow of Lesmahagow and imprisoned them in the castle. James VI sent Sir John Carmichael, captain of the royal guard, to collect the prisoners, but one of Hamilton's sons released them.

=== Later years ===
Craignethan was regained by the Hamiltons, but was sold by Duchess Anne in 1659. The new owner, Andrew Hay, a covenanting laird, built himself a two-storey house in the south-west corner of the outer courtyard. In 1730 Craignethan was sold to Archibald Douglas, Duke of Douglas. The property passed to his supposed collateral descendants, the Earls of Home, and the ruins were stabilised by the 12th earl in the late 19th century. The property was given into state care by the 14th Earl in 1949, and is now a Scheduled Ancient Monument managed by Historic Environment Scotland.

== Architecture ==
Craignethan is built on an imposing site above a bend in the River Nethan. Steep slopes protect the castle on the south, north and east sides, but the castle is actually overlooked by higher ground to the west, making it far more vulnerable than it appears. Craignethan's defences are therefore concentrated towards the west. The castle comprises a low central keep, within a rectangular walled courtyard. To the west is a deep ditch and beyond, a larger outer courtyard. Iain MacIvor writes that "Craignethan was the last private castle of high defensive capability built de novo in Scotland", comparing it to the contemporary remodelings undertaken at Blackness Castle and Tantallon Castle.

=== Keep ===
The rectangular keep measures 21m by 16m, and was originally of two storeys plus an attic. Attic and roof are now gone, but the walls are complete up to decorative corbels which supported a parapet walk. Round bartizans top each corner, and machicolations guard the door. Inside, the keep differs from the usual tower house layout in several ways. The entrance leads into a large stair lobby on the main hall floor, which was more commonly located on the first floor. Below this level are subterranean vaulted cellars containing four rooms, a prison, and a well. Access was from the main entrance lobby or direct from the kitchen.

The keep is divided internally by a wall running west to east. South of this wall on the ground floor is the hall, measuring 6m by 12m. The hall was accessed from the entrance lobby to the west, and was lit by three large windows. A fireplace stood in the internal wall, and a minstrel's gallery overlooks from the west wall. The hall ceiling was a stone vault, and the room fills the whole height of the keep. North of the internal wall was the kitchen, and a private room. Above these, within the height of the keep, were two additional rooms accessed from below. Another four rooms were located in the attic. The roof was a double gable, the central valley supported by the internal wall.

=== Inner courtyard ===
The inner courtyard measures 49 by 25 metres (161 by 82 ft), with walls strengthened by rectangular towers at each corner. The entrance was via a dog-leg passage through a gate tower midway along the north wall. The west wall was designed to stand up to artillery bombardment, and was up to 5m thick. It was destroyed in the late 16th century, and only the foundations remain. It is thought that the west wall was as high as the relatively low keep, and that this arrangement would have protected the keep from bombardment from the higher ground to the west.

Of the towers, the south-east was the largest, and is the only one still standing. Known as the "Kitchen Tower", it may in fact have housed the chapel. It is of three storeys, the lowest a subterranean vaulted chamber. Gunloops in the upper parts overlook the eastern approaches to the castle. Each of the four towers had space for storage and service areas, as well as additional accommodation for guests.

The defences of the original castle were completed by a ditch, 3.5m deep and 9m wide, at the base of the west wall. This ditch, originally crossed via a drawbridge, was filled in when the castle was slighted, and not re-excavated until the 1960s. In the base of the ditch a caponier was uncovered, a highly unusual feature in a Scottish castle. The caponier was accessed from the south-west tower, and comprised an enclosed tunnel with gunports overlooking the ditch, allowing the defenders to fire on any attackers attempting to cross or bridge the ditch. The only other known surviving caponiers in Scotland are at Blackness Castle, also designed by James Hamilton of Finnart, and a later example by Theodore Dury at Stirling Castle.

=== Outer court ===
The outer court was less heavily defended than the inner, and was added in the 1540s by the 2nd Earl of Arran. The court would have had service buildings around the perimeter, and possible gardens at the centre. There are towers at the two western corners, the north-west including a dovecot. The south-west tower was incorporated into Andrew Hay's House, the two storey dwelling built here by Andrew Hay in 1665. Gunloops are located along the west wall, which contains the main gate halfway along.

Craignethan Castle in 2018

== Walter Scott ==
In the Autumn of 1799 Walter Scott visited Bothwell Castle as a guest of Archibald Lord Douglas, and on a morning excursion to Craignethan Castle was so enraptured by the scene that his hosts offered him lifetime use of Andrew Hay's dwelling. He did not immediately turn this option down, but later circumstances prevented him from making this area his summer residence.

Scott's novel Old Mortality, published in 1816, was largely set in and around Tillietudlem Castle. Chapter XI describes the location: "All heads were now bent from the battlements of the turret, which commanded a distant prospect down the vale of the river. The Tower of Tillietudlem stood, or perhaps yet stands, upon the angle of a very precipitous bank, formed by the junction of a considerable brook with the Clyde." In June 1829 he wrote to his friend James Skene, who was preparing etchings to illustrate Scott's books, "I did not think on Craignethan in writing about Tillietudlem, and I believe it differs in several respects from my Chateau en Espagne. It is not on the Clyde in particular, and, if I recollect, the view is limited and wooded. But that can be no objection to adopting it as that which public taste has adopted as coming nearest to the ideal of the place." In the revised Magnum Edition of Old Mortality, published in 1830, Scott added a footnote: "The Castle of Tillietudlem is imaginary; but the ruins of Craignethan Castle, situated on the Nethan, about three miles from its junction with the Clyde, have something of the character of the description in the text". In September 1834 Scott's son in law John Gibson Lockhart took the artist J. M. W. Turner to visit Craignethan. Turner made a sketch of the castle from the north, seen across the Nethan Gorge, then made several drawings in and around the ruins.

Due to the association with Scott's novel, Craignethan castle became a popular place to visit. In 1876 Tillietudlem railway station was constructed on the Coalburn Branch of the nearby Caledonian Railway line. An 1880 tour guide description of an excursion "To the Falls of Clyde, Tillietudlem Castle, &c," says the station "is but a short walk from the castle". A small group of houses were constructed on the road past the station, as Fence Terrace, and this subsequently became the hamlet of Tillietudlem.
