= Braidwood railway station =

Disused railway station in Braidwood, South Lanarkshire

Braidwood
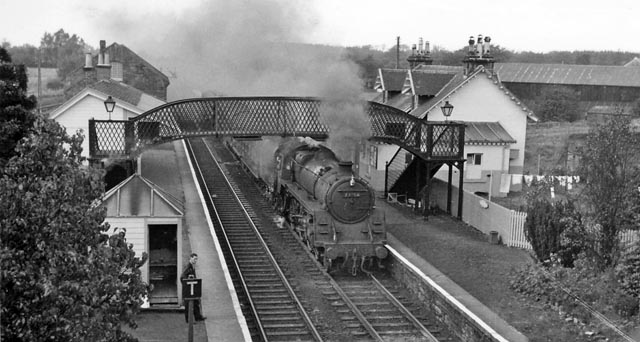
- The station in 1961

General information
- Location: Braidwood, South Lanarkshire; Scotland
- Coordinates: 55.7153°N 3.8337°W
- Grid reference: NS849484
- Platforms: 2

Other information
- Status: Disused

History
- Original company: Caledonian Railway
- Pre-grouping: Caledonian Railway
- Post-grouping: London, Midland and Scottish Railway; British Railways (Scottish Region)

Key dates
- August 1848: Opened
- 2 July 1962: Closed to passengers
- 6 July 1964: Closed to goods
Location

Braidwood railway station served the village of Braidwood, South Lanarkshire, Scotland from 1848 to 1962 on the Caledonian main line.

== History ==
The station opened in August 1848 by the Caledonian Railway. To the west was the goods yard with sidings that served Nellfield Saw Mills. To the east was the signal box and more sidings, one to the north serving Meadow Brick Works. The station closed to passengers on 2 July 1962 and closed to goods traffic on 6 July 1964.

| Preceding station | Historical railways | Following station |
|---|---|---|
| Cleghorn; Line open, station closed | Caledonian main line | Carluke; Line and station open |
