= River Nethan =

River in the United Kingdom

Nathan
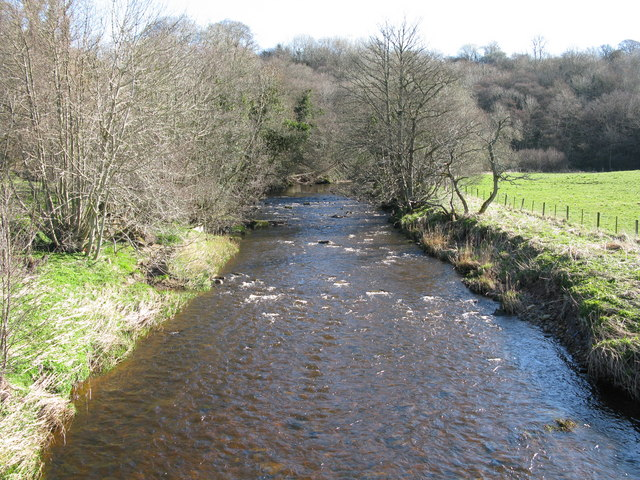

Location
- Country: Scotland

Physical characteristics
- Source
  - location: Glenbuck, East Ayrshire, Scotland
  - coordinates: 55°32′N 3°59′W
- Mouth: River Clyde
  - location: Crossford, South Lanarkshire, Scotland
  - coordinates: 55°42′00″N 3°52′15″W
- Length: 20.92 km (13.00 mi)

The River Nethan is a river which flows between Glenbuck in East Ayrshire and Crossford, South Lanarkshire where it feeds into the River Clyde, with the town of Lesmahagow and surrounding villages sitting on the river course. The area of woodland surrounding the River Nethan at Crossford and Auchenheath has been declared a site of special scientific interest and forms a part of the Clyde Valley Woodlands National Nature Reserve as Nethan Gorge. Craignethan Castle, a 16th-century fortification, overlooks the river.
