= Castle Qua =

Prehistoric fort in South Lanarkshire, Scotland

Coordinates: 55.6845°N 3.7925°W

- Location within South Lanarkshire
- Type: Prehistoric fort
- Location: Cartland Craigs; Lanark; South Lanarkshire; United Kingdom

Scheduled monument
- Official name: Castle Qua, fort 345m WSW of Mouse Bridge
- Designated: 18 July 1967
- Reference no.: SM2604

Castle Qua (also known as Castle Quaw or Castle-dykes) is the name given to an earthwork found in the Cartland Craigs National Nature Reserve near Lanark, South Lanarkshire. It is site number NS84SE 1 in the records of the Royal Commission on the Ancient and Historical Monuments of Scotland. It's believed to be a medieval structure.
