= Cleghorn railway station =

Disused railway station in Cleghorn, South Lanarkshire

Coordinates: 55.6916°N 3.7364°W

Cleghorn

General information
- Location: Cleghorn, South Lanarkshire; Scotland
- Platforms: 2

Other information
- Status: Disused

History
- Original company: Caledonian Railway
- Pre-grouping: Caledonian Railway
- Post-grouping: London, Midland and Scottish Railway; British Rail (Scottish Region)

Key dates
- 15 February 1848: Opened as Lanark
- 1 January 1855: Name changed to Cleghorn Junction
- 1 April 1864: Name changed to Cleghorn
- 4 January 1965: Closed
Location

Cleghorn railway station served the village of Cleghorn, South Lanarkshire, Scotland from 1848 to 1965 on the Caledonian main line.

== History ==
The station opened as Lanark on 15 February 1848 by the Caledonian Railway, although it was used earlier on 31 January 1848 by Mr Scott for a special service to Beattock. Its name was changed to Cleghorn Junction on 1 January 1855 when the Lanark branch opened. To the northeast was the goods yard and to the southeast was the signal box. The station's name changed again to Cleghorn on 1 April 1864. The station, along with the signal box, closed on 4 January 1965.

| Preceding station | Historical railways | Following station |
|---|---|---|
| Carstairs; Line and station open | Caledonian main line | Braidwood; Line open, station closed |
