= Mousemill Bridge =

Bridge in the South Lanarkshire, Scotland

Mousemill New Bridge
- Coordinates: 55.67795°N 3.80011°W
- Carries: Pedestrians and vehicles
- Crosses: Mouse Water
- Locale: South Lanarkshire
- Maintained by: South Lanarkshire Council
- Preceded by: Cartland Bridge
- Followed by: Crossford Bridge

History
- Construction end: Early 19th Century
- Replaces: Mousemill Old Bridge

Listed Building – Category B
- Official name: Mousemill Bridge
- Designated: 11 January 1971
- Reference no.: LB13060

Location
- Interactive map of Mousemill New Bridge

Mousemill Bridge is a crossing of the Mouse Water on Mousemill Road, just north of Kirkfieldbank. There are two bridges at the site, the present day road bridge and the old Mousemill Bridge which previously formed part of the road between Lanark and Hamilton through Kirkfieldbank but is today solely used by pedestrians.

== Mousemill Old Bridge ==
Mousemill Old Bridge
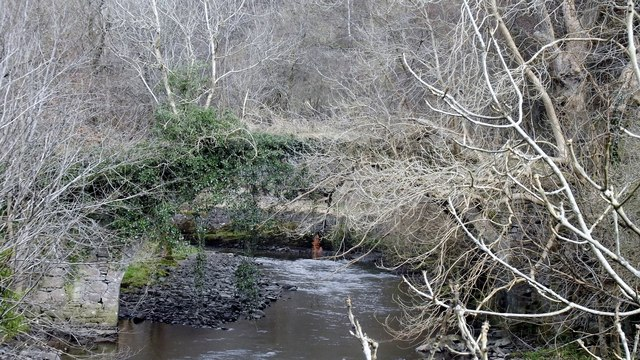
- Remains of Mousemill Old Bridge
- Coordinates: 55.67812°N 3.79940°W
- Crosses: Mouse Water
- Locale: South Lanarkshire
- Preceded by: Cartland Bridge
- Followed by: Crossford Bridge

History
- Construction end: c. 1649

Listed Building – Category B
- Official name: The Roman Bridge
- Designated: 11 January 1971
- Reference no.: LB13061

Location
- Interactive map of Mousemill Old Bridge

The old Mousemill Bridge originated as a wooden bridge and was first mentioned in 1587. A stone bridge replaced the wooden one around 1649. It is a Category B listed building with Historic Environment Scotland, being listed in 1971.

== See also ==
- List of bridges in Scotland
