= Avon Water =

Coordinates: 55.78065°N 4.01542°W

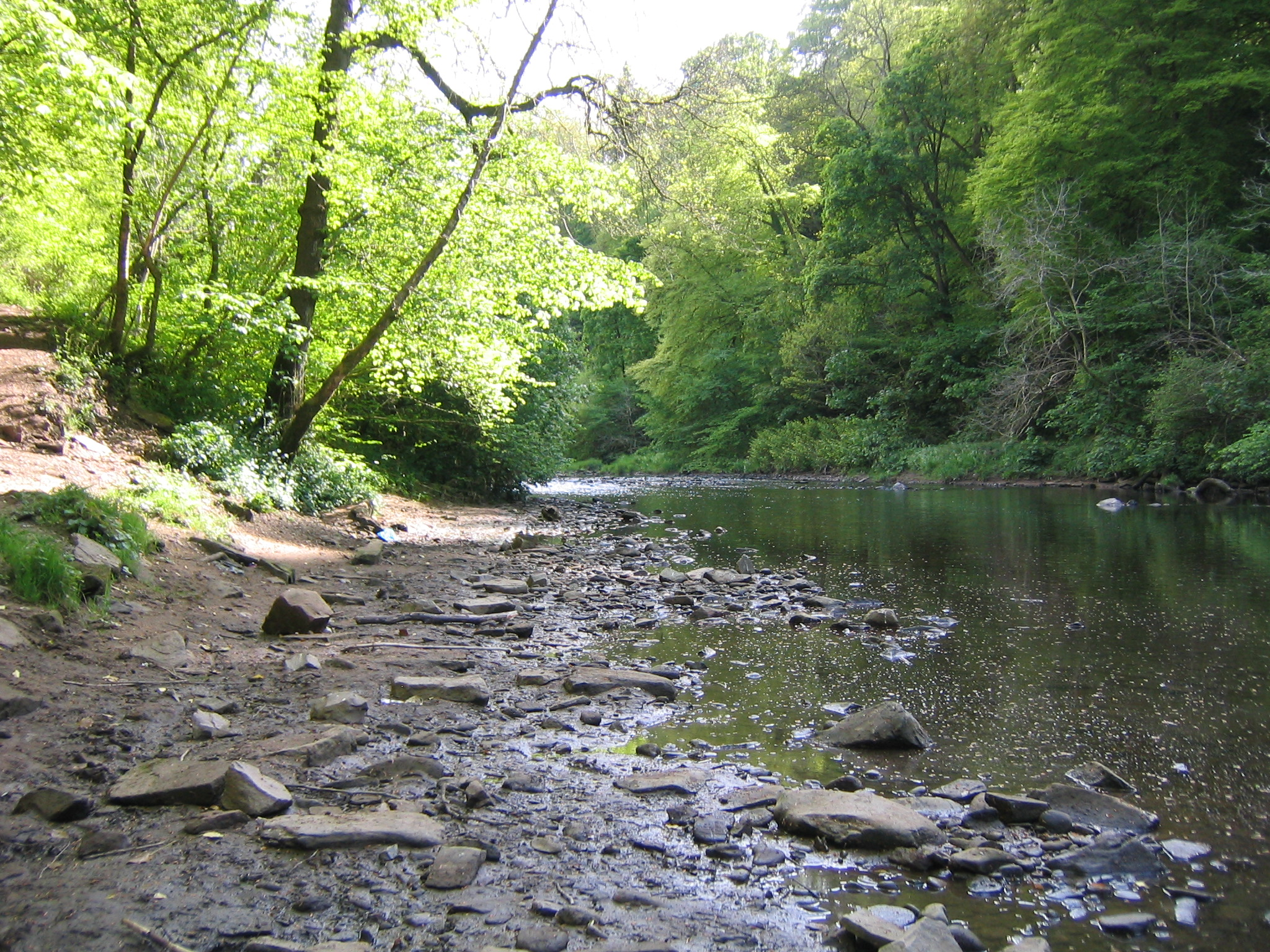
- The Avon Water in Chatelherault Country Park, Hamilton.

Location
- Country: United Kingdom, Scotland
- Region: South Lanarkshire

Physical characteristics
- Source
  - location: Distinkhorn Hill
- Mouth
  - location: Hamilton
- Length: 39 km (24 mi)

Avon Water, also known locally as the River Avon, is a 24-mile-long (39 km) river in Scotland, and a tributary of the River Clyde.

== Course ==
The Avon Water rises in the hills on the boundary between East Ayrshire and South Lanarkshire, close to the head of the Irvine Water. The river flows in a north easterly direction, following the A71 road past Drumclog, and running to the south of Strathaven, where the river enters a more pronounced valley. The Avon flows between the village of Glassford, and Stonehouse to the south, before merging with the smaller Cander Water just south of Larkhall. The river then skirts the west side of Larkhall in a deepening gorge, crossed by the disused Larkhall railway viaduct, built in 1904 for the Caledonian Railway.

Beyond this the gorge is part of Chatelherault Country Park, to the south of Hamilton. There are several public footpaths along this section of the gorge, although the area was once the preserve of the Duke of Hamilton, forming the hunting and pleasure grounds of the Dukes' former home, Hamilton Palace. Many features of this period remain in the park, including the Duke's Bridge which crosses the gorge. Older structures along the gorge include the ruins of Cadzow Castle, started in the 13th century, and the Cadzow Oaks, a group of oak trees, some of which are over 600 years old.

The river bends to the east at the end of the gorge between the villages of Barncluith and Ferniegair, flowing beneath three listed stone bridges: a viaduct carrying the Argyle Line railway tracks, a single-arch bridge carrying the A72 road, and the Old Avon Bridge, now a footbridge. The Avon Water flows north beneath the M74 motorway, merging into the Clyde between Hamilton and Motherwell, beside Junction 6 of the M74.

== Etymology ==
The name Avon is derived from the Brittonic *āβonā- (from āβ, "moving water", with the suffix –onā-), the word ancestral to Welsh afon, meaning "a river".
