= Crossford, South Lanarkshire =

Coordinates: 55°42′00″N 3°52′15″W

Crossford
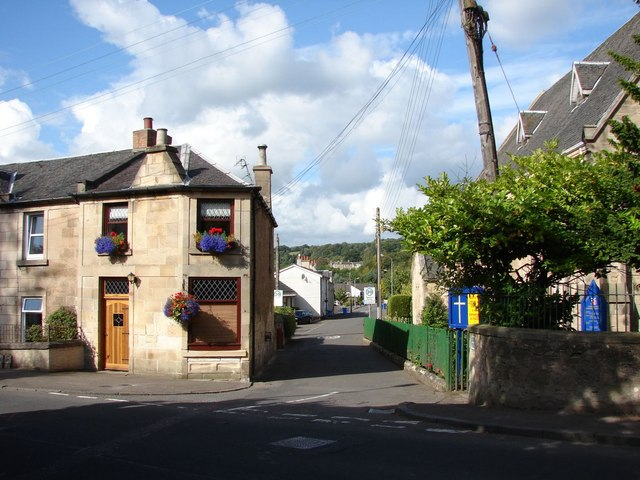
- Crossford, South Lanarkshire

- Location within South Lanarkshire
- Population: 730 (2020)
- OS grid reference: NS826466
- Council area: South Lanarkshire
- Lieutenancy area: Lanarkshire
- Country: Scotland
- Sovereign state: United Kingdom
- Post town: CARLUKE
- Postcode district: ML8
- Police: Scotland
- Fire: Scottish
- Ambulance: Scottish
- UK Parliament: Lanark and Hamilton East
- Scottish Parliament: Clydesdale

Crossford is a village in South Lanarkshire, Scotland.

Crossford lies on the A72, alongside the River Clyde and the River Nethan, 4 1/2 miles (7 kilometres) northwest of Lanark and nine miles (14 kilometres) southeast of Hamilton. It is home to a pub, the Tillietudlem Inn, and a village shop. The nearest primary school, Underbank Primary, is situated just out of Crossford whilst the nearest secondary is in Carluke, though pupils from the village attend Lanark Grammar School. The 317 bus service runs every 90 minutes to Hamilton and Lanark.

The 40-mile-long (65-kilometre) Clyde walkway footpath from Lanark to Glasgow passes through Crossford.
