= Nethan Gorge =

Lower Nethan Gorge
- Part of the Clyde Valley Woodlands National Nature Reserve
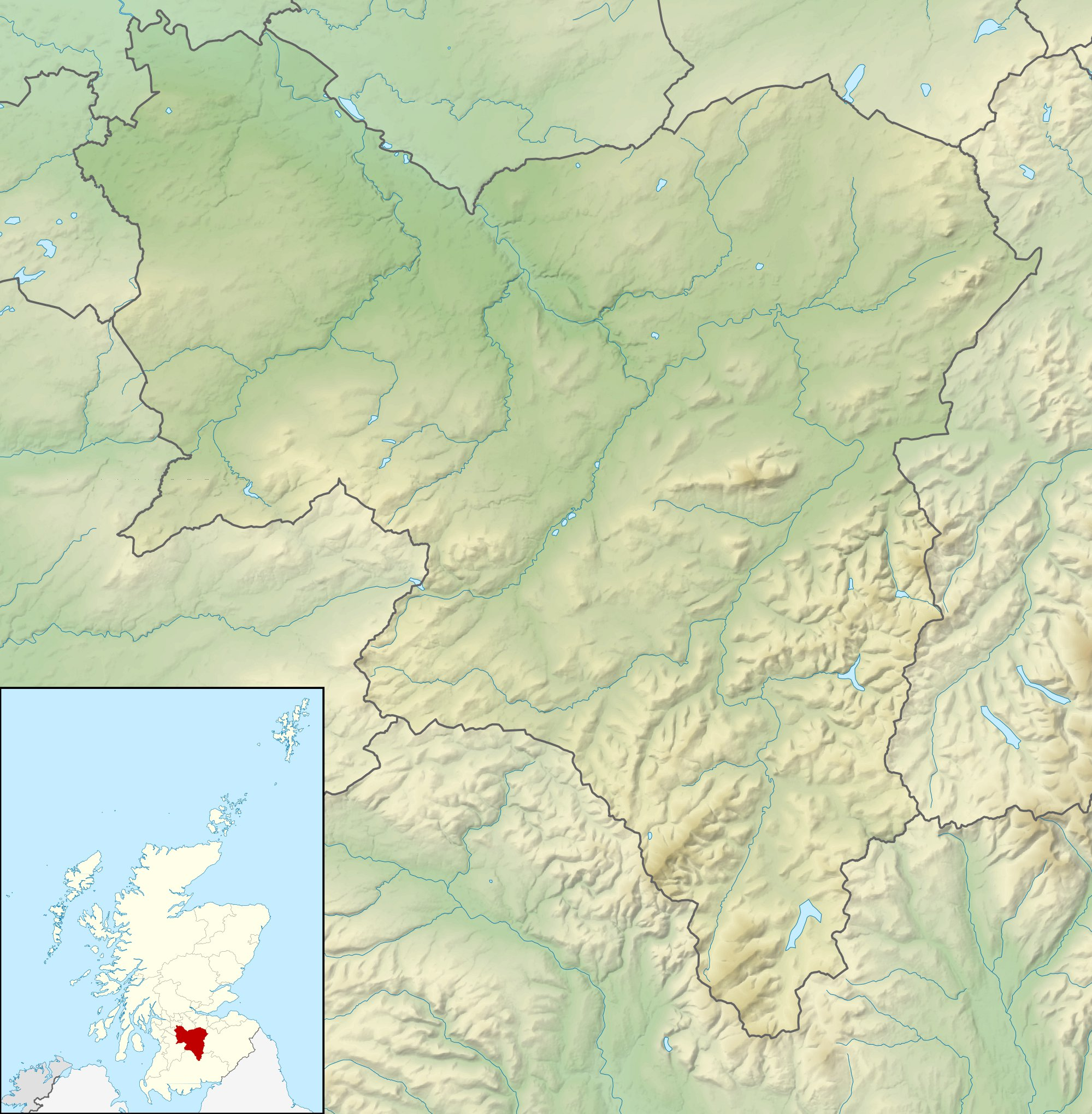
- Location within South Lanarkshire
- Location: South Lanarkshire, Scotland, United Kingdom
- Nearest city: Lanark
- Coordinates: 55°41′48.9763″N 3°52′55.9483″W
- Governing body: Scottish Wildlife Trust
- Website: scottishwildlifetrust.org.uk/reserve/lower-nethan-gorge/

Upper Nethan Gorge
- Part of the Clyde and Avon Valley Landscape Partnership and Clyde Valley Woodlands National Nature Reserve
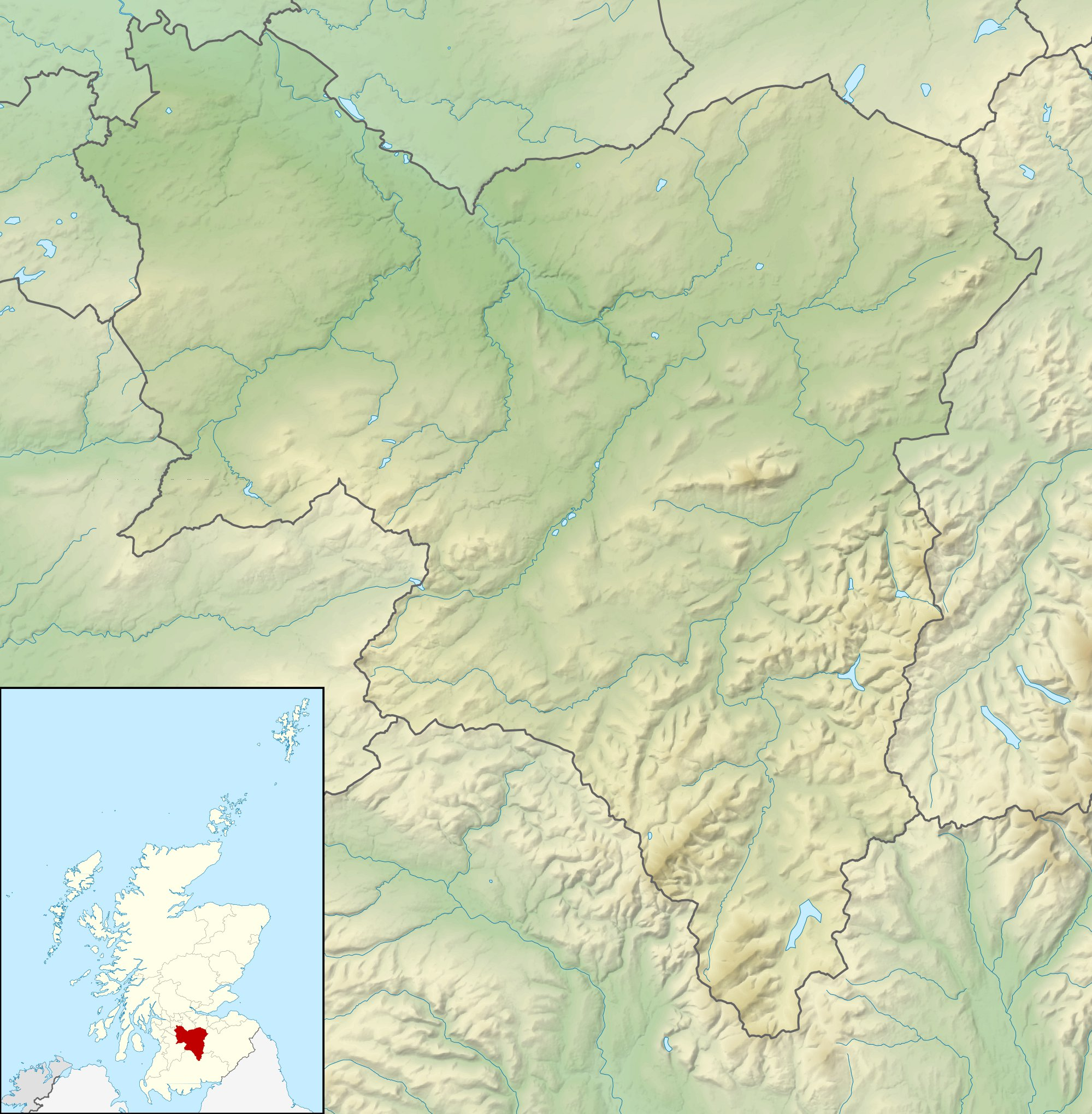
- Location within South Lanarkshire
- Location: South Lanarkshire, Scotland, United Kingdom
- Nearest city: Lesmahagow
- Coordinates: 55°41′2.648″N 3°54′27.4095″W
- Governing body: Scottish Wildlife Trust
- Website: scottishwildlifetrust.org.uk/reserve/upper-nethan-gorge/

Nethan Gorge is a natural gorge carved by the River Nethan, in South Lanarkshire, Scotland.

== Geography ==
Nethan Gorge is split into two officially designated and actively protected Sites of Special Scientific Interest, Lower Nethan Gorge and Upper Nethan Gorge.

Both sites are referred to as nature reserves by the owner, the Scottish Wildlife Trust. They are also both contributing reserves to the Clyde Valley Woodlands National Nature Reserve.

=== Lower Nethan Gorge ===
The Lower Nethan Gorge reserve, near Lanark, is one of the best examples of semi-natural woodland still surviving in the Clyde Valley. Ash and elm woodlands grow on its steep slopes.

The gorge is home to many species of flora and fauna, including green woodpeckers, otters, and badgers.

Lower Nethan Gorge was declared a part of the Clyde Valley Woodlands National Nature Reserve in 2007.

=== Upper Nethan Gorge ===
The Upper Nethan Gorge reserve, near Blackwood and Lesmahagow, is part of the Clyde and Avon Valley Landscape Partnership and the Clyde Valley Woodlands National Nature Reserve.

The reserve's woodlands support a large range of species, including locally uncommon plants such as broad-leaved helleborine (Epipactis helleborine), wood melick (Melica uniflora), and meadow saxifrage (Saxifraga granulata).

Great spotted woodpeckers and buzzards can also be seen.

== See also ==
- Sites of Special Scientific Interest in Scotland
- Protected areas of South Lanarkshire
