= Cartland Bridge =

Bridge in the South Lanarkshire, Scotland

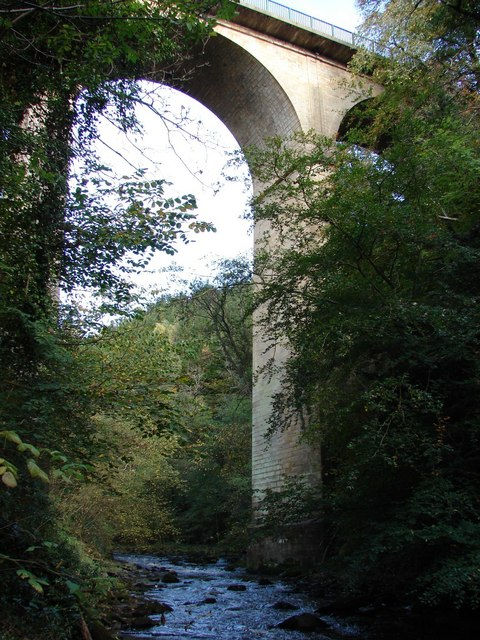
- View of the bridge from the river below
- Coordinates: 55.680510°N 3.800458°W
- Carries: A73
- Crosses: Mouse Water
- Locale: South Lanarkshire
- Maintained by: South Lanarkshire Council
- Preceded by: Cleghorn Bridge
- Followed by: Mousemill Bridge

Characteristics
- Design: Arch
- Material: Dressed stone
- Height: 39 metres (128 ft)

History
- Designer: Thomas Telford; Robert Hutchison
- Construction start: 1821
- Construction end: 1822

Listed Building – Category B
- Official name: Cartland Bridge
- Designated: 11 January 1971
- Reference no.: LB13054

Location
- Interactive map of Cartland Bridge

Cartland Bridge is a road bridge on the A73 north-west of Lanark, South Lanarkshire which spans the Mouse Water, a tributary of the River Clyde. The three-span bridge was built in 1822, to designs by the engineer Thomas Telford. It is a category B listed building.

== See also ==
- List of bridges in Scotland
