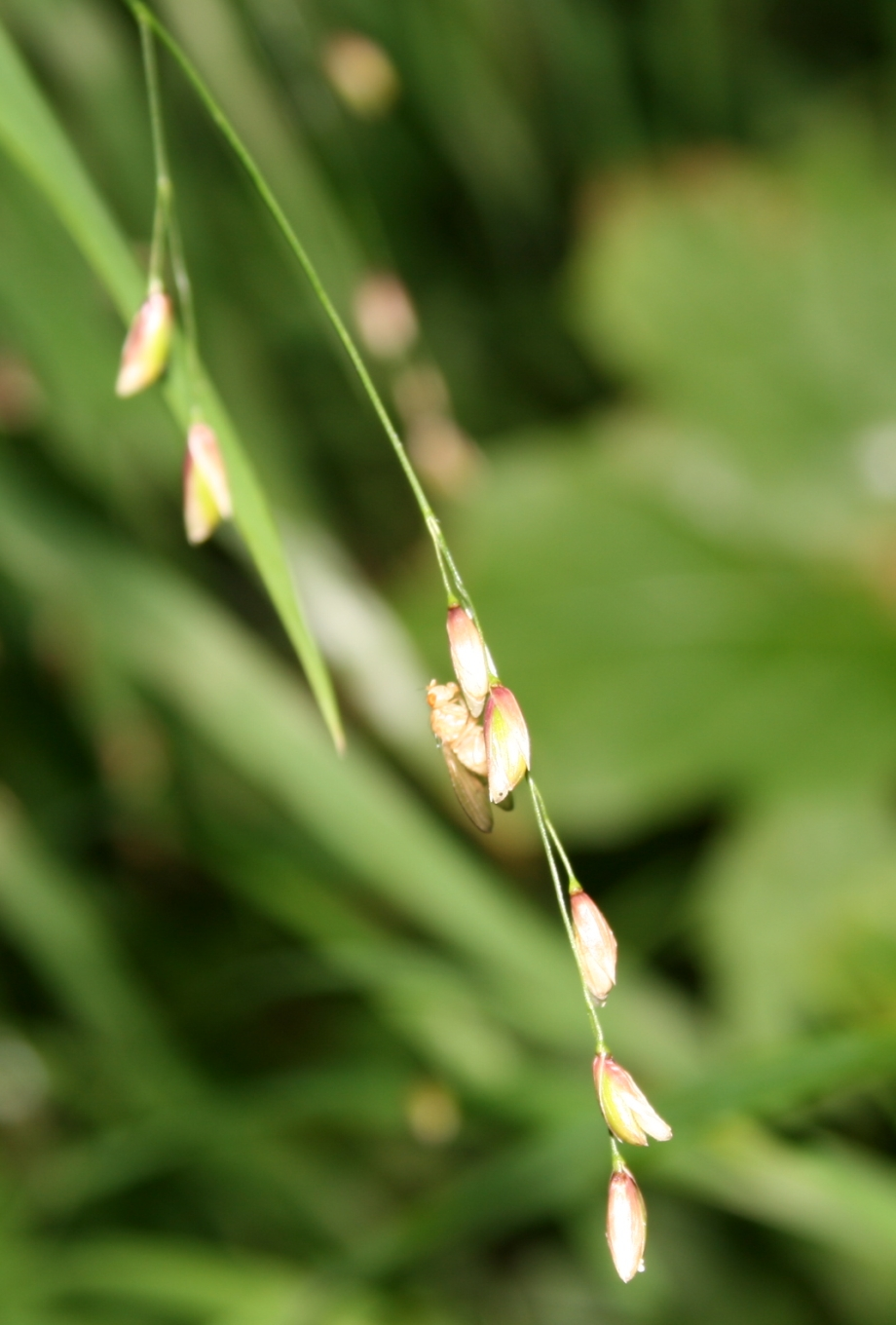

Scientific classification
- Kingdom: Plantae
- Clade: Tracheophytes
- Clade: Angiosperms
- Clade: Monocots
- Clade: Commelinids
- Order: Poales
- Family: Poaceae
- Subfamily: Pooideae
- Genus: Melica
- Species: M. uniflora

Binomial name
- Melica uniflora Retz.

= Melica uniflora =

Species of grass

Melica uniflora, commonly known as wood melick, is a species of grass in the family Poaceae that is native to much of Europe, and to parts of South West Asia and North Africa.

== Description ==
The species rhizomes are elongated. The culms are 20–60 centimetres (7.9–23.6 in) long with leaf-blades being of 5–20 centimetres (2.0–7.9 in) in length and 3–7 millimetres (0.12–0.28 in) wide. The leaf-blade bottom is pubescent, rough and scaberulous. It has an open panicle which is both effuse and elliptic and is 6–22 centimetres (2.4–8.7 in) long and 1–12 centimetres (0.39–4.72 in) wide. The main branches have 1–6 fertile spikelets which are located on lower branches which are also scaberulous. Spikelets do ascend and have pedicelled fertile spikelets. Pedicels are 2–5 millimetres (0.079–0.197 in) long and are straight. The fertile floret lemma is both chartaceous and elliptic and is 5–7 millimetres (0.20–0.28 in) long. Lower glumes are oblong and are 3–6 millimetres (0.12–0.24 in) in length. Flowers have 3 anthers which are 1.5–2.3 millimetres (0.059–0.091 in) long with the fruits being 3.5 millimetres (0.14 in) long. The fruits are also ellipsoid and have an additional pericarp with linear hilum.

== Taxonomy ==
Swedish naturalist Anders Jahan Retzius described the wood melick in 1779.

== Distribution and habitat ==
The species can be found in such Asian countries as Iran and Turkey and in European ones such as Balearic Islands, Faroe Islands, Finland, Iceland, Moldova, Portugal, Spain, and Sweden. Also it was recorded in Algeria, Morocco and Tunisia.

== Ecology and habitat ==
The species is growing on plains and on elevation of 950 metres (3,120 ft) in the Black Forest and on elevation of 1,200 metres (3,900 ft) in Alps. It can be found in hardwood forests near Fagus species. It also grows in dry and moist woodlands, which can either be acidic or neutral. Sandy or rocky soils are also common for such plants, but they need to be deep and loany as well. It grows on loamy soils in the north, while prefers decalcified soils in the south. The species is identical to Fagatalia which can be found in the Fagetum lowlands and also in the Carpinion. It rarely occurs in the Quercion clusters. Flowers bloom from May to July. Mostly, ants feed on the species caryopsis.

== Melica uniflora in cultivation ==
Melica uniflora f. albida has been awarded the Royal Horticultural Society's 'Award of Garden Merit'.

== Melica uniflora in culture ==
In the 19th century it was engraved on the illustration by Jacob Sturm in the book Deutschlands Flora in Abbildungen nach der Natur mit Beschreibungen which was published in Nuremberg in 1862.
