= Chatelherault Country Park =

Scottish country park

Coordinates: 55°45′45″N 04°00′54″W

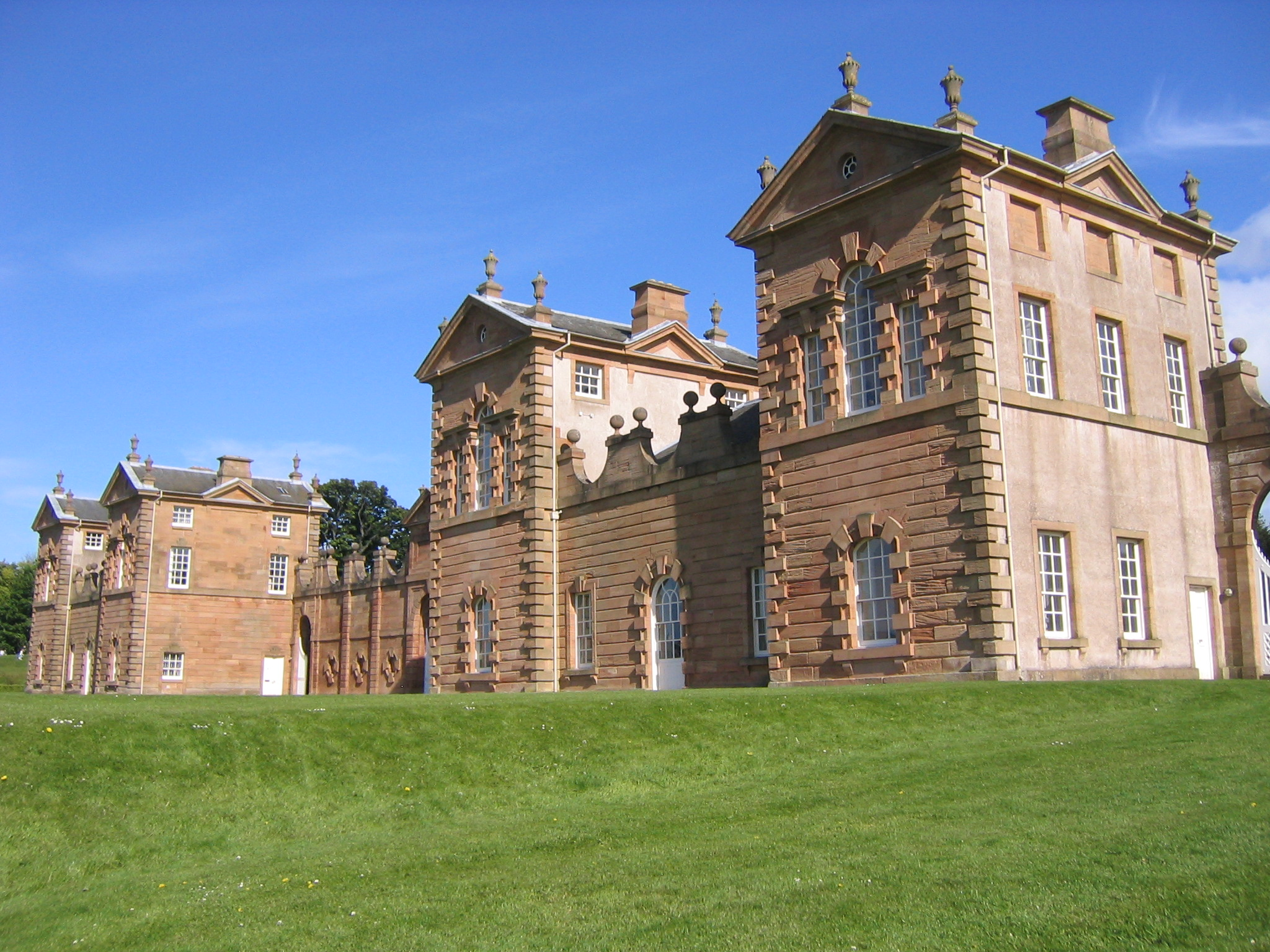
- The Duke of Hamilton's hunting lodge, renovated in the 1970s
- Interactive map of Chatelherault Country Park
- Type: Country park
- Location: Ferniegair, Scotland
- Nearest town: Hamilton
- Area: 500 acres (200 ha)
- Created: 1987
- Operator: South Lanarkshire Council

Inventory of Gardens and Designed Landscapes in Scotland
- Official name: Chatelherault (Wham)
- Designated: 30 June 1987
- Reference no.: GDL00101

Chatelherault Country Park is a country park in Hamilton, South Lanarkshire, Scotland. It is located in the village of Ferniegair, 1 1/4 miles (2 kilometres) from Hamilton town centre. On the west side of the park, runs the Avon, a tributary of the River Clyde.

Its name is derived from the French town of Châtellerault, the title Duc de Châtellerault having been granted to James Hamilton, 2nd Earl of Arran in 1548 for his part in arranging the marriage of Mary, Queen of Scots, to Francis, Dauphin of France.

== History ==
The ancient kings of Strathclyde owned a hunting lodge and royal palace in the woodlands near Cadzow, the old name for Hamilton. A Bronze Age burial site was found in the forest, with an urn and the body of a woman having been undisturbed for up to 3000 years. It is possible that during the early medieval age, this land was the power centre of the lost kingdom of Goddau, which is mentioned in Old Welsh poetry from the 6th century. Queen Langoureth of Strathclyde is said to be the first and last ruler of this kingdom, before it was likely reincorporated back into Strathclyde.

After Strathclyde ceased to be independent in the 11th century, the hunting lodge and palace came under Scottish control, and at some point the site became Cadzow Castle.

The country park is centred on the former hunting lodge, a folly designed to be seen from the now demolished Hamilton Palace at the end of a broad grass slope forming an avenue with lines of lime trees. The lodge was designed by William Adam and completed in 1734. It comprises two buildings, linked by a gateway, in the form of four pavilions above a garden wall. The north facade was visible from the palace and forms the front of the building. To the rear are formal parterre gardens. The buildings provided kennels, stables and accommodation for hunting parties returning from the woodlands to the south. Adam jokingly referred to his creation as 'The Dogg Kennel'.

From 1591, Hamilton Palace became the main residence of the Dukes of Hamilton. Rebuilding as the largest country house in Scotland with an imposing Palladian south front began in 1684, then from 1822 Alexander, 10th Duke of Hamilton had the palace considerably enlarged as a setting for a major art collection, with the north front designed by David Hamilton. Due to debts the art collection was sold in 1882, and the family moved out. In 1889 the 12th Duke leased out coal mining under the Low Parks, and further leasing in 1915 extended the mines under the house itself, causing subsidence to the palace which was sold for demolition in 1921. The ground in front of the lodge was excavated for sand quarrying. The resulting subsidence has created a noticeably lopsided feel in the lodge: coins will roll across the floor, and many visitors report feeling unbalanced and ill. The quarrying was halted in the 1970s, following the death of the 14th Duke. The High and Low parks of Hamilton were given to the nation in lieu of death duties. Historic Scotland began renovating the lodge in the late 1970s, including the fine Georgian plasterwork, and a visitor centre was built to the rear. The lodge and park were opened to the public in 1987 and are now managed by South Lanarkshire Council.

The ruins of Cadzow Castle lie above the gorge of the Avon Water, which runs to the west of the lodge. The bulk of the park lies along the Avon gorge, with woodland walks and cycle routes. A herd of Cadzow cattle live in the fields overlooked by the hunting lodge. This apparently unique breed have white coats and long horns.

In December 2005, access to Chatelherault Country Park was improved with the opening of Chatelherault railway station near to the entrance of the park. This provides two trains from Glasgow (via Hamilton) per hour.

From July 2017 a programme commenced to remove a large area of non-native conifers from the area around the hunting lodge opening views onto the Duke’s Bridge, Cadzow Castle and the Avon Gorge.

== Views of Cadzow's ancient oak woodlands ==
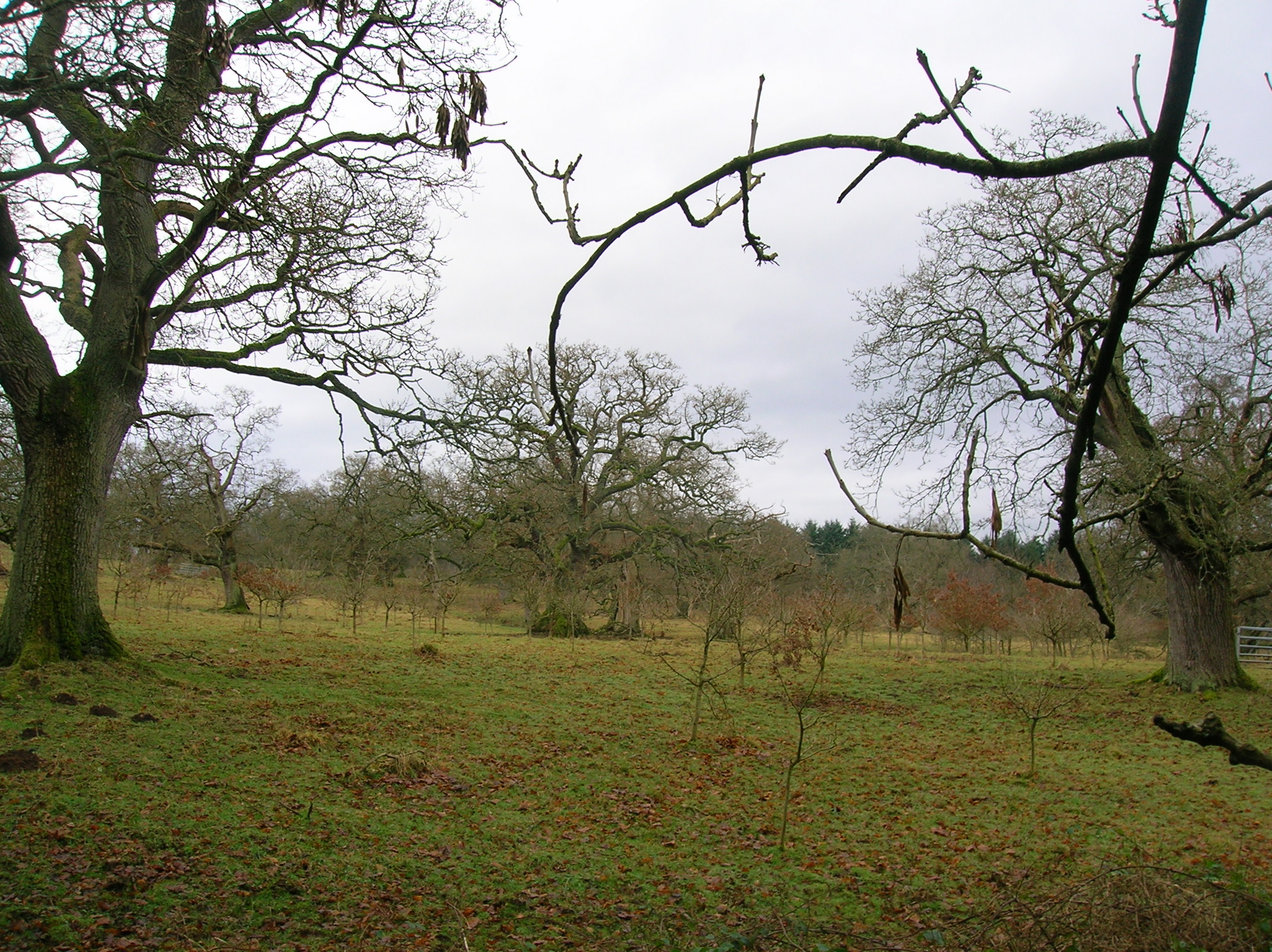
The oak woodland showing new plantings

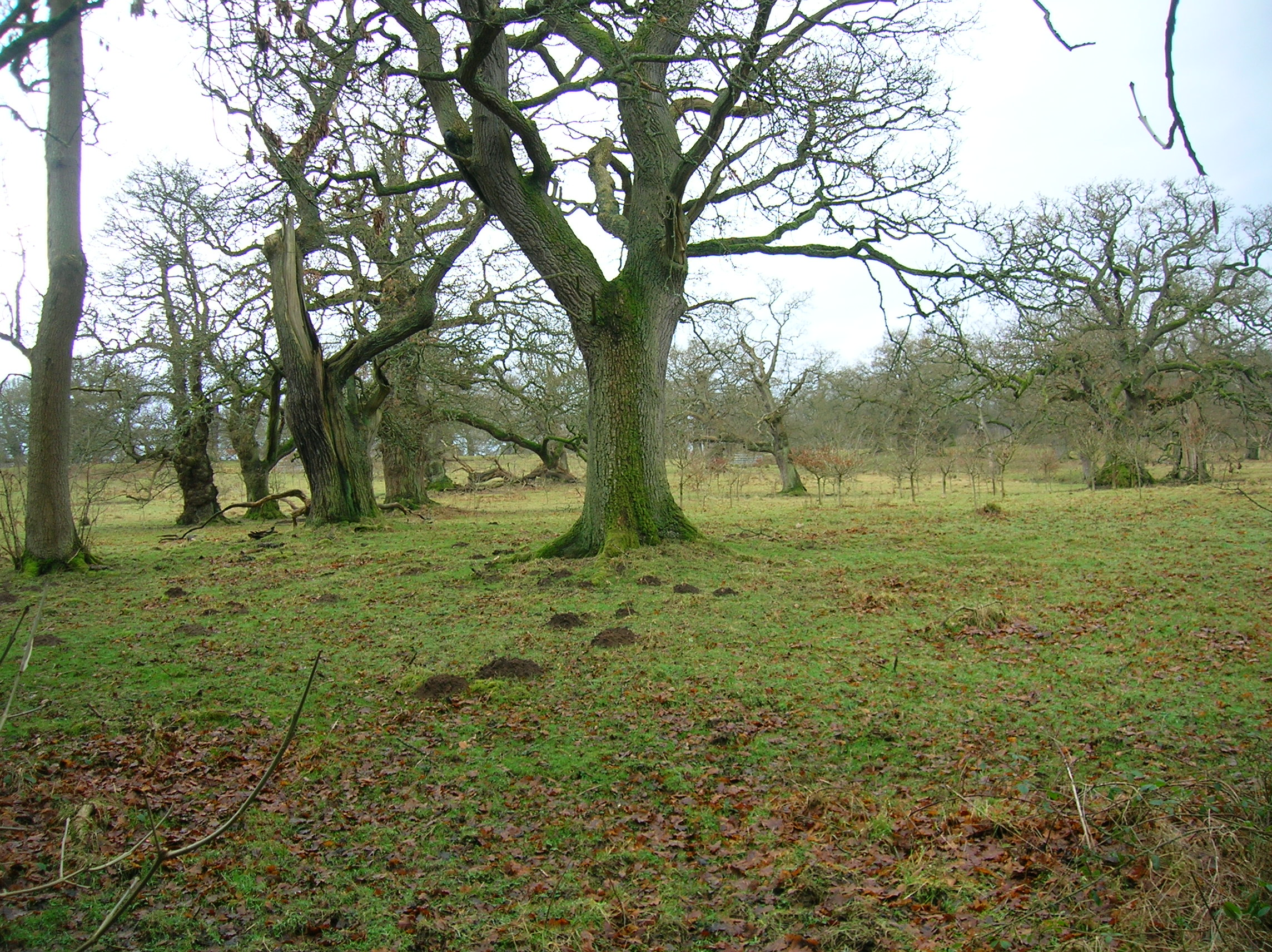
The woodland trees are widely spaced.

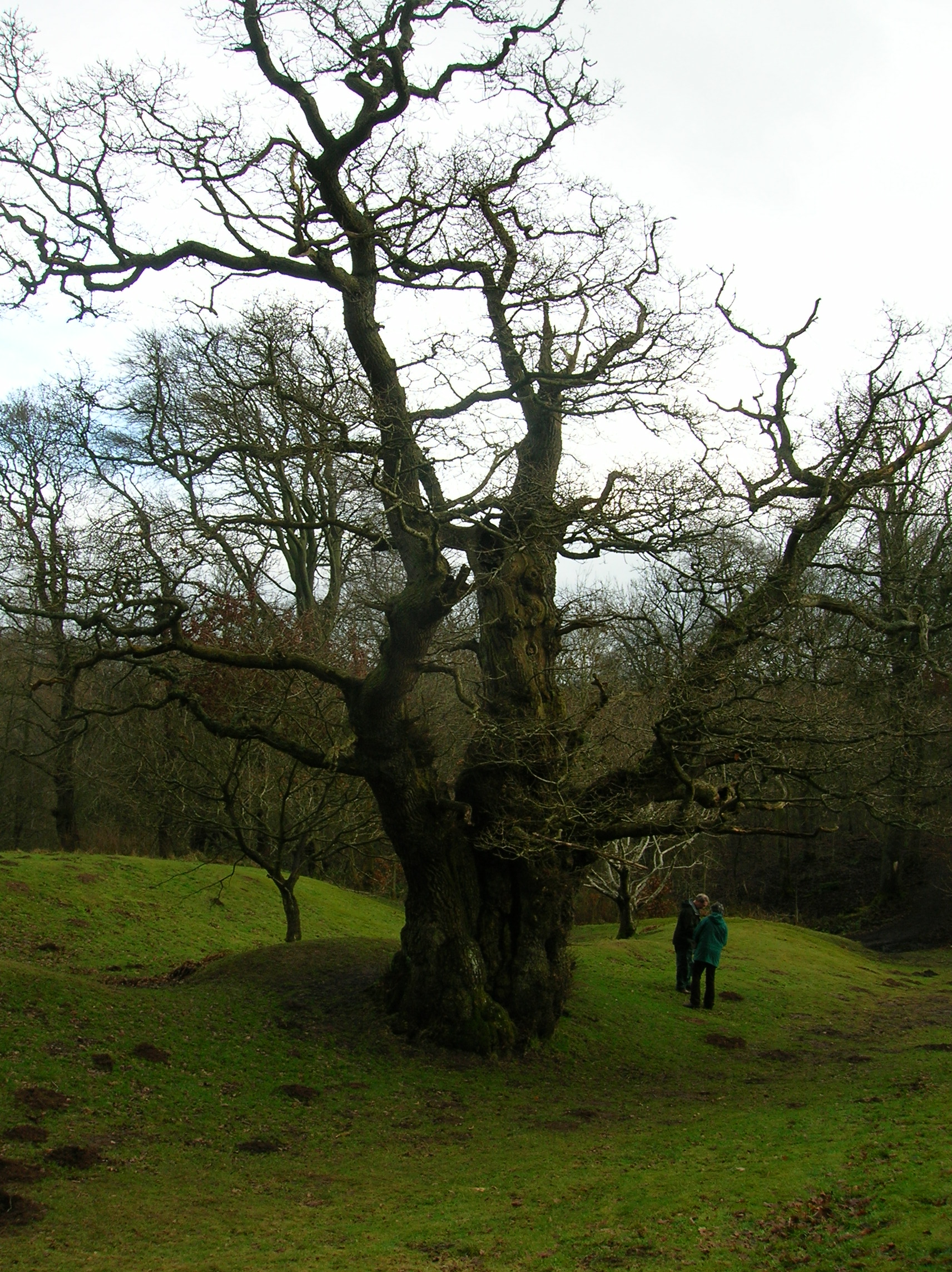
An ancient specimen oak

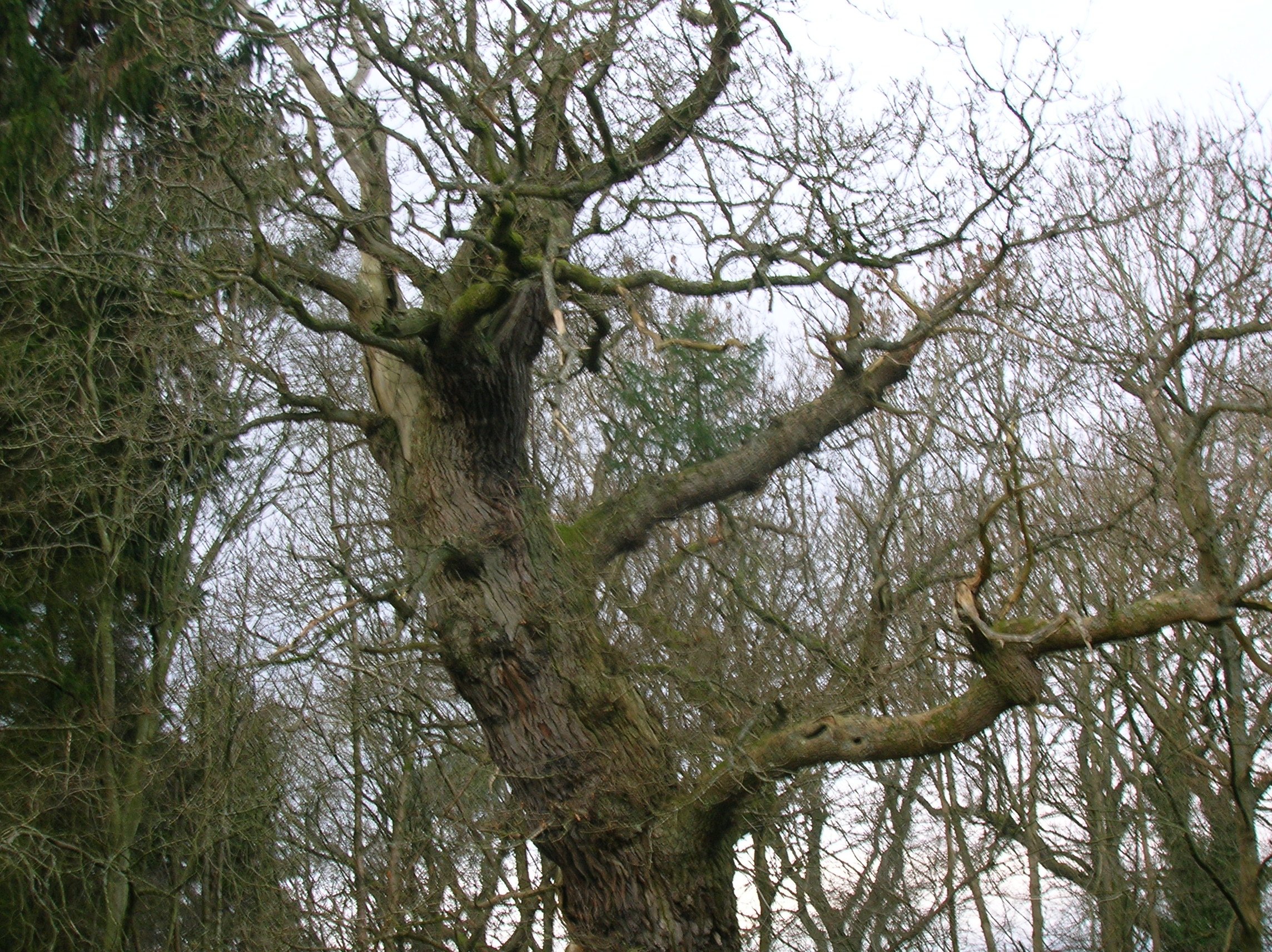
Detail of the main trunk and branches of an ancient oak
