= Lanark Sheriff Court =

Judicial building in Lanark, Scotland

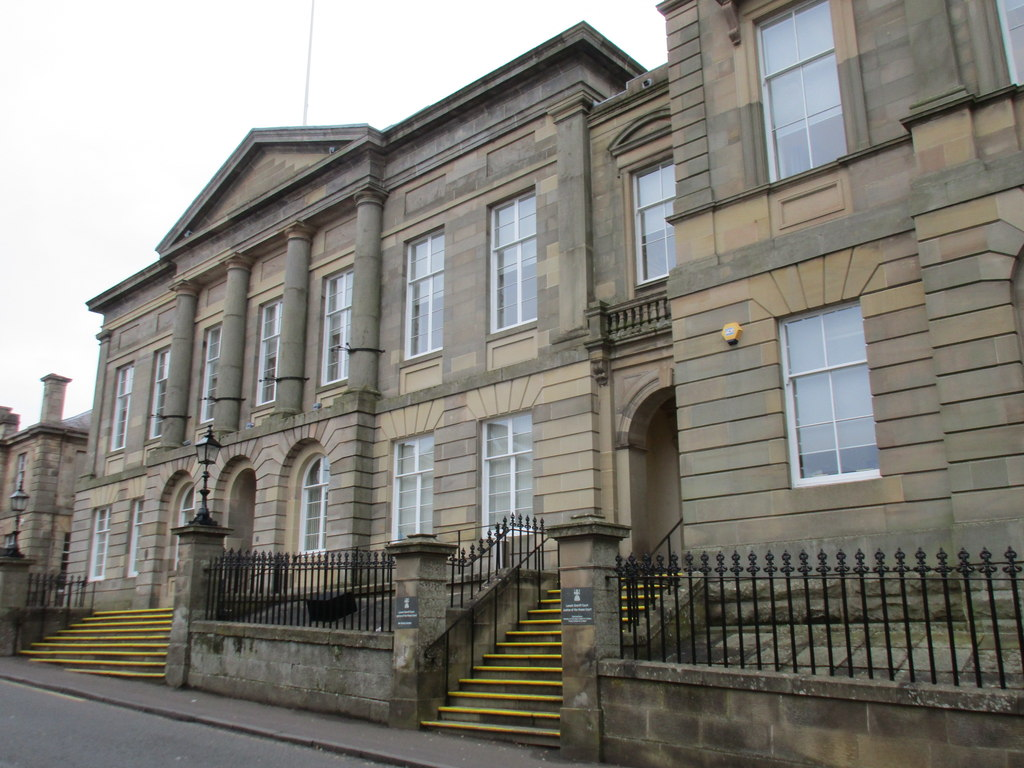
- Lanark Sheriff Court

- Shown in South Lanarkshire
- 55.6749°N 3.7812°W
- Location: Hope Street, Lanark

History
- Built: 1836

Site notes
- Architect: Hugh Marr
- Architectural style: Neoclassical style

Listed Building – Category B
- Official name: Lanark Sheriff Court and Justice of the Peace Court, including boundary wall, gatepiers and railings, and excluding 2-storey, flat-roofed extension to east, Hope Street, Lanark
- Designated: 12 January 1971
- Reference no.: LB37016

Lanark Sheriff Court is a judicial building in Hope Street, Lanark, South Lanarkshire, Scotland. The building, which continues to serve as the local courthouse, is a Category B listed building.

== History ==
The original venue for the administration of justice in the town was Lanark Castle. In the 14th century, the castle was destroyed and both judicial and municipal business moved to the tolbooth in the High Street, with prison cells on the ground floor and a courtroom on the first floor. The building, in its present incarnation, dates from 1778. By the 1830s, the tolbooth was dilapidated and it was decided to commission new public buildings: a site was selected in Hope Street. The new building was designed by Hugh Marr in the neoclassical style, built in ashlar stone and was completed in 1836.

The design involved a symmetrical main frontage of seven bays facing onto Hope Street. The central section of three bays, which was slightly projected forward, featured a round headed doorway flanked by two round headed windows. On the first floor there was a tetrastyle portico formed by Doric order columns supporting an entablature and a pediment. The outer sections of two bays each were fenestrated by sash windows on both floors and on the first floor, at the corners, there were Doric order pilasters supporting an entablature and a cornice. The building when completed was referred to as the "County Buildings". (Note: Until 1890, Lanarkshire was divided into three administrative wards: lower (Glasgow), middle (Hamilton) and upper (Lanark) and this building was the meeting place for the upper ward. After the formation of Lanarkshire County Council in 1890, the county council also sometimes met in the Hope Street building.)

The building was extended significantly to the south, by the addition of a courthouse building, in 1868. The design of the courthouse involved a symmetrical main frontage of five bays facing onto Hope Street. The central section of three bays, which was slightly projected forward, featured three round headed windows on the ground floor. On the first floor there were three sash windows with brackets supporting cornices or, in the case of the central window, a pediment. The windows were flanked by Doric order pilasters supporting an entablature, a cornice and a balustraded parapet. The outer bays were fenestrated in a similar style and, at the corners, there were rusticated pilasters also supporting the entablature, cornice and balustraded parapet. Internally, the principal room was the main courtroom.

The complex continued to serve as the meeting place of Lanark Burgh Council for much of the 20th century but ceased to be the local seat of government when the enlarged Lanark District Council was formed at the council offices in South Vennel in 1975. The complex also continued to serve as the local sheriff court throughout the 20th century and into the 21st century. In 2002, the Scottish Courts and Tribunals Service acquired County Buildings and implemented a major programme of refurbishment works which involved the conversion of County Buildings to create a second courtroom. The new courtroom entered service in 2004.

== See also ==
- List of listed buildings in Lanark, South Lanarkshire
