= Hyndford Quarry =

- Location of Hyndford Quarry within South Lanarkshire.
- Location: Lanark, South Lanarkshire, Scotland; 55°39′26.82″N 3°44′43.76″W
- Products: Aggregates
- Company: Cemex
- Website: cemexlocations.co.uk

Hyndford Quarry is an aggregates quarry in Lanark, South Lanarkshire operated by Cemex UK. It takes its name from the nearby village of Hyndford and has an entry on the register of the Royal Commission on the Ancient and Historical Monuments of Scotland. The quarry is bordered to the south by the River Clyde, to the west by Robiesland Farm, to the north by Lanark Racecourse and to the east by Hyndford. The quarry is a restricted area, but can be viewed from the road to New Lanark through Robbiesland Farm, which runs in parallel to Hyndford Quarry's west boundary.

== Extension Plans ==
In 2010, the operators announced controversial plans to extend Hyndford Quarry into the Buffer Zone of the UNESCO World Heritage Site of New Lanark and the Falls of Clyde Designed Landscape.

The application was submitted to South Lanarkshire Council in November 2012, and included a proposal for two extensions: a Southern Extension which lay outside the Buffer Zone, and a Western Extension that would have entered the Buffer Zone.

Opposition to the Western Extension was led by a local group called Save Our Landscapes which gathered a petition of 7,000 names and more than 11,500 objection letters by the time the decision went to the Planning Committee. The proposed Western Extension was also opposed by the New Lanark Trust, the Royal Burgh of Lanark Community Council, the New Lanark Community Council, the Lanark and District Civic Trust, the Garden History Society in Scotland, the UK Committee of the International Council on Monuments and Sites (ICOMOS-UK) and the Scottish Wildlife Trust (which manages the reserve at the Falls of Clyde). However, the application was not opposed by Historic Scotland, the Scottish Government's Executive Agency responsible for heritage - a decision which generated much controversy.

The local authority Planning Committee approved the application in December 2013, after an amendment moved by an SNP councillor was defeated. A campaign then followed to have the application called-in by Scottish Ministers. They took the unusual decision (in the circumstances) to do this at the end of January 2013.

The principal opponents of the quarry united to form a single umbrella group called the New Lanark and Falls of Clyde Working Group, and were represented by John Campbell QC. The matter was considered by Reporters at a hearing held in Lanark in August 2014. The Reporters issued a report supportive of the application in February 2015, but Ministers issued a notice of intent in June 2015 indicating that they would reject the Western Extension (but allow the Southern Extension). The Reporters were requested by Ministers to draw up conditions for the Southern Extension, to discuss these with the parties, and to report back to them. A final decision will then be issued by Ministers.
