= List of listed buildings in Lanark, South Lanarkshire =

This is a list of listed buildings in the parish of Lanark in South Lanarkshire, Scotland.

== List ==
Name	Location	Date Listed	Grid Ref. (Note: Sometimes known as OSGB36, the grid reference (where provided) is based on the British national grid reference system used by the Ordnance Survey. • "Guide to National Grid". Ordnance Survey. • "Get-a-map". Ordnance Survey.)	Geo-coordinates	Notes	LB Number (Note: Historic Environment Scotland assign a unique alphanumeric identifier to each designated site in Scotland, for listed buildings this always begins with "LB", for example "LB12345".)	Image
Bankhead Farm, Including Farmhouse, Steading And Boundary Walls				55°39′56″N 3°46′33″W	Category C(S)	43024	Upload Photo
New Lanark, Mill No 1				55°39′49″N 3°46′58″W	Category A	37051	Upload another image
New Lanark, Scottish Wildlife Trust Visitor Centre (Former Foundry, Later Dyeworks)				55°39′42″N 3°46′49″W	Category A	37055	Upload Photo
Sisters Of Charity Convent, St Vincent Place				55°40′22″N 3°46′23″W	Category C(S)	37063	Upload Photo
Gates To St Mary's Precinct, St Vincent Place				55°40′22″N 3°46′22″W	Category C(S)	37064	Upload Photo
2 And 4 Wellgate, Clydesdale Bank				55°40′24″N 3°46′48″W	Category C(S)	37071	Upload Photo
16 And 18 Wellgate				55°40′23″N 3°46′46″W	Category C(S)	37075	Upload Photo
20-26 (Even Numbers Only) Wellgate				55°40′23″N 3°46′46″W	Category C(S)	37076	Upload Photo
7 West Port				55°40′26″N 3°46′59″W	Category C(S)	37086	Upload Photo
39 West Port				55°40′27″N 3°47′04″W	Category C(S)	37090	Upload Photo
25, 27, 29 High Street				55°40′26″N 3°46′46″W	Category C(S)	36987	Upload Photo
47 And 49 High Street				55°40′25″N 3°46′44″W	Category C(S)	36993	Upload Photo
4, 6, 8 And 10 Hope Street				55°40′27″N 3°46′54″W	Category C(S)	37012	Upload Photo
1 And 3 Hyndford Place				55°40′24″N 3°46′50″W	Category C(S)	37019	Upload Photo
Cemetery Chapel, Hyndford Road				55°40′10″N 3°46′06″W	Category A	37029	Upload another image
New Lanark Road, Braxfield House, Stables				55°40′08″N 3°47′15″W	Category B	37036	Upload Photo
New Lanark 1-10 (Inclusive Nos) Braxfield Row				55°39′54″N 3°47′02″W	Category A	37038	Upload Photo
New Lanark, 9-16 (Inclusive Nos) Caithness Row With Garages (Former Abattoir)				55°39′45″N 3°46′46″W	Category A	37040	Upload Photo
New Lanark, 1-14 (Inclusive Nos) Long Row				55°39′53″N 3°47′01″W	Category A	37043	Upload Photo
New Lanark, New Buildings				55°39′50″N 3°46′52″W	Category A	37045	Upload another image
19 And 21 Bannatyne Street				55°40′26″N 3°46′29″W	Category C(S)	36927	Upload Photo
4 And 6 Bloomgate				55°40′26″N 3°46′50″W	Category B	36937	Upload Photo
4-16 (Even Nos Only) Broomgate				55°40′25″N 3°46′52″W	Category C(S)	36951	Upload Photo
13 & 15 Castlegate				55°40′24″N 3°46′49″W	Category C(S)	36966	Upload Photo
56 And 58 Castlegate				55°40′19″N 3°46′57″W	Category C(S)	36973	Upload Photo
St Nicholas Parish Church High Street				55°40′25″N 3°46′50″W	Category B	36981	Upload another image See more images
Baronald (Cartland Bridge Hotel), Stable Block And Walled Garden				55°40′51″N 3°47′38″W	Category C(S)	13344	Upload Photo
Road To Bonnington Mains And Robbiesland, Cast-Iron Bridge, Over Former Lanark-Muirkirk Railway				55°39′47″N 3°45′06″W	Category B	13069	Upload Photo
New Lanark, Water Houses				55°39′48″N 3°46′59″W	Category A	46471	Upload Photo
Hyndford Road, Former Lady Hozier Convalescent Home And Boundary Walls				55°40′12″N 3°45′45″W	Category C(S)	47972	Upload Photo
46A, 48 And 48A Bannatyne Street, Lanark Bingo, Former Regal Cinema And Shops				55°40′23″N 3°46′26″W	Category C(S)	51103	Upload Photo
New Lanark, Education Centre (Formerly The School)				55°39′45″N 3°46′49″W	Category A	37050	Upload another image
2 Park Place				55°40′32″N 3°47′10″W	Category B	37060	Upload Photo
St Mary's Rc Church, St Vincent Place				55°40′20″N 3°46′24″W	Category A	37062	Upload another image See more images
St Mary's Church Hall, St Vincent Place				55°40′21″N 3°46′25″W	Category A	37065	Upload Photo
6-8 Wellgate				55°40′24″N 3°46′47″W	Category B	37072	Upload Photo
10 Wellgate				55°40′24″N 3°46′47″W	Category C(S)	37073	Upload Photo
28 And 30 Wellgate				55°40′23″N 3°46′45″W	Category C(S)	37077	Upload Photo
34 And 36 Wellgate				55°40′22″N 3°46′45″W	Category B	37079	Upload Photo
42 Wellgate				55°40′22″N 3°46′44″W	Category C(S)	37081	Upload Photo
44-48(Even Numbers Only) Wellgate				55°40′22″N 3°46′44″W	Category B	37082	Upload Photo
28 Wellgate Head				55°40′19″N 3°46′36″W	Category C(S)	37085	Upload Photo
9, 11 And 13 West Port				55°40′26″N 3°47′00″W	Category B	37087	Upload Photo
20 West Port				55°40′28″N 3°47′01″W	Category C(S)	37092	Upload Photo
New Lanark, New Lanark Road, K6 Telephone Kiosk				55°39′50″N 3°46′53″W	Category B	37104	Upload another image
19, 21 And 23 High Street				55°40′25″N 3°46′47″W	Category C(S)	36986	Upload Photo
18 And 20 High Street				55°40′24″N 3°46′45″W	Category C(S)	36999	Upload Photo
25 Hope Street				55°40′31″N 3°46′54″W	Category B	37010	Upload Photo
Hope Bank 18 Hope Street				55°40′29″N 3°46′53″W	Category C(S)	37014	Upload Photo
Hyndford Road, Gates, Gatepiers And Railings At Auction Room And Cattle Market				55°40′14″N 3°46′05″W	Category A	37024	Upload Photo
2Nd Auction Room And Hyndford Road Auction Market				55°40′16″N 3°46′14″W	Category C(S)	37025	Upload Photo
Mousemill Road, Clydesholm Bridge				55°40′32″N 3°48′02″W	Category A	37032	Upload another image
1A, Old Bridgend, Kirkfieldbank				55°40′34″N 3°47′59″W	Category C(S)	37033	Upload Photo
New Lanark, 1-8 (Inclusive Nos) Caithness Row And The Counting House				55°39′47″N 3°46′47″W	Category A	37039	Upload Photo
New Lanark, Rosedale Street, 5-12 (Inclusive Nos) Double Row, Known As Water Row				55°39′52″N 3°47′00″W	Category A	37042	Upload Photo
New Lanark, 1-11 (Inclusive Nos) Nursery Buildings				55°39′48″N 3°46′48″W	Category A	37046	Upload Photo
52 Bloomgate				55°40′27″N 3°46′56″W	Category B	36946	Upload Photo
28 And 30 Broomgate				55°40′24″N 3°46′53″W	Category B	36952	Upload Photo
32 Broomgate				55°40′23″N 3°46′54″W	Category B	36953	Upload Photo
38 Broomgate				55°40′23″N 3°46′54″W	Category B	36955	Upload Photo
40 Broomgate				55°40′23″N 3°46′55″W	Category C(S)	36956	Upload Photo
53 And 55 Castlegate				55°40′21″N 3°46′53″W	Category C(S)	36970	Upload Photo
7, 9 And 13 High Street				55°40′25″N 3°46′48″W	Category C(S)	36984	Upload Photo
Cartland Bridge				55°40′50″N 3°48′03″W	Category B	13054	Upload Photo
Orchard Dell, Now Sorisdale				55°40′44″N 3°48′05″W	Category B	13063	Upload Photo
86 Mousebank Road, Ridge Park Home Including Walled Garden And Conservatory				55°40′51″N 3°47′12″W	Category B	13066	Upload Photo
Bonnington Linn, Footbridge				55°38′47″N 3°46′31″W	Category B	46900	Upload Photo
Falls Of Clyde, Stonebyres Power Station With Tank And Pipes				55°40′38″N 3°49′48″W	Category A	51719	Upload Photo
7 North Vennel				55°40′28″N 3°46′57″W	Category C(S)	37057	Upload Photo
Lanark Memorial Hall, St Leonard Street				55°40′28″N 3°46′31″W	Category B	37061	Upload Photo
St Mary's Presbytery St Vincent Place				55°40′20″N 3°46′22″W	Category A	37066	Upload Photo
13, 15 And 17 Wellgate Head				55°40′20″N 3°46′36″W	Category C(S)	37084	Upload Photo
35 And 37 West Port				55°40′27″N 3°47′02″W	Category C(S)	37088	Upload Photo
Eu Church West Port				55°40′27″N 3°47′04″W	Category C(S)	37089	Upload Photo
22 West Port				55°40′28″N 3°47′02″W	Category C(S)	37093	Upload Photo
Wheatpark Cottage, 5 Wheatpark Road				55°40′35″N 3°47′00″W	Category B	37098	Upload Photo
Smyllum Park, Whitelees Road				55°40′24″N 3°45′40″W	Category B	37101	Upload Photo
43 And 45 High Street D W Brown And Son				55°40′25″N 3°46′44″W	Category C(S)	36992	Upload Photo
14 And 16 High Street				55°40′24″N 3°46′46″W	Category B	36998	Upload Photo
13 Hope Street Mervyn				55°40′29″N 3°46′55″W	Category C(S)	37006	Upload Photo
6 Market End				55°40′23″N 3°46′52″W	Category C(S)	37031	Upload Photo
New Lanark Road, Braxfield House				55°40′08″N 3°47′20″W	Category B	37035	Upload Photo
New Lanark, Community Hall (Former New Lanark Church) With Gatepiers, Railings And Boundary Walls				55°39′52″N 3°46′54″W	Category A	37037	Upload another image
12, 14, 16 Bloomgate				55°40′26″N 3°46′51″W	Category C(S)	36939	Upload Photo
30 And 32 Bloomgate				55°40′26″N 3°46′53″W	Category B	36941	Upload Photo
42 Bloomgate				55°40′26″N 3°46′54″W	Category C(S)	36943	Upload Photo
48 Bloomgate				55°40′27″N 3°46′56″W	Category C(S)	36945	Upload Photo
Castlepark Lodge Broomgate				55°40′18″N 3°47′00″W	Category B	36958	Upload Photo
9 & 11 Castlegate				55°40′24″N 3°46′49″W	Category C(S)	36965	Upload Photo
38 Castlegate				55°40′21″N 3°46′55″W	Category B	36969	Upload Photo
101 Castlegate				55°40′15″N 3°47′01″W	Category B	36975	Upload Photo
Former Tollhouse, 201 Hyndford Road				55°39′52″N 3°44′56″W	Category B	13469	Upload Photo
The Lee, South Lodge				55°40′50″N 3°48′20″W	Category B	13058	Upload Photo
Mousemill House				55°40′40″N 3°47′59″W	Category C(S)	13062	Upload another image
64, 66 Hall Road, Nemphlar				55°40′47″N 3°49′19″W	Category B	13068	Upload Photo
New Lanark, Visitor Centre (Formerly New Institution For The Formation Of Character And Engine House)				55°39′48″N 3°46′51″W	Category A	37049	Upload another image
New Lanark, Mill No 3				55°39′48″N 3°46′55″W	Category A	37053	Upload Photo
New Lanark, Former Mechanics' Workshop				55°39′42″N 3°46′48″W	Category A	37054	Upload another image
11 North Vennel				55°40′28″N 3°46′57″W	Category C(S)	37059	Upload Photo
39 Wellgate				55°40′23″N 3°46′43″W	Category B	37069	Upload Photo
32 Wellgate				55°40′23″N 3°46′45″W	Category C(S)	37078	Upload Photo
50 Wellgate				55°40′22″N 3°46′43″W	Category B	37083	Upload Photo
28 West Port				55°40′28″N 3°47′02″W	Category C(S)	37095	Upload Photo
Gatepiers, 52 Wheatpark Road				55°40′31″N 3°47′09″W	Category B	37100	Upload Photo
Chapel, Smyllum Park, Whitelees Road				55°40′24″N 3°45′41″W	Category B	37102	Upload Photo
Institute Smyllum Park, Whitelees Road				55°40′25″N 3°45′37″W	Category B	37103	Upload Photo
51 High Street				55°40′25″N 3°46′43″W	Category C(S)	36994	Upload Photo
The Portvaults Public House 116 High Street				55°40′25″N 3°46′33″W	Category C(S)	37001	Upload Photo
20 Hope Street				55°40′29″N 3°46′53″W	Category B	37015	Upload Photo
Hyndford Road Auction Room Cattle Market				55°40′15″N 3°46′09″W	Category B	37023	Upload Photo
New Lanark, 5 And 7 Rosedale Street, David Dale's House				55°39′51″N 3°46′56″W	Category A	37048	Upload another image
Ymca Bloomgate				55°40′26″N 3°46′57″W	Category B	36935	Upload Photo
8 And 10 Bloomgate				55°40′26″N 3°46′50″W	Category B	36938	Upload Photo
5 Broomgate				55°40′25″N 3°46′51″W	Category C(S)	36948	Upload Photo
Wampherflatt Braxfield Road				55°40′15″N 3°46′38″W	Category B	36960	Upload Photo
Hyndford Bridge				55°39′16″N 3°43′35″W	Category A	13055	Upload another image
The Lee				55°41′55″N 3°49′29″W	Category B	13056	Upload Photo
Baronald (Cartland Bridge Hotel)				55°40′55″N 3°47′35″W	Category A	12967	Upload Photo
Bonnington Mains				55°39′31″N 3°45′47″W	Category B	51427	Upload Photo
Mansefield House, West Port				55°40′30″N 3°47′02″W	Category B	37096	Upload Photo
7 Hope Street				55°40′27″N 3°46′55″W	Category C(S)	37004	Upload Photo
Hope Street Former Council Chambers Clerk's Office And Sheriff Court				55°40′30″N 3°46′52″W	Category B	37016	Upload another image
Hope Street Christ Church Episcopal Church				55°40′32″N 3°46′51″W	Category B	37018	Upload Photo
Hyndford House 5 Hyndford Place				55°40′24″N 3°46′51″W	Category B	37020	Upload Photo
5 And 7 Hyndford Road				55°40′19″N 3°46′30″W	Category B	37022	Upload Photo
1 New Lanark Road				55°39′58″N 3°46′31″W	Category B	37034	Upload Photo
New Lanark, Rosedale Street, 1- 4 (Inclusive Nos) Double Row, Also Known As Wee Row				55°39′51″N 3°46′58″W	Category A	37041	Upload another image
Clydesdale Hotel 13 & 15 Bloomgate				55°40′25″N 3°46′53″W	Category B	36933	Upload Photo
Castle Park 80 Broomgate				55°40′19″N 3°47′02″W	Category B	36959	Upload Photo
54 Castlegate				55°40′19″N 3°46′57″W	Category C(S)	36972	Upload Photo
13 Friars Lane, Friarsview, Including Boundary Walls				55°40′22″N 3°47′00″W	Category C(S)	36980	Upload Photo
15 And 17 High Street Wrights				55°40′26″N 3°46′47″W	Category C(S)	36985	Upload Photo
Hyndford Road, Lanark Racecourse, Tote Tower				55°39′53″N 3°44′47″W	Category B	46519	Upload Photo
New Lanark Road, Braxfield House, Walled Garden				55°40′00″N 3°47′25″W	Category C(S)	51429	Upload Photo
Falls Of Clyde, Stonebyres Power Station Weir And Bridge				55°40′34″N 3°49′20″W	Category A	51720	Upload Photo
Falls Of Clyde, Bonnington Power Station Weir And Bridge				55°40′34″N 3°49′20″W	Category A	51728	Upload Photo
New Lanark, Retort House Chimney				55°39′40″N 3°46′50″W	Category A	37056	Upload another image
1 Wellgate				55°40′24″N 3°46′47″W	Category B	37067	Upload Photo
41, 43 And 45 Wellgate				55°40′22″N 3°46′43″W	Category C(S)	37070	Upload Photo
2 West Port				55°40′27″N 3°46′58″W	Category B	37091	Upload Photo
31 High Street				55°40′25″N 3°46′46″W	Category C(S)	36988	Upload Photo
37 And 39 High Street				55°40′25″N 3°46′45″W	Category C(S)	36990	Upload Photo
Hope Street St Kentigern's Church (Church Of Scotland)				55°40′29″N 3°46′55″W	Category B	37007	Upload Photo
Crown Tavern 17 Hope Street				55°40′30″N 3°46′55″W	Category C(S)	37008	Upload Photo
Linsay Institute, Hope Street				55°40′28″N 3°46′54″W	Category B	37013	Upload Photo
12-22 (Even Nos) Lockhart Drive, Former William Smellie Memorial Hospital				55°40′39″N 3°47′27″W	Category B	37030	Upload Photo
The Royal Oak Tree Bannatyne Street				55°40′25″N 3°46′26″W	Category C(S)	36928	Upload Photo
7 Bloomgate And 2 Broomgate				55°40′25″N 3°46′52″W	Category C(S)	36932	Upload Photo
Cairns Church Of Scotland Bloomgate				55°40′26″N 3°46′57″W	Category B	36936	Upload Photo
18 And 20 Bloomgate				55°40′26″N 3°46′52″W	Category C(S)	36940	Upload Photo
36 Bloomgate				55°40′26″N 3°46′54″W	Category C(S)	36942	Upload Photo
44 And 46 Bloomgate				55°40′27″N 3°46′56″W	Category B	36944	Upload Photo
7 Broomgate				55°40′24″N 3°46′51″W	Category C(S)	36949	Upload Photo
34 And 36 Broomgate				55°40′23″N 3°46′54″W	Category B	36954	Upload Photo
Castlegate, Lodge To Castlebank Park Including Boundary Walls, Gatepiers And Gates				55°40′15″N 3°47′04″W	Category C(S)	36976	Upload Photo
Ryber Lodge, Cleghorn Road				55°40′45″N 3°46′42″W	Category C(S)	36979	Upload Photo
The Lee, Dovecote				55°41′49″N 3°49′30″W	Category B	13057	Upload Photo
Holmfoot				55°42′01″N 3°51′53″W	Category B	13059	Upload Photo
The Roman Bridge				55°40′41″N 3°47′58″W	Category B	13061	Upload Photo
Hyndford Road At A70, Winston Barracks, Officers' Mess				55°39′48″N 3°43′47″W	Category C(S)	46981	Upload Photo
New Lanark Road, Braxfield House, Dairy				55°40′08″N 3°47′17″W	Category C(S)	51428	Upload Photo
Falls Of Clyde, Bonnington Power Station With Tank And Pipes				55°39′13″N 3°46′25″W	Category A	51727	Upload Photo
New Lanark, Weir, Tunnel And Lade				55°39′33″N 3°46′48″W	Category A	44552	Upload Photo
9 North Vennel				55°40′28″N 3°46′57″W	Category C(S)	37058	Upload Photo
3 And 5 Wellgate				55°40′24″N 3°46′46″W	Category B	37068	Upload Photo
Wheatpark, Wheatpark Road				55°40′34″N 3°47′03″W	Category B	37097	Upload Photo
41 High Street				55°40′25″N 3°46′45″W	Category C(S)	36991	Upload Photo
61 High Street				55°40′25″N 3°46′42″W	Category C(S)	36996	Upload Photo
Royal Bank Of Scotland 88 High Street				55°40′24″N 3°46′37″W	Category C(S)	37000	Upload Photo
Crosslaw House, Home Street				55°40′11″N 3°45′42″W	Category B	37002	Upload Photo
5 Hope Street				55°40′27″N 3°46′55″W	Category C(S)	37003	Upload Photo
11 Hope Street				55°40′28″N 3°46′55″W	Category B	37005	Upload Photo
Hope Street Former County Police Station				55°40′31″N 3°46′51″W	Category B	37017	Upload Photo
7-13 Hyndford Place (Odd Numbers Only)				55°40′24″N 3°46′51″W	Category C(S)	37021	Upload Photo
Lanark Grammar School, Hyndford Road				55°40′17″N 3°46′31″W	Category B	37027	Upload Photo
Railway Station, Bannatyne Street, Lanark, Including Platform Shelter				55°40′25″N 3°46′23″W	Category B	36930	Upload Photo
Bank Of Scotland 21 Bloomgate				55°40′26″N 3°46′55″W	Category C(S)	36934	Upload Photo
54 Bloomgate				55°40′27″N 3°46′57″W	Category B	36947	Upload Photo
Castlebank House, Including Stable Court Range				55°40′16″N 3°47′17″W	Category B	36961	Upload Photo
Castlebar 32 & 34 Castlegate				55°40′21″N 3°46′55″W	Category C(S)	36967	Upload Photo
57 And 57A Castlegate				55°40′21″N 3°46′53″W	Category C(S)	36971	Upload Photo
Greenside, Cleghorn Road, Lanark				55°40′35″N 3°46′48″W	Category B	36978	Upload Photo
Mousemill Bridge				55°40′41″N 3°48′00″W	Category B	13060	Upload Photo
Hyndford Road At A70, Winston Barracks, Accommodation Block				55°39′42″N 3°43′49″W	Category B	46978	Upload Photo
Hyndford Road At A70, Winston Barracks, Sergeants' Mess				55°39′40″N 3°43′44″W	Category B	46982	Upload Photo
7 Wellgate				55°40′24″N 3°46′46″W	Category C(S)	49589	Upload Photo
2 New Lanark Road				55°39′58″N 3°46′31″W	Category B	51430	Upload Photo
New Lanark, Mill No 2				55°39′48″N 3°46′56″W	Category A	37052	Upload Photo
12 And 14 Wellgate, Maize's Bar				55°40′24″N 3°46′47″W	Category C(S)	37074	Upload Photo
38 And 40 Wellgate				55°40′22″N 3°46′44″W	Category C(S)	37080	Upload Photo
24 And 26 West Port				55°40′28″N 3°47′02″W	Category C(S)	37094	Upload Photo
Former Lodge To Wheatpark, 52 Wheatpark Road				55°40′32″N 3°47′08″W	Category B	37099	Upload Photo
35 High Street				55°40′25″N 3°46′45″W	Category C(S)	36989	Upload Photo
57 High Street				55°40′26″N 3°46′43″W	Category B	36995	Upload Photo
2-8 High Street				55°40′25″N 3°46′46″W	Category B	36997	Upload another image
21 Hope Street, Lanark, Including Boundary Walls And Railings				55°40′30″N 3°46′54″W	Category C(S)	37009	Upload Photo
35 Hope Street, Lanark, Including Outbuilding And Boundary Walls				55°40′33″N 3°46′53″W	Category B	37011	Upload Photo
Muirglen, Hyndford Road				55°40′13″N 3°45′50″W	Category C(S)	37026	Upload Photo
St Kentigern's Church, Hyndford Road				55°40′12″N 3°46′11″W	Category B	37028	Upload Photo
New Lanark, 1 And 3 Rosedale Street, Robert Owen's House				55°39′50″N 3°46′54″W	Category A	37047	Upload another image
The Caledonian Hotel Banatyne Street				55°40′23″N 3°46′25″W	Category C(S)	36929	Upload Photo
1, 3 And 5 Bloomgate				55°40′25″N 3°46′51″W	Category C(S)	36931	Upload Photo
9 Broomgate				55°40′23″N 3°46′52″W	Category C(S)	36950	Upload Photo
Broomgate House, 42 And 44 Broomgate				55°40′22″N 3°46′55″W	Category B	36957	Upload Photo
Castlebank House, Garden Terraces				55°40′13″N 3°47′18″W	Category C(S)	36962	Upload Photo
5 & 7 Castlegate				55°40′24″N 3°46′49″W	Category C(S)	36964	Upload Photo
36 Castlegate				55°40′21″N 3°46′55″W	Category C(S)	36968	Upload Photo
68 And 72 Castlegate				55°40′18″N 3°46′58″W	Category C(S)	36974	Upload Photo
1 High Street				55°40′25″N 3°46′49″W	Category C(S)	36982	Upload Photo
3 High Street, The Cross Cafe				55°40′25″N 3°46′49″W	Category C(S)	36983	Upload Photo
Jerviswood				55°41′25″N 3°46′38″W	Category A	13053	Upload Photo
Mouse Mill				55°40′42″N 3°48′05″W	Category B	13064	Upload Photo
Corra Linn, Bonnington Pavilion				55°39′14″N 3°46′26″W	Category A	13065	Upload Photo
Mousebank Road, Ridge Park Lodge And Gatepiers				55°40′49″N 3°47′15″W	Category C(S)	13067	Upload Photo
Baronald Estate (Cartland Bridge Hotel), Lodge				55°40′49″N 3°47′43″W	Category B	12968	Upload Photo
Hyndford Road At A70, Winston Barracks, Guardhouse And Museum, Including Gates, Gatepiers And Railings				55°39′41″N 3°43′56″W	Category C(S)	46979	Upload Photo

== Key ==
The scheme for classifying buildings in Scotland is:

- Category A: "buildings of national or international importance, either architectural or historic; or fine, little-altered examples of some particular period, style or building type."
- Category B: "buildings of regional or more than local importance; or major examples of some particular period, style or building type, which may have been altered."
- Category C: "buildings of local importance; lesser examples of any period, style, or building type, as originally constructed or moderately altered; and simple traditional buildings which group well with other listed buildings."

In March 2016 there were 47,288 listed buildings in Scotland. Of these, 8% were Category A, and 50% were Category B, with the remaining 42% being Category C.
