= Lanark Tolbooth =

Judicial building in Lanark, Scotland

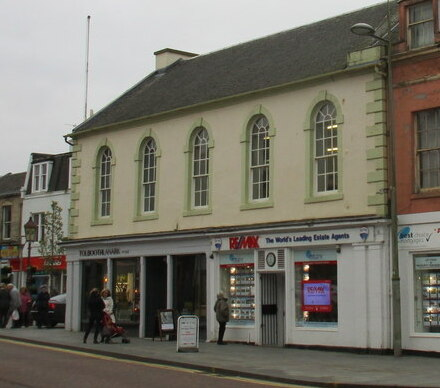
- Lanark Tolbooth

- Shown in South Lanarkshire
- 55.6735°N 3.7795°W
- Location: High Street, Lanark

History
- Built: 1778

Site notes
- Architectural style: Neoclassical style

Listed Building – Category B
- Official name: 2–8 High Street
- Designated: 12 January 1971
- Reference no.: LB36997

Lanark Tolbooth is a municipal building in Hope Street, Lanark, South Lanarkshire, Scotland. The building, which now operates as an arts and heritage centre, is a Category B listed building.

== History ==
The original venue for the administration of justice and the conduct of municipal affairs in the town was Lanark Castle, which William Wallace destroyed in the 13th century. An early tolbooth was operating in the High Street at least as far back as the early 15th century. There were prison cells on the ground floor and a courtroom was established for municipal and judicial meetings on the first floor. However, by 1571, it was in a ruinous condition and had to be rebuilt.

On 30 November 1649, a group of eleven alleged witches were imprisoned in the tolbooth and subjected to pricking by the witch-pricker, George Cathie, to seek out the mark of the devil. A Presbyterian Covenanter, Thomas Lauchlan, who was taken prisoner at the Battle of Bothwell Bridge on 22 June 1679, was incarcerated in the tolbooth, but set free by a group of covenanters who attached the tolbooth on the evening of 15 June 1681, after which it was more heavily guarded. Then, on 23 December 1684, Robert Baillie of Jerviswood, who had been incriminated for his alleged involvement in the Rye House Plot, was brought up before the High Court on the charge of treason. He was pronounced guilty the next day and hanged the same afternoon at the Mercat Cross at Edinburgh. His body was quartered and displayed on the roofs of the tolbooths at Lanark, Jedburgh, Ayr and Glasgow; a young boy, William Leechman, subsequently took down the remains from the Lanark Tolbooth and properly interred them. A separate, more secure, prison building was erected to the west of the tolbooth in 1714.

The present structure was designed in the neoclassical style, built in brick with a stucco finish and was completed in 1778. The design involved a symmetrical main frontage of five bays facing north onto the High Street. There were shop fronts on the ground floor and round headed windows with architraves, imposts and keystones on the first floor, and there were rusticated quoins at the corners. The east end, which was fenestrated with sash windows on the ground floor and round headed windows on the first floor, featured a blind oculus in the gable above. There was a carving of a double headed eagle in the recess between the windows, recalling the double headed eagle in the Lanark coat of arms.

By the 1830s, the tolbooth was dilapidated and it was decided to commission new public buildings in Hope Street and the burgh council relocated to that location in 1836. The tolbooth was subsequently abandoned and eventually sold for commercial use. It was then used as a printers' office, as an auction house and then as a grocers' shop. After the burgh council was abolished in 1975, the provost's lamp, which had historically been placed outside the house of the provost as one of their marks of office, was relocated to the pavement just to the east of the tolbooth on a permanent basis.

In 1992, the tolbooth was acquired jointly by Clydesdale District Council and Lanark Community Council and placed in the ownership of a trust for preservation as a heritage centre. In 2017, the ground floor was remodelled to create an art gallery so allowing the building to operate as a combined arts and heritage centre. The works were carried out to a design by a local architect, Peter Magnus, and financed by Border Biscuits and the Levenseat Trust.

== See also ==
- List of listed buildings in Lanark, South Lanarkshire
