= Queen of Scots Stakes =

Flat horse race in Britain

Queen of Scots Stakes
2026
Circe	Magic Basma	Golden Palace

Previous years
2025
Jabaara	Arolla	Fiery Lucy
2024
Jabaara	Pinafore	Soprano
2023
White Moonlight	Heredia	Lady Onyx
2022
Snooze N You Lose	Improvised	Clitheroe
2021
Just Beautiful	Jouska	Huboor

2020–2017
2020
Mubtasimah	Miss Celestial	Sunday Star
2019
Indian Blessing	Wisdom Mind	Red Starlight
2018
Pepita	Maggies Angel	Paco's Angel
2017
Unforgetable Filly	Pirouette	Glitter Girl

The Queen of Scots Stakes is a Listed flat horse race in Great Britain open to mares and fillies aged three years or older. It is run at Musselburgh over a distance of 7 furlongs and 15 yards (1,422 metres), and it is scheduled to take place each year in June. The race was introduced as a new Listed race in 2017 and the inaugural running was sponsored by Edinburgh Gin. From 2019 to 2021 it was sponsored by Stobo Castle.

From 2017 to 2021 the race was titled the Maggie Dickson Stakes in honour of Maggie Dickson (aka Half-Hangit Maggie), who was born in Musselburgh around 1702 and who became a local celebrity for surviving her execution.

== Records ==
Most successful horse (2 wins):

- Jabaara– 2024, 2025

Leading jockey (2 wins):

- Silvestre de Sousa – Jabaara (2024, 2025)

Leading trainer (2 wins):

- Roger Varian – Jabaara (2024, 2025)
- Richard Hannon Jr. - Pepita (2018), Circe (2026)

== Winners ==
Year	Winner	Age	Jockey	Trainer	Time
2017	Unforgetable Filly	3	Josephine Gordon	Hugo Palmer	1:26.93
2018	Pepita	4	Phillip Makin	Richard Hannon Jr.	1:29.83
2019	Indian Blessing	5	Gerald Mosse	Ed Walker	1:30.61
2020 (Note: The 2020 race was run at Newbury due to the COVID-19 pandemic in the United Kingdom)	Mubtasimah	4	James Doyle	William Haggas	1:22.55
2021	Just Beautiful	3	Joey Haynes	Ivan Furtado	1:25.20
2022	Snooze N You Lose	3	Sam James	Karl Burke	1:26.74
2023	White Moonlight	6	Louis Steward	Saeed bin Suroor	1:26.46
2024	Jabaara	3	Silvestre De Sousa	Roger Varian	1:27.34
2025	Jabaara	4	Silvestre De Sousa	Roger Varian	1:26.54
2026	Circe	5	Callum Rodriguez	Richard Hannon Jr.	1:26.90

== See also ==
- Horse racing in Scotland
- List of British flat horse races
