= Lanark Silver Bell =

The Lanark Silver Bell is a horseracing trophy from Lanark, Scotland. It is understood to be one of the oldest sporting trophies in the world.

== History ==
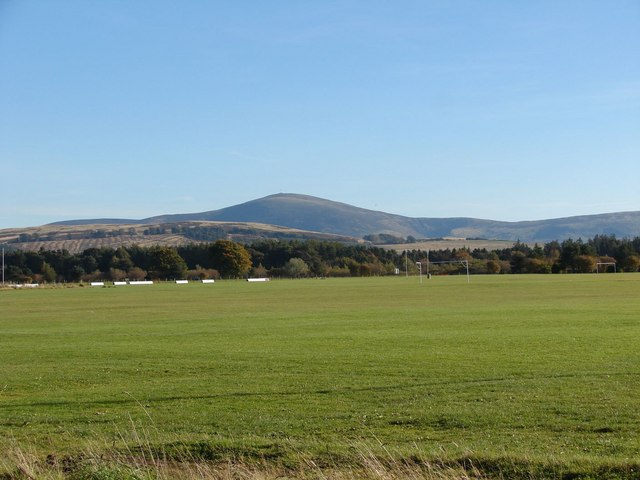
Tinto from Lanark Racecourse.

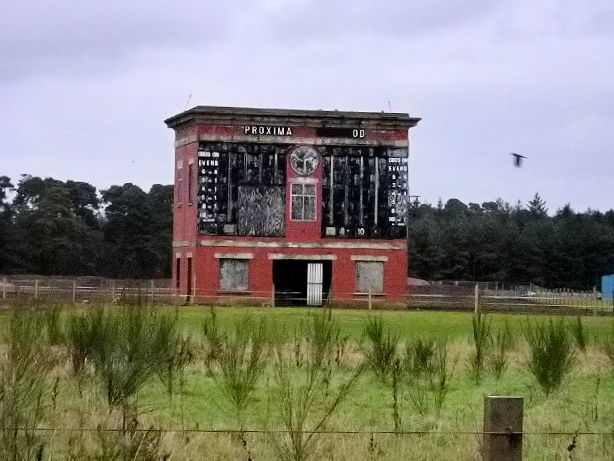
The disused Lanark Racecourse in 2006.

The silver bell has traditionally been described as a gift of William the Lion, to the royal burgh of Lanark, in 1160. King William often resided at Lanark Castle, taking part in local hunts and watching racing on the moors.

However, the various hallmarks on the bell, by members of the Incorporation of Goldsmiths in Edinburgh, date from the late 16th and early 17th centuries. The Compendium of Scottish Silver states the date of the cup to be circa 1617, and the makers to be Hugh Lindsay and Deacon Robert Dennistoun.

The last Silver Bell race to be run at Lanark Racecourse was in 1977. The series started again in 2008 at the Hamilton Park Racecourse. The original bell is presumed to no longer exist, but the present one dates from the 17th century.
