= Horse racing in Scotland =

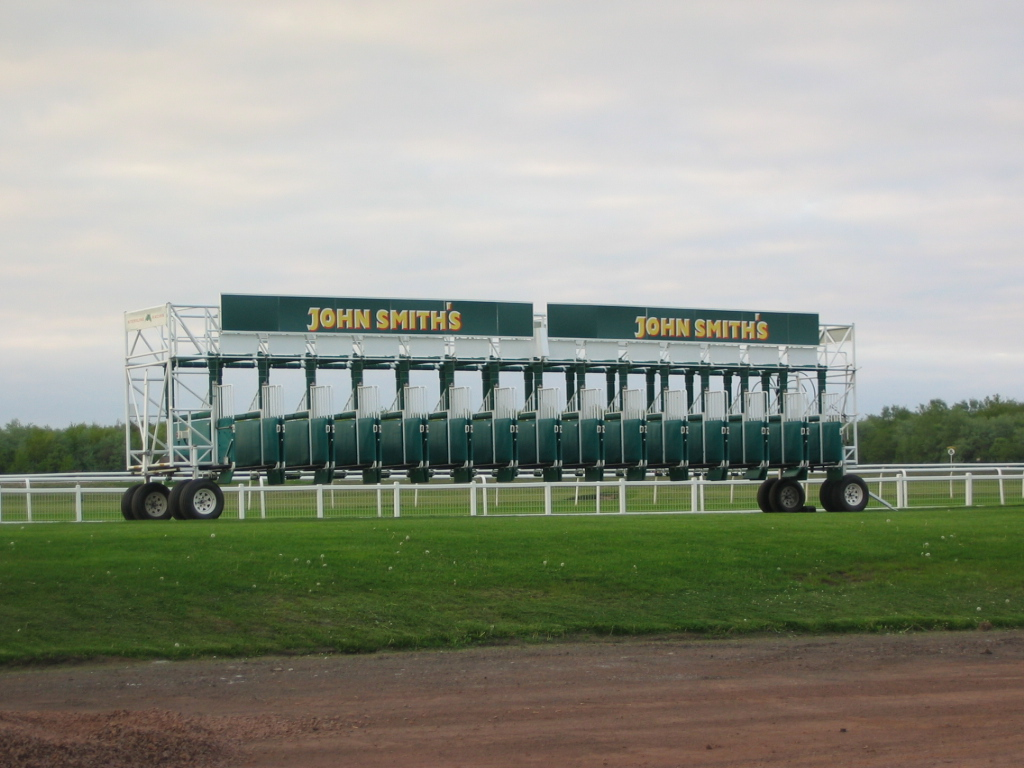
Starting stalls at Musselburgh Racecourse

Horseracing in Scotland is a popular spectator sport, with a history dating back over 900 years. There are currently five operating racecourses in Scotland - one exclusively for flat racing, two exclusively for jump racing and two mixed. Between them they held one hundred and three race meetings in 2014. The main National Hunt meeting held is the Scottish Grand National meeting at Ayr each April, and the main Flat meeting is the Ayr Gold Cup Festival (historically known as the Western Meeting), at the same course each September.

Horseracing first flourished in the country during the reign of King James VI and I when members of the Royal Court developed a passion for the sport, before they began to establish a centre for horse racing in Newmarket. From that time onwards, in contrast to England, wealthy owners have been rare in Scotland, and the main development of the sport took place south of the border. The contributions of Scots owners such as the fourth Duke of Queensberry were made in England.

In the modern era, horse racing in Scotland comes under a British, as opposed to a specifically Scottish aegis. Scottish race meetings tend to have a strong local feeling, local runners and local patronage.

== History ==
Racing horses for sport in Scotland dates back at least 900 years. The Lanark Silver Bell, reputedly first contested in the reign of William the Lion of Scotland in the 12th or early 13th century is among the first horse races recorded anywhere. In fact, until 1977, when Lanark Racecourse closed, it was the oldest continually run horse racing event in the world. After a break of 30 years it was revived at Hamilton in 2008.

Among other early records of racing are those in the Lord Treasurer's Accounts, the records of King James IV's personal expenditure. There are only four references to horse racing, all in 1503-4, including a payment made in 1504 to a jockey, ‘the boy that ran the King’s horse’ at Leith. Relative to James' other sporting interests such as falconry and golf this is very few.

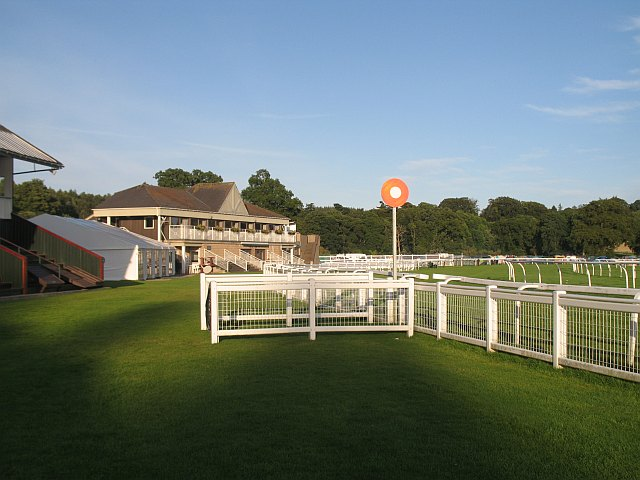
Winning post at Perth Racecourse

A well-known annual race, with a bell for a prize, was instituted at Haddington in 1552, but reference to this in royal records is restricted to a single entry. It is not until the reign of James VI that racing truly emerges. Races were held at Peebles and Dumfries (from 1575) but it was not until he saw the possibilities of racing on Newmarket Heath in 1605 he became an enthusiast for horse racing. Although the sport went into abeyance during the Civil War and the Interregnum, the sport bounced back after the Restoration. From then on, racing took place all over Scotland, more intensively in the Lowlands than in the Highlands and has continued down to the present day.

In 1800, annual race meetings were held at five places in Scotland, and by 1816, the year the main races in Edinburgh moved from Leith to Musselburgh, nine places. In 1839, there were still nine.

== Racecourses ==
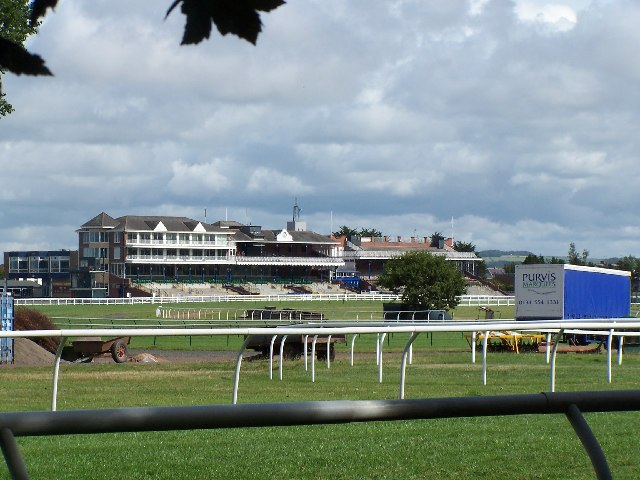
The Eglinton stands at Ayr Racecourse

The five racecourses in Scotland are:

- Ayr Racecourse in Ayrshire - (mixed)
- Hamilton Park in South Lanarkshire - (flat)
- Kelso Racecourse in the Scottish Borders - (national hunt)
- Musselburgh Racecourse (formerly officially known as Edinburgh Racecourse) in East Lothian - (mixed; was flat only until 1987)
- Perth Racecourse in Perth and Kinross - (national hunt)

In living memory, there were also Lanark Racecourse (closed 1977; flat only) and Bogside Racecourse (closed 1965; mixed, and the traditional home of the Scottish Grand National).

== Bibliography ==
- Burnett, John (1998). "The Sites and Landscapes of Horse Racing in Scotland Before 1860" (PDF). The Sports Historian. 18 (1). The British Society of Sports History: 55–75. doi:10.1080/17460269809444769. Archived from the original (PDF) on 28 April 2014.
- Grant, James (1880). Cassell's Old and New Edinburgh: Its History, its People and its Places. Vol. VI. London, Paris and New York: Cassell, Petter, Galpin & Co.
- Mortimer, Roger; Onslow, Richard; Willett, Peter (1978). Biographical Encyclopaedia of British Racing. London: Macdonald and Jane's. ISBN 0-354-08536-0.
- Whyte, James Christie (1840). History of the British Turf, from the earliest period to the present day, Volume I. London: H. Colburn. OL 6544990M.
