= The Royal Caledonian Hunt =

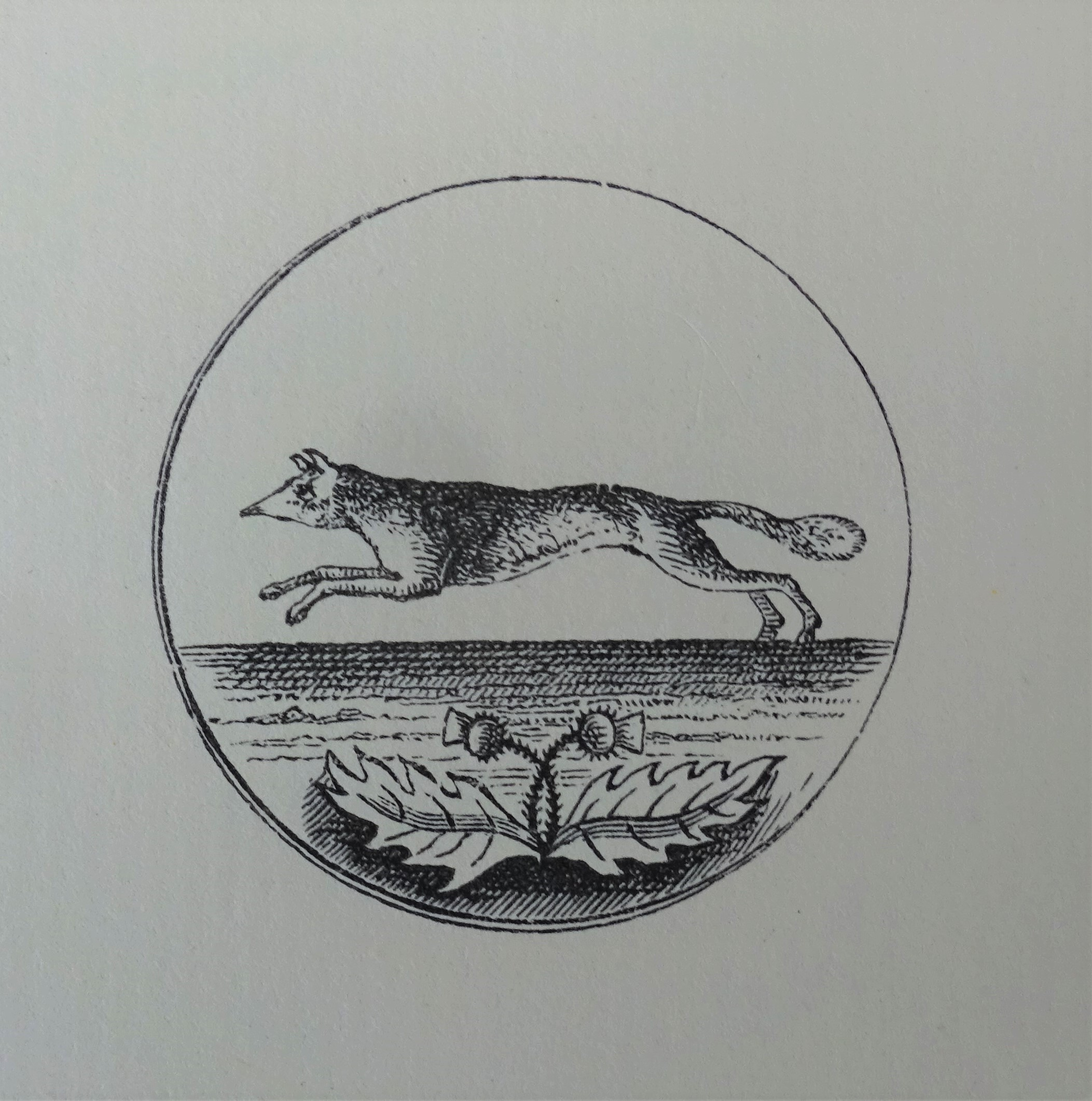
The Royal Caledonian Hunt emblem

The Royal Caledonian Hunt is a Scottish racing club dating back to 1777.

== Background ==
The club was officially instituted on 2 August 1777 in Hamilton as 'the Hunters Club'. The following year the club took the name 'The Caledonian Hunt Club'. The Duke of Hamilton was to be the President of the Club and the Countess Eglinton was to be the Patron. As the name implied the club was originally constituted to hunt, with the first fortnight long meeting set to take place at Haddington on 12 October 1778. However, it seemed that the club was also concerned from the beginning with horse racing. One year after it was instituted the club held races at Musselburgh. Two years after it was instituted the Caledonian Hunt club sponsored its first race at the Racecourse in Kelso. So it was, that the club met twice a year at Kelso, using the Cross Keys Hotel as their meeting point. Over time the frequency of their meets increased, in both Edinburgh and elsewhere. A Hunt Ball was held, a notable example of which was the ball of 1787, for which the Edinburgh Assembly Rooms were opened for the first time. In 1786 a Yorkshire Colonel visited the club and remarked:

A charming scene of confusion; cooks, ladies' servants, waitresses all running against each other, being the time of Kelso Races. The company is composed of gentlemen of the Turf on both sides of the Tweed with families and friends and also members of the Caledonian Hunt. Foxhounds and harriers hunt alternately in the mornings. There is also a concert and races and next night the gentlemen of the Hunt give a handsome ball. After the ladies retired therefrom, the gentlemen formed a party to drink their healths and when I got up at 8 they were still drinking and meant to sit till hounds went out. This meeting, I heard, is most expensive of any. An English Steward was obliged to pay 10 guineas for his room, though only there 5 nights.

— Colonel Thornton

Although the club became based in Edinburgh, the location of its race meetings varied each year, with Kelso playing host most often. Although the club had a choice of 8 different courses in Scotland, they only chose Aberdeen once.

== Robbie Burns ==
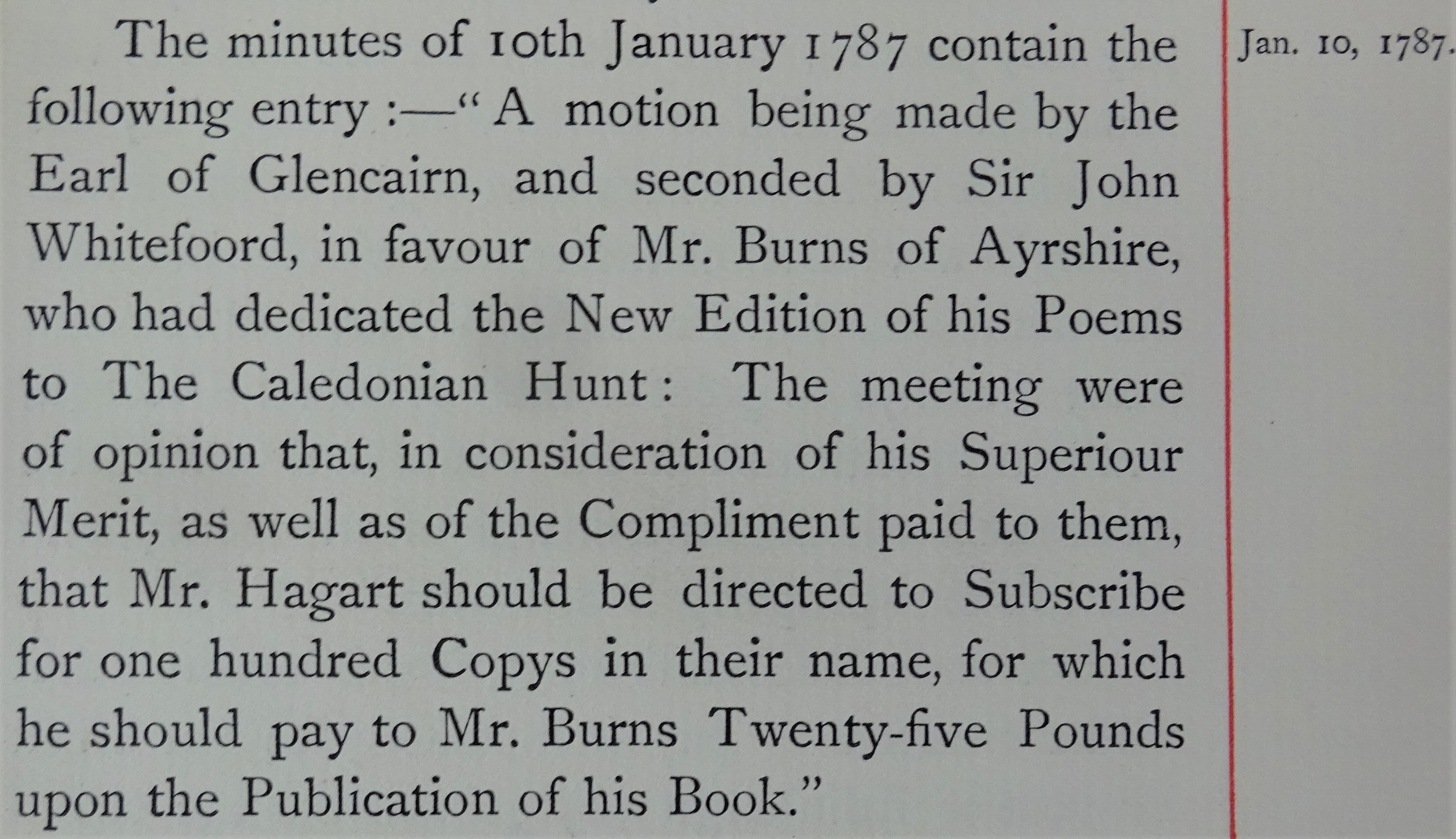
Extract from the club minutes of 10 January 1787

Around 1787 Robbie Burns met with members of the Caledonia Hunt Club, having befriended a number of members around Edinburgh. Burns dedicated the first Edinburgh Edition of his Poems to the Hunt. To return the favour the treasurer of the Caledonia Hunt Club was instructed to "subscribe for one hundred copies in their name, for which he should pay Mr Burns £25, upon the publication of his book." By 1792 Burns was himself a member of the Caledonia Hunt Club, however his name does not appear the official published list of members or honorary members. A portrait of Robbie Burns was given to the club by the famous engraver William Walker. The print is now property of the British museum.

== Royal patronage ==
In 1822 as part of his visit to Edinburgh King George IV attended the Caledonian Hunt Club's annual ball. He was so struck with the meeting that he agreed to be the patron of the club, permitting them to use the title 'Royal'. Nathaniel Gow provided the music for the event, but refused to charge the club, having been so pleased by the response of the King to his music.

Since the patronage of 1822, several other monarchs and royals have been involved with the club, including William IV, Queen Victoria and Prince Albert, and Edward VII.

== Inspired art ==
In addition to Robbie Burns, the Royal Caledonia Hunt Club seems to have inspired the works of other artists. For example, The Caledonian Hunt, by Sir Alexander Don in 1780 and the Royal Caledonian Hunt's Delight, written by Mr James Miller in 1792 (later given words by Robbie Burns); and North's (Milles Macphail) Farewell to the Caledonian Hunt published as part of the Gow collection.

== Present activities ==
The club continues to meet. Their AGM and annual dinner is hosted at The New Club in Edinburgh. The current patron of the club is Prince Edward, Duke of Kent.

== See also ==
- Tarporley Hunt Club
