= Tarporley Hunt Club =

Fox hunting club in England

The Tarporley Hunt Club is a hunt club which meets at Tarporley in Cheshire, England. Founded in 1762, it is the oldest surviving such society in England. Its members' exploits were immortalised in the Hunting Songs of Rowland Egerton-Warburton. The club also organised the Tarporley Races, a horse racing meeting, from 1776 until 1939. The club's patron is HRH The Prince of Wales.

== Foundation and early history ==
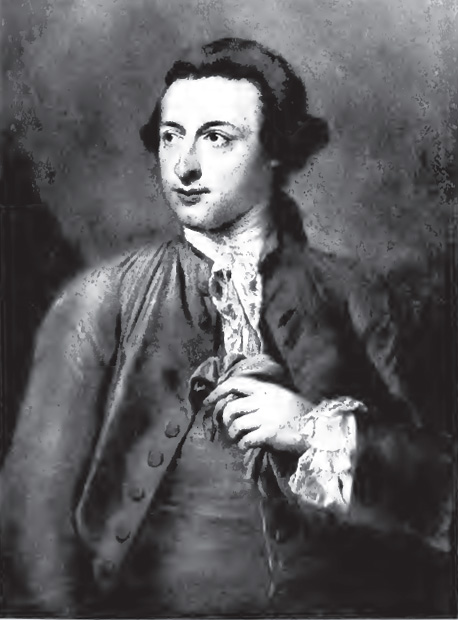
George Wilbraham, one of the club's founders

The club was founded in 1762, pre-dating the Cheshire Hunt by a year. The nine founders included the Reverend Obadiah Lane of Longton, the first president; John Crewe, son of the Rector of Barthomley, and the Honourable Booth Grey, son of the fourth Earl of Stamford, the first secretaries; Robert Salusbury Cotton, son of Sir Lynch Salusbury Cotton, of Combermere Abbey; and George Wilbraham of Nantwich, later of Delamere Lodge. The first hunt was held on 14 November 1762.

The club met twice annually at Tarporley, with each meeting lasting seven days, and the hunting in the early years largely taking place within Delamere Forest. At first the club organised hare coursing, but its focus had already begun to switch to fox hunting within the first few years. Membership was limited to twenty in 1764, expanded to twenty-five in 1769 and later to forty. The club's headquarters soon became the Swan Hotel, which dates from 1769. In the founding set of rules, members were required to drink "three collar bumpers" after both dinner and supper, and, in the event of marriage, to present each club member with a pair of buckskin breeches.

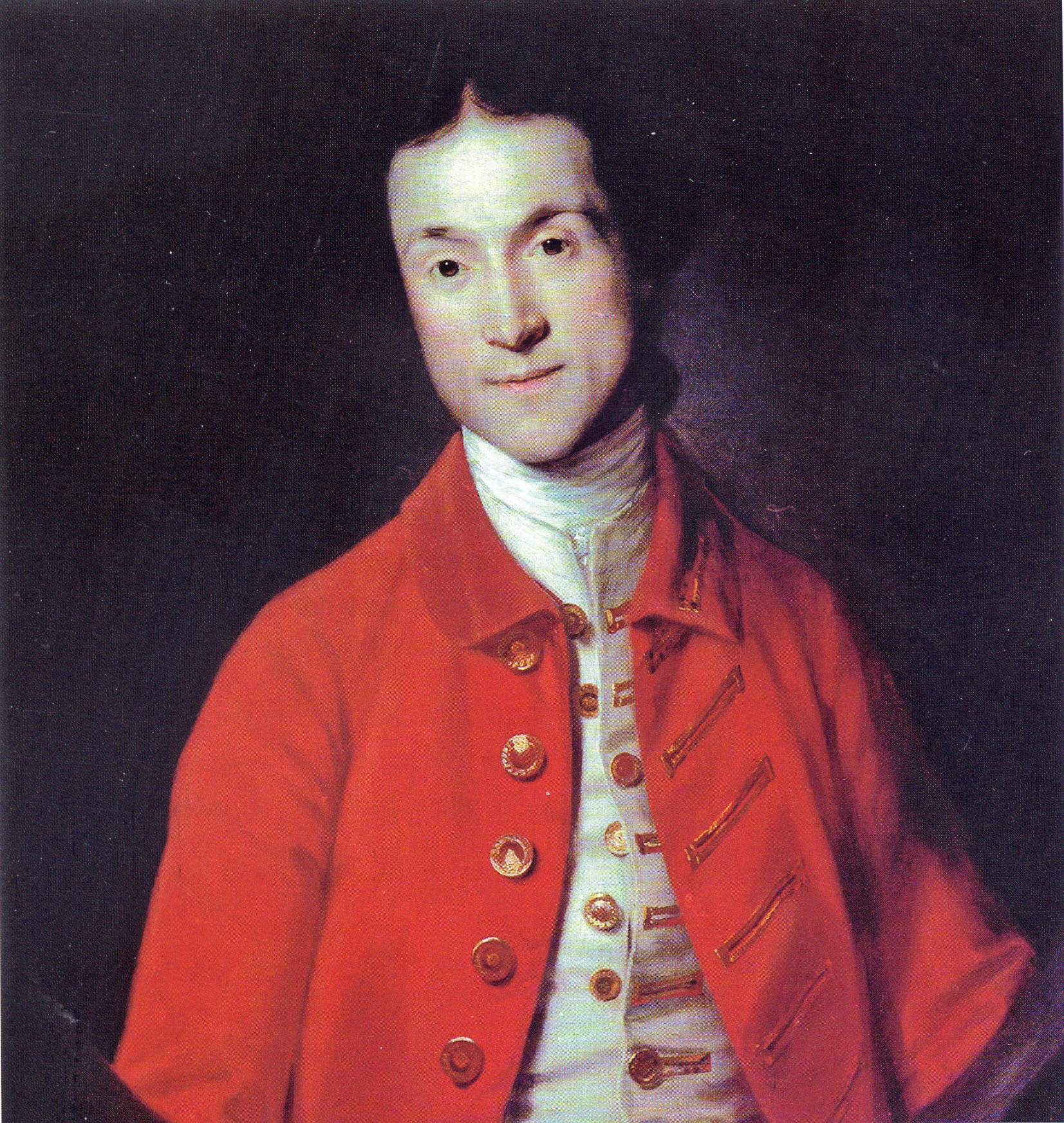
Lord Grosvenor was among the early members

The original hunting costume was specified as "a blue frock, with plain yellow metalled buttons, scarlet velvet cape, and double-breasted scarlet flannel waistcoat, the coat sleeve to be cut and turned up" and was strictly enforced with fines of a guinea per infraction. This changed in 1770 to a red coat, green velvet cape and green waistcoat, and modern club members are distinguished by their green collars.

The club used the first pack of foxhounds in Cheshire, whose master was John Smith-Barry, son of the fourth Earl of Barrymore, of Marbury Hall. Among the hounds was the famed Blue Cap, which had beaten the hound owned by Hugo Meynell, founder of the Quorn Hunt, in a race held in 1762. The first known idiomatic use of the phrase "to send to Coventry" appears in the club book entry for 4 November 1765 relating to Barry:

Mr. John Barry having sent the Fox Hounds to a different place to what was ordered, and not meeting them himself at that place, was sent to Coventry, but return'd upon giving six bottles of Claret to the Hunt.

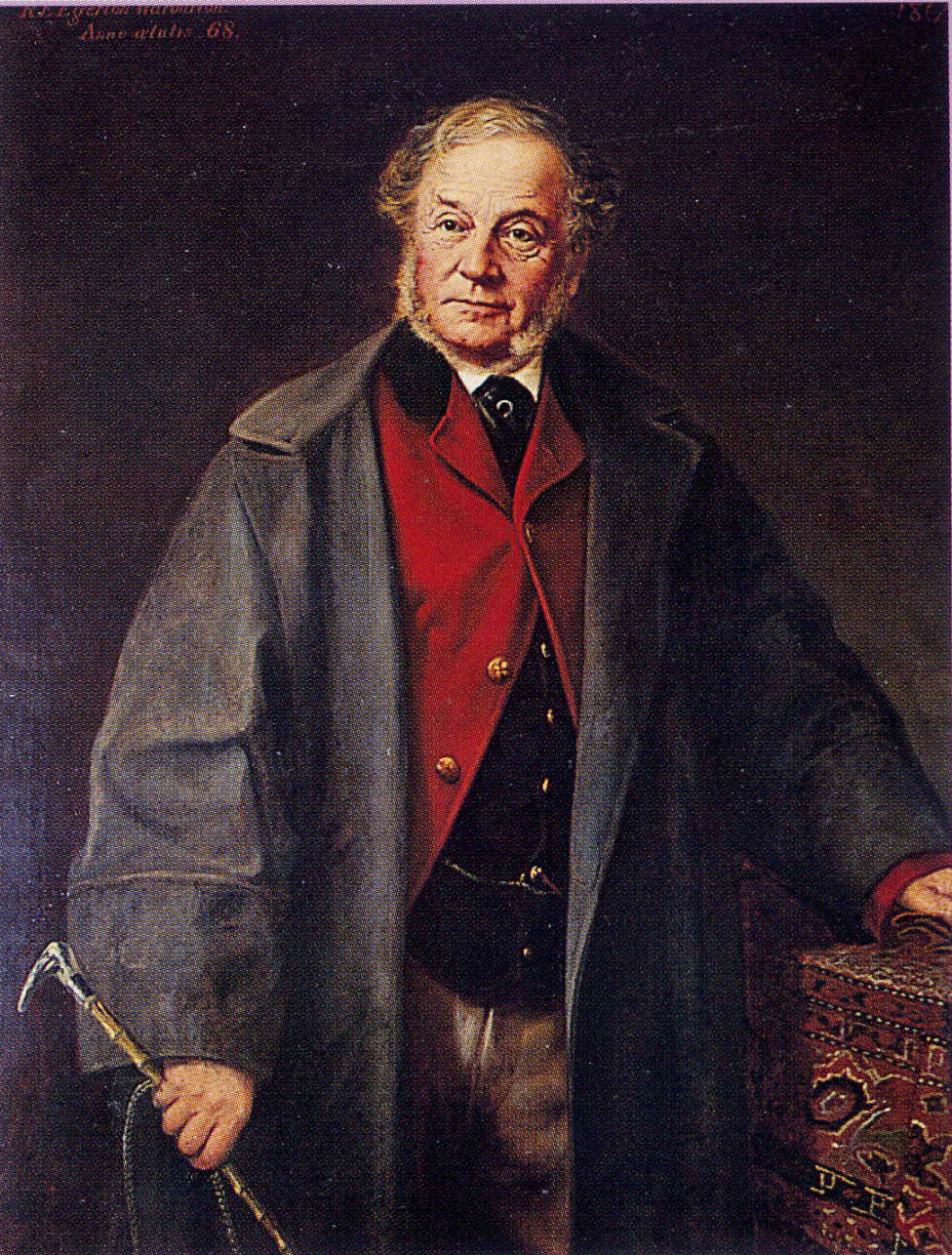
Rowland Egerton-Warburton, dubbed the club's poet laureate

After Barry's death in 1784, the hunt used a pack kept by Sir Peter Warburton of Arley Hall, which later became known as the Cheshire Hounds.

Members of the Egerton, Cholmondeley, Grosvenor and other prominent local families joined not long after the club's foundation. Among the many early members who were important in county or national affairs were Sir Philip Egerton of Oulton Park; Richard Grosvenor, first Earl Grosvenor, of Eaton Hall; Field Marshal Stapleton Cotton, first Viscount Combermere, of Combermere Abbey; Thomas Cholmondeley of Vale Royal; and his son, also Thomas Cholmondeley, first Baron Delamere. Rowland Egerton-Warburton, president in 1838 and later one of the club's few honorary members, was known as the club's poet laureate. He immortalised some of its members' exploits in his Hunting Songs, and also wrote a history of the club to accompany an edition of the verses.

== Horse races ==
George Wilbraham, one of the club's original founders, purchased an estate in Delamere Forest including Crabtree Green, which had been used as racecourse since the mid-17th century. In 1776, the club held a sweepstake there with seven runners, and the contest became an annual event. In 1809, the Tarporley Races became a permanent fixture in the Racing Calendar. Originally, only horses owned or nominated by members could enter, but in 1805 or 1809, a silver cup was awarded for a "farmers' race".

After the enclosure of Delamere Forest in 1812, the races moved first to Billington's Training Ground, near Oulton, and then a few years later to Cotebrook, on a course by the modern A49 rented from Lord Shrewsbury. The races were originally flat; a hurdle race was introduced in 1848, but discontinued in 1856. In 1875, the race meeting, by then held in April and known as the "Tarporley Hunt Steeplechase", moved to Saighton Farm, near Tarporley.

In 1877, the location again moved to the Arderne Estate on the outskirts of Tarporley, where a permanent steeplechase course was later constructed. The event became very popular with spectators in the late 19th and early 20th century, who arrived by a special train. The members' race was ridden in hunting costume. Racing was interrupted by the First World War, and did not resume until 1921. In 1926, the club formed a limited company, Tarporley Steeplechases, to run the meetings. The event attracted 10,000 spectators in 1937, but the races stopped after 1939 and never resumed; Tarporley Steeplechases was wound up in 1963.

== Modern club ==
The club still meets twice a year at the Swan, though it now largely takes the form of a social club or dining society. It sponsors a cup at the Bangor-on-Dee races. HRH The Prince of Wales has been the patron of the club since 1980.

== See also ==
- The Royal Caledonian Hunt
