= Delamere Park =

Housing estate in Cheshire, England

Coordinates: 53°14′41″N 2°37′09″W

- Delamere Park Logo
- Interactive map of Delamere Park
- Address: Chester; England
- Location: Cuddington
- Capacity: 427 houses
- Type: Private housing estate

Construction
- Opened: 1971
- Years active: 1971-

Website
- www.delamerepark.co.uk

Delamere Park is an English housing estate with parkland situated in Cuddington, near Northwich, Cheshire.

== General history ==
Delamere Park estate is situated on land which once was part of the Wilbraham family estate. The Wilbraham family owned the manor there from 1784 to 1939. In 1784 the extremely wealthy and powerful Wilbrahams moved the family seat from Nantwich to Cuddington building in the process one of the largest houses in the district, Delamere Lodge. It is believed that George Wilbraham, the head of the family, favoured Cuddington because it was in the midst of excellent hunting country and close to Tarporley where he was a founder member of the Tarporley Hunt Club.

Delamere Lodge (later retitled Delamere House), with its 100-acre (0.40 km^{2}) parkland, was built of Devon granite and became a symbol of the almost baronial power in the district of the Wilbrahams. During almost two centuries the family owned and controlled thousands of acres of land and farms around Cuddington and neighbouring villages. They also employed a veritable army of staff and built numerous workers' cottages and farmhouses, most of which survive to this day. Delamere House survived until just before the Second World War when the last George Wilbraham built Delamere Manor nearby. During the late 1990s to mid-2000s Delamere Manor was occupied by the British pop musician Gary Barlow.

During World War II, Delamere Park became an army transit camp providing accommodation not only for British soldiers but also for thousands of Americans who had arrived in preparation for the forthcoming D-Day landings on June 6, 1944. General George Patton even visited 'Camp Delamere' and gave a speech to the American 3rd Army troops. After the war, the army huts used to accommodate the soldiers were transformed into houses for the use of many local residents awaiting council houses from Northwich Rural District Council. These included people who were relatives of serving Polish soldiers. The presence of local people housed in temporary accommodation in what was a green belt area enabled the development of the current housing estate to take place.

The estate as it currently exists was built during the 1970s, on the initiative of Tom Baron, a director of Whelmar Limited. Delamere Park was voted North West's Best Development of the 1970s by the National House Building Council.

== Delamere Camp ==
The modern day appearance of Delamere Park is far removed from its past setting as one of the largest displaced persons camps in the North West of England. Delamere House itself and its surrounding parkland had been deserted for nearly a year when in 1939 the Second World War broke when Hitler's troops invaded Poland. In Britain as part of the war effort huge areas of land from several country estates were requisitioned by the War Office in order to build airfields and army camps necessary for the war effort. By 1941 Delamere Park was transformed into a vast army camp consisting of Laing and Nissen huts which housed around 15,000 American troops.

With the end of the war the MOD were faced with a new problem, that of Polish forces that fought alongside the British throughout the war, not only to free Poland but also Europe from Nazi domination. The Yalta Conference did not give Poland its freedom, on the contrary Poland now found itself under communist control. The Polish forces felt betrayed and unwilling to go back to communist-dominated Poland. The now disused camps found a new lease of life as accommodation for the Polish troops and their families.

Under the Polish Resettlement Act the first Polish troops arrived at Delamere from Italy in the summer of 1946. They were General Anders' 2 Corps Command Group. Little is known of them apart from that throughout the campaign, through Persia, the Middle East and Italy the 2 Corps artillery supply mascot was Wojtek an orphaned baby bear. Although Wojtek did not come to Delamere camp, many of the soldiers arriving there knew him and had stories about him. Wojtek's story can be found in books and on the internet.

Over the next few months the camp was filling up with women and children. Many families were reunited after years of separation arriving with no more than the clothes on their backs and a few meagre possessions. The huts had to be shared by several families so, to have some privacy, they were partitioned off with army Blankets. All sanitary facilities were shared in central ablution blocks

Although Delamere was classified as a Polish Displaced Persons' camp, it was not run by the National Assistance Board. When the MOD left, the camp came under the jurisdiction of the local authority and with the shortage of houses it also became home to bombed out British families.

Later on, the Ministry of Housing and the Local Authority modernised the huts into two bedroom accommodation with a sitting room, kitchen, running water and bathroom so the living conditions for the Poles improved. The two communities co-existed side by side with little integration between them. Devoted to their culture, language and religious ideals the Poles kept themselves to themselves carrying on with their deep-rooted traditions.

== Today ==
The Park currently 427 households, a mixture of mostly, 3-4 bedroom houses and bungalows, together with an associated exclusive clubhouse, swimming pool, squash and tennis courts. It also has a wide range of community groups.

In March 2004 a fire destroyed the leisure club building, which was then redesigned and reopened some two years later. In March, 2007, and in common with other areas of the former Vale Royal District, several plaques were erected in Delamere Park illustrating the area's history.

== Book ==
On the 13 June 2007 it was announced that CC Publishing were preparing to publish a book chronicling the Park's detailed history; focusing mainly on its time as a World War II army base and its subsequent accommodation for Polish military families were unable to return to their homeland. The book was released in 2008 co-authored by A.D.Coxhead and R.M.Bevan
