= Send to Coventry =

Deliberately ostracise someone (English idiom)

"Send to Coventry" is an idiom used in England meaning to deliberately ostracise someone. Typically, this is done by not talking to them, avoiding their company, and acting as if they no longer exist. Coventry is a historical cathedral city in the West Midlands county.

== Origin ==
The origins of this phrase are unknown, although it is quite probable that events in Coventry in the English Civil War in the 1640s play a part. One hypothesis as to its origin is based upon The History of the Rebellion and Civil Wars in England, by Edward Hyde, 1st Earl of Clarendon. In this work, Clarendon recalls how Royalist troops that were captured in Birmingham were taken as prisoners to Coventry, which was a Parliamentarian stronghold. These troops were often not received warmly by the locals.

An early example of the idiom is from the Club book of the Tarporley Hunt (1765):

Mr. John Barry having sent the Fox Hounds to a different place to what was ordered was sent to Coventry, but return'd upon giving six bottles of Claret to the Hunt.

By 1811, the meaning of the term was defined in Grose's The Dictionary of the Vulgar Tongue:

To send one to Coventry; a punishment inflicted by officers of the army on such of their brethren as are testy, or have been guilty of improper behaviour, not worthy the cognizance of a court martial. The person sent to Coventry is considered as absent; no one must speak to or answer any question he asks, except relative to duty, under penalty of being also sent to the same place. On a proper submission, the penitent is recalled, and welcomed by the mess, as just returned from a journey to Coventry.

According to William Clark in Tales of the Wars (1836), the phrase originates from a story about a regiment that was stationed in the city of Coventry but was ill-received and denied services.

== Similar non-English idioms ==
A partial French equivalent is limoger (removing or demoting someone from a high position), which is derived from Limoges, the city in central France to which generals deemed incompetent were sent during World War I. A related Polish phrase is pisz na Berdyczów, 'write to Berdychiv', which is a veiled way to tell the other person to stop all contact. It probably comes from the incompetence of the local post office during the 19th century.

== See also ==
- Boycott – Voluntary abstention from using a product or service
- Cancel culture – Modern form of social rejection
- Coventry (short story) – 1940 short story by Robert Heinlein
- Ghosting (behavior) – Stopping all communication with a person
- Ostracism – Democratic procedure for expelling citizens
- Silent treatment – Refusal to communicate with someone who desires communication
- Stealth banning – Blocking a user from an online community without their awareness
- The Angry Silence (1960 film) – 1960 British film by Guy Green, starring Richard Attenborough
