= Musselburgh Racecourse =

Horse racing venue in East Lothian, Scotland

Coordinates: 55°56′49.37″N 3°2′22.18″W

Musselburgh
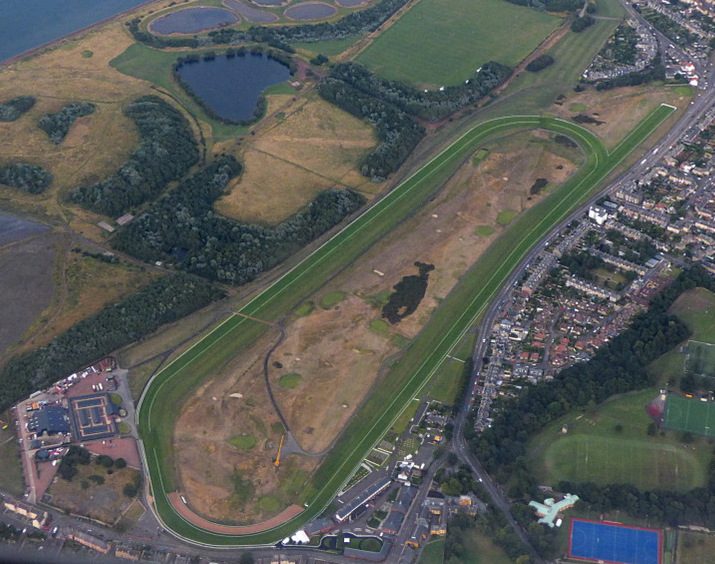
- Aerial view of Musselburgh Racecourse
- Interactive map of Musselburgh
- Location: Musselburgh, East Lothian
- Date opened: 1816
- Screened on: Racing TV
- Course type: Flat; National Hunt
- Notable races: William Hill Scottish Sprint Cup, Royal Mile Handicap

Musselburgh Racecourse is a horse racing venue located in the Millhill area of Musselburgh, East Lothian, Scotland, UK, close to the River Esk. It is the second biggest racecourse in Scotland (the first being Ayr) and is the fourteenth biggest in the UK. In 2016, Musselburgh staged 25 fixtures. It was officially known as "Edinburgh Racecourse", and referred to as such in the English press, until the beginning of 1996 but was widely referred to as "Musselburgh" in Scotland long before that and was widely referred to as Musselburgh in the racing pages of Scottish newspapers.

The course is right-handed, with sharp bends, and offers both flat racing and National Hunt meetings (though it only introduced jumping in 1987), with the flat course being about 1m 2f round, and the jumps course slightly longer. The flat course has a straight course of five furlongs which joins the round course four furlongs from home. There are eight fences on the national hunt course, four in each straight.

In the middle of the course is a nine-hole golf course, Musselburgh Links, dating from at least 1672. The Royal Musselburgh Golf Club was founded there in 1774.

== Location ==
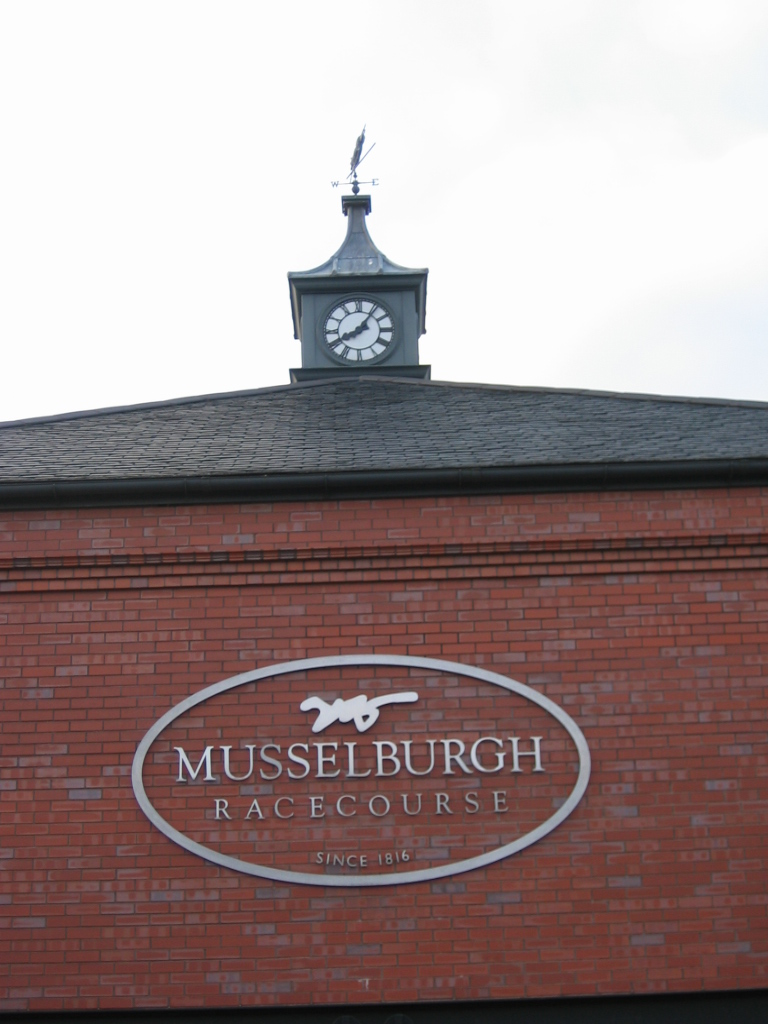
Entrance to Musselburgh Racecourse

The racecourse itself sits on Musselburgh common good land. It is situated on the eastern side of the town, less than a mile from the A1 and two miles from the Edinburgh City Bypass. A road bridge over the Esk gives access to the course on race days only; the rest of the time, the gates are kept closed.

== History ==
The first races in Musselburgh took place in 1777 under the auspices of the Royal Caledonian Hunt. Between 1789 and 1816, race meetings were held on the sands at Leith, although some races did still take place in the town. In 1816, they returned permanently to Musselburgh, to a course that had been laid out for them by the town council. The Hunt were so pleased with the new course that they distributed 50 guineas amongst the town’s poor.

After the legalisation of off course betting shops in 1961, racecourse attendances went into decline. This hit Scotland particularly hard, with Lanark and Bogside racecourses both going bankrupt. By the 1980s Musselburgh looked to be heading the same way, and, despite a temporary financial reprieve in 1987 when racecourses began to sell pictures of races to the betting shops, it was still losing money at the start of the 1990s.

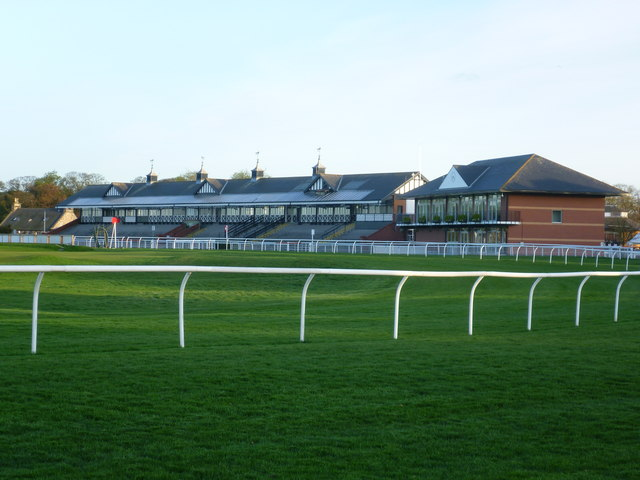
The stands

As a result, in 1991, East Lothian Council took over the running of the racecourse from the Lothians Racing Syndicate Limited (LRS). The Council brought the racecourse to a breakeven position in one year. In 1994, the Council and the Lothians Racing Syndicate created the Musselburgh Joint Racing Committee (MJRC) to run the racecourse, a partnership which still exists today. The Council own the racecourse facilities and assets and the MJRC pay a full commercial rent for use of the land and facilities to both the Common Good Fund and ELC.

From 1995 onwards, a £7.5 million refurbishment plan was put in place. This included a prestigious new hospitality stand (The Queen’s Stand), the refurbishment of the Edwardian Grandstand, the building of the Links Pavilion, a new weighing room and entrance complexes, a new parade ring, new stables and groundstaff facilities, extensive landscaping and improvements to the track itself.

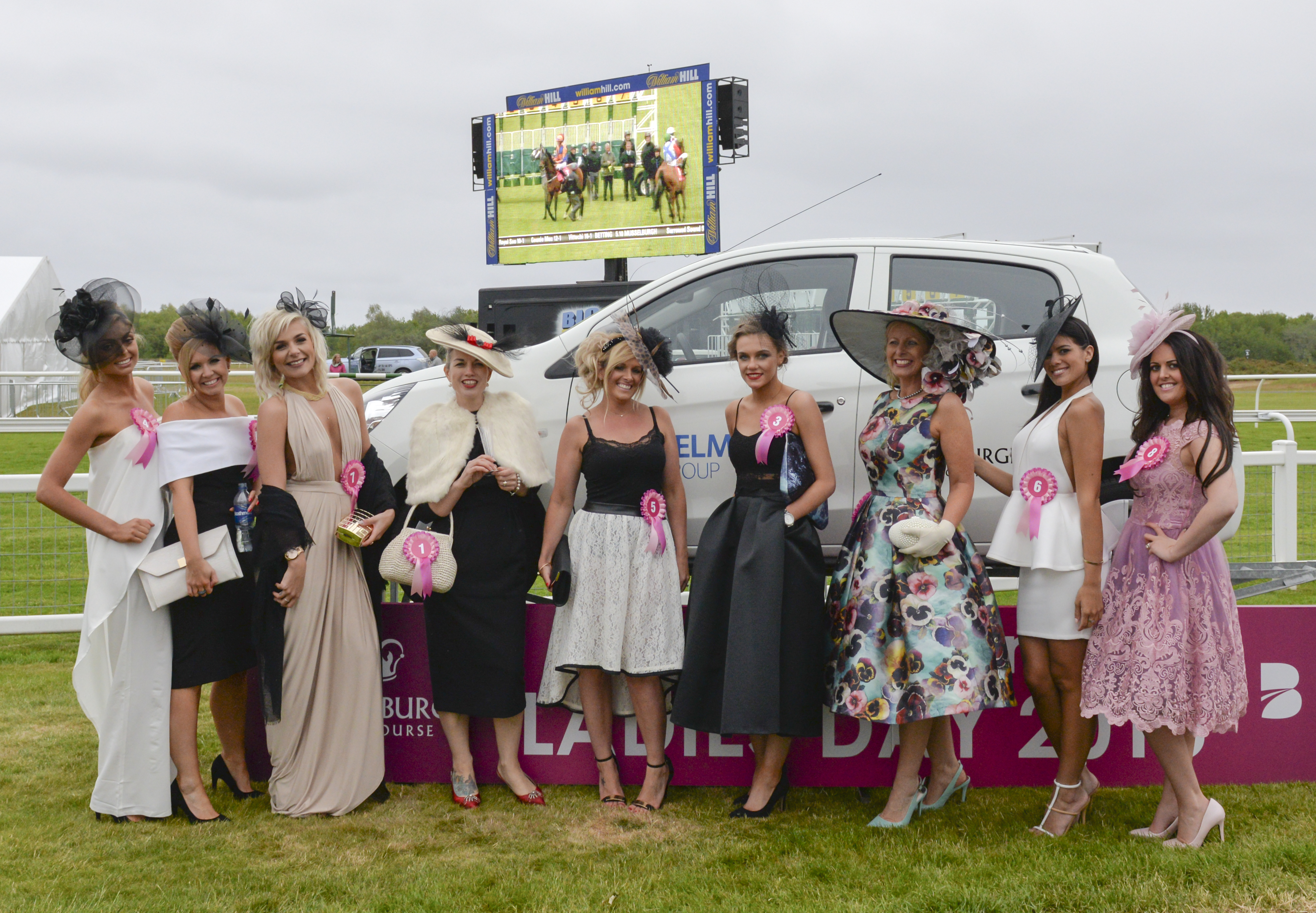
Ladies Day

In 2012 an all weather strip was introduced to the track to prevent the bends being chopped up.

Musselburgh Racecourse is the home of the Corgi Derby. The Corgi Derby is an annual fun dog race held at Musselburgh Racecourse in Scotland, featuring Pembroke Welsh Corgis racing on a miniature track. It was first introduced in 2022 to celebrate Queen Elizabeth II's Platinum Jubilee. The event has since become a regular attraction, drawing international media attention for its playful tribute to the Queen’s favorite dog breed and her love of horse racing.

== Attendances ==
Annual attendance is over 70,000 per annum, up from 38,000 in 1999. Ladies' Day in June is usually the biggest day with sell-out crowds of 8,000. Musselburgh Racecourse hosts six Sensational Racedays annually, which are its main feature events. These include New Year's Day Raceday, the Scottish Cheltenham Trials Weekend, Easter Saturday featuring the Queen's Cup and the Corgi Derby, the Edinburgh Cup, Ladies Day, and Oktoberfest. These events are key highlights in the Scottish racing calendar and attract significant attendance and media coverage.

== Awards ==
In 2011, Musselburgh won the Dual Purpose Award at the Neil Wyatt Racecourse Groundstaff Awards, beating the much bigger Ascot Racecourse into second place. Musselburgh Racecourse have also won a range of awards through the RCA Showcase Awards.In 2023, Musselburgh Racecourse was named the RCA Showcase Racecourse champions.

== Notable races ==
- Goliath Cup Stakes (Listed race), 1 mile 5 furlongs 216 yards
- Queen of Scots Stakes (Listed race), 7 furlongs
- William Hill Scottish Sprint Cup (Class 2 Heritage Handicap), 5 furlongs.
- Royal Mile (Class 2 Handicap), 1 mile.
- Edinburgh Cup (Class 3 Handicap), 1 mile 4 furlongs.
- Queen's Cup (Class 2 Handicap), 1 mile 6 furlongs.
- Edinburgh National (Class 2 Handicap Chase), 4 miles.
