= Lanark Lanimers =

Yearly celebration in Lanark, Scotland

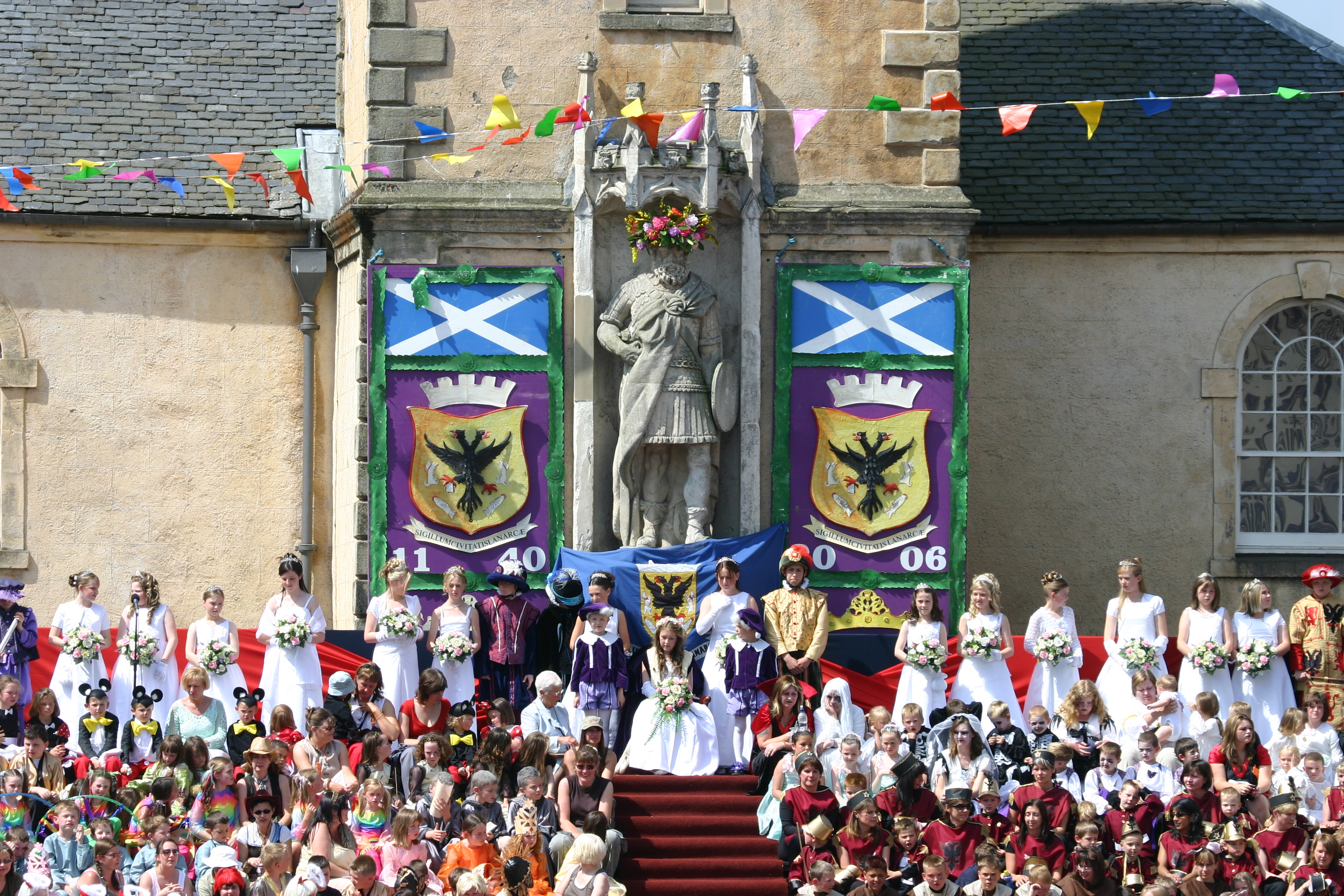
Lanimer Day

Every June the town of Lanark in Scotland celebrates the Lanark Lanimer Celebrations. The festivities reach a high point on the Thursday of Lanimer Week when it’s the gala day, when the town's schoolchildren parade in fancy dress with decorated vehicles, pipe bands, and a Lanimer Queen and her Court, who have been selected from local schools.

The Lanimer celebrations are based on King David I (r. 1124–1153) granting Lanark the status of Royal Burgh during his reign. A condition of the charter stated that the merchants of the town must inspect their March or boundary stones each year. This duty has been carried out every year since then, and the Land Marches became transformed over time into the annual celebrations.

== Events in Lanimer Week ==
Lanimer Week begins on Sunday when the Lord Cornet Elect is led from the town's Memorial Hall to Saint Nicholas' Parish Church for the Kirkin' of the Lord Cornet Elect Service. On the Monday evening, crowds turn out for the Perambulation of the Marches, when officials and members of the public walk the boundaries. A Scottish country dance display takes place at Lanark Cross, followed by the Sashing of the Lord Cornet and the Shifting of the Burgh Standard. The evening ends with the Lord Cornet's Reception. An official ride-out around the town takes place on Tuesday night, followed by the presentation of the New Lanark Loving Cup to the Lanimer Queen Elect at New Lanark. The Lanimer Queen's Reception is held on the Friday evening in the Memorial Hall. Saturday sees the Ball at Lanark Market when the Lord Cornet escorts the Lanimer Queen.

This is not to be confused with Landemer which is a similar festivity held in the nearby town of Rutherglen, also in South Lanarkshire. Landemer is normally held the first Saturday in June.

== Lanimer Day ==
Lanimer Gala Day is held on the Thursday between 6 and 12 June, barring a June election or a pandemic. Schoolchildren and others parade through the town in costumes accompanied decorated lorries. This is known as the Lanimer Queen's Procession. They each receive a Lanimer medal for participating. With the children march brass and pipe bands, Lord Cornet and Ex- Lord Cornet support, and visiting dignitaries. The court ride in cars after the parade, and the Queen has an open-top coach.

Once the procession has gone once around the town centre, the children mount a stand in front of St Nicholas Church (and a statue of William Wallace on the steeple). The court also climb the stand and the Queen is crowned by a local lady, to acclaim from the assembled crowds. "Flower of Scotland" and "Scots Wha Hae" are played, and the Lanimer Queen's Proclamation read out, followed by "God Save the King", the British national anthem.

Later in the afternoon, the Lord Cornet has another procession on horseback. Various entertainments for children and adults are laid on at Castlebank Park, and musical entertainment takes place at the cross in the evening. Finally, children perform at the Lanimer Queen's Reception on the Friday night.
