= Lanark Loch =

Lake in Lanarkshire, Scotland

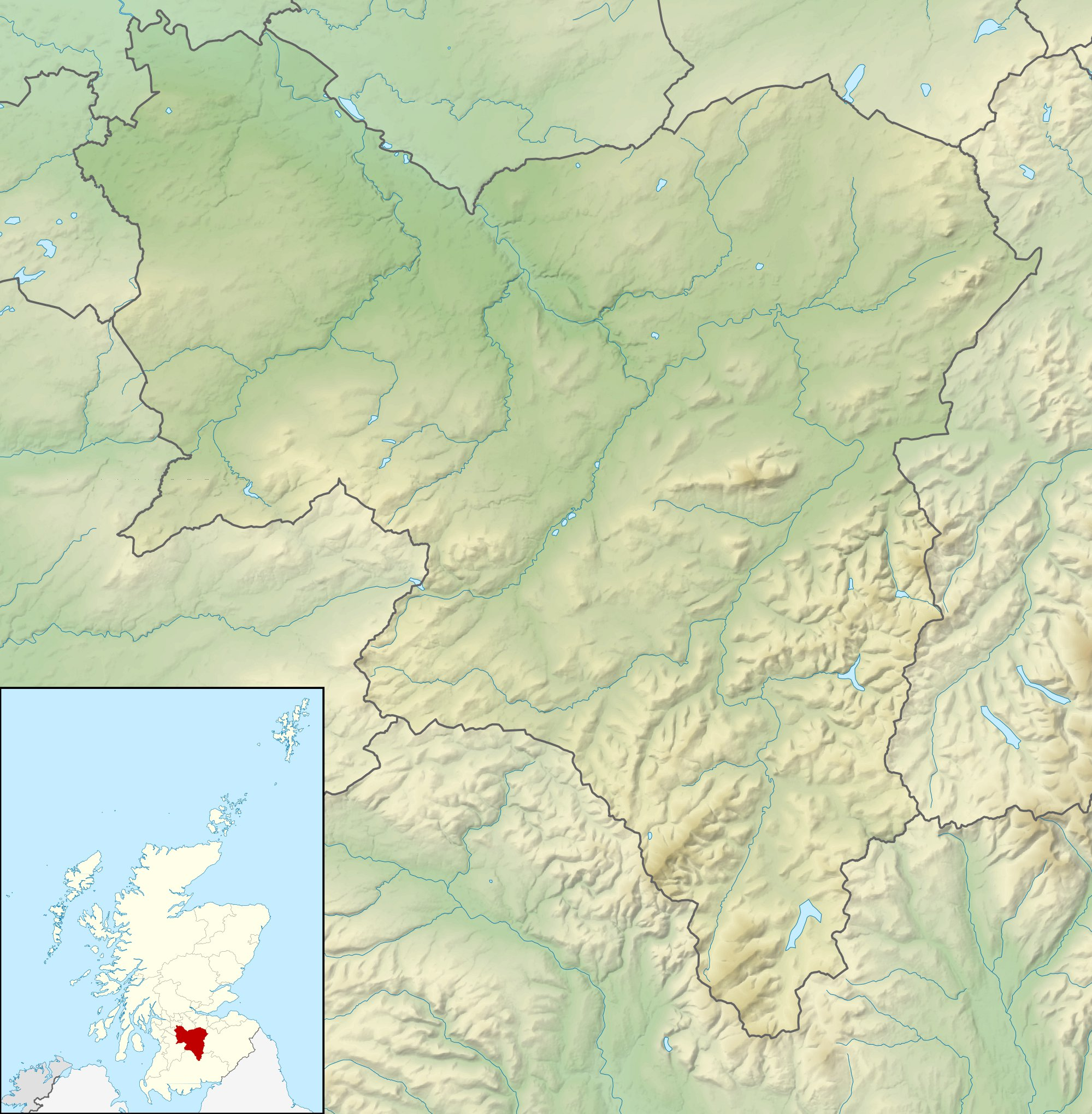
- Location within South Lanarkshire
- Location: East side of Lanark, South Lanarkshire
- Coordinates: 55.6687°N 3.7505°W
- Type: Man-made lake
- Basin countries: Scotland, United Kingdom
- Max. length: 1,440 feet (440 m)
- Max. width: 735 feet (224 m)
- Islands: 2
- Settlements: Lanark

Lanark Loch is a man-made loch in the town of Lanark, South Lanarkshire, situated 2 kilometres (1.2 miles) south east of Lanark town centre. Covering an area of 4.9 hectares (12 acres), it was built in the 19th century by the architect Hugh Marr at a place where there was a small pond which had previously been used by a local curling club. There is a small wooded island in the loch.

== History ==
The creation of Lanark Loch had been necessary because as the population of Lanark grew its water supplies which had been taken from local wells was inadequate. The site at the Muir at Whitelees, where there had been a spring-fed marsh which had been extended to form a curling pond, was seen as suitable for the creation of a reservoir. The loch, also known as Marr's Loch, increased the drinking water supply for Lanark and its environs until 1881 when it was replaced as the main water supply for the town by Loch Lyoch on Tinto. At this point, Lanark Loch and its surrounding area were returned to public use as an amenity.

== Facilities ==
Facilities on the site include a pitch-and-putt course, children's play facilities and fishing. The Inn on the Loch sits on the north-east bank of the loch and is a long established business, providing limited accommodation as well as a café and restaurant.

== Fishing ==
Lanark Loch is known for its coarse fishing and the loch has been stocked with mirror carp. The population of these fish was all but wiped out in the mid-1980s when the loch was accidentally drained by park staff. The loch was then restocked with carp by the Scottish Carp Group. Other fish present in the loch include tench, roach, perch and pike. A catch and release policy is in operation and permits have to be obtained.
