= Whuppity Scoorie =

Scottish festival

- Observed by: Inhabitants of Lanark, Scotland
- Type: Cultural tradition
- Celebrations: Run around a church, gifts (coins), storytelling
- Begins: 1 March
- Ends: 7 March
- Frequency: Annual

Whuppity Scoorie is a traditional festival dating from the early 19th century observed by people in Lanark, Scotland, on 1 March to celebrate the approach of spring. Local children gather around the local St Nicholas kirk where at 6 pm the wee bell is rung. This is the starting sign for the children to run around the church in a clockwise direction, making noise and swinging paper balls on strings above their heads as they run. It is no longer a race for safety reasons and to increase fairness for the younger participants. After three laps, they scramble for coins thrown by members of the Community Council who host the event. The Community Council also hosts a "Whuppity Scoorie Storytelling Festival" and art workshops after the event until 7 March.

== Origins ==
While the origins of Whuppity Scoorie are unknown, there are several theories which try to explain how the ancient custom evolved. The most common theory is that Whuppity Scoorie came from a festival that was intended to celebrate spring and frighten off winter or evil spirits. Others believe it marks the time when days got longer allowing curfews to be lifted or changed so children could play outside longer. Another theory connects the event with an ancient religious penance in which the penitents were whipped three times round the church and afterwards "scoored" – washed – in the nearby River Clyde, but the burgh and kirk session records make no mention of such punishments. The celebration could also have been instituted to remember the murder of William Wallace's wife.

The tradition was first mentioned in a local newspaper, The Hamilton Advertiser, around the mid-19th century. It was still called the "wee bell ceremony" suggesting a link with the ringing of the church bell. In 1893, the Advertiser first referred to "the custom known as Whuppity Scoorie" which simply became "Whuppity Scoorie" the next year. The three laps around the church were also first mentioned in 1893, although the writer claimed this custom was 120 years old by then. The Advertiser also reported on how the local boys in those days rolled up their caps and tied them with string. After the bell rang, they would march to New Lanark where they would fight the boys coming in the opposite direction. By 1880, it was not uncommon for stones to be thrown, so the police posted men along the road between the villages to keep order.
