= Hamilton Park Racecourse =

Horse racing venue in Scotland

Coordinates: 55°47′14″N 4°2′53″W

Hamilton Park
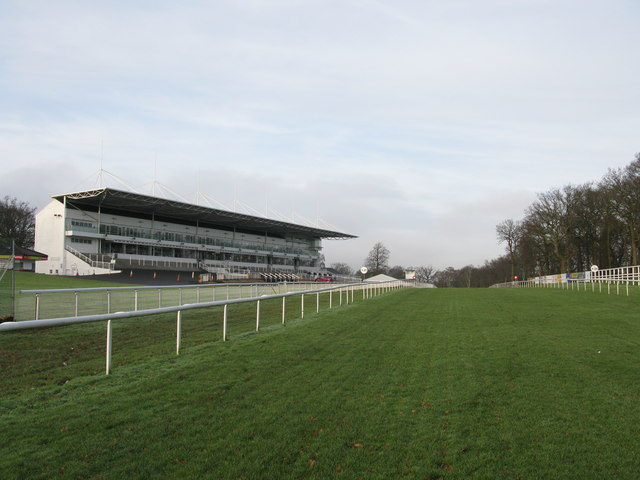
- The home straight and stands
- Interactive map of Hamilton Park
- Location: Hamilton, Scotland
- Owned by: Hamilton Park Trust
- Date opened: 1782
- Screened on: Racing TV
- Course type: Flat
- Notable races: Braveheart Stakes, Glasgow Stakes, Lanark Silver Bell, Scottish Stewards' Cup

Hamilton Park Racecourse is a thoroughbred horse racing venue in Hamilton, Scotland to the south of Glasgow. It is a flat racing venue, with a season which runs from May to September.

The very first race to take place in Hamilton was in 1782 at a site in Chatelherault, situated just outside the town. By 1785, the course had three racing fixtures and staged jump racing until 1907 when the course was closed.

In 1926, racing moved to their current location on Bothwell Road having raised £100,000 to revive racing. The racecourse opened with a two-day meeting held on Friday 16th and Saturday 17th July 1926, with 30,000 racegoers attending on the Friday, which was greatly exceeded on the Saturday.

The revival of racing at Hamilton Park made it one of the newest courses in the country and became the second course in Lanarkshire - with Lanark Racecourse later closing in 1977.

Hamilton Park was the first racecourse in the country to stage an evening meeting in 1947, something that is now common place through the industry. A Trust was formed in 1973 to secure racing at Hamilton Park for all time.

The present racecourse opened in 1926 and since 1973 it has been owned by the Hamilton Park Trust which ploughs back all profits into developing the course.

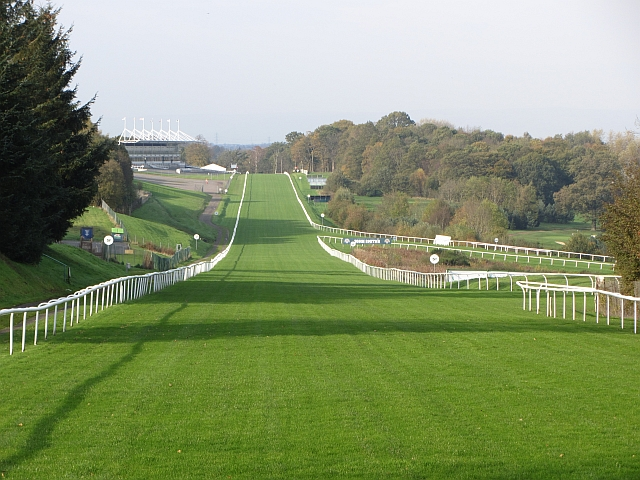
The entire straight course, showing its undulating nature

The Lanark Silver Bell is one of the most ancient Racing Trophies in Britain, yet its origins are disputed. The Bell disappeared without trace for many years. It was rediscovered in 1836 in Lanark Town Council’s vaults when they were in the process of moving to their new offices in Hope Street.

Many believed the Bell to have been gifted from King William ‘The Lion’ of Scotland in approximately 1165.

Studies of the various hallmarks on the newly rediscovered Bell linked them to silversmiths dating to the years 1587 and 1599.

The Silver Bell was a highly acclaimed race competed for annually at Lanark Racecourse. The old inscriptions on the trophy suggest that Sir Johne Hamilton of Trabovn was one of the first winners, in 1628, to have their name engraved on such a prestigious prize. Where the trophy was prior to this date is not known. Each year, the winner of the race would be awarded a replica of the original Bell. On occasion, for example the winner being a noted dignitary, the authentic trophy would be awarded for the period of that year.

The opening meeting at the ‘new’ racecourse in 1909 once again ran The Silver Bell, which was duly won by Lord Rosebery’s Dandyprat who was trained by Sam Darling and ridden by Freddy Fox. The last ever running of the Lanark Silver Bell was in 1977. The winner, Border River was owned and trained by Clifford Watts and ridden by David Nicholls. Mr Nicholls was also the last jockey to ride a double on Lanark racecourse after beating the field in the final race on board Mrs Bee for Eric Collingwood.

In 2008, the William Haggas trained Tifernati became the first winner of the Silver Bell for 31 years. This was followed by the aptly named Record Breaker, trained by Mark Johnston, who broke the course record when winning the race in 2009. 2019 saw trainer Michael Easterby win the Silver Bell with Elysian Flame, piloted to victory by jockey Nathan Evans.

In 2012, the racecourse unveiled a new Silver Bell Trophy to complement the original piece, handcrafted by Edinburgh jewellers and warrant holders to Her Majesty the Queen, Hamilton & Inches. Completed after a detailed six-month design process, the 100% sterling silver trophy reflects many of the hallmarks of the original artefact, which has now become too valuable to be presented to winners. After teaming up with Ladbrokes as sponsors of the fixture in a long term deal, the Hamilton Park team decided to make a new trophy with a refreshed contemporary feel, to sit alongside the ancient relic.

2022 saw the announcement of the upgrade of the Lanark Silver Bell to a £100,000 Heritage Handicap, as part of investment across the entire race programme.

== The Lanark Silver Bell Handicap Winners (2008 onwards) ==
2008 – Tifernati - William Haggas/Liam Jones

2009 – Record Breaker - Mark Johnston/Royston Ffrench

2010 – Just Lille - Ann Duffield/Barry McHugh

2011 – Shernando - Mark Johnston /Silvestre De Sousa

2012 – Edmaaj - David O’Meara/Daniel Tudhope

2013 – Special Meaning - Mark Johnston/Franny Norton

2014 – Swivel - Mark Johnston/Kevin Stott

2015 – Polarisation - Mark Johnston/Joe Fanning

2016 – Multellie - Tim Easterby/Cam Hardie

2017 – Sepal - Iain Jardine/Jamie Gormley

2018 – Archi’s Affaire - Michael Dods/Callum Rodriguez

2019 - Elysian Flame - Michael Easterby/Nathan Evans

2020 - Cancelled due to Covid

2021 - Mahrajaan - William Haggas / Paul Hanagan

== Entertainment venue ==
Hamilton Park is noted for its reputation of mixing good quality racing with glamour and entertainment. Top jockeys like Frankie Dettori have appeared at the racecourse and live music performances from the likes of Sophie Ellis Bextor, The Saturdays, The Wanted, Heather Small and Dario G have helped establish Hamilton Park as a high-profile venue in its area.

Continuing along this theme, the venue staged a sell-out stand alone JLS concert on 23 July 2010, along with live performances from The Saturdays and The X Factor finalists Olly Murs, Stacey Solomon and Danyl Johnson. In 2011 the Racecourse staged two stand alone concert events by the Wanted and Westlife. In 2012 the racecourse once again hosted two stand alone concerts by music legend Tom Jones and Australian pop star Peter Andre and reformed pop group Steps.

== Notable races ==
Month	DOW	Race Name	Type	Grade	Distance	Age/Sex
July	Friday	Glasgow Stakes	Flat	Listed	1m 3f 16y	3yo
August	Friday	Lanark Silver Bell	Flat	Heritage Handicap	1m 4f 15y	3yo+

Other races

- Braveheart Stakes (discontinued from 2015)
- Scottish Stewards' Cup
