= Lanark Castle =

Castle in South Lanarkshire, Scotland

- Caisteal Lannraig
- Lanark, Scotland

Site information
- Condition: Demolished

Location
- Location of the site of Lanark Castle within South Lanarkshire.
- Location within South Lanarkshire
- Coordinates: 55.6703°N 3.7837°W

Lanark Castle was the origin and heart of what later became the royal burgh of Lanark, Scotland. The town grew up outside the castle walls. Long since demolished, the castle lay high on the east bank of the River Clyde, near the confluence with the Mouse Water. The site is designated a scheduled monument.

As a key strategic high point over the Clyde Valley, the Romans built a fortification on what is still known as Castle Hill, south west of the modern town centre. Other fortifications were built on the site after the Romans' brief occupation of southern Scotland came to an end.

The castle was used as a royal residence by David I and William the Lion.

== Parliament of Kenneth II ==
Some records claim that Kenneth II held a parliament at Lanark Castle in 978. However, this is most likely not accurate. At this time, Lanark was a part of the Kingdom of Strathclyde. Lanark Castle was most likely built during the reign of David I, and was probably completed by 1144 when the town became a Royal Burgh.

== Popular culture ==
The castle features in the 1810 novel The Scottish Chiefs by Jane Porter.
