= Lanark Racecourse =

Horse racing venue in Lanark, Scotland

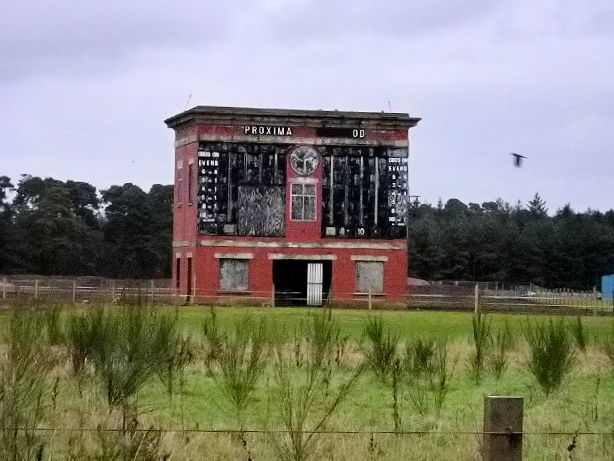
- The old odds/results board at Lanark
- Location: Lanark, Scotland
- Coordinates: 55°39′45″N 3°44′31″W
- Date closed: October 1977
- Course type: Flat
- Notable races: Lanark Silver Bell

Lanark Racecourse (closed October 1977) was a Scottish horse racing venue, situated in the small town of Lanark in Scotland's Central Belt, 25 miles (40 km) from Glasgow. It was reputedly founded by King William the Lion of Scotland (1165-1214).

== Overview ==
The course was a right-handed oval, 10 furlongs (2,000 m) round, with a run-in of around 3 1/2 furlongs (700 m). There was a straight course of 5 furlongs. It was home to Britain's oldest horse race, the Lanark Silver Bell, which after a gap of three decades following Lanark's closure, is now contested again at nearby Hamilton Park Racecourse. The original Silver Bell is commonly reported to have been a gift of William the Lion in the 12th century. While the original bell no longer exists, the present one dates from the 17th century. The course also staged the longest handicap in the Scottish racing calendar, the 2 1/2-mile (4.0 km) William the Lion Handicap, which closed the Scottish flat racing season.

The first aviation meeting to be held in Scotland was held at Lanark Racecourse between 6 and 13 August 1910. This location was chosen because the land was relatively flat, the racecourse already had facilities for a paying public, there were stables to act as hangars for the aeroplanes and the racecourse was accessible by both road and by rail, especially as The Caledonian Railway Company were prepared to construct a new station near the main entrance. The aeroplanes were transported to the meeting by rail, as aviation technology at the time was not advanced enough to safely fly there. The Lanark meeting took place shortly after a similar event in Bournemouth at which Charles Rolls died. Influenced by this, it was decided that no aircraft would fly closer than 300 yards (270 m) away from the spectators. For the first time, aeroplanes were accurately timed over a straight measured distance, allowing the first world records to be set, covering flights over one mile (1.6 km). The meeting was described by The Aero magazine as 'the most successful yet held in Britain'.

Racing at Lanark was of a modest quality, and race meetings were only attended by the faithful Scottish race-goer. It closed in October 1977 due to financial problems. The remains of the course are still visible today.

== Bibliography ==
- Brook, Alexander J. S. (9 March 1891). "Notice of the Silver Bell of Lanark, a Horse-racing Trophy of the Seventeenth Century: With Some References to the Early Practice of Horse-racing in Scotland" (PDF). Proceedings of the Society of Antiquaries of Scotland. Edinburgh: 174–188. OCLC 12856854.
- Mortimer, Roger; Onslow, Richard; Willett, Peter (1978). Biographical Encyclopaedia of British Racing. London: Macdonald and Jane's. ISBN 0-354-08536-0.
- Wright, Howard (1986). The Encyclopaedia of Flat Racing. London: Robert Hale. ISBN 0-7090-2639-0.
