= Lanark =

Town in South Lanarkshire, Scotland

Coordinates: 55.674903°N 3.777019°W

Lanark: Scottish Gaelic: Lannraig; Scots: Lanrik
- Town
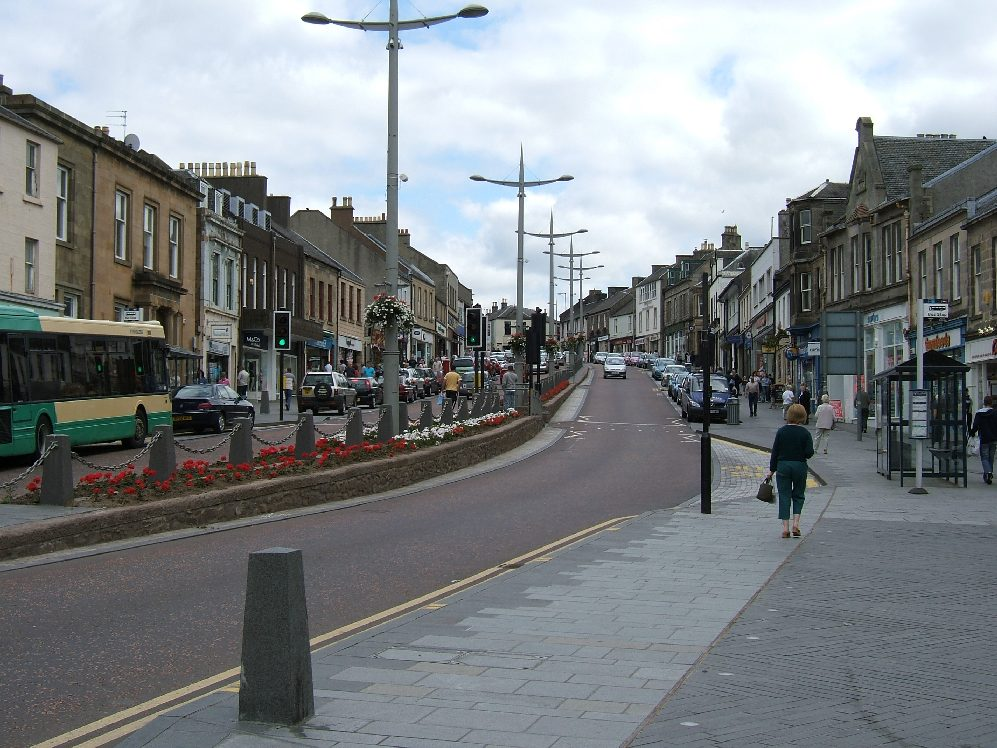
- Lanark High Street, August 2006

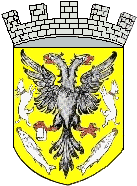
- Coat of Arms of the Royal Burgh of Lanark

- Location within South Lanarkshire
- Population: 8,943 (2022)
- OS grid reference: NS8843
  - Edinburgh: 29 1/2 miles (47.5 km)
  - London: 325 miles (523 km)
- Council area: South Lanarkshire
- Lieutenancy area: Lanarkshire
- Country: Scotland
- Sovereign state: United Kingdom
- Post town: LANARK
- Postcode district: ML11
- Dialling code: 01555
- Police: Scotland
- Fire: Scottish
- Ambulance: Scottish
- UK Parliament: Lanark and Hamilton East
- Scottish Parliament: Clydesdale

Lanark (/ˈlænərk/ LAN-ərk; Scottish Gaelic: Lannraig [ˈl̪ˠaun̪ˠɾɪkʲ]; Scots: Lanrik) is a historic market town in South Lanarkshire, Scotland, located 12 miles to the south-east of Hamilton. The town lies on the River Clyde, at its confluence with Mouse Water. It had a population of 8,943 in 2022.

Lanark was usually a royal burgh from 1140 to 1975, and was historically the county town of Lanarkshire, though in modern times this title belongs to Hamilton. Notable landmarks nearby include New Lanark, the Corra Linn and the site of Lanark Castle.

Lanark railway station and bus interchange have frequent services to Glasgow. Its shops serve the local agricultural community and surrounding villages. The outskirts of the town are home to a large modern livestock auction market and biscuit manufacturer Border Biscuits Ltd.

== History ==
=== Medieval period ===
The town's name is believed to come from the Brythonic Lanerc meaning "clear space, glade".

In May 1297, the action at Lanark is said to have seen William Wallace, later a prominent figure in the First War of Scottish Independence, joining the uprisings taking place across Scotland with an attack on the English Sheriff of Lanark, William de Heselrig, killing the sheriff and many of his men.

=== 16th–19th centuries ===
Lanark originally had four town gates: West Port, East Port, Wellgate and Castlegate. West Port gate was demolished in the 1770s. Toll gates were constructed at Cartland Bridge and Lanark Racecourse around 1820. These were relocated to the former site of Lanark Auction Market after tolls were abolished in 1883, but the Cartland Bridge toll gates are still extant, and are protected as a listed building.

=== Early 20th century ===
The first aviation meeting in Scotland was held at Lanark Racecourse between 6 and 13 August 1910. This location was chosen because the land was relatively flat, the racecourse already had facilities for a paying public, there were stables to act as hangars for the aeroplanes, and the racecourse was accessible both by road and by rail, especially as the Caledonian Railway Company was prepared to construct a new station near the main entrance. The aeroplanes were transported to the meeting by rail, as aviation technology at the time was not advanced enough to safely fly there. The Lanark meeting took place shortly after a similar event in Bournemouth at which Charles Rolls died. Influenced by this, it was decided that no aircraft would fly closer than 300 yards (270 m) away from the spectators. For the first time, aeroplanes were accurately timed over a straight measured distance, allowing the first world records to be set, covering flights over 1 mile (1.6 km). The meeting was described by The Aero magazine as 'the most successful yet held in Britain'.

A permanent military presence was established in the town with the completion of Winston Barracks in the 1930s.

=== Modern period ===
Colonel Duncan Carter-Campbell and HM Queen Elizabeth II inspecting the guard of honour of the Cameronians (Scottish Rifles) during the Queen's visit to Lanark in June 1953

On 29 June 1953, Queen Elizabeth II visited Lanark to mark her coronation.

== Governance ==
=== Local government ===
Lanark is within the South Lanarkshire unitary authority area. In local elections, it is part of the Clydesdale North ward which elects three councillors. Following the 2022 election, Clydesdale North is represented by Richard Eliott-Lockhart of the Scottish Conservative and Unionist Party, Julia Marrs of the Scottish National Party, and Catherine McClymont of Scottish Labour.

=== Scottish Parliament ===
In elections to the Scottish Parliament, Lanark is part of the Clydesdale constituency, and also contributes to the election of seven additional list members as part of the South of Scotland region. The current Clydesdale MSP is Aileen Campbell of the SNP, who defeated the Labour incumbent Karen Gillon in the 2011 election after Gillon had held the seat since 1999.

=== Parliament of the United Kingdom ===
In Westminster elections, Lanark is part of the Lanark and Hamilton East constituency. Labour's Jimmy Hood represented the area in Parliament from 1987 until 2015; since then the MP has been Angela Crawley.

== Landmarks ==
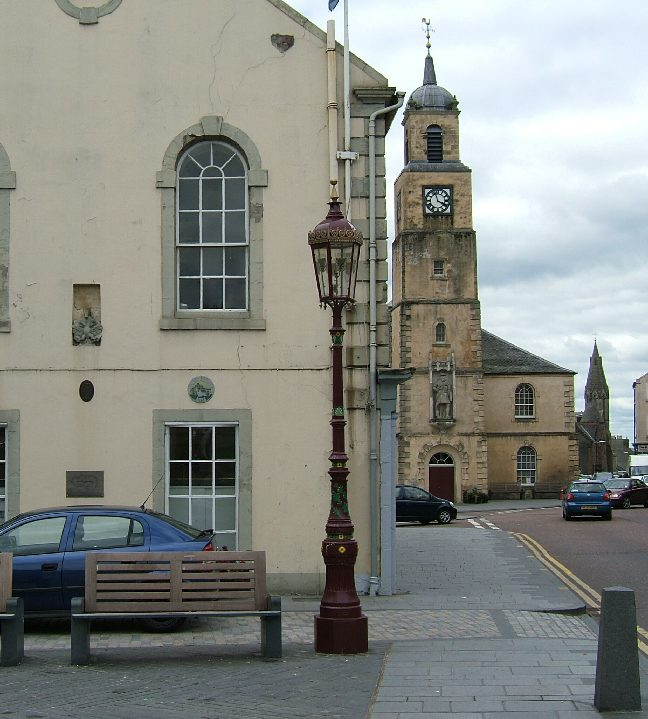
Gas lamp known as the "Provost's Lamp" outside Lanark Tolbooth (on the left)

There are 14 historical closes or vennels in the town: these are alleyways allowing access to the High Street. Some are named after an original shop owner; one is named Wallace Close as it depicts key moments of William Wallace's life in Lanark.

Visitors to the town can visit the nearby World Heritage Site of New Lanark, close to the Falls of Clyde, the Corehouse estate and the Scottish Wildlife Trust's Corehouse Nature Reserve.

The Lanark Museum is located in West Port, inside the YMCA building.

A large boating lake, Lanark Loch, adjoins Lanark Golf Club, which has an 18-hole course and a 9-hole course. The former racecourse now offers pony-trekking activities.

The town's Castlebank Park lies near the former site of Lanark Castle, and allows access to the River Clyde and the Clyde Walkway.

An ornate gas lamp, known as the provost's lamp, stands at the bottom of the High Street. After the burgh council was abolished in 1975, the provost's lamp, which had historically been placed outside the house of the provost as one of their marks of office, was permanently relocated to the pavement just to the east of Lanark Tolbooth.

=== Churches ===
One of the churches in the town bears the name of The Old Church of St Kentigern (perhaps better known as St Mungo), who set up many medieval churches in the Scottish Lowlands, including Glasgow, and died around 612. The town's cemetery stands on the site of this church, and includes many Covenanter graves.

St. Nicholas' Church

St. Nicholas Parish Church stands at the bottom of the High Street. The church bell is believed to date from 1110, and may be one of the oldest church bells in the world. It was moved from The Old Church of St Kentigern when St. Nicholas Church was built in 1774. It has been recast four times, including in 1659 and 1983. There is an 8-foot (2.45 m) statue of William Wallace in the steeple. This was sculpted by Robert Forrest, from an ancient drawing in the possession of the Society of Antiquaries of Scotland.

== Lanimers ==
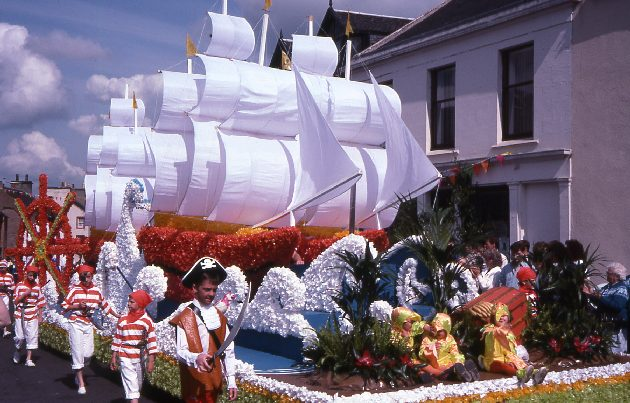
Lanark Lanimers, 2006

This historic background forms the basis for the Lanark Lanimers, which are celebrated each year for one week in June. Local primary schoolchildren elect a Lanimers queen and court; and a Lord Cornet is chosen from local businessmen. On the Monday night the Perambulation of the Marches takes place, when townspeople turn out to walk around half the town boundary, following the Lord Cornets past and present as they inspect the border-stones. Traditionally, the townspeople carry "birks" (Scots for "sticks of birch"), which are small branches of birch trees cut from the woods at the Glenburnie estate. This tradition was started in 1948 by Joseph Doolan, whose family owned the land. The other half of the boundary is inspected on the Wednesday night, again led by the Lord Cornet accompanied by many local riders who participate in the Riding of the Marches, locally referred to as the Rideout. On the Thursday morning, schools and other organisations parade before the Lanimer Queen in themed dress, accompanied by pipe bands. The best Lanimer Lorries win prizes, and after the parade the crowning of the Queen takes place on a temporary stand erected in front of St Nicholas' Church, under the statue of William Wallace. The Queen holds a reception party in the town's Memorial Hall on the Friday night, where children perform songs and dances.

== Notable people ==
William Wallace is considered one of the most notable people in Lanark's history. A key leader in the Scottish Wars of Independence, he is known to have first "drawn his sword to free his native land" at Lanark in 1297, killing the English sheriff Haselrig. An 8-foot statue of Wallace sits on St Nicholas Church at the town cross dating back to 1817 which was sculpted by Carluke-born Robert Forrest.

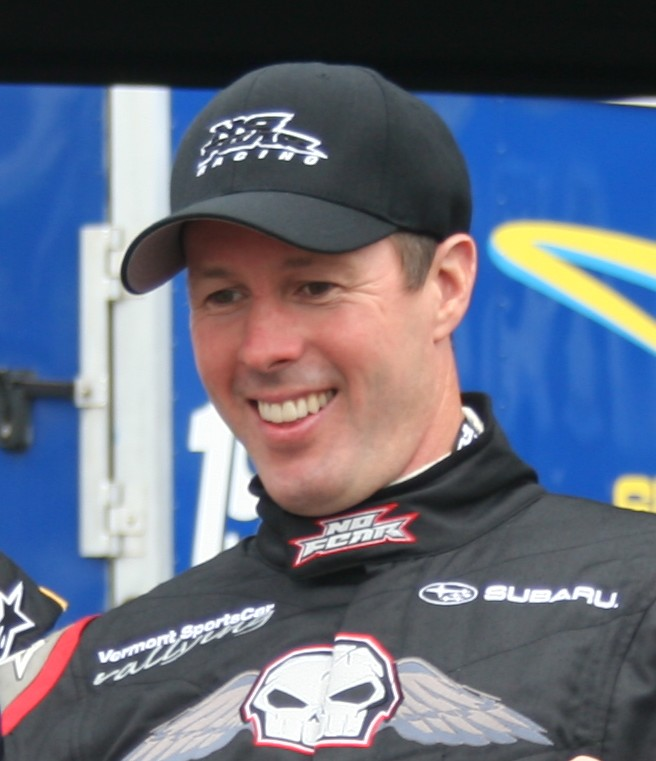
Colin McRae (1968–2007), a British and World Rally Champion from Lanark

Other notable figures from Lanark include:

- William Smellie (1697–1763), obstetrician
- Robert McQueen, Lord Braxfield (1722–1799), senior Scottish judge known as the "hanging judge"
- Margaret Agnes Bunn (1799–1883), actress
- William Budge (1828–1919), prominent member of the Church of Jesus Christ of Latter-day Saints
- Walter Elliot (1888–1958), Scottish Unionist party politician who served in various cabinet roles
- Judith Hart (1924–1991), Labour Party politician who was the Minister for Overseas Development and later elevated to the House of Lords
- Colin Cameron (b. 1933), lawyer and Malawian politician
- Jimmy McRae (b. 1943), five time British Rally Champion in 1981, 1982, 1984, 1987 and 1988, father of Colin and Alister McRae
- Billy Ritchie (b. 1944), rock music's first lead keyboard player and pioneer of progressive rock
- Colin McRae (1968–2007), rally driver who was the British Rally Champion in 1991 and 1992 and World Rally Champion in 1995, son of Jimmy McRae and brother of Alister McRae
- Alister McRae (b. 1970), British Rally Champion in 1995, son of Jimmy McRae and brother of Colin McRae
- Imogen Walker, Labour Party politician and wife of Morgan McSweeney

== Gallery ==
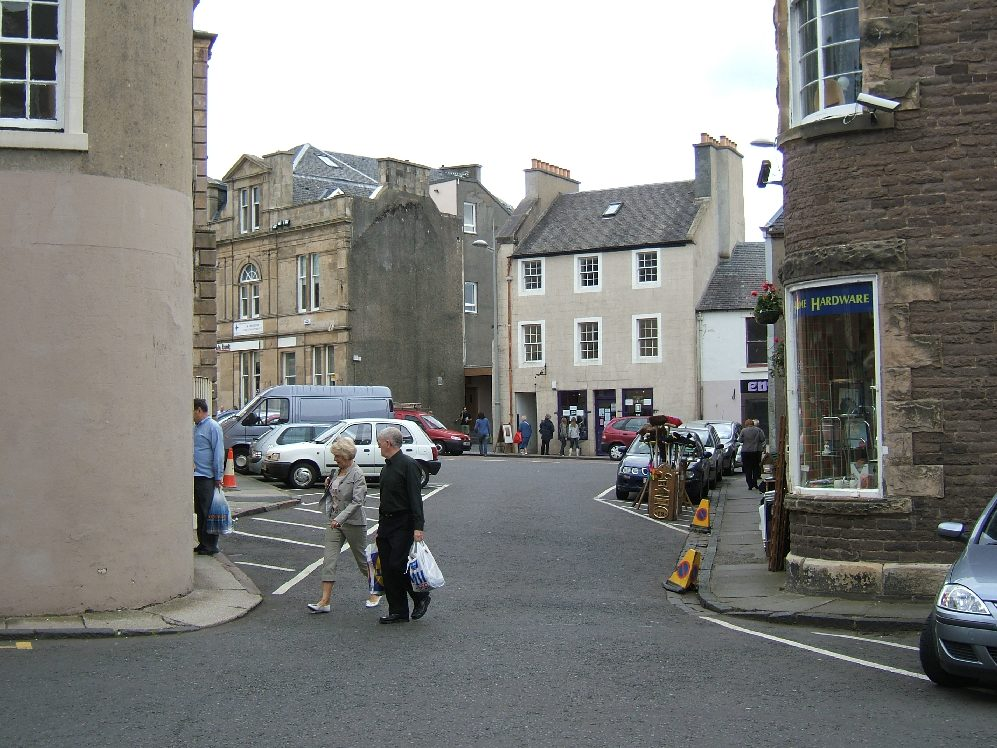
Town centre

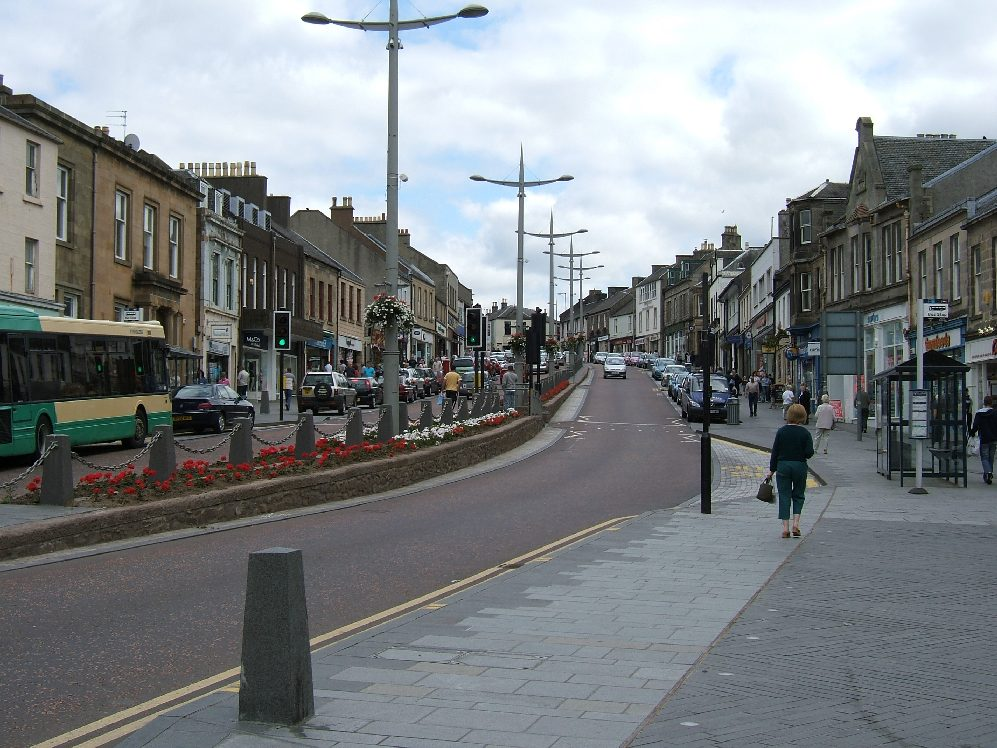
High Street

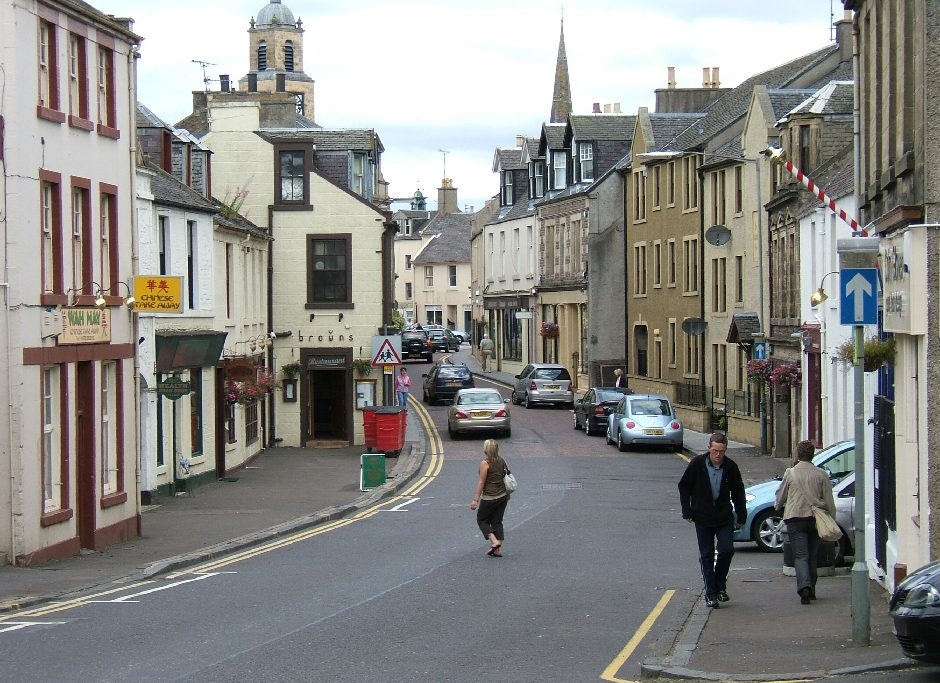
Wellgate

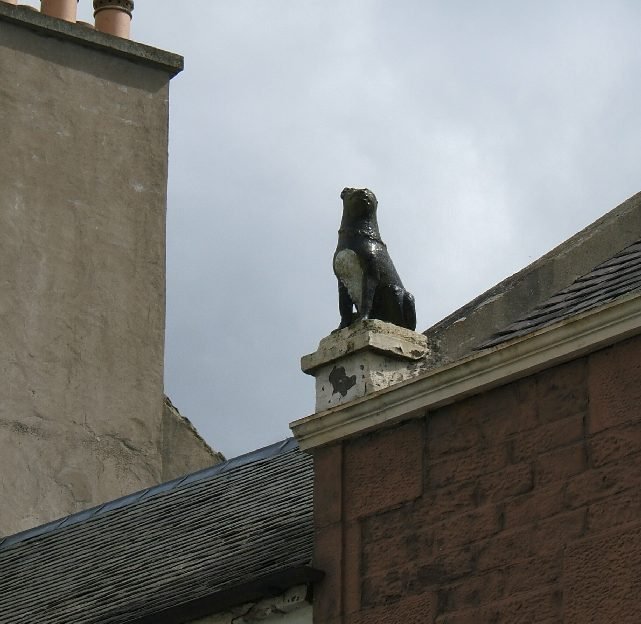
The "Girnin Dug" statue of a dog erected as a reproach to a neighbour suspected of poisoning the pet

== See also ==
- Lanark (Parliament of Scotland constituency)
- The Lanark Silver Bell, a horseracing trophy
- Lanark County in Ontario, Canada
- Lanark, Ontario, a village in Lanark County
- Lanark Grammar School
- Bonnington Pavilion, a nearby historic feature.
- Whuppity Scoorie Day
- Lanark Lanimers
