= Blackwood railway station =

Blackwood railway station may refer to:

- Blackwood railway station, Adelaide
- Blackwood railway station (Strathclyde)
- Blackwood railway station (Wales)
