= Bankend, South Lanarkshire =

Coordinates: 55.580680°N 3.901624°W

Bankend
- Location within South Lanarkshire
- Council area: South Lanarkshire
- Lieutenancy area: Lanarkshire
- Country: Scotland
- Sovereign state: United Kingdom
- Police: Scotland
- Fire: Scottish
- Ambulance: Scottish
- UK Parliament: Lanark and Hamilton East
- Scottish Parliament: Clydesdale

Bankend is a village in South Lanarkshire, Scotland. It is located near the villages of Braehead, Coalburn and Cumberhead.

== History ==
Sometime after the opening of Coalburn railway station in 1891, Bankend railway station opened. It was the terminus of the Coalburn Branch, and closed in July 1926. There was also a Bankend Tramway around the same time. As a result of opencast coal mining, the mining village of Bankend was obliterated.

== See also ==
- List of places in South Lanarkshire
