= Auchlochan =

Hamlet in Scotland

Coordinates: 55.617090°N 3.891100°W

Auchlochan: Scottish Gaelic: Achadh an Lochain
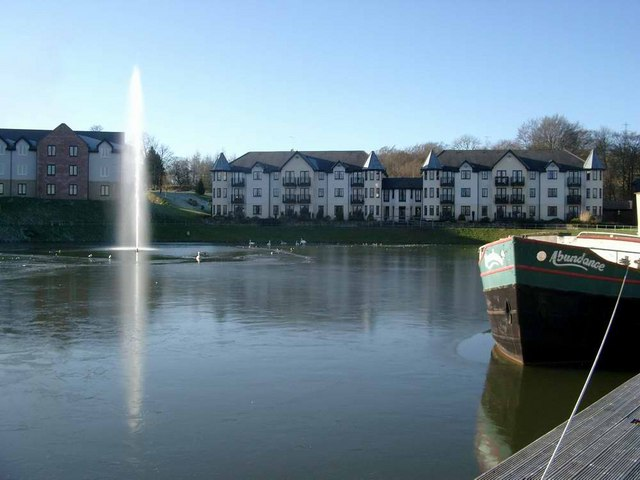
- New accommodation at Auchlochan, 2007

- Location within South Lanarkshire
- Council area: South Lanarkshire
- Lieutenancy area: Lanarkshire
- Country: Scotland
- Sovereign state: United Kingdom
- Police: Scotland
- Fire: Scottish
- Ambulance: Scottish
- UK Parliament: Lanark and Hamilton East
- Scottish Parliament: Clydesdale

Auchlochan is a village in South Lanarkshire, Scotland. It is on the River Nethan and is located near the villages of Birkwood, Braehead and Coalburn, with the nearest village being Coalburn.

== History ==
From 1890 to 1968, they were several collieries in the area, known generally as the Auchlochan Collieries. From 1907 to 1965, there was a railway station called Auchlochan Platform.

== Overview ==
There is a Methodist Homes (MHA) retirement village in Auchlochlan, and the Hollandbush Golf Club is just south of the village.

== Notable residents ==
- Ivy Wallace (1915–2006), author and illustrator
- George Patterson (1920–2012), engineer and missionary

== See also ==
- List of places in South Lanarkshire
