= Tredegar railway station =

Former railway station in Wales

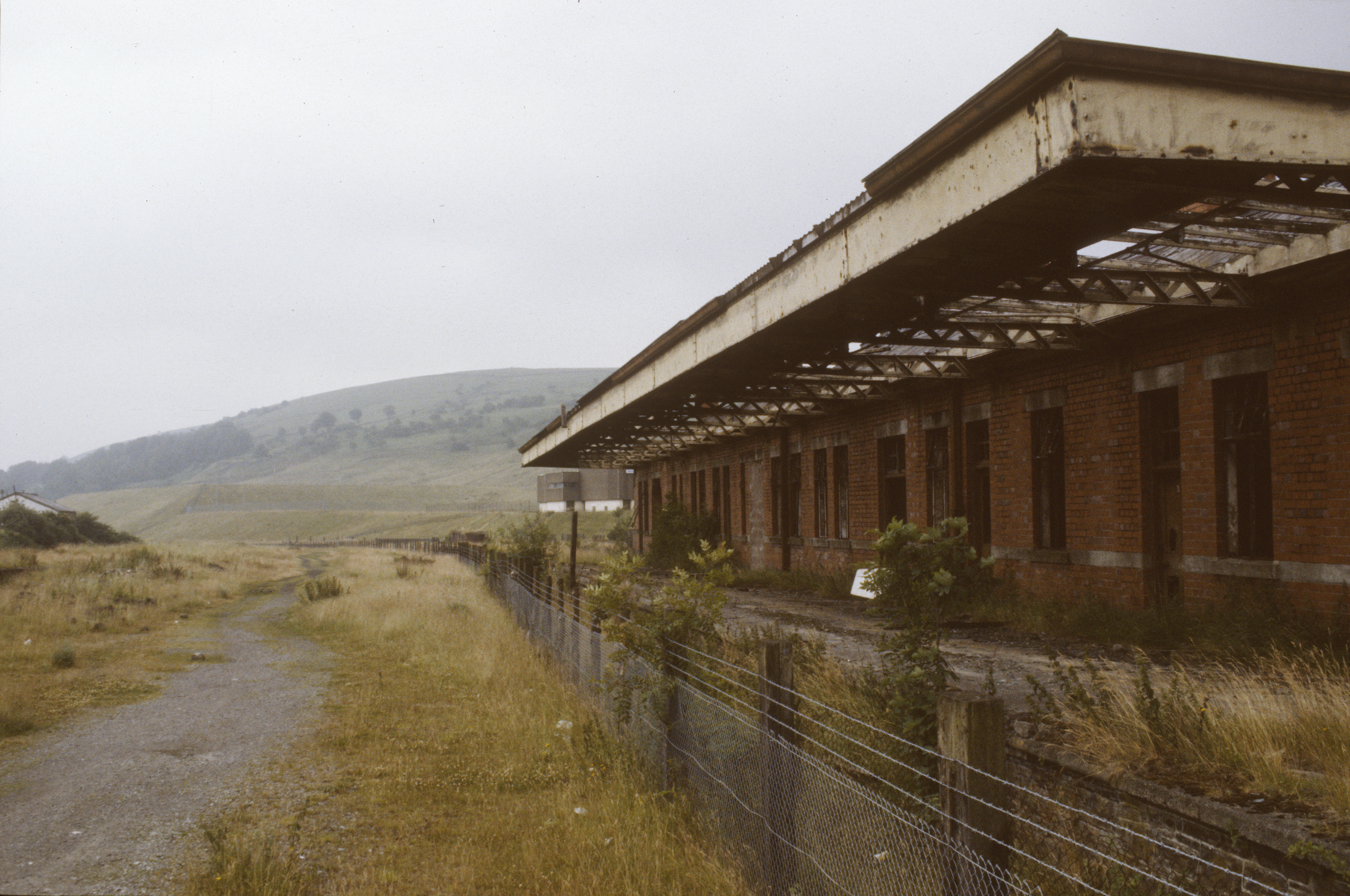
- Abandoned station (1987)

General information
- Location: Tredegar, Blaenau Gwent; Wales
- Coordinates: 51.7673°N 3.2409°W
- Grid reference: SO144083
- Platforms: 1

Other information
- Status: Demolished

History
- Original company: Sirhowy Railway
- Pre-grouping: London and North Western Railway
- Post-grouping: London, Midland and Scottish Railway

Key dates
- 19 June 1865: Station opened
- 13 June 1960: Station closed to passengers
Location

Tredegar railway station was a station on the Sirhowy Railway. It served the town of Tredegar. The station was near the southern edge of Bedwellty Park.

== History ==
The station was opened on 19 June 1865 by the Sirhowy Railway after the conversion of the Sirhowy Tramroad to a standard gauge railway.

The line south from Tredegar closed to goods traffic on 30 April 1969,

== Accidents ==
On 17 December 1902 a fatal accident occurred when a train from Tredegar to Nantybwch with 9 loaded coal wagons and a brake van was stopped on the incline of 1 in 42 near Nantybwch. The driver uncoupled the engine for adjustments; on recoupling he backed the engine on to the wagons, setting them in motion back down the hill until they reached Tredegar, about 1½ miles distant, where a disastrous collision occurred.

== Present day ==
The route has been reused by the modern A4048 road;

== Route ==
Preceding station	Disused railways	Following station
Sirhowy	London, Midland and Scottish Railway; Sirhowy Railway	Bedwellty Pits Halt
