= Bedwellty Pits Halt railway station =

Disused railway station in Tredegar, Blaenau Gwent

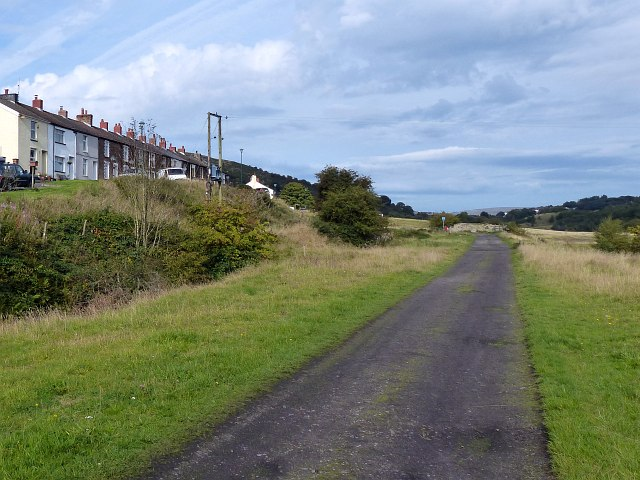
- Former railway track and site of station, Bedwellty Pits

General information
- Location: Tredegar, Blaenau Gwent; Wales
- Coordinates: 51.7462°N 3.2223°W
- Grid reference: SO157059
- Platforms: 2

Other information
- Status: Disused

History
- Original company: Sirhowy Railway
- Pre-grouping: London and North Western Railway
- Post-grouping: London, Midland and Scottish Railway

Key dates
- 1866: Station opened
- 13 June 1960: Station closed
Location

Bedwellty Pits Halt railway station was a station on the Sirhowy Railway. It was initially spelled Bedwelty, then known as Bedwellty Pits, and finally Bedwellty Pits Halt. It consisted of 2 wooden platforms to serve the workforce of the local colliery, which is 2 miles south of Tredegar in the Sirhowy Valley.

== History ==
Bedwellty Pits Colliery was opened in 1850, and was served by sidings connected to the Sirhowy Railway. The station was opened in 1866 by the Sirhowy Railway after the conversion of the Sirhowy Tramroad to a standard gauge railway. It was closed to passenger traffic on 13 June 1960.

== Present day ==
The route now forms part of National Cycle Route 467; there are no remains of the station at the site.

== Route ==
Preceding station	Disused railways	Following station
Tredegar	London, Midland and Scottish Railway; Sirhowy Railway	Pochin Pits Colliery Platform
