= Pochin Pits Colliery Platform railway station =

Disused railway station in Tredegar, Blaenau Gwent

Pochin Pits Colliery Platform

General information
- Location: Tredegar, Monmouthshire; Wales
- Platforms: 1

Other information
- Status: Disused

History
- Original company: London and North Western Railway
- Pre-grouping: London and North Western Railway

Key dates
- October 1893: Opened as Pochin Pits Colliery Platform
- September 1922: Closed to passengers
- 2 October 1922: Name changed to Pochin Pits
- 13 June 1960: Closed to miners

Pochin Pits Colliery Platform railway station served Pochin Pits Colliery which was in Tredegar, in the historic county of Monmouthshire, Wales, from 1893 to 1960 on the Sirhowy Railway.

== History ==
The station was opened in October 1893 by the London and North Western Railway. It was only open on Saturdays and services only ran to Newport initially but it later ran both ways. It closed to passengers in September 1922 but stayed open for miners until 13 June 1960.

Preceding station	Disused railways	Following station
Bedwellty Pits Halt; Line and station closed	London and North Western Railway; Sirhowy Railway	Holly Bush; Line and station closed
