= Holly Bush railway station =

Disused railway station in Hollybush, Caerphilly

Holly Bush
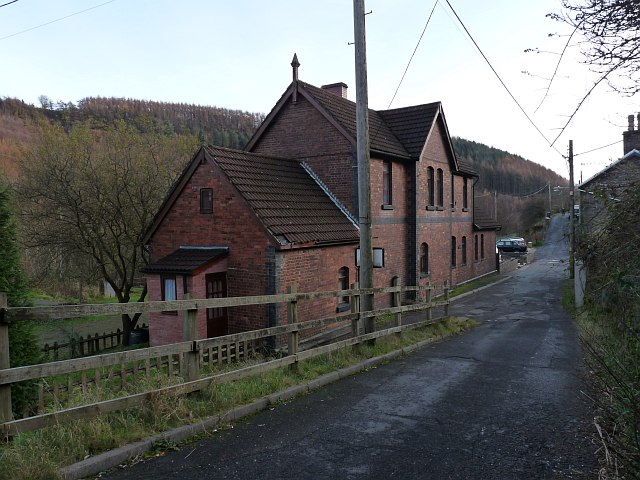
- The former station building in 2021

General information
- Location: Hollybush, Monmouthshire; Wales
- Coordinates: 51.7231°N 3.2092°W
- Grid reference: SO165034
- Platforms: 2

Other information
- Status: Disused

History
- Original company: Sirhowy Railway
- Pre-grouping: London and North Western Railway
- Post-grouping: London, Midland and Scottish Railway

Key dates
- August 1871: Opened
- 31 August 1891: Resited and opened as Hollybush
- 1 December 1899: Name changed to Holly Bush
- 13 June 1960: Closed
Location

Holly Bush railway station served the village of Hollybush, in the historical county of Monmouthshire, Wales, from 1871 to 1960 on the Sirhowy Railway.

== History ==
The station was opened in August 1871 by the Sirhowy Railway, although it was advertised earlier for Blackwood Gala and Picnic on 14 May 1866 and in May 1867; it appeared as Holly Bush in these. It was resited and reused on 31 August 1891 but it opened as Hollybush. Its name was changed to Holly Bush on 1 December 1899. It closed on 13 June 1960.

Preceding station	Disused railways	Following station
Pochin Pits Colliery Platform; Line and station closed	Sirhowy Railway	Markham Village Halt; Line and station closed
