= Coalburn =

Village in South Lanarkshire, Scotland

Coordinates: 55.59°N 3.89°W

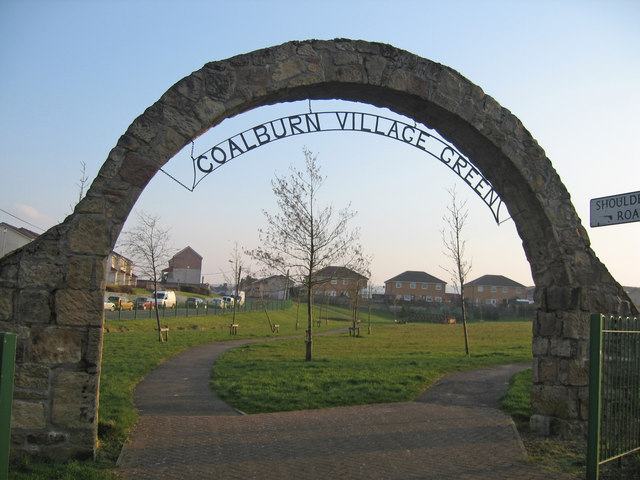
- Coalburn Village Green in 2007

- Location within South Lanarkshire
- Area: 0.38 km^{2} (0.15 sq mi)
- Population: 1,220 (2020)
  - Density: 3,211/km^{2} (8,320/sq mi)
- OS grid reference: NS810348
  - Edinburgh: 37 mi (60 km) NE
  - London: 322 mi (518 km) SE
- Civil parish: Lesmahagow
- Community council: Coalburn
- Council area: South Lanarkshire
- Lieutenancy area: Lanarkshire
- Country: Scotland
- Sovereign state: United Kingdom
- Post town: LANARK
- Postcode district: ML11
- Dialling code: 01555
- Police: Scotland
- Fire: Scottish
- Ambulance: Scottish
- UK Parliament: Dumfriesshire, Clydesdale and Tweeddale
- Scottish Parliament: Clydesdale

Coalburn is a village in South Lanarkshire, Scotland. It is located near the villages of Auchlochan, Bankend and Braehead.

== History ==
The opencast mine that opened in the village in the late 1980s became the biggest mine in Europe by the early 1990s.

In 2010 the village had a population of 1,267. This declined to 1,220 in a mid 2020 estimate.

== Education ==
Coalburn Primary is a primary school in Coalburn. Their affiliated high school Lesmahagow High School is in the neighbouring town of Lesmahagow.

== See also ==
- Auchlochan Collieries
- Coalburn railway station
