= The Animal Shelf =

Children's television series

- Genre: Children's
- Created by: Ivy Wallace
- Developed by: John Sachs
- Written by: Chris Allen; Julia Allen
- Directed by: Ellen Meske (Series 1 and 2); Andy Joule (Series 3 and 4); Susan Roman (voices, United States/Canada)
- Voices of: Jimmy Hibbert; Sue Ryding; Susan Sheridan
- Narrated by: Susan Sheridan (UK only)
- Theme music composer: Ernie Wood
- Opening theme: Five Soft Toys on a Little Blue Shelf
- Ending theme: Five Soft Toys on a Little Blue Shelf (Reprise)
- Composer: Ernie Wood
- Country of origin: United Kingdom
- Original language: English
- No. of seasons: 4
- No. of episodes: 52

Production
- Executive producer: Mark Hall
- Producers: Jackie Cockle (Series 1 and 2); Francis Vose (Series 3 and 4)
- Production location: Unknown
- Cinematography: Unknown
- Editors: Zyggy Markiewicz (audio pre-production); Jereen Nadorp (audio and mixing); Ronald Nadorp (audio and mixing, Series 1 and 2); Flicks (edit); Hullaballoo (audio) (Series 3 and 4)
- Camera setup: Patrick Reets (model, Series 1 and 2); John Duffy (Series 3 and 4)
- Running time: 10 minutes per episode (approx.)
- Production company: Cosgrove Hall Films

Original release
- Network: ITV (CITV)
- Release: June 25, 1997 – August 3, 2000

Related
- Mecharnics

The Animal Shelf is a British animated children's television series produced by Cosgrove Hall Films, and based on the books written and illustrated by British writer Ivy Wallace about a group of talking toy animals who live in a young boy's bedroom. Aimed particularly at pre-school children, The Animal Shelf first aired on ITV running for 4 seasons and 52 episodes, running from 25 June 1997 to 3 August 2000.

== Characters ==
- Timothy (voiced by Susan Sheridan in the United Kingdom and Marc Donato in the United States) is the shelf animals' young and friendly owner who occasionally goes to school (and sometimes a few other places). Like all of the other human characters in the programme (apart from Mr Trigg, who is only shown from the neck down), only his shadow is seen on-screen.
- Gumpa the Bear (voiced by Jimmy Hibbert in the UK and Chris Marren in the US) is the leader of the shelf animals, and is the oldest of Timothy's five toy animals.
- Little Mutt (voiced by Susan Sheridan in the United Kingdom and Jill Frappier in the United States) is a tiny white dog or another bear with a pink bow, who is still close friends with Gumpa.
- Woeful the Monkey (voiced by Jimmy Hibbert in the UK and David Berni in the US) wears a red fez and coat. He often acts, and speaks, without thinking. He often says "Brilliant" when in a good mood. He still has a good heart.
- Stripey the Zebra (voiced by Jimmy Hibbert in the United Kingdom and Jen Gould in the United States) is thoughtful, kind, wise, and is Getup's best friend. In the United Kingdom version, Stripey himself speaks with a West Country Accent.
- Getup the Giraffe (voiced by Susan Sheridan in the United Kingdom and Linda Ballantyne in the United States) is Stripey's black-eyed best friend, with brown hair on her long neck, although she is still close friends with the other four shelf animals. Getup often falls over, (mostly onto her tummy) hence the name Getup. In the UK dub, she speaks with a broad English accent. She was originally male in Ivy Wallace's books. In one story, she has a crush on Stripey.
- Mr. Trigg (voiced by Jimmy Hibbert in the UK) is a friendly pet shop owner. He is the only human character in the show to appear onscreen, albeit only from the neck down.
- Parrot (voiced by Jimmy Hibbert in the UK) is Mr Trigg's only pet parrot, who enjoys mimicking others.
- Mrs Mole and her Baby Moles are a family of moles who live underground. The moles themselves only squeak instead of talking.
- Kinker the Mouse once caught his tail in a mouse trap, but he managed to escape, so he is named after the kink that it left in his tail. He cannot speak, and can only communicate with body language, although the five shelf animals understand him.
- Jick the Jackdaw – A wild jackdaw that takes up residence in the roof of the house near Timothy's garden. In the United States dub, Jick the Jackdaw is renamed as Carl the Crow.
- Squirrel - A red squirrel who is the Shelf Animals' second best friend who lives in a tree in Bluebell Wood, not far from Timothy's house.
- The Caterpillar – A red and yellow striped caterpillar with eight pairs of legs who lives in Timothy's front garden near the moles' trapdoor.
- Roger – Timothy's best friend in Timothy's school who is not at all shown on-screen and mentioned (in some episodes) by Timothy himself.

== Episode guide ==
Every episode in The Animal Shelf series is 10 minutes long.

=== Series 1 (1997) ===
1. Stripey to the Rescue – Stripey sets off to rescue Getup when, one dark night, she is kidnapped by a travelling funfair, where she meets Kinker, the squeaky Mouse. Meanwhile, Timothy, the animals' young and friendly owner, comes down with a cold and has to stay in bed, while Doctor tries to cure him. Meanwhile, Stripey himself nearly gets taken to a jumble sale by Mr Tompkins, thinking that he and Getup encourage germs.
2. Gumpa and the Paintbox – Gumpa fakes illness by printing red spots all over himself, and pretending to have the measles.
3. Getup Crusoe – When Getup loses all her brown spots after falling in Splashing Stream, the other animals' teasing drives her to set up a solitary home in Bluebell Wood.
4. Kinker visits The Animal Shelf – Stripey and Getup rescue Kinker the squeaky mouse from Mr Trigg's pet shop. Kinker himself visits the five toy animals in their home.
5. The Treasure Hunt – Getup and Stripey come across some buried treasure somewhere in Timothy's front garden, but Gumpa only finds some onions on the ground.
6. Music in the Woods – Timothy wants his animals to help him find five different birds' feathers in Bluebell Wood from School's Nature Table, but Mr Trigg's parrot has other ideas – he wants the toy animals themselves to make their own music, using only some toy musical instruments that Timothy lends to them earlier on.
7. The Animals' Garden –
8. Woeful and the Waspberries – Woeful ventures into Bluebell Wood in search of some raspberries for Timothy's upcoming birthday.
9. Gumpa solves a jigsaw puzzle – One warm Spring day sees three of Timothy's animals, including Gumpa, attempt to solve a jigsaw puzzle out in Timothy's front garden. When Timothy is called in for tea, however, Woeful accidentally knocks over the almost-completed jigsaw puzzle, causing one of the jigsaw puzzle's pieces to fly into his bright red hat.
10. Tidying Timothy's Bedroom –
11. The Trail – The animals enjoy following a series of clues around Timothy's garden, in spite of Squirrel moving one of the clues away, thinking that it is an arrow made entirely out of acorns.
12. The Model Monster – Inspired by Timothy's model ship, (made out of an eggs box and a cornflake packet) the animals make their own models from old bits and pieces. Gumpa builds himself an aeroplane which unfortunately falls to bits shortly before Take-Off, and in spite of a sudden brief Summer shower, Woeful makes himself (and ends up trapped inside) a robot-suit, which soon falls to bits as well.
13. Little Mut Goes Flying –

=== Series 2 (1998) ===
1. Babysitting for Mrs Mole - Timothy has a long School day ahead of him, so the five special toy animals try their absolute hardest to look after Mrs Mole’s babies, all while Mrs Mole herself visits her sick sister far away.
2. Timothy's Pet Balloon – Despite Timothy winning a large model rabbit made out of blue balloons at Roger's party, the animals are forced to stay one night in a rather disgusting hutch in Timothy's garden, which is ordered in the post by Mr Tompkins.
3. The Great Explorers –
4. The Alarm Clock – Timothy has trouble getting out of bed in time for school in the mornings, so his mother decides to have an alarm clock on Timothy's dresser, which unfortunately goes off in the middle of the night, waking up all five animals in the process, including Little Mut.
5. The Wolf in the Wood – The five toy animals have fantastic fun in Timothy's front garden, building three different houses to live in, but they also have a difficult time dealing with Woeful, who confidently plays the role of the big bad wolf.
6. Woeful Flies to the Moon – Woeful uses an old litter bin to take Getup and the other four animals to Bluebell Wood for a rather exciting moon walk.
7. Captain Gumpa – Gumpa acts as a Ship's Captain when he becomes the oldest one out of the five Special animals.
8. The Hottest Day Of The Year – On a hot Summer's day, Timothy suggests that the five toy animals think of the best possible way to keep cool, all while his mother takes him to a swimming pool to cool off.
9. The Mystery Of The Pictures – The shelf crew are puzzled about what they see in their bedroom when, one very hard morning, they borrow Timothy's Polaroid camera (after politely asking him first if they can do so).
10. Timothy's Guest – The remarkable animal group feel put out when Timothy's cousin has to take his dog to stay at Timothy's house for the weekend.
11. Little Mut Finds an Egg – As Timothy goes off to play Golf for the day, Little Mut and the other four animals try to find some eggs near Bluebell Wood.
12. Kinker's Camping Holiday – Kinker the mouse's camping holiday goes completely haywire when one freezing cold night, his tent that Stripey and Getup build gets blown over to the other side of Splashing Stream, where (earlier on) he tells Getup and Stripey in squeaks he wants to camp.
13. Timothy's Homework – Everyone from the blue Shelf helps Timothy when he suddenly gets behind with his homework for School.

=== Series 3 (1999) ===
1. The First Snowflake –
2. Getup the Skater –
3. Waiting For Santa Claus – The five toy animals are busy rushing around Timothy's house on Christmas Eve.
4. A Very Special Day – Santa Claus has been and gone for another year and the festivities begin on the animal shelf, but why is Woeful so sad about it all?
5. Living in the Jungle –
6. Little Mut's Long Rest – The five toy animals themselves are blown about on their blue shelf one windy morning as Autumn approaches. Can Mrs Mole rescue all her baby moles before it's too late?
7. Woeful and the Tooth Fairy – The remarkable animals learn the importance of keeping clean and tidy, while Timothy, the animals' young owner, awaits the arrival of the tooth fairy.
8. The Art Gallery – Timothy's painting inspires his five animal friends from the shelf to go off somewhere and paint some pictures.
9. A Lazy Afternoon –
10. Woeful's Magic Wand – Woeful's eagerness to master real magic gets him into trouble, all while a strange object appears in Timothy's bedroom.
11. Buckets and Spades – Timothy and his parents are preparing to go away on holiday, and the five toy animals are worried that for weeks on end, there will be nobody in Timothy's house to look after them. However, Gumpa has an extraordinary plan, regardless of Stripey and Getup taking a nice, quiet walk to Mr Trigg's pet shop, where the parrot lives.
12. The Jam Factory – With Timothy starting another School year, the special animals decide to make some jam, leaving Getup and Stripey up to their own eyes in fruit.
13. Gumpa Reads a Story –

=== Series 4 (2000) ===
1. Animal Watch – Woeful and the other animals learn about animals that live in a desert, including a camel, along with Timothy's guidance.
2. Timothy's Valentine Cards –
3. Gumpa's Hallowe'en Lantern –
4. The Easter Egg Hunt –
5. Gumpa's Ark – Gumpa has an extraordinary plan to save his four animal friends from a flood, including clumsy Getup.
6. The Garden Sale – The five animals find out about money as a new animal arrives on their shelf in Timothy's bedroom.
7. Looking for Big Mut – When Timothy draws his family tree, the animals themselves decide to find ancestors of their own, and Little Mut goes in search of the elusive Big Mut.
8. A Night In A Tent – A camping adventure for Timothy inspires his special and endearing animal friends to spend the night in a tent. Getup and Stripey's fun in the woods leads to a very narrow escape, and the baby moles have some extraordinary plans in store for Little Mutt.
9. The King of the Castle – Timothy's book of the "round table" and a magnificent castle inspire the special animals to have a medieval adventure with dragons, evil knights and a magic sword.
10. Timothy's Racing Car – A remote-controlled racing car arrives for Timothy, and the special animals all decide to leave their shelf before tracking it down.
11. The Shooting Star – Timothy is given a map of the stars in the night sky and lets his five animals into a secret.
12. Get Down Getup –
13. Gumpa's Head – Timothy begins a keep fit regime, but poor Gumpa just needs to take things easy.

== International broadcast ==
The series has also aired around the world including the ABC in Australia, KTV2 in Kuwait, RTÉ2 in Ireland as part of their children's block The Den, Dubai 33 in the United Arab Emirates, the children's television network K-T.V. World and M-Net (as part of their series of children's lineup blocks K-T.V.) in South Africa, Premiere 12 (as part of their children's block Kidz Blitz), Eureka Learning Channel and Kids Central in Singapore, PBS and Television Malta in Malta, TVB Pearl in Hong Kong, SVT and SVT Barnkanalen in Sweden, Wikkid Plus in Pakistan and TVNZ 2 and TVNZ 6 in New Zealand as part of their children's block Kidzone, Poland in RTL 7.

=== It's Itsy Bitsy Time ===
The series was seen on an American children's wrapper programme called It's Itsy Bitsy Time along with several TV series from overseas and aired on the Fox Family Channel in America and Treehouse TV in Canada in 1999 with the British voices being redubbed with American and Canadian voices. The voices were directed by Canadian voice actress Susan Roman who is best known for voicing Sailor Jupiter in the dubbed anime Sailor Moon. Roman also directed the American and Canadian voices for another British children's animated television series seen on It's Itsy Bitsy Time.

== Merchandise ==
The series had tie in story books from Ladybird Books, and a quintet of VHS tapes from Disney Videos between 1997 and 2001.
