= Argoed railway station =

Disused railway station in Argoed, Caerphilly

Argoed Halt

General information
- Location: Argoed, Caerphilly; Wales
- Coordinates: 51.6948°N 3.1917°W
- Grid reference: SO177001
- Platforms: 2

Other information
- Status: Disused

History
- Original company: Sirhowy Railway
- Pre-grouping: London and North Western Railway
- Post-grouping: London, Midland and Scottish Railway

Key dates
- 19 June 1865: Station opened as Argoed
- 29 September 1941: Station renamed Argoed Halt
- 13 June 1960: Station closed
Location

Argoed railway station served the village of Argoed in the County Borough of Caerphilly, Wales. it succeeded the first Argoed station built by the Sirhowy Tramroad, which operated from 1822 to 1855.

== History ==
The station was opened on 19 June 1865 by the Sirhowy Railway, upon completion of the work to convert the former Sirhowy Tramroad (a plateway of 4 ft 2 in (1,270 mm) gauge) into a standard-gauge railway. The company got into financial difficulties, and was leased to the London and North Western Railway in 1875. Therefore, it became part of the London, Midland and Scottish Railway during the Grouping of 1923. It was renamed Argoed Halt on 29 September 1941. Passing on to the Western Region of British Railways on nationalisation in 1948, it was then closed by the British Transport Commission on 13 June 1960.

== Notes ==
Preceding station	Disused railways	Following station
Blackwood	London, Midland and Scottish Railway; Sirhowy Railway	Markham Village Halt
