= Lesmahagow railway station =

Disused railway station in Lesmahagow, South Lanarkshire

Coordinates: 55.643020°N 3.887472°W

Lesmahagow

General information
- Location: Lesmahagow, South Lanarkshire; Scotland
- Platforms: 1

Other information
- Status: Disused

History
- Original company: Caledonian Railway
- Post-grouping: London, Midland and Scottish Railway; British Rail (Scottish Region)

Key dates
- 1 July 1905: Opened
- 4 October 1965: Closed
Location

Lesmahagow railway station served the town of Lesmahagow, South Lanarkshire, Scotland, from 1905 to 1965 on the Blackwood Junction to Alton Heights Junction Line.

== History ==
The station was opened on 1 July 1905 by the Caledonian Railway. On the west side of the station was the large goods yard. An option was available for a second platform but it was never built. It closed on 4 October 1965.

Preceding station	Disused railways	Following station
Blackwood; Line and station closed	Caledonian Railway; Blackwood Junction to Alton Heights Junction Line	Alton Heights Junction; Line and station closed
