= Blackwood railway station (Lanarkshire) =

Disused railway station in Blackwood, South Lanarkshire

Blackwood
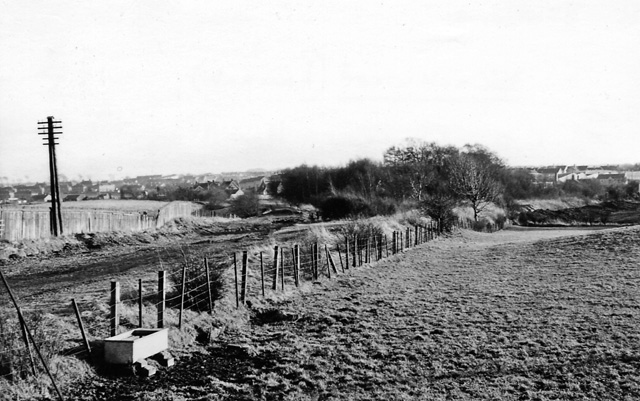
- The site of the second station, looking southeast towards Lesmahagow, in 1970

General information
- Location: Blackwood, South Lanarkshire; Scotland
- Platforms: 1

Other information
- Status: Disused

History
- Original company: Caledonian Railway
- Post-grouping: London, Midland and Scottish Railway; British Rail (Scottish Region)

Key dates
- 1 December 1866: First station opened
- 1 July 1905: First station closed and relocated
- 4 October 1965: Second station closed

Blackwood railway station served the village of Blackwood, South Lanarkshire, Scotland, from 1866 to 1965 on the Blackwood Junction to Alton Heights Junction Line.

== History ==
=== First station ===
The station was opened on 1 December 1866 by the Caledonian Railway. The station building was on the platform. The goods yard and the carriage sidings were to the west. The signal box was on the west side. In 1905 a new signal box opened, replacing the other. A new station opened on the Blackwood Junction to Alton Heights Junction line on 1 July 1905 and this station closed to passengers, but it stayed open to goods traffic until 1961.

=== Second station ===
Coordinates: 55.6691°N 3.919°W
The second station opened on 1 July 1905 by the Caledonian Railway, replacing the first site. It closed on 4 October 1965.

Preceding station	Disused railways	Following station
Terminus	Caledonian Railway; Blackwood Junction to Alton Heights Junction Line	Lesmahagow; Line and station closed
