= Geoffrey Bull =

Geoffrey Taylor Bull (24 June 1921 – 11 April 1999) was an English Christian missionary and author.

== Life ==
Bull was born in Eltham, SE London, into a family, William and Ethel, with conservative evangelical beliefs. At 15 years old, he was baptised and received into the fellowship of a group of Christians meeting in "New Testament simplicity". This group was of the Open Brethren persuasion. His original ambition for a career was to enter banking, but by 1941 he became absorbed with missionary work in Central Asia.

After World War II, the elders in his Brethren assembly agreed to commend him to work full-time in Central Asia. In March 1947, Bull and George N. Patterson (1920-2012) went to China, travelling deep into the interior up to the border area shared with Tibet. Here, for three years, they studied Mandarin and Tibetan. Bull entered Tibet on 29 July 1950, where he witnessed the last days of Tibetan independence and was soon imprisoned by the invading Red Army on the pretext of being a spy. At first, he was kept in solitary confinement, but later underwent a re-education and thought reform programme—his captors tried brainwashing, but he claimed that his "faith in Christ kept him from mental breakdown". This captivity lasted for three years and two months before he was released to the British authorities in Hong Kong on 19 December 1953.

On his return, he married Agnes(Nan) Templeton of Milngavie, Scotland, in June 1955. The Bulls spent a year in Australia, and subsequently served for fourteen months in North Borneo, now Sabah, from June 1959 to August 1960. Bull also had a worldwide Bible teaching ministry in Brethren assemblies and beyond. He died following the Breaking of Bread service in his local church, Brisbane Evangelical Church at Largs, Scotland, and was buried there. He was survived by his widow, Nan, who died in May 2009 and was buried with him. His three sons, Ross, Peter and Alister, survived him. Peter died in 2000.

== Publications ==
Bull wrote a number of books. The first three form an autobiographical trilogy on his prison experiences in China.

- Bull, Geoffrey Taylor (1955). When Iron Gates Yield. London: Hodder & Stoughton. OCLC 252091057.
- Bull, Geoffrey T. (1959). God Holds the Key. London: Hodder & Stoughton. OCLC 2899216.
- Bull, Geoffrey T. (1965). The Sky is Red. London: Hodder & Stoughton. OCLC 9059607.
- Bull, Geoffrey T. (1969). A new Pilgrim's progress: John Bunyan's classic imagined in a contemporary setting. London: Hodder & Stoughton. ISBN 978-0-340-10651-8. OCLC 59141367.
- Bull, Geoffrey T. (1962). Coral in The Sand. London: Hodder & Stoughton. OCLC 2112367.
- Bull, Geoffrey T. (1972). Love-song in harvest: an interpretation of the Book of Ruth. London: Pickering and Inglis. ISBN 978-0-7208-0219-1. OCLC 641311.
- "The Anguish in the Grass"
- "The City & The Sign" (on the Prophet Jonah)
- "'Tibetan Tales" issued in the US as "Forbidden Land, A Saga of Tibet"
- "Treasure in My Sack"
- "The Rock and the Sand" this was his last work and was published by Chapter Two, London.

=== Children's board books ===
Bull also wrote three series of illustrated board books for children, the text being in rhyming verse and retells various Bible stories:

'I am' series

'I hid' series

'I wish I lived' series

- Bull, Geoffrey T.; Christopher Higham (1977). I wish I lived when Daniel did. London: Pickering and Inglis. ISBN 978-0-7208-2249-6. OCLC 16360438.
- Bull, Geoffrey T.; Christopher Higham (1977). I Wish I Lived When Esther Did. London: Pickering and Inglis.
- Bull, Geoffrey T.; Christopher Higham (1977). I Wish I Lived When Gideon Did. London: Pickering and Inglis.ISBN 0-87508-889-9
