= Sirhowy railway station =

Former railway station in Wales

General information
- Location: Sirhowy, Tredegar, Blaenau Gwent; Wales
- Coordinates: 51.7805°N 3.2440°W
- Grid reference: SO142097
- Platforms: 2

Other information
- Status: Disused

History
- Original company: Sirhowy Railway
- Pre-grouping: London and North Western Railway
- Post-grouping: London, Midland and Scottish Railway

Key dates
- 19 June 1865: Station opened
- 13 June 1960: Station closed to passengers
- 4 November 1963: Station and line closed to goods
Location

Sirhowy railway station was a station on the Sirhowy Railway. It served Sirhowy north of Tredegar at the head of the Sirhowy Valley in South East Wales.

== History ==
The station was opened on 19 June 1865 by the Sirhowy Railway after the conversion of the Sirhowy Tramroad to a standard gauge railway. It was closed to passenger traffic on 13 June 1960. The line from Sirhowy to Tredegar continued in operation for goods traffic until its closure on 4 November 1963.

== Present day ==
The route has been reused by the modern A4048 road; there are no remains of the station at the site.

== Route ==
Preceding station	Disused railways	Following station
Nantybwch	London, Midland and Scottish Railway; Sirhowy Railway	Tredegar
