= Meg Patterson =

Scottish surgeon (1922–2002)

Meg Patterson MBE
- Born: Margaret Angus Ingram; 9 November 1922; Aberdeen, Scotland
- Died: 25 July 2002 (aged 79); Lanark, Scotland
- Education: University of Aberdeen (MBChB); University of Edinburgh (MD)
- Occupation: surgeon
- Known for: Neuro-electric therapy
- Relatives: George Patterson

Margaret Angus Patterson (9 November 1922 – 25 July 2002) was a Scottish surgeon and medical missionary who developed a method for treating drug addiction she called "neuro-electric therapy" (NET). While the therapy gained public attention through celebrity endorsements, it was met with skepticism by the medical community due to a lack of formal evidence. Some modern clinical trials have found that a device based on her principles is effective for reducing opioid withdrawal symptoms.

== Early life and education ==
Margaret Angus Ingram was born in Aberdeen, Scotland, in 1922. The daughter of Alexander Ingram, she was the youngest of five children. Patterson started medical school at 21 during World War II, and qualified as a member Fellowship of the Royal Colleges of Surgeons when she was 25, the only woman in the group.

== Career ==
Patterson went to India as a medical missionary. While in India she met George Patterson in Kalimpong and they married in 1953; the couple were committed Christians. George Patterson had become famous through his involvement with the Dalai Lama, and his reporting on the 1959 Tibetan uprising and the subsequent events in China's annexation of Tibet. For her work establishing and expanding clinics in India she was awarded the MBE in 1961.

In 1964, she moved to Hong Kong with her husband, where she was appointed surgeon-in-charge at Tung Wah Hospital. They remained in Hong Kong until 1973.

In 1972, other doctors in Hong Kong, H.L. Wen and S.Y.C. Cheung, published their work on electroacupuncture for treatment of addiction. Patterson adopted their method, developing a technique called "neuro-electric therapy" (NET), replacing the acupuncture needles with electrodes, making this a form of cranial electrotherapy stimulation. On returning to the UK she and her husband collaborated to popularise the technique, which became popular with rock and pop stars.

The medical and scientific community was skeptical about the technique. Patterson found herself building clinics with minimal funding, much as she had in India.

In 1974, Patterson treated Eric Clapton for heroin addiction.

In 1976, Patterson set up a clinic in Broadhurst Manor, East Sussex, funded by the Robert Stigwood Organisation. Donors misleadingly marketed the clinic as "a cure for heroin addiction", which it was not. In 1981, funding ran out and she moved the clinic to California.

A 1986 article in New Scientist said that the medical establishment viewed Patterson as a quack for trying to remove addiction with tiny electrical currents, and that one clinical trial found it to be ineffective. People magazine said there was "disbelief and even hostility from Britain's medical establishment and from the US medical world".

== Death and legacy ==
In 1999, Patterson had a major stroke a week after opening a clinic in Tijuana. In 2001, she and her husband returned to Scotland, where she died on 25 July 2002. She was survived by her husband, a daughter, two sons, and five grandchildren.

Following Meg Patterson's death, researchers continued her work, focusing on modern validation of the protocol. Her husband and her son Lorne continued marketing the NET technique. Evidence reviewed within NHS Scotland found no substantial evidence that neuro-electric therapy was helpful in treating opiate addiction.

A trial design to assess the efficacy of NET as a treatment for opioid use disorder was published in Frontiers in Psychiatry in 2022. This research led to the development of a transcutaneous alternating current stimulator (tACS), which received FDA clearance in 2024 for use with patients in opioid withdrawal.

A follow-up study published in 2025 examined post-discharge outcomes among patients who received NET Device monotherapy during residential opioid detoxification. The study reported lower rates of opioid and psychostimulant use over a three-month period among participants who received active stimulation for more than 24 hours, compared with control conditions. The authors noted that the findings were based on secondary analyses and recommended further independent replication.

== Awards and honours ==
- MBE, 1961

== See also ==
- Electrotherapy
- Cranial electrotherapy stimulation
