= Blackwood railway station (Wales) =

Disused railway station in Blackwood, Caerphilly

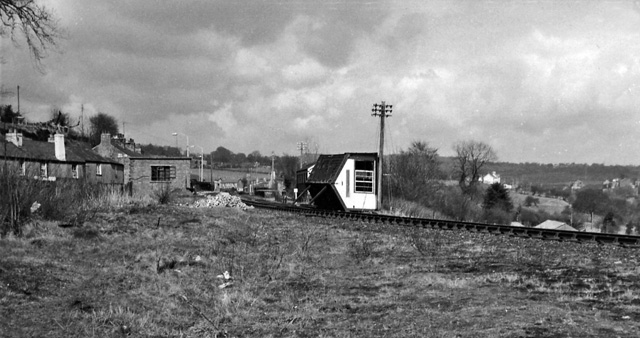
- The remains of Blackwood station in April 1965, looking south towards Nine Mile Point. The remnants of the signal box can be seen on its side.

General information
- Location: Blackwood, Caerphilly; Wales
- Coordinates: 51.6727°N 3.1939°W
- Grid reference: ST 175 977
- Platforms: 2

Other information
- Status: Disused

History
- Original company: Sirhowy Railway
- Pre-grouping: London and North Western Railway
- Post-grouping: London, Midland and Scottish Railway

Key dates
- 19 June 1865: Station opened
- 13 June 1960: Station closed to passengers
- 8 February 1965: Station closed to goods
Location

Blackwood railway station (Welsh: Y Coed Duon) was a station on the Sirhowy Railway. It served the town of Blackwood, Caerphilly.

== History ==
The station opened on 19 June 1865 by the Sirhowy Railway after the conversion of the Sirhowy Tramroad to a standard gauge railway. The station had a signal box, which was eventually destroyed. Due to competition from bus services in the area, the station met its demise to passenger services on 13 June 1960, though the last train ran on the 11th. Goods traffic ceased on 8 February 1965.

== Present day ==
Almost nothing of the station and route currently exists. The National Cycle Network route 467 between Blackwood and Hollybush follows a lot of former trackbed of the railway.

== Route ==
Preceding station	Disused railways	Following station
Pontllanfraith High Level	London, Midland and Scottish Railway; Sirhowy Railway	Argoed
