= Auchlochan Platform railway station =

Railway station in Auchlochan, South Lanarkshire, Scotland

Coordinates: 55.60012°N 3.87802°W

Auchlochan

General information
- Location: Auchlochan, South Lanarkshire; Scotland
- Platforms: 1

Other information
- Status: Disused

History
- Original company: Caledonian Railway
- Pre-grouping: Caledonian Railway
- Post-grouping: London Midland and Scottish Railway

Key dates
- 1907: Station opens
- 4 October 1965: Station closes
Location

Auchlochan Platform railway station served Auchlochan, a village in the county of South Lanarkshire, Scotland. It was served by local trains on the Coalburn Branch south of Glasgow.

== History ==
Opened by the Caledonian Railway, the station became part of the London Midland and Scottish Railway as a result of the Grouping of 1923. It was in the Scottish Region of British Railways after nationalisation in 1948. The British Railways Board closed the station in 1965.

== The site today ==
The platform has been removed but the alignment of the line and a level crossing gate show its location.

== See also ==
- Auchlochan Collieries

Preceding station	Historical railways	Following station
Alton Heights Junction	Caledonian Railway; Coalburn Branch	Coalburn
