= George Patterson (missionary) =

Scottish engineer and missionary

George N. Patterson
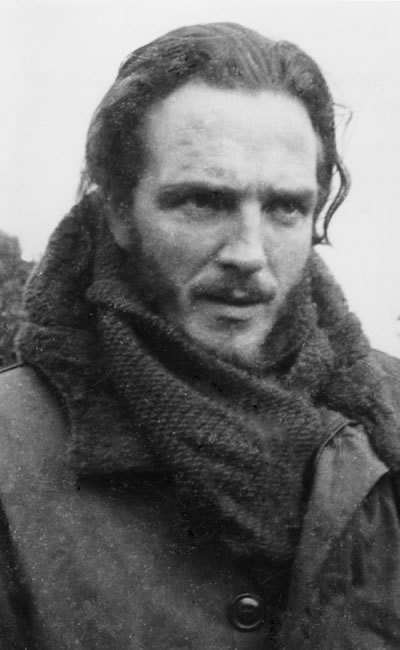
- Born: 19 August 1920; Falkirk, Scotland
- Died: 28 December 2012 (aged 92); Auchlochan, Scotland
- Spouse: Meg Patterson

George Neilson Patterson (born 19 August 1920 in Falkirk, died at Auchlochan, Lesmahagow, 28 December 2012) also known as Khampa Gyau (bearded Khampa in Tibetan) and Patterson of Tibet, was a Scottish engineer and missionary who served as medical officer and diplomatic representative of the Tibetan resistance movement during the Annexation of Tibet by the People's Republic of China as well as their liaison with the United States government and the Central Intelligence Agency.

He was married to the surgeon Meg Patterson.

== Early life and education ==
Patterson was born on 19 August 1920 in Redding, Falkirk, Scotland and grew up in Laurieston, where he was a member of the Plymouth Brethren. His father, George Neilson Patterson, was a coal miner and socialist, and Patterson had two younger siblings. When he was 11 years old, he suffered a bicycle accident, and because of the head injuries he sustained, he dropped out of school two years later. Patterson entered a vocational program with Carron Company, becoming a tool setter of machine presses by the age of 17. During World War II, he was involved in weapons manufacturing, frequently working 12-hour shifts every day of the week. As the war ended in 1945, Patterson was inspired by Sven Hedin's book Trans-Himalaya and a religious calling from God to move to Tibet. He subsequently donated all of his money away and completed a one-year program at the Missionary School of Medicine in London.

== Letter of Remembrance ==
The International Campaign for Tibet awarded him their Light of Truth Award on 25 March 2011. In a letter presented with the award, a simple butter-lamp symbolizing the light the recipient has shed on the cause of Tibet, the Dalai Lama's Special Envoy Lodi Gyaltsen Gyari said: "It is my honour to convey to you in writing the decision of the Board of the International Campaign for Tibet to award you the Light of Truth, the highest recognition in the Tibet world of service to Tibet. The Board of Directors, chaired by Mr. Richard Gere, took the unanimous decision with great enthusiasm and, on their behalf, I offer you heartfelt congratulations. It gives me added pleasure as a Khampa to be the person to officially bring this news to you, Khampa Gyau ['bearded Khampa'], the name by which His Holiness the Dalai Lama fondly and humorously called you."

== Publications ==
- Patterson, George Neilson (1952). Tibetan Journey. UK: Faber & Faber.
- Patterson, George Neilson (1954). God's Fool. United States: Doubleday.
- Patterson, George Neilson (1956). Up and Down Asia.
- Patterson, George Neilson (1958). Tragic Destiny.
- Patterson, George Neilson (1960). Tibet in Revolt.
- Patterson, George Neilson (April 1963). Peking Versus Delhi. United States: Praeger.
- Patterson, George Neilson (May 1964). The Unquiet Frontier. United States: Dragonfly Paperbacks.
- Patterson, George Neilson (1968). Christianity in Communist China. United States: Word.
- Patterson, George Neilson (1983). Christianity and Marxism. UK: Paternoster Press.
- Patterson, George Neilson (1990). Requiem For Tibet. London, UK: Aurum Press. ISBN 9781854101112.
- Patterson, George Neilson (1990). The China Paradox - Christ Versus Marx. UK: Word Books.
- Patterson, George Neilson. Patterson of Tibet. United States: Promotion Publishing.

== Joint publications ==
=== with Meg Patterson ===
- Patterson, George Neilson (1975). Addictions Can Be Cured. UK: Lion.
- Patterson, George Neilson (1983). Getting Off The Hook: Addictions can be cured by NET (neuroelectric therapy). Wheaton, Illinois: Harold Shaw. ISBN 978-0-87788-305-0.
- Patterson, George Neilson (1987). The Power Factor. UK: Word.
- Patterson, George Neilson (1994). The Paradise Factor. UK: Word.

== Contributor ==
- editor Klatt, Werner (1965). The Chinese Problem. OUP & HKUP.
- editor Wint, Guy (September 1966). Asia Handbook. Anthony Blond; Penguin.

== Documentaries ==
=== Advisor and scriptwriter ===
- 1964: Raid into Tibet with Adrian Cowell and Chris Menges
- 1970 Chasing the Dragon
- 1980 Synanon

== See also ==
- Geoffrey Bull
