= Bankend railway station =

Former Scottish railway station

Bankend

General information
- Location: Bankend, South Lanarkshire; Scotland
- Coordinates: 55.5803°N 3.9063°W
- Platforms: 1

Other information
- Status: Disused

History
- Original company: Caledonian Railway
- Pre-grouping: Caledonian Railway
- Post-grouping: London, Midland and Scottish Railway

Key dates
- 1920: open for workmen
- July 1926: Station closes
Location
- Location within South Lanarkshire Location within Scotland

Bankend railway station served Bankend, a village in South Lanarkshire, Scotland. It was opened for workmen around 1920 and closed in 1926 after which the area became an opencast coal mine.

Preceding station	Historical railways	Following station
Coalburn	Caledonian Railway; Coalburn Branch	Terminus
