= Coalburn railway station =

Former Scottish railway station

Coordinates: 55.5901°N 3.8885°W

Coalburn

General information
- Location: Coalburn, South Lanarkshire; Scotland
- Platforms: 1

Other information
- Status: Disused

History
- Original company: Caledonian Railway
- Pre-grouping: Caledonian Railway
- Post-grouping: London, Midland and Scottish Railway

Key dates
- 1 November 1891: Station opens
- 4 October 1965: Station closes
Location

Coalburn railway station served Coalburn, a village in South Lanarkshire, Scotland. It opened in 1891 and was closed in 1965.

Preceding station	Historical railways	Following station
Auchlochan Platform	Caledonian Railway; Coalburn Branch	Bankend
