= Caledonian Railway branches in South Lanarkshire =

Former railway lines in Scotland

This article traces the Caledonian Railway branches in South Lanarkshire.

South Lanarkshire contained a huge resource of coal reserves, and the collieries needed an efficient transport medium to get the mineral to market. The Caledonian Railway, in association with friendly independent promoters, generated a network of lines in South Lanarkshire. New lines were constructed right up to 1905, but in the subsequent decades the coal extraction declined and the railway activity with it.

The lines progressively closed completely, with the sole exceptions of the Lanark branch line, and the twenty-first century re-opening of the Larkhall branch.

The geographical scope of this article is the area south of the Hamilton—Motherwell—Carstairs line, as far south-west as Darvel and Muirkirk.

== History ==
=== The main line ===
The Caledonian Railway was formed by the Caledonian Railway Act 1845 (8 & 9 Vict. c. clxii) on 31 July 1845. Its capital was £1,800,000, at that time a huge sum. There had been a long struggle to get approval for a main line linking central Scotland with the growing English railway network, at Carlisle. The chief difficulty had been designing a route over the difficult terrain of the Southern Uplands, that would be within the capabilities of the locomotives of the time.

The main line was opened between Carlisle and Beattock on 10 September 1847, and from Beattock to Glasgow on 15 February 1848. A second main line from Carstairs to Edinburgh was opened on 1 April 1848.

Lanark was an important town at that time, having a population of 7672 in 1831, and the cotton mills of New Lanark were long established. However the topography around the town, particularly the steep valley of the River Clyde and the tributary Mouse Water, and the hills surrounding the town, prevented a practical alignment of the main line through Lanark itself. A "Lanark" station was provided, about 2 miles (3 km) north-east of the town; the station later became Cleghorn station.

=== A branch line for Lanark ===
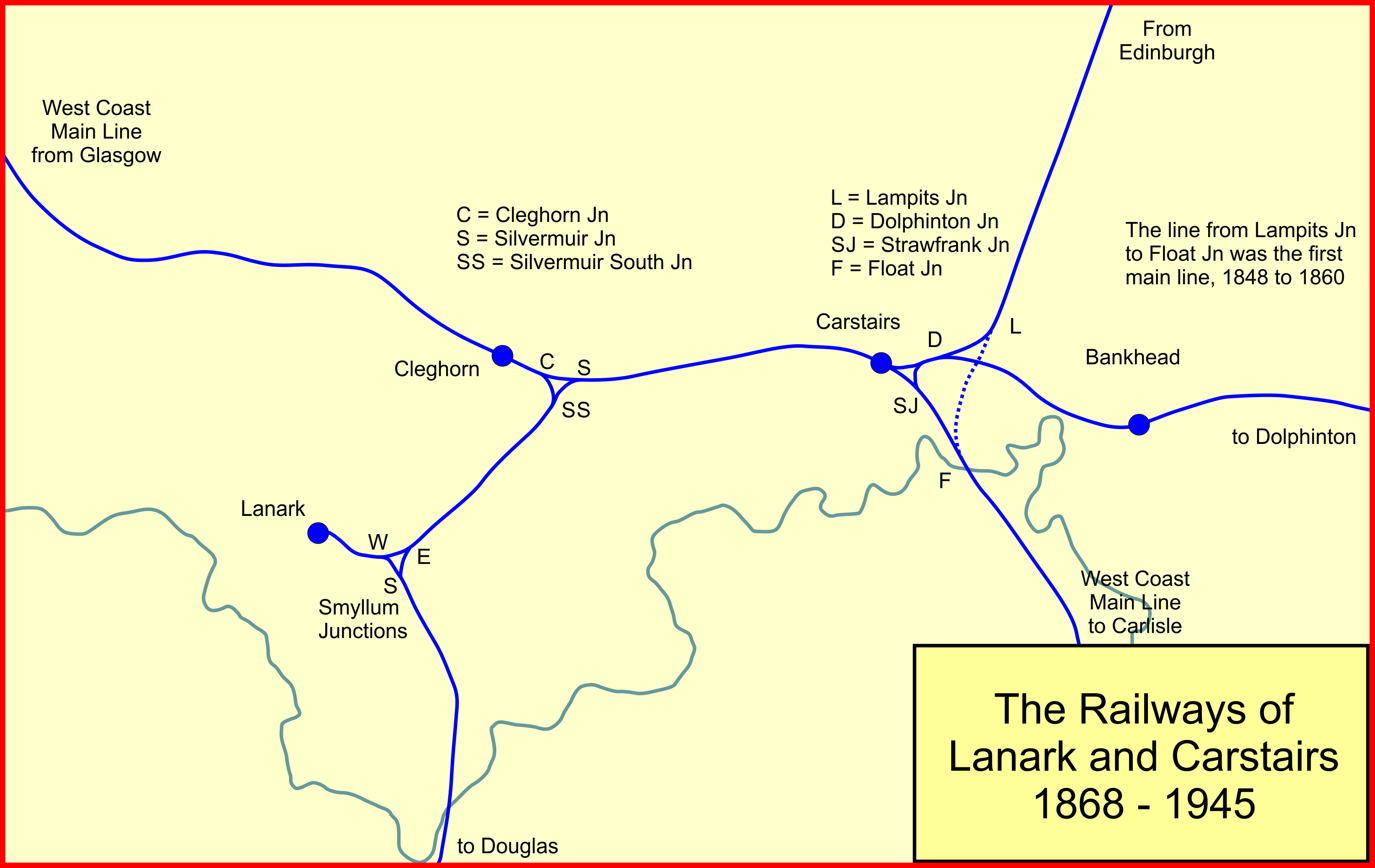
The railways of Lanark and Carstairs

Local interests decided to rectify the omission of Lanark from the railway network, and in November 1852 the Lanark Branch Railway Company was formed and a provisional Committee appointed. The committee included James Baird, MP and John Marr, Provost of Lanark. The capital required to build the line was £6,000. The landowners on the proposed route all consented to sell the necessary land and no act of Parliament was sought. (Note: The absence of an authorising act of Parliament was unusual; for example the Lanark to Ravenstruther road had to be altered where it crossed the alignment. However Ross, Carter, Awdry and Millar make no reference to an act as they do for other lines, which appears to support Lanark Museum's assertion, which is also made by Paterson. (Millar states "Lanark etc branches authorised 1851" without indicating what form of authorisation that signifies.))

The Caledonian was friendly to the little company, and worked the line when it was opened on 5 January 1855. (Note: Millar states opened for goods December 1854, for passengers 5 June 1855.) The junction with the main line, named Cleghorn Junction, was aligned for through running from Glasgow to Lanark. The branch was a single line.

The Lanark Branch Railway was purchased by the Caledonian Railway on 23 July 1860 and became an integral part of the Caledonian system.

=== Motherwell to Lesmahagow and Coalburn ===
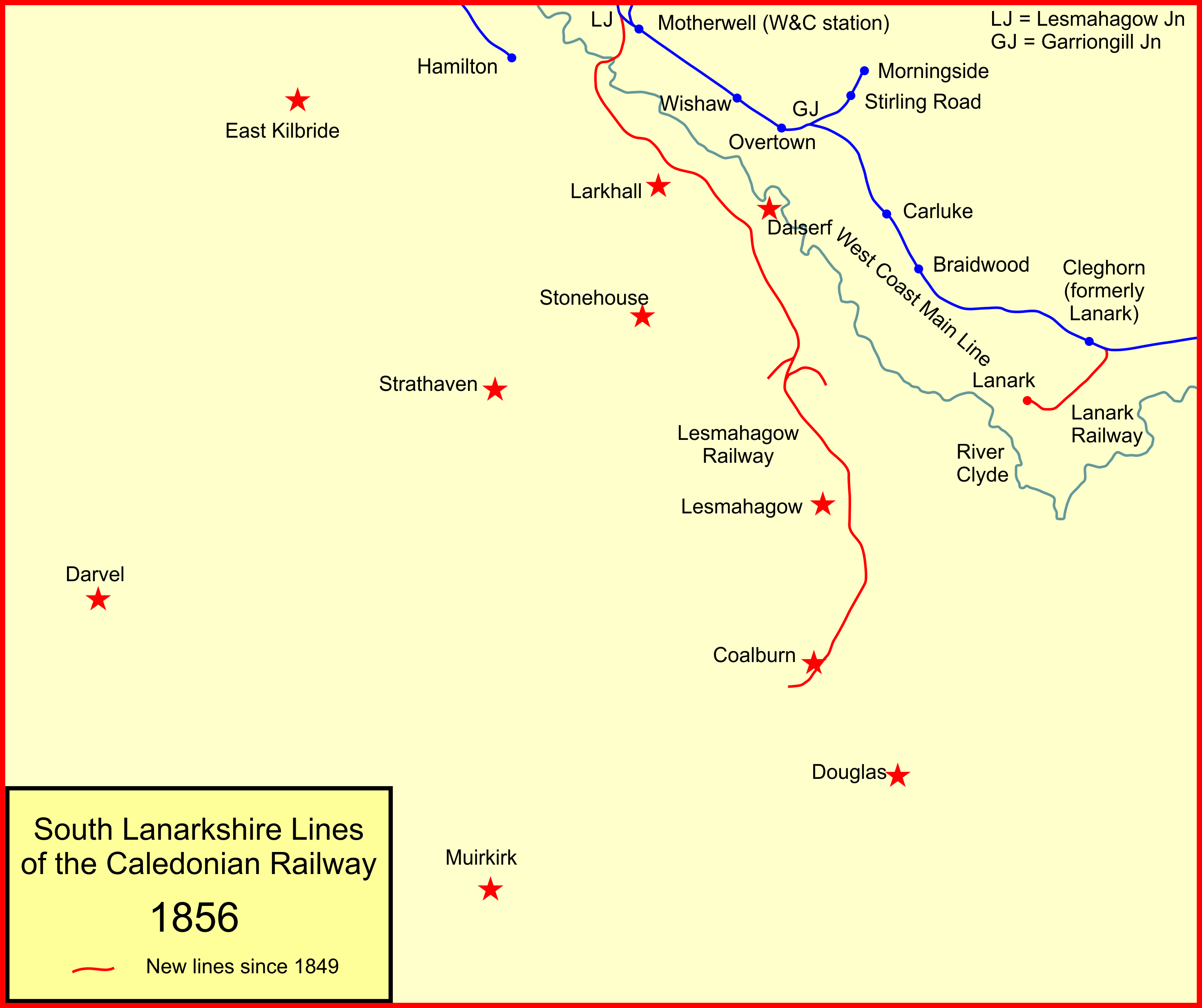
South Lanarkshire Railways in 1856

The original purpose of the Caledonian had been the carriage of passengers and goods over long distances, but during the lengthy period before the opening of the main line, the mineral potential of the lands around the Caledonian route became significant. This was enhanced by the flourishing iron industry in the Monklands and elsewhere, which generated a demand for coal and iron ore. The minerals were readily available, and all that was needed was cheap transport.

In 1846 a branch line to collieries in Lesmahagow and Coalburn had been proposed; 63 million tons of workable coal deposits were believed to exist, and the Caledonian Railway (Lesmahagow Branches) Act 1847 (10 & 11 Vict. c. xxiv) authorising its construction was obtained, but the financial slump of that period, and the serious financial difficulties in which the Caledonian found itself, prevented raising the money to build the line. There was considerable demand for the line, and on 24 July 1851 fresh powers to build it were obtained in the Caledonian Railways (Lesmahagow Branches) Act 1851 (14 & 15 Vict. c. xcix). The line, called the Lesmahagow Railway, was constructed and it opened on 1 December 1856; it was substantially financed by the coal owners themselves; without a railway, the transport of the coal to market was unaffordable. The Edinburgh and Glasgow Railway and the Glasgow and South Western Railway (G&SWR) both hoped to build lines to serve the area, and the struggle, ending with an owning company friendly to the Caledonian, was a close run thing.

The line ran from Lesmahagow Junction at Motherwell, on the Clydesdale Junction line; Lesmahagow Junction is the main junction at Motherwell station today, although at that time the Motherwell station was further east, on the Wishaw and Coltness line. The new line ran south, crossing the Clyde, then near Larkhall and Dalserf, crossing the River Nethan there, passing to the east of Lesmahagow and through Coalburn, and terminating at Bankend Colliery a little south of Coalburn.

In 1860 the Lesmahagow Railway was taken over by the Caledonian Railway, guaranteed terms on the capital being allocated to the original proprietors.

The line was challenging in engineering terms, as the terrain was difficult, and high viaducts were necessary over the Clyde (at Ferniegair) and the Nethan valley. They were constructed in laminated timber arches. The design was not successful, and they were reconstructed in iron girder form in 1861—1862 after structural failure.

=== Extensions to the Lesmahagow line; and passenger traffic ===
Caledonian Railway (Stonehouse Branch) Act 1861
- Act of Parliament
- Parliament of the United Kingdom
- Long title: An Act to enable the Caledonian Railway Company to make a Branch Railway from their Lesmahagow Line to Cot Castle near Stonehouse; to extend the Southfield Branch of that Line; to enlarge their Station at Symington; and for other Purposes.
- Citation: 24 & 25 Vict. c. ccxxviii

Dates
- Royal assent: 1 August 1861

Further pits required to be served, and on 1 September 1862 a new mineral branch was opened from Ayr Road Junction (near Dalserf) to collieries at Canderside, near Stonehouse. There was also a short branch to Blackwood from Southfield Junction, near Tillietudlem, also opened on 1 September 1862, and to Little Gill Colliery from Auchenheath.

On 1 September 1864 the Canderside line was further extended to ironstone pits at Cot Castle, a short distance south west of Stonehouse.

These lines had been opened as single track mineral railways; the Caledonian Railway had taken them over and on 11 May 1863 it obtained authorisation to run passenger trains and to double the main line between Motherwell and Southfield Junction. The doubling was complete by 1 November 1864, and passenger traffic started between Ferniegair and Brocketsbrae (Lesmahagow), Blackwood and Stonehouse on 1 December 1866. At this time the Motherwell station was the old Wishaw and Coltness station, further east, and the link from Motherwell to Hamilton had not yet been built. If passenger trains had been run from Ferniegair to Glasgow they could not have made a passenger call at Motherwell, so Ferniegair was a terminus, from which a horse omnibus took passengers to Motherwell or Hamilton. For the Blackwood branch, a coach was detached from the main train at Southfield Junction, (Note: Stansfield refers to this as Blackwood Junction.) and for a time was hauled to Blackwood by horses.

On 1 April 1868 the line was opened to passengers between Ferniegair and Lesmahagow Junction; a Motherwell station was provided on the Lesmahagow line, (Note: Ross, page 103, citing Quick; but on page 73 he says February 1871.) and passenger trains ran through to Glasgow, Buchanan Street. The Motherwell station was close to the site of the Hamilton line platforms at the present-day Motherwell station. The passenger train service from Ferniegair towards Motherwell ceased from 2 October 1876.

A passenger service was introduced on the Coalburn branch from 2 November 1891. There was a workers' platform at Bankend for colliers at Dalquhand and Bankend collieries.

=== Hamilton to Strathaven ===
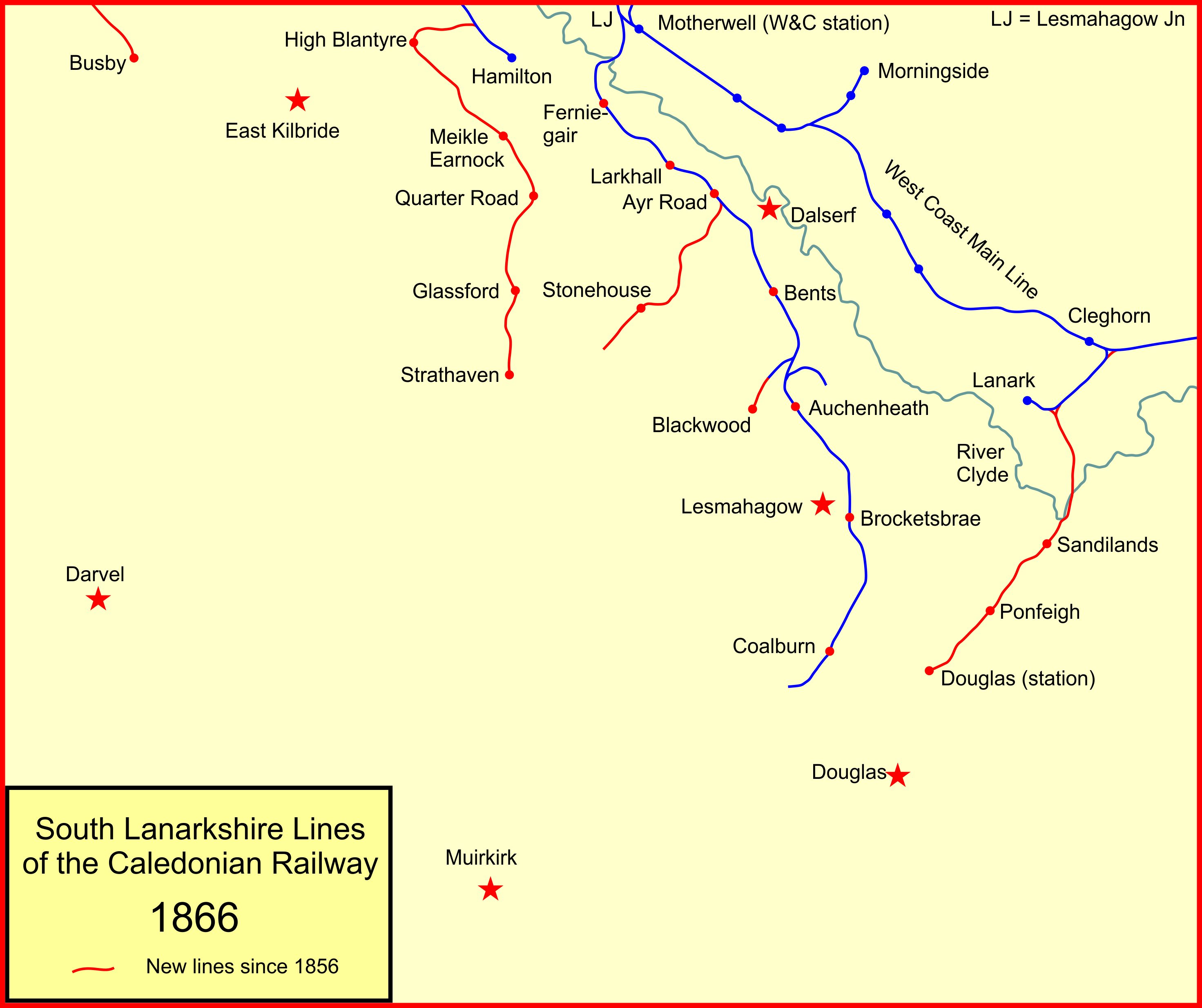
The railways of South Lanarkshire in 1866

More mining activity was going on elsewhere in the region, and there were mines in the hills south of Hamilton that required to be connected. The topography of the area made that difficult to reach from the Lesmahagow line, and the new line would have to leave the Hamilton line, and even there it would have to face the Hamilton terminus. At the time there was no direct link between the old Hamilton (later Hamilton West) station and Lesmahagow Junction.

The townspeople of Strathaven needed a railway connection too, but at first there was not enough money available to pay for the extra route. The Caledonian Railway agreed to supply some of the shortfall. The Hamilton and Strathaven Railway was authorised by the Hamilton and Strathaven Railway Act 1857 (20 & 21 Vict. c. cxxviii) on 10 August 1857, with authorised capital of £70,000. It opened for mineral trains from Hamilton to Quarter ironworks on 6 August 1860. The line was extended from Quarter Junction (a short distance north of the ironworks) to Strathaven on 16 June 1862. (Note: Paterson quotes on page 159 the authorisation date of the Strathaven lines as 10 August 1857, and this is also quoted by Carter. Paterson says that the extension from Quarter opened on 1 December 1862. He also consistently refers in this section to Haughhead Junction as being the point of divergence of the line near Hamilton, but this is a mistake: it was Strathaven Junction, sometimes spelt Strathavon Junction. Haughhead Junction was the later apex of the triangle at Ross Junction, nearest Hamilton, opened in 1876.) Construction costs considerably exceeded estimates, and the Caledonian agreed to take over the line and make up the shortfall. Passenger operation started on 2 February 1863, and the Caledonian takeover was authorised by the Caledonian and Hamilton and Strathaven Railway Amalgamation Act 1864 (27 & 28 Vict. c. ccl) of 25 July 1864.

A connection from Quarter Junction to a colliery at Eddlewood was made some time after the opening.

Passing through high country, the line was single at first although progressively doubled later: to Meikle Earnock on 11 January 1875 and to Quarter Road on 35 March 1875. It reverted to single track beyond Quarter when the Lesmahagow connecting lines were opened later.

=== From Lanark to Douglas ===
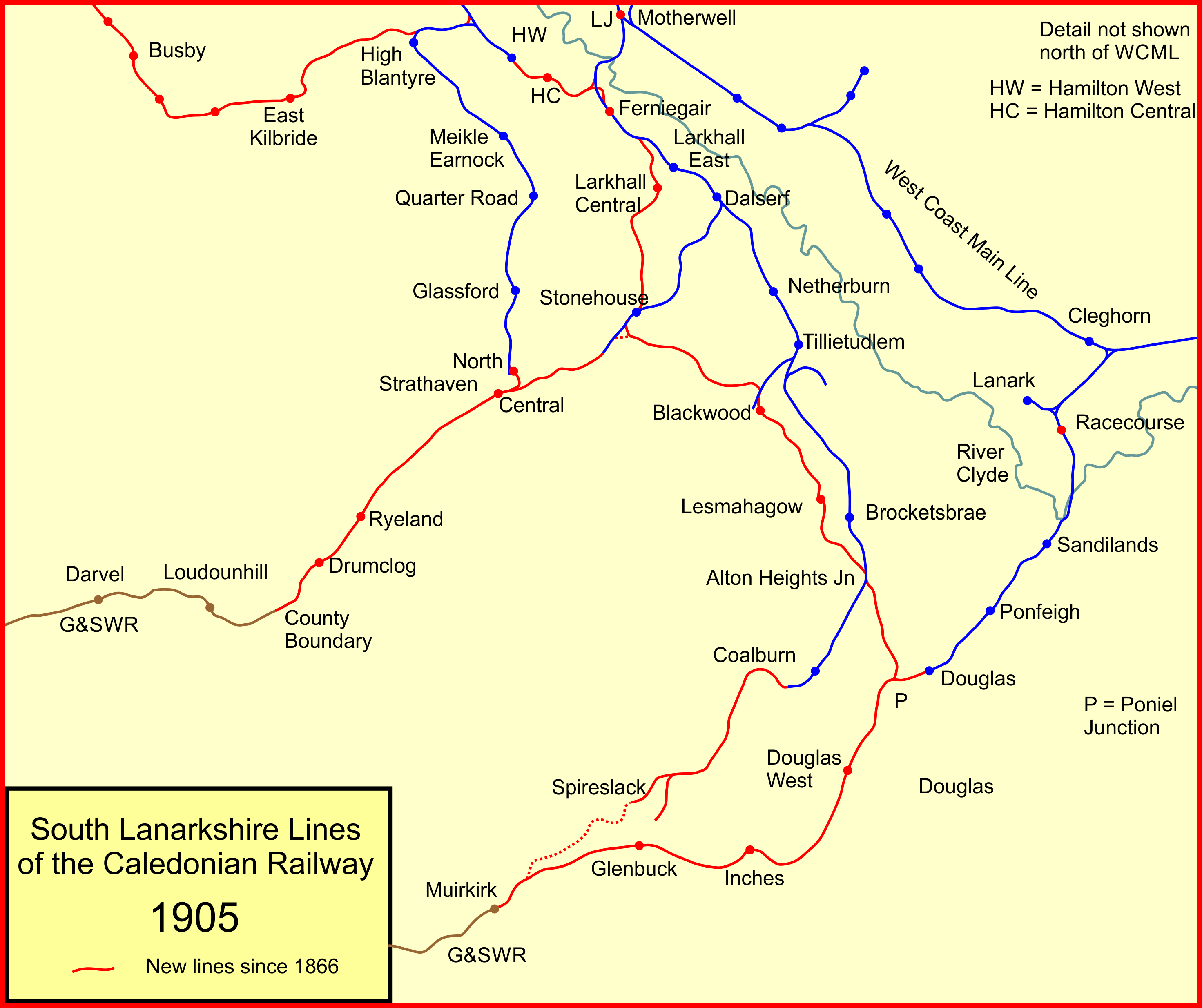
The railways of South Lanarkshire in 1905

There were known to be large coal deposits in the hills south-west of Lanark, and on 23 July 1860 the Caledonian Railway obtained the Caledonian Railway (Branches) Act 1860 (23 & 24 Vict. c. cxliv) authorising them to build onwards from Lanark. The act refers to the Lanark Railway, and refers to "branches to Lanark and to the Douglas coalfield". Of course the original Lanark branch was already in place and operational. The act authorised a triangular junction with the Lanark branch, not far from the terminus station, leading south-westwards to Ponfeigh and Douglas. Share capital specific to this scheme was £100,000.

The Caledonian also constructed a south curve at Cleghorn, enabling through running from Carstairs towards Lanark and Douglas. The south curve was double track, and for the time being the Glasgow direction curve at Cleghorn was single line only. (Note: Contemporary Ordnance Survey plans show this, but there is some unreliability around the dates of the surveys; the six-inch plan shows the full triangle, with single track on the Glasgow spur and double track on the Carstairs spur; its legend states that it was surveyed in 1858-1859 and published in 1864, but it shows the Douglas branch from Lanark, which opened in 1864.)

The Douglas branch and the spurs opened on 1 April 1864. Douglas station was a considerable distance from the town it served.

=== On from Douglas to Muirkirk ===
The Glasgow, Paisley, Kilmarnock and Ayr Railway (later reorganised to form the Glasgow and South Western Railway (G&SWR), had reached Muirkirk in 1848; the town had become a huge centre of the iron industry, dominated by the Baird ironworks, and the Caledonian hoped one day to reach it by building on from Douglas.

Although mineral extraction did develop around Douglas station, the area was not the centre of mining that had been assumed, and onward extension to Muirkirk was considered essential; on 1 January 1873 that was accomplished, meeting the G&SWR by an end-on junction there. The G&SWR formed a short eastward extension from the Muirkirk passenger station to the point of junction, keeping primacy of access to the ironworks internal private railway network. Caledonian passenger trains ran over this G&SWR extension to reach the station.

A through passenger service from Ayr to Edinburgh over the route had long been contemplated, but the Caledonian considered the mineral traffic to be the priority, and did not start local passenger operation until 1 June 1874. A through Ayr to Edinburgh service finally started on in 1878; it was not successful and was soon discontinued.

=== Hamilton and Motherwell ===
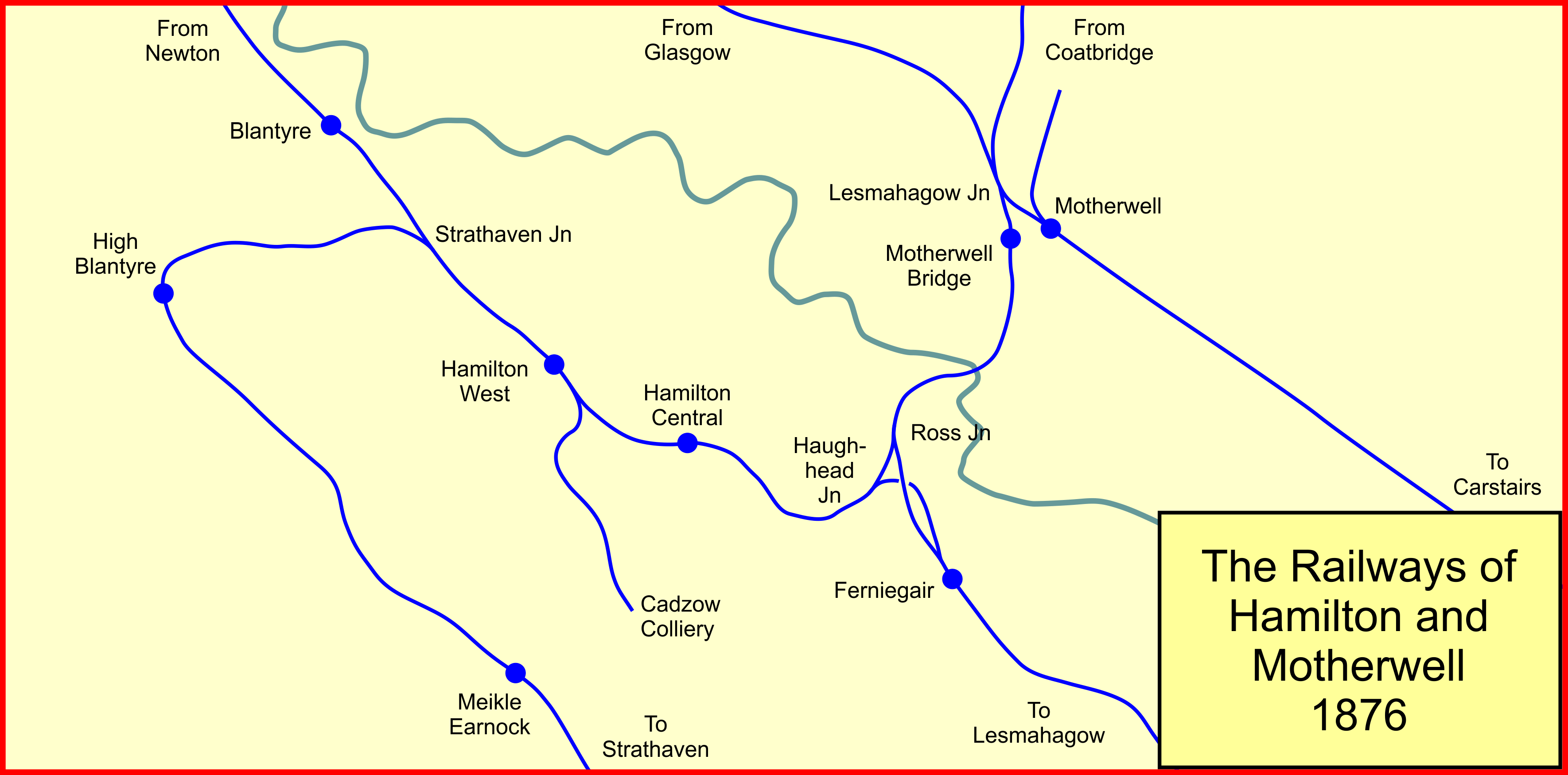
The railways of Hamilton and Motherwell in 1876

The original Hamilton branch of the Clydesdale Junction Railway terminated at what is now Hamilton West station. The Lesmahagow Railway left Motherwell and headed south, and there was a gap between the two sections. In 1876 a line was built from the Hamilton terminus to a junction with the Lesmahagow line at Ross Junction; it opened on 23 September 1876, passenger services starting on 2 October 1876. A triangular junction was provided at Ross Junction: trains from Hamilton to Lesmahagow left the Ross Junction line at Haughhead Junction and joined the Lesmahagow line at Ferniegair Junction. Ferniegair station was relocated south of the new junction; the old station had had a passenger service to Motherwell since 1868. It now also had trains to South Side station in Glasgow via Hamilton.

The mineral activity grew considerably and numerous pits were operating close to the Caledonian routes. A marshalling yard was built at Ross Junction, and the yard had become an important traffic centre for the mineral trains. The density of this slow traffic was such as to cause considerable congestion, and on 1 May 1882 a west curve was opened at Blantyre, enabling Strathaven trains to run directly towards Glasgow. The short curve ran from Auchenraith Junction to Blantyre.

=== Blantyre and East Kilbride ===
The Busby Railway had been opened in 1866, connecting the town to Glasgow; in 1868 it had been extended to East Kilbride. In 1882 the Caledonian Railway bought out the company, and set about building a connecting line from East Kilbride to a junction at Hunthill, near High Blantyre. The connection there faced the triangular junction that had just been formed at Auchenraith, giving additional flexibility for mineral trains from the South Lanarkshire lines to General Terminus and other terminals in Glasgow: the line opened in 1883. Passenger traffic was contemplated on the line, but this never developed and passenger operation ceased in 1914.

=== Alton Heights ===
The Coalburn line and the Douglas line were within 3 miles (5 km) of one another near Lesmahagow. The Douglas line led to Lanark, so that the route for mineral traffic to Glasgow was circuitous. In 1883 a connecting line was laid in between the two, from Poneil Junction to Alton Heights Junction. (Note: The locality is spelt Auldtonheights nowadays.) This gave coal trains from the Douglas area considerably shorter route to the yards at Ross Junction.

=== Dunduff Quarry ===
In 1894 a short extension was opened from Blackwood to Dunduff Quarry. Never intended for passenger operation, it by-passed the extensive station facilities at Blackwood itself.

=== Spireslack ===
By 1890 the Baird ironworks had built a private mineral railway at Muirkirk to get access to pits at Glenbuck, north-east of the town.

The Caledonian obtained the Caledonian Railway Act 1896 (59 & 60 Vict. c. clx), for branches connecting Strathaven, Stonehouse and Muirkirk. Requiring construction through exceptionally difficult terrain, the proposal was plainly designed to fend off intended incursions by the G&SWR and a new independent company. This was a Pyrrhic victory, for Parliament granted the G&SWR running powers over the line. The line was built from Auldhouseburn Junction, immediately east of Muirkirk, crossing over the Baird ironworks line, followed by a viaduct over the River Ayr, climbing into moorland with another viaduct over the Ponesk Burn and a third over the Stottenclugh Burn at Glenbuck, to Spireslack Colliery. The line continued north-eastward through even more desolate terrain, finally reaching the 1856 Coalburn branch at Bankend colliery, where the mining activity had developed considerably in the intervening 40 years.

Giving evidence at the parliamentary hearing for the bill, the assistant general manager of the Caledonian stated that the purpose of the line was to link the Coalburn coalfield more closely with the G&SWR system. If this assertion can be taken at face value, it may mean that access for Coalburn coal to Ayrshire ports for export would be possible.

In fact although completed and fully signalled, the line was never opened between Spireslack and Muirkirk, so that Spireslack Colliery and the nearby Galawhistle Colliery were at the southern extremity, served from Lesmahagow. That portion of the line opened to mineral traffic in 1896. Spireslack was sometimes spelt Spyreslack. Stansfield suggests that the line was not opened because the Caledonian did not wish to let the G&SWR exercise the running powers over the line into the south Lanarkshire mineral areas.

=== Darvel and Strathaven, and then Stonehouse ===
The desire to connect new pits, and get access to existing ones, drove the Caledonian to get powers for more new lines by the Caledonian Railway Act 1896. Darvel had been served by the G&SWR since 1896, by a branch line from Kilmarnock. At the turn of the century, the Duke of Portland proposed an Avondale Railway to connect Darvel, Lesmahagow and Hamilton. His intention was to develop Troon Harbour further, getting access for South Lanarkshire coal to the harbour for export. At this late date this would have been a prodigious commercial undertaking, and it is not clear how realistic it was. Nonetheless, the Caledonian Railway was moved to promote a line itself, linking its Lesmahagow network with the G&SWR at Darvel.

The Caledonian opened the line from Strathaven to Darvel on 1 May 1902. The original Strathaven terminus was on the north-east side of the town, and the new line left the earlier route at Whiteshawgate Junction, a short distance north of the terminus. It fell steeply and curved round the south of the town over a long and high viaduct, then running broadly south-west to the G&SWR station at Darvel. When the line had been authorised, the G&SWR had been given the right to acquire the portion of the line that lay in Ayrshire, an extent of about 4 miles (6 km). It exercised that right in 1904, so that the two companies met at an end-on junction at "County Boundary"; there was no habitation or other feature there. There was earlier to have been a goods exchange yard there, but wiser counsel prevailed and any exchange was done in Darvel.

The passenger service was not extended to Darvel at first, but on 4 July 1904 a new Strathaven North station was opened alongside the original Strathaven terminus, which was reduced to a goods yard, named Flemington. On 1 October 1904 a new Stratheven Central station was opened, closer to the town centre.

In 1905 Strathaven was connected to Stonehouse; a new line ran east from Strathaven Central station to the Cot Castle termination of the 1864 line at Stonehouse. This line required a duplication of the striking viaduct at Strathaven. This line was relatively short but at the same time a more ambitious route was opened, also in 1905, connecting several existing branches. It ran from Merryton Junction, not far from Ferniegair on the original (1856) Lesmahagow line; it ran south to Stonehouse station, which was much enlarged; from there it east to join the Lesmahagow line at Blackwood. It then ran south through Lesmahagow itself to Alton Heights Junction. The 1856 Lesmahagow Railway had served the town at some distance to the east, and the earlier Lesmahagow station was renamed Brocketsbrae.

=== After 1914 ===
The South Lanarkshire branches were dependent on the Lanarkshire coalfield; the passenger and general merchandise traffic was insignificant in comparison to minerals. The output of the coalfield fell dramatically in the period after World War I: from 17.5 million tons in 1913 to 9 million in 1937. as the coal production declined, so did the viability of the railways.

If the mineral business declined, the passenger and general merchandise traffic had never been strong in such thinly populated districts, and several lines lost their passenger trains in the 1920s. The foreseen emergency conditions of World War II provoked further closures, and the mid-1960s saw the final blows.

Some of the lines continued as mineral-only branches, but gradually they too were closed.

=== Lanark branch electrification ===
In the 1970s most of the suburban passenger network in Glasgow was being converted to electric operation, and the electrification of the entire West Coast Main Line was being planned. Following completion of electrification of the Hamilton Circle route, the line from Motherwell to Lanark was electrified on 6 May 1974, the same day as the start of full electric passenger services between Glasgow and London. At that time the Argyle Line had not yet been constructed, and the trains ran to Glasgow Central.

Stansfield says that the overhead line equipment used was recovered from the Balloch branch when that line was singled.

=== Reopening to Larkhall ===
In the first years of the twenty-first century, a number of re-openings to passenger traffic took place in the Strathclyde area. Larkhall was selected as having the potential for such a scheme, and on 12 December 2005 the line was reopened to Larkhall from Haughhead Junction, enabling a through passenger service from Larkhall to Glasgow via Hamilton. Intermediate stations are at Merryton and Chatelherault, and the line is electrified.

== The present day ==
Most of the South Lanarkshire lines were heavily dependent on the coal industry, and that has declined and all but disappeared in the region. Most of the branch lines have closed, many of them in the first half of the twentieth century.

The remaining lines within the scope of this article are (as of 2015)

- the Lanark branch, which has a half-hourly passenger service to Glasgow and beyond, using the Argyle line; and
- the Larkhall branch, a re-opened short section of the Lesmahagow line; this too has a half-hourly service to Glasgow and the Argyle line.
- the short portion of the original Lesmahagow Railway between Lesmahagow Junction and Ross Junction, now part of the Hamilton Circle passenger service.

All other lines are closed.

== Topography ==
Locations in italics were not passenger stations.

=== Lesmahagow Railway and branches ===
Lesmahagow Junction to Bankend Colliery, opened to freight 1 December 1856. Passenger operation from Ferniegair to Blackwood and Stonehouse from 1 December 1866; extended from Ferniegair to Motherwell Bridge 1 April 1868; diverted to Hamilton from 2 October 1876. (Hamilton trains ran via Ross Junction to Motherwell from that date.) Passenger trains extended from Southfield Junction to Coalburn from 2 November 1891. The passenger service was diverted to the new Larkhall (Central) line from 1 October 1951. All passenger services discontinued from 4 October 1965.

- Lesmahagow Junction; at Motherwell but west of the Motherwell passenger station until it was relocated in 1885, facing Glasgow;
- Motherwell Bridge; close to present-day Motherwell station platforms on the Hamilton line; opened 1 April 1868; closed 31 July 1885 when present Motherwell station opened;
- Airbles; opened 15 May 1989;
- Ross Junction; facing junction to Hamilton line when that opened from 2 October 1876;
- Ferniegair; opened 1 December 1866 as northern terminus of passenger service; this was extended to Motherwell Bridge on 1 April 1868; relocated south of junction when the Hamilton line opened;
- Ferniegair Junction; line from Hamilton trailed in when that line opened from 2 October 1876, forming a triangle with Ross Junction and Haughhead Junction;
- Ferniegair; second station, relocated to enable Lesmahagow trains to run to Hamilton; opened 2 October 1876; closed 1 January 1917;
- Merryton Junction; 1905 Larkhall line diverged;
- Larkhall; opened 1 December 1866; renamed Larkhall East 1905; closed 10 September 1951;
- Ayr Road; opened 1 December 1866; renamed Dalserf 1903; closed 1 October 1951;
- Ayr Road Junction; Canderside branch diverged after 1862;
- Bents; opened 1 December 1866; renamed Netherburn 1868; closed 1 October 1951;
- Tillietudlem; opened May 1877; closed 1 October 1951;
- Southfield Junction; Southfield Pit branch diverged;
- Unnamed connection from Little Gill Colliery trails in;
- Auchenheath; opened 1 December 1866; closed 1 October 1951;
- Brocketsbrae; opened 1 December 1866; renamed Lesmahagow 1869; renamed Brocketsbrae 1909; closed 1 October 1951;
- Alton Heights Junction; a workmen's platform was provided between 1893 and 1926; Blackwood line trails in after 1905; Poniel Junction line diverges after 1883;
- Auchlochan Colliery; workmen's platform from 1907; public station from 1944; closed after 1956;
- Coalburn; opened 2 November 1891; closed 4 October 1965;
- Bankend (Colliery); workmen's platform from 1926.

Larkhall Central line. Opened 1 July 1905; closed to passengers 4 October 1965; closed completely 1968.

- Merryton Junction; see above;
- Larkhall Central; closed 4 October 1965;
- Stonehouse; see below.

Canderside and Stonehouse line. Opened 1862 from Ayr Road Junction to Canderside Pit; extended to Stonehouse and Cot Castle 1864; passenger traffic from 1 December 1866; closed between Canderside and Stonehouse 1935; closed between Ayr Road Junction and Canderside 1964; closed from Stonehouse 1965.

- Ayr Road Junction; see above;
- Shawrigg Colliery; 1898 - 1950;
- Canderside Pit;
- Stonehouse; opened 1 December 1866; 1905 line from Larkhall Central trailed in; 1905 line to Blackwood Junction diverged; closed to passengers 4 October 1965;
- Cot Castle.

Southfield and Blackwood branch. Opened 1856 as far as Southfield Pit; extended to Blackwood 1862 with passenger service from 1 December 1866; extended from Blackwood to Dunduff Colliery 1894 to 1920s; line closed 1959.

- Southfield Junction; see above;
- Southfield Pit;
- Blackwood Junction;
- Blackwood; open from 1 December 1866; transferred to new station on through line 1 July 1905.

Blackwood Junction to Alton Heights Junction. Opened 10 July 1905; closed to passenger traffic 4 October 1965; closed completely 1968.

- Blackwood Junction; see above;
- Blackwood; replaced earlier terminus station;
- Lesmahagow;
- Alton Heights Junction; trailed into 1856 Lesmahagow to Coalburn line.

Alton Heights Junction to Poniel Junction. Opened 1883; closed 1954.

- Alton Heights Junction; see above;
- Poniel Junction; see below.

Coalburn to Spireslack. Opened 1889, mineral traffic only; closed 1950s.

- Coalburn, Bankend Colliery;
- Spireslack Colliery;
- Fork to Galawhistle Colliery 1889 - 1910.

Lanark Branch. Opened 5 January 1855. East curve from Silvermuir Junction to Silvermuir South Junction opened 1 April 1864 and closed on 18 April 1966. The remainder of the branch is still open.

- Cleghorn Junction;
- Silvermuir South Junction; formed a triangle with Silvermuir Junction on the Carstairs line;
- Smyllum East Junction; line to Douglas diverged;
- Smyllum West Junction; line from Douglas trailed in, forming a triangle;
- Lanark.

Lanark to Muirkirk. Opened 1864 as far as Happendon; extended to Muirkirk G&SWR station 1873. Smyllum West curve closed 1965; Ponfeigh to Murikirk closed 1964; Smyllum East curve to Ponfeigh closed 1968. The passenger service throughout the line was discontinued from 5 October 1964.

- Smyllum Junctions;
- Lanark Racecourse; opened from August 1910; used for race meetings and military purposes only; closed 27 September 1964;
- Sandilands;
- Ponfeigh; opened December 1865;
- Douglas; renamed Happendon from 1931;
- Poneil Junction; see above;
- Douglas West; opened 1 October 1896;
- Inches; opened 1 June 1874;
- Glenbuck; opened October 1875; closed 4 August 1952;
- Muirkirk; G&SWR station.
