= Methodist Homes (MHA) =

Charity care provider for older people in Great Britain

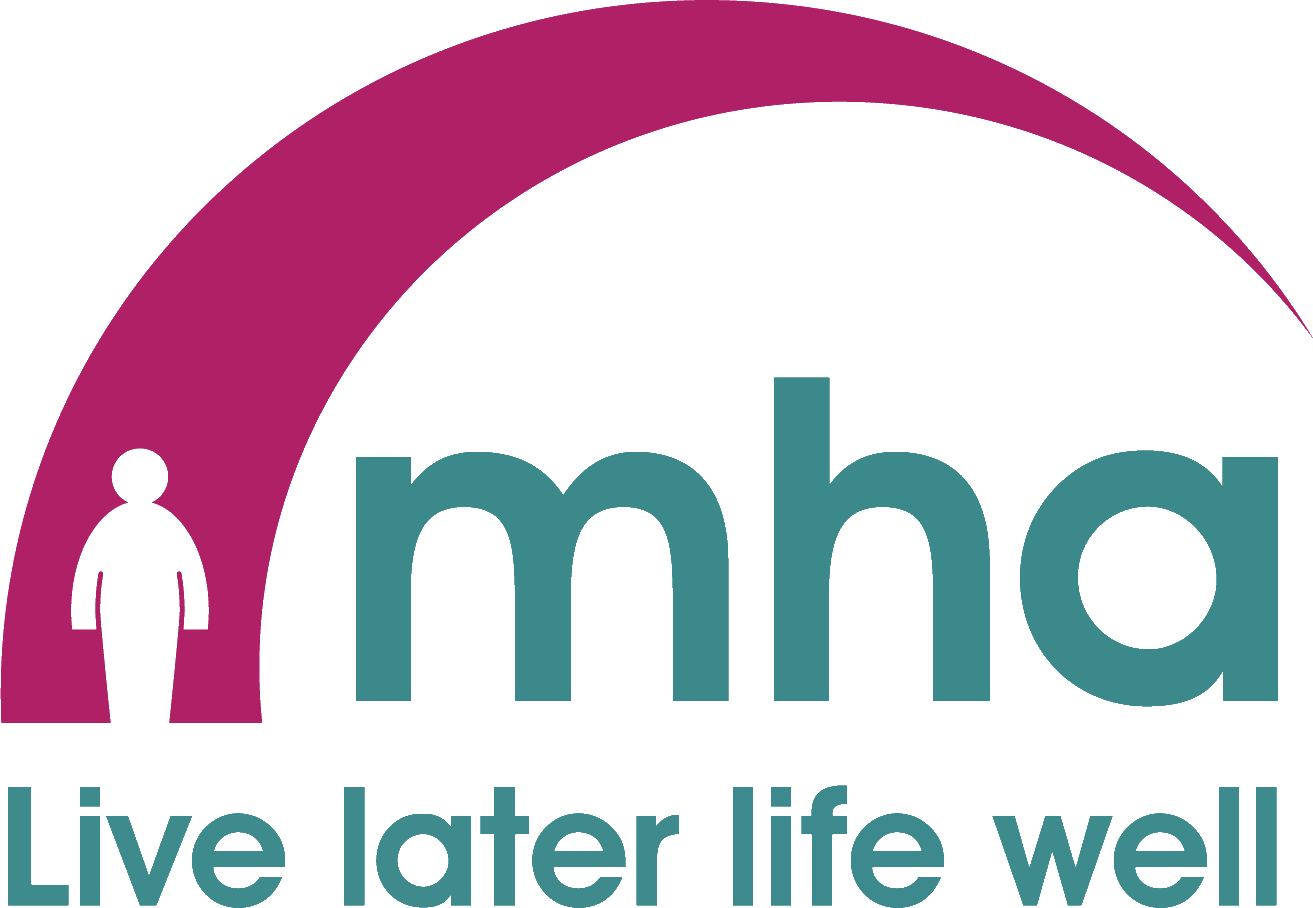
- Formation: September 1943
- Type: Charitable organisation
- Headquarters: Epworth House, 3 Stuart Street, DE1 2EQ
- Location: Derby, England
- Region served: United Kingdom
- Chairman: James Reilly
- Chief Executive: Sam Monaghan
- Revenue: £279 million (2023/24)
- Staff: 7,000 (2024)
- Volunteers: 3,000 (2024)
- Website: mha.org.uk
- Formerly called: Methodist Homes for the Aged

Methodist Homes (MHA) is a leading charity care provider for older people in Great Britain.

Founded in 1943 by the Methodist Church as an independent charity, originally named Methodist Homes for the Aged, MHA is committed to supporting people of all faiths and none. Its origins lay in the actions and observations of Revd Walter Hall, who raised concerns about poverty in old age and put a proposal forward to the Methodist Conference on 1943 on establishing the charity. The first home opened by MHA accommodated 12 elderly women and was opened in 1945.

The organisation continues to benefit from strong support from the Methodist community and other Christian denominations.

Headquartered in Derby, MHA operates across England and Wales. It offers a comprehensive range of services including residential, nursing and dementia care homes, retirement living communities and community-based support. The charity also provides a nationwide befriending service to help alleviate the impact of loneliness and isolation for old people.

== Operation ==
As part of its commitment to supporting older people and their families, MHA also offers a Later Life Hub, an online knowledge resource providing practical advice and guidance on a range of topics. These include planning for retirement, caring for an ageing parent, and maintaining health and wellbeing.

Since 2018, MHA has been recognised as a Top 20 care home group by carehome.co.uk. As of Summer 2022, MHA operated 90 care homes and 70 retirement living schemes.
