= Ivy Wallace =

British writer and illustrator

Ivy Lilian Wallace (7 October 1915 – 13 March 2006) was a British author/illustrator, artist and actress, best known for writing and illustrating the best-selling Pookie series and The Animal Shelf series of children's books.

== Early life ==
Born in Grimsby, England, the daughter of a Scottish doctor, Ivy's lifelong love of nature was born in early childhood when she accompanied her father on outings into the bluebell woods and flower-filled meadows of the Lincolnshire countryside. Her father, a keen amateur botanist and entomologist, encouraged her to paint plants in a botanically accurate way. Showing a lively imagination, she started writing stories and drawing pictures, encouraged by her parents who recognised her talents and thought that she might become an artist. Educated locally, she later attended Harrogate Ladies College where she became well known for her drawings and playful poems. However, when she left school, Ivy became a successful actress with Felixstowe Repertory Theatre and Hull New Theatre Company. When the Second World War broke out, she joined the British film industry to make Ministry of Information films.

== Pookie and other books ==
Later in the War she joined the police and it was when working for them that she first thought of Pookie, the winged rabbit. While working on a police switchboard, she doodled a picture of a fairy sitting on a toadstool with a little rabbit in front and by chance it appeared that the wings belonged to the rabbit. She then decided that fairies were "two a penny" so she erased the fairy and kept the little winged rabbit. She named him Pookie because "he had a little pookie face" and wrote his story. It began “This is the story of Pookie, a little white furry rabbit, with soft, floppity ears, big blue eyes and the most lovable rabbit smile in the world.”

Ivy illustrated her stories with delicate, detailed watercolour paintings that perfectly captured her evocative tales. In 1945, just after war ended, encouraged by friends to find a publisher for her manuscript, she visited William Collins & Sons in London without an appointment. She was turned away, crestfallen, but asked to leave her manuscript. A few weeks later she was contacted by William Hope Collins and asked to attend the Glasgow office where the Children's Books section was based. Borrowing some money from her brother to buy a new dress and a 'big hat' to make her appear more 'serious', she took the train north to Glasgow. She met with William Hope Collins in the (now demolished) Cathedral Street offices and not only did William accept the book, he also fell in love with its author. In 1950 Ivy and William married and went to live in the Scottish Borders. They were a devoted couple and had two daughters.

Ivy founded her own company Pookie Productions Ltd. In all, she wrote ten 'Pookie' books as well as the highly successful 'Animal Shelf' series for younger children and 'The Young Warrenders' series for older ones. For over 20 years, Ivy's beautiful books became a publishing phenomenon and were worldwide bestsellers. The first title Pookie sold over a million copies and subsequent titles became best-sellers and were translated into several languages. Pookie was read as far afield as Australia, New Zealand, Canada and South Africa. In Australia, the stories were broadcast in "Pookie's Half-Hour" and thousands of children attended Pookie rallies. The first two titles of The Animal Shelf series enchanted younger children and sold over 400,000 copies on publication. Ivy also enjoyed a successful career as a writer-illustrator for Wm Collins & Sons and for other international publishers. In 1950 she created the first baby record book 'Baby Days, A Record Year by Year' sold by Boots.

== Return from retirement ==
In 1967, her husband died suddenly leaving Ivy heartbroken. She closed her studio, too consumed with grief to continue something that had meant so much to them both. Eventually in 1994, spurred on by decades of letters and pleas from fans now grown up and wishing to share Pookie with their own children, Ivy and her daughters relaunched Pookie Productions Ltd, and republished her books which once again became international bestsellers. The Animal Shelf, animated by award-winning Cosgrove Hall Films, was a Children's BAFTA-nominated TV series on CITV, running to 52 episodes and broadcast in over 58 countries. In 1997 Ivy was the subject of the BBC Scotland documentary “Pookie Flies Again”. An exhibition of her life and work 'The Magical World of Pookie and The Animal Shelf' toured the UK from 1997 until 2000.

Ivy retired aged 85 and enjoyed spending time with her family and dogs and tending her beloved garden. She remained at her home near Biggar until 2002 when she moved to Auchlochan Garden Village where she died peacefully in her sleep at the age of 90.

Pookie Productions Ltd is the copyright holder and worldwide licensing agent for Ivy Wallace's work including the Pookie series and The Animal Shelf series of children's books. Today vintage copies of Ivy's books as well as the more recently published editions are regarded as highly collectable.

== Bibliography ==
Pookie series

- Pookie (1946)
- Pookie and the Gypsies (1947)
- Pookie Puts the World Right (1949)
- Pookie in Search of a Home (1951)
- Pookie believes in Santa Claus (1953)
- Pookie at the Seaside (1956)
- Pookie's Big Day (1958)
- Pookie and the Swallows (1961)
- Pookie in Wonderland (1963)
- Pookie and his Shop (1966)

Animal Shelf series

- Stripey to the Rescue (1948)
- Kinker visits the Animal Shelf (1948)
- Woeful and the Waspberries (1948)
- Getup Crusoe (1948)
- The Huge Adventure of Little Mut (1949)
- Gumpa and the Paint Box (1949)
- The Treasure Hunt (1951)

Young Warrenders series

- The Young Warrenders (1961)
- Thanks to Peculiar (1962)
- Strangers at Warrender's Halt (1963)
- The Snake Ring Mystery (1966)

Other books

- Baby Days (1950)
- The Kitty-poosies (1951)
- My Book of Kittens and Puppies
