= Auchlochan Collieries =

Colliery in Auchlochan

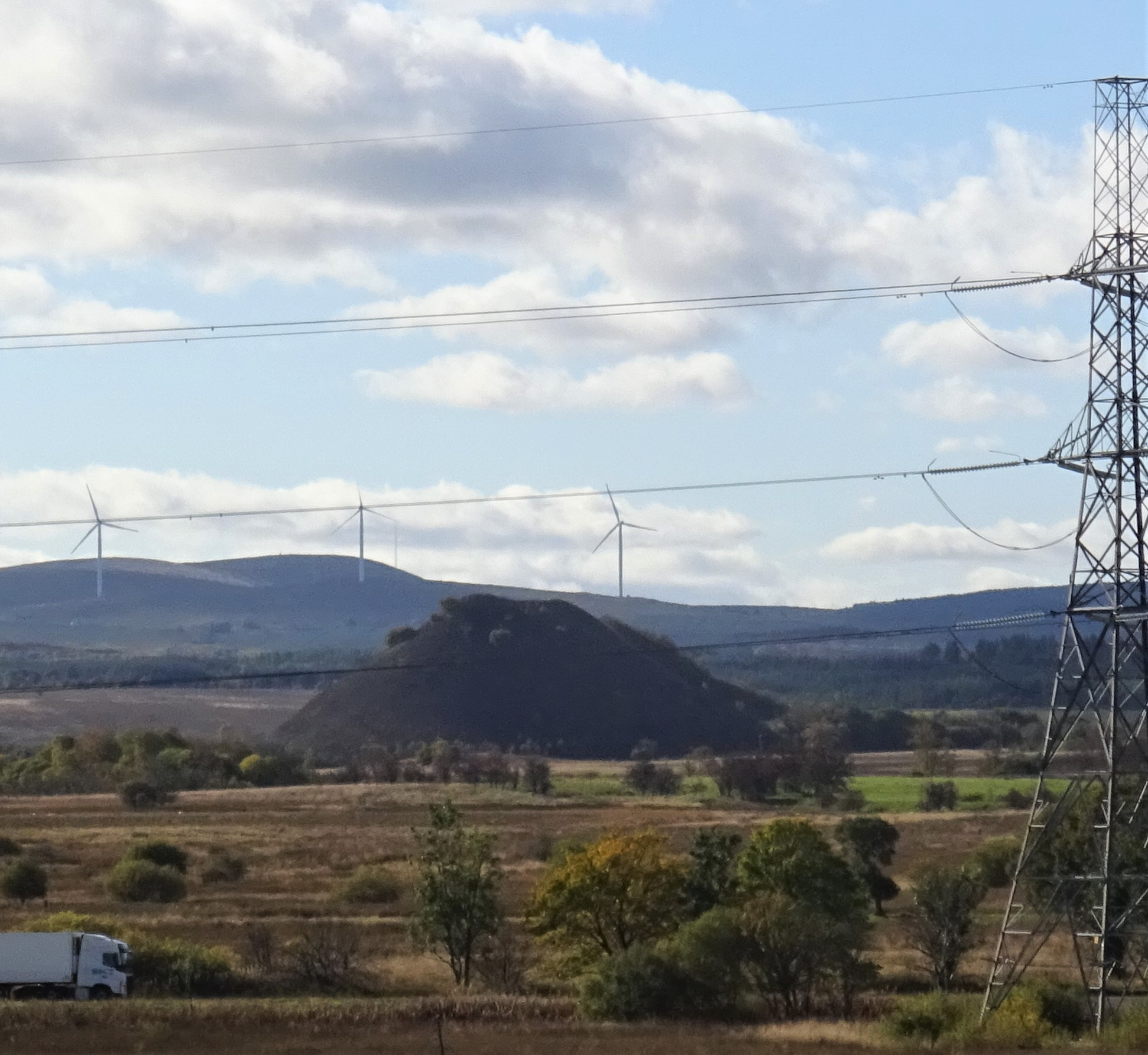
- Glaikhead Bing
- Interactive map of Auchlochan Collieries

Location
- Location: Auchlochan/Coalburn, South Lanarkshire, Scotland

Production
- Products: Coal
- Production: 600 tonnes per day (1948)

History
- Opened: 1890 (coaling began in 1894)
- Closed: 13 July 1968

Owner
- Company: W.C.S. Cunningham (1890-1900); Caprington & Auchlochan Collieries (1905-1910); Caprington & Auchlochan Collieries Ltd (1915-1930); William Dixon Ltd (1935-1946); National Coal Board (1947-1968)

The Auchlochan Collieries were several collieries in Auchlochan and Coalburn, South Lanarkshire, Scotland. Production started in 1894 - run by Caprington and Auchlochan Collieries Ltd and then by William Dixon & Company from the 1930s before the NCB took over in 1947 - ending in 1968 when the collieries closed. They were served at Auchlochan Platform railway station, part of the Coalburn Branch of the Caledonian Railway. Eight people were killed at the collieries.

== Collieries ==
- Auchlochan Colliery, Auchlochan 55°36′21″N 3°53′6″W
- Auchlochan No. 1 Colliery, Coalburn 55°35′21″N 3°53′26″W
- Auchlochan No. 2 Colliery, Coalburn 55°35′22″N 3°53′27″W
- Auchlochan No.6 Colliery, Coalburn 55°35′46″N 3°53′23″W
- Auchlochan No. 7 Colliery, Coalburn 55°35′37″N 3°53′28″W
- Auchlochan No. 8 Colliery, Coalburn 55°35′32″N 3°53′23″W
- Auchlochan No.9 Colliery, Auchlochan 55°36′20″N 3°53′6″W
- Auchlochan No.10 Colliery, Auchlochan 55°36′21″N 3°53′6″W
