= Braehead, South Lanarkshire =

Braehead is the name of three villages and hamlets in South Lanarkshire, Scotland.

- One is near East Kilbride, at 55°46′18″N 4°14′24″W
- One is near Coalburn, at 55°35′24″N 3°52′54″W
- One is near Lanark, at 55°44′12″N 3°39′54″W

== See also ==
- List of places in South Lanarkshire
