= Sirhowy Railway =

The Sirhowy Tramroad was a plateway built to convey the products of ironworks at Tredegar to Newport in South East Wales. It opened in 1805 between Tredegar and Nine Mile Point, a location west of Risca, from where the Monmouthshire Canal Company operated a tramroad to Newport. The Sirhowy Tramroad was operated at first by horse traction, but early locomotives were used, and a passenger service was operated.

In 1860 the Sirhowy Railway was incorporated to modernise the tramroad; it followed a similar alignment but with several modifications, and opened in 1863, between Tredegar and Nine Mile Point. A short extension northward to Nantybwch, joining the Merthyr, Tredegar and Abergavenny Railway, was opened shortly afterwards. The Sirhowy Railway was acquired by the London and North Western Railway, for which it formed a useful route to access Newport Docks.

The dominant traffic on the line was minerals: at first iron ore and later coal; the Great Western Railway used the lower part of the line for the trunk haulage of coal from Aberdare.

With the decline of the traditional mineral industries and the loss of local general traffic, the line closed in 1960.

== Monmouthshire Canal ==
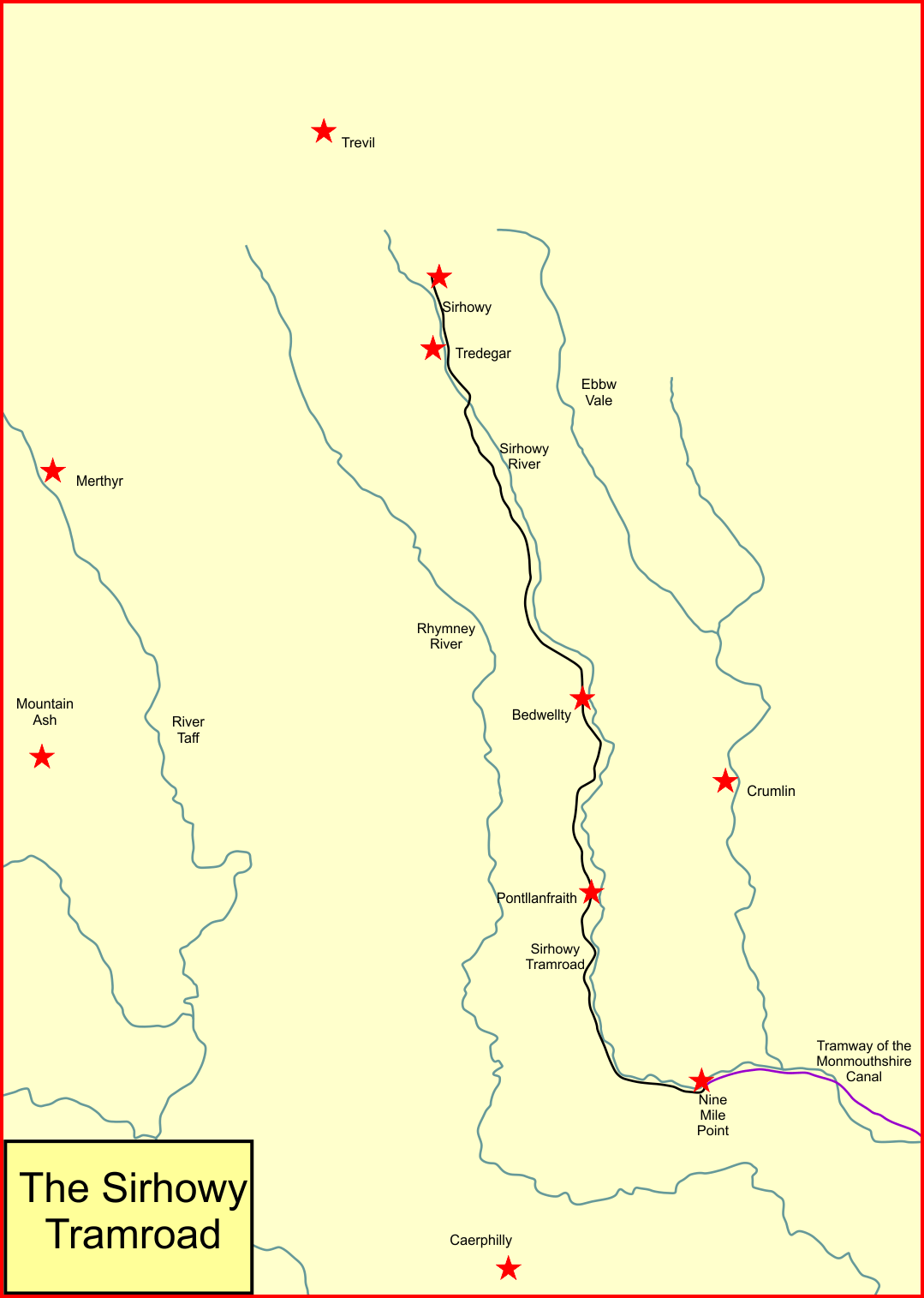
The Sirhowy tramroad

The area of the valleys of south-east Wales had long been notable for the rich mineral resources, especially coal and iron ore, and also limestone. Much of the useful mineral deposit was in the upper valleys, and ironworks developed there. Transport of the manufactured iron, and of the raw materials, was difficult, requiring pack animals to reach Newport for shipping. At the end of the eighteenth century, determined efforts were made to improve the situation, culminating in the authorisation in 1792 of the Monmouthshire Canal Navigation Company. This was to build a canal from Newport to Pontnewynydd, near Pontypool, and a branch to Crumlin. Plateway tramroads were to be built connecting the canal to mineral sites.

Many industrialists supported the works as it would considerably enhance their business, and the canal was opened in 1796, by which time many of the connecting tramroads had already been completed.

The canal was a success, but experience showed that it had shortcomings too. The large descent from the top to Newport made the transit slow. Shortage of water in summer and icing in winter delayed traffic. Most significant of all, there were many industrial locations not served by it or the tramroads. These were limited by the terms of the Monmouthshire Canal Navigation Act 1792 (32 Geo. 3. c. 102) to reaching works within seven miles (11.3 km) of the canal, and owners of works and pits outside that limit keenly felt the disadvantage.

== Linking Tredegar ==
The Tredegar iron works, and others in the Sirhowy Valley, were among those for which a suitable transport connection was urgently needed. Samuel Homfray, Richard Fothergill and Matthew Monkhouse were the co-founders of the Tredegar Ironworks, and a lease of 20 March 1800 from the landowner Sir Charles Morgan granted them not only the right to extract coal and iron ore from his land, but to build a tramroad on it "down the Sirhowy Valley to join the Monmouthshire Canal". The Monmouthshire Canal Company heard of this and negotiated with the Tredegar partners.

The engineer Benjamin Outram was called in by the directors of the Monmouthshire Canal to make recommendations for improving the situation in general. He reported later in 1800, and so far as the canal itself was concerned, he limited his proposals to the provision of additional reservoir capacity, to deal with the water shortage.

Instead of proposing an extension of the canal, he considered that a new line of plateway from Tredegar to Risca Church should be built. It would connect with the existing canal at Risca, and loads would be transferred there to barges. The line would have "all convenient turnouts", that is, passing loops—the previous local tramways had been simple single lines, and empty wagons ascending were manhandled off the track to allow loaded descending wagons to pass. In fact double track would be laid if necessary. His railway would be a plateway, in which the rails are L-shaped plates, the upstand providing the guidance to plain wagon wheels; the gauge was to be 4 ft 2 in (1,270 mm).

The canal company accepted his recommendations on 18 December 1800. There must have been a joint discussion with the Tredegar partners, for on the same day an undertaking was signed by the canal company; they promised to build at their own expense a tramroad from the Tredegar Works to a point on the canal near Risca Church by Christmas Day 1801.

In fact nothing of the sort was done; the Monmouthshire Canal Navigation Act 1802 (42 Geo. 3. c. cxv) of 26 June 1802 authorised the tramroad, but it was the Tredegar partners who had to build most of it. Homfray, Fothergill, Monkhouse, Thompson and Foreman, now also directors of the newly incorporated Sirhowy Tramroad Company, were to make the tramroad at their own expense from the Sirhowy Works to a location west of Risca, nine miles (14.5 km) from Newport: it soon became known as Nine Mile Point. The Monmouthshire Canal would build from there to Pillgwenlly, in Newport, except for a 1-mile (1.6 km) section through the Tredegar Estate which would be built by Sir Charles Morgan: he would retain the right to charge tolls on the mile of route. This section became known as "the Park Mile" or "the Golden Mile", and proved a source of considerable income to his estate. The Sirhowy Tramroad was the third public railway sanctioned by act of Parliament. The same act empowered Homfray and his partners to build a tramway from Tredegar to the Trevil limestone quarry.

The date of opening of the tramway is uncertain, but Lee said that the most probable date was 1805. Tasker implies that the first part of the tramroad opened in 1810; independent carriers were then permitted to use it on payment of a toll charge, and that it opened fully on or about 11 August 1811. There was very little habitation intermediately, and only a very limited network of roads.

Writing in 1824, Cumming described the tramroad:

The rail-way was completed about twenty years ago, also a turnpike road by the side of it for about seventeen miles, the total expense amounting to about 74,000 l [£74,000] or about 3,000 l per mile [including the Monmouthshire Canal's nine miles at the Newport end of the line]. About 40,000 l of this sum was expended by the canal company in consequence of building a bridge [the viaduct at Risca] and some very deep and expensive cutting, whilst the Tredegar iron company completed nearly double the distance at the cost of 30,000 l. Sir Charles Morgan expended 4,000 l upon one mile, but he had some deep cutting, and a double road to make. Notwithstanding the expense, the road pays the proprietors 30 per cent., having a considerable trade upon it...

For the first 9 miles out of Newport, being the parts made by Sir Charles Morgan and the canal company it is a double road... and on the Tredegar iron company's part of fifteen miles, it is a single road, with frequent turnouts [passing sidings] for the teams to pass. The whole line of the road for twenty-four miles is an inclined plane, averaging about the eighth of an inch in the yard [a gradient of 1 in 288], or something more, but that part made by the Tredegar iron company is of somewhat greater declivity than the rest. The coal and iron are conveyed on it in waggons, each carrying about forty-five to fifty hundredweight, exclusive of the waggon, and a team of four or five horses will draw about fifteen of these waggons down, and take the same number of empty ones back, with ease.

From 1824 a passenger coach, known locally as "the Caravan", was operated on the line by John Kingson of Newport. Other carriers followed his lead.

Scott described the line, but he made the mistake of stating that the Sirhowy line continued to Newport. He said that the Monmouthshire Canal had several connecting railways

but the most important is the Sirhowy line. This railway commences at the Monmouth Canal, Pillgwenlly, and passing through Tredegar Park up the Ebwy [Ebbw] river at Risca, crosses that river by a bridge of 16 arches, following afterwards the course of the Sirhowy river by Tredegar and Sirhowy Iron-works to Trevill Lime-works, about 28 miles. A branch proceeds to the Romney [Rhymney] Ironworks, and from the same place the Brinore railway is continued over the Black Mountain to the Vale of the Uske at Brecon... there are also branches from the [Sirhowy] railway to the several collieries, and likewise to the Monmouthshire Canal in two places.

All traffic was horse-drawn until 17 December 1829 when a steam locomotive named Britannia was introduced on a trial basis. It had been ordered specially from Robert Stephenson of Killingworth by Samuel Homfray junior. The locomotive was a success, although the first run to Newport was badly delayed, and due to its weight numerous of the tramplates were broken. Nevertheless, it made daily journeys of 28 miles (45 km) hauling loads of 50 and 60 long tons (56 and 67 short tons; 51 and 61 t), while reducing the cost of horse power by 35%. Other carriers soon followed by introducing locomotive power themselves.

However breakage of the tramplates due to the weight of the locomotives was a continuing problem; in 1830 the Monmouthshire company ruled that all locomotives on their line must be suspended on proper springs.

== Formation of the Sirhowy Railway ==
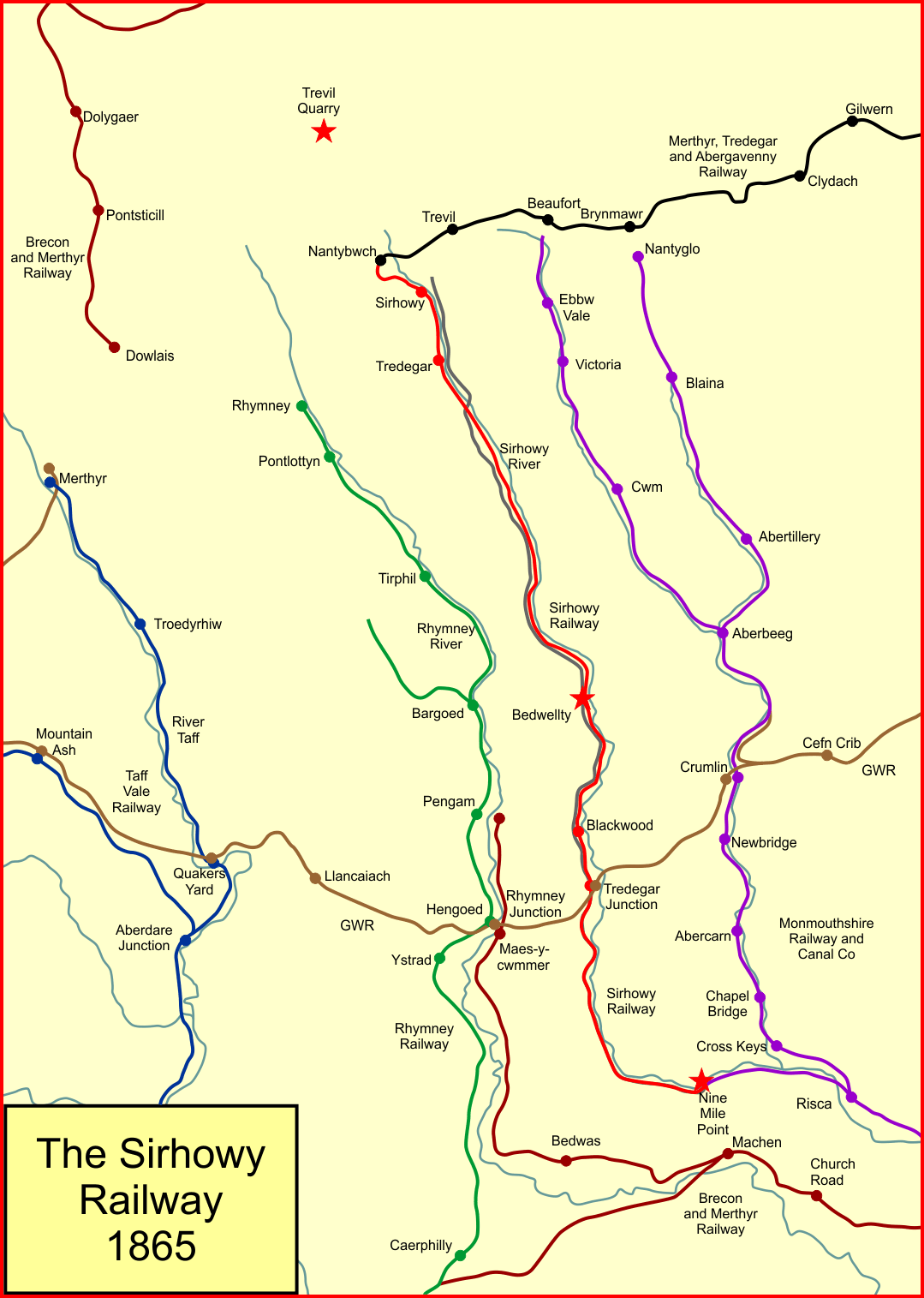
The Sirhowy Railway in 1865

The Sirhowy Tramroad was effectively a monopoly, and it was making good profits; for many years it saw little need to adapt itself to changed circumstances. Nevertherless the neighbouring Monmouthshire Canal Company, on which the Sirhowy line depended to reach Newport, was extending its network. Intending to become a full passenger-carrying railway (rather than allowing carriers on to its line), the Monmouthshire Canal changed its name to the Monmouthshire Railway and Canal Company in 1845. It had been under pressure in 1847 and again in 1849 to convert its line to a railway. It started to do so, but to continue the tramroad operation by independent carriers during the conversion, it adopted a combination tramplate that could carry standard gauge railway vehicles as well as tramroad waggons.

By the end of 1855 the whole of the Monmouthshire system in the Western Valley (with the exception of the Rassa Tramroad) had been transformed into locomotive worked standard gauge railways. This included the Nine Mile Point branch from Risca.

Sirhowy Railway Act 1860 (Note: Section 1.)
- Act of Parliament
- Parliament of the United Kingdom
- Long title: An Act for changing the Name of the Sirhowy Tramroad Company to the Name "The Sirhowy Railway Company;" and for authorizing the Company to make new Works, and to maintain and work the Sirhowy Line as a Railway, and to raise further Funds; and for regulating their Capital and Borrowing Powers; and for other Purposes.
- Citation: 23 & 24 Vict. c. lxxi
- Territorial extent: United Kingdom

Dates
- Royal assent: 25 May 1860
- Commencement: 25 May 1860 (Note: The Acts of Parliament (Commencement) Act 1793.)

Other legislation
- Amends: Monmouthshire Canal Navigation Act 1802

Text of statute as originally enacted

By this time it was impossible for the Sirhowy Tramroad to continue to ignore technological progress, and parliamentary approval to convert the system to a railway was obtained by an act of Parliament, the Sirhowy Railway Act 1860 (23 & 24 Vict. c. lxxi), of 25 May 1860; this changed the name of the company to the Sirhowy Railway Company. The act also authorised a northward extension of the line to a junction at Nantybwch on the planned Merthyr, Tredegar and Abergavenny Railway, which had received parliamentary approval in 1859.

The owners of the tramroad to Trevil were also authorised to convert it to a railway. Minor deviations of the Sirhowy line of route were made in the lower part of the system, but the new track followed an entirely distinct course passing through Blackwood and Argoed, where the tramroad passed through the main streets, having been laid before the settlements developed. The whole length from Bedwellty Pits through Tredegar to Sirhowy was also on a new alignment. It probably opened in 1863.

Sirhowy Railway Act 1865
- Act of Parliament
- Parliament of the United Kingdom
- Long title: An Act for authorizing the Sirhowy Railway Company to construct a Railway in substitution for the authorized Extension of their Railway to the Merthyr, Tredegar, and Abergavenny Railway, and to deviate their authorized Railway in the Parish of Bedwellty, and to use Parts of the Merthyr, Tredegar, and Abergavenny Railway; and for confirming the Mode in which certain Roads have been crossed or diverted by the Company; and for suspending the Operation of certain Provisions of "The Sirhowy Railway Act, 1860," as to Passenger Trains to be run upon the Railways of the Company and the Monmouthshire Railway; and for other Purposes.
- Citation: 28 & 29 Vict. c. cccxlii

Dates
- Royal assent: 5 July 1865

The Nantybwch extension was not made according to the Sirhowy Railway Act 1860; its route was amended by the Sirhowy Railway Act 1865 (28 & 29 Vict. c. cccxlii) of 5 June 1865, and opened on 2 November 1868. The act also changed the planned direction of the connection there so that it faced east, towards Abergavenny.

The Sirhowy Railway Company hesitated in providing a passenger train service on the new line, although running powers were available over the Monmouthshire Railway and Canal Company's line from Nine Mile Point to Newport. On 10 March 1864, Captain Rich of the Board of Trade issued a report of his inspection of the line preparatory to the introduction of passenger trains; it was not favourable. Distant signals were required at several locations. At Nine Mile Point "there is no station and no [roadway or pedestrian] approach to a station. A platform has been erected for the purpose of landing the passengers from the Sirhowy carriages and enabling them to re-enter the Monmouthshire carriages at the same platform. The Sirhowy Railway expect to work in connection with the Monmouthshire Railway Company but desire at the same time to provide for independent working. They have not yet made any arrangements with the Monmouthshire Railway Company and it will be necessary that there should be a passenger platform at each side of the Sirhowy Railway which is doubled at Nine Mile Station, and further that there should be up and down lines at each of the two platforms so that the passengers may change carriages, and that the risk of a collision shall be avoided by the trains of each company coming up at different sides of the up and down platforms.

The list of shortcomings continued and Rich ended "I have received no undertaking as to the proposed method of working. I beg to submit that the Sirhowy Railway cannot by reason of the incompleteness of the works be opened for passenger traffic without danger to the public using the same." After another false start the line eventually opened to passenger traffic on 19 June 1865.

The hesitation in finalising the working arrangements may have been due to negotiations then in progress for either the Monmouthshire Company, the Great Western Railway or the London and North Western Railway to take over the Sirhowy Railway, but that fell through. Accordingly, passenger services between Sirhowy and Newport Dock Street finally started on 19 June 1865, using the Monmouthshire Nine Mile Point branch. The passenger trains ran through without the necessity to change trains at Nine Mile Point. There were three weekday and two Sunday trains each way, with intermediate stops at Tredegar, Argoed, Blackwood, Tredegar Junction and Risca. No stop was made at Nine Mile Point, until 1869; it was known as Nine Mile Point (Quarry Mawr) at first. The journey time was 1 hour and 20 minutes. The Nantybwch extension opened on 2 November 1868.

== Absorption by the LNWR ==
As early as 1860 LNWR management had taken an interest in the Sirhowy line: on 16 April 1860 an extraordinary general meeting of the Merthyr, Tredegar and Abergavenny Railway shareholders, aligned to the LNWR, supported the parliamentary bill to transform the Sirhowy Tramway into a railway, seeing it as in their strategic interest. Apart from any other consideration, this was to be the means of the MT&AR reaching Tredegar from Nantybwch. On 26 December 1862 it was agreed to urge the Sirhowy Railway Company to complete the link in time for the opening of the MT&AR. In 1863 the Sirhowy was continuing to make positive responses but the LNWR faction "as being frustrated by an upstart little line which was failing to grasp the economic opportunities falling into its lap".

London and North Western Railway (Sirhowy Railway Vesting) Act 1876
- Act of Parliament
- Parliament of the United Kingdom
- Long title: An Act for Vesting in the London and North Western Railway Company the Undertaking of the Sirhowy Railway Company.
- Citation: 39 & 40 Vict. c. cxxxiii

Dates
- Royal assent: 13 July 1876

Text of statute as originally enacted

For a decade, there had been talk of the Sirhowy Railway being acquired by one of the neighbouring concerns. In November 1873 the Monmouthshire Railway approached the Sirhowy with an offer to buy their concern for £295,000. Negotiations continued in 1874, and then it appeared certain that the Great Western Railway would conclude a deal. The GWR promoted a parliamentary bill in the 1875 session for a new line connecting Nine Mile Point and Caerleon, so by-passing Newport, which was heavily congested at the time. In fact it was the LNWR which started working trains over the Sirhowy line from 1 July 1875, and on 21 August 1875 a working agreement was concluded; this was enabled by a general clause on the Sirhowy Railway Act 1865. Sirhowy Railway Company debentures to the extent of £56,633 were taken on by the LNWR, and Sirhowy ordinary and preference stock was exchanged for an equivalent amount of LNWR interest bearing stock. All this was ratified by the London and North Western Railway (Sirhowy Railway Vesting) Act 1876 (39 & 40 Vict. c. cxxxiii) of 13 July 1876.

By this time the Monmouthshire Railway and Canal Company had been in the hands of the Great Western Railway for a year. There were protective clauses in the act for both the larger companies: the LNWR had access as of right to Newport Docks. The rights only extended to traffic originating on the Sirhowy Railway, and accordingly the aspiration by the GWR to run Aberdare coal trains over the Sirhowy line was for the time being frustrated, and the planned Nine Mile Point to Caerleon line was therefore pointless, and was dropped. However, an amicable agreement was made, and the Aberdare traffic did start running (from Tredegar Junction to Nine Mile Point) from 1 February 1877, and in 1883 the LNWR granted running powers permanently.

The timetable was modified with the withdrawal of the two Sunday services. From March 1880, Sirhowy services ceased using Newport Dock Street and ran into the rebuilt station at Newport High Street. As Nine Mile Point was part of the GWR, and the LNWR having no running powers for mineral traffic south of this, it led to iron and coal services being diverted on the Vale of Neath Railway and pathed via Hengoed to Aber Sidings then to Alexandra Docks and Newport as a means of avoiding the GWR. When the LNWR was absorbed into the LMS at grouping a deal was struck with GWR to allow all traffic on the branch to access Newport Docks directly, albeit with a change of motive power at Nine Mile Point.

== Rundown and closure ==
In 1923 most of the railways of Great Britain were "grouped" into four large concerns, following the Railways Act 1921. The LNWR became part of the new London, Midland and Scottish Railway. Little change was noticeable locally on the line. Government once again restructured the industry in 1948, when the Transport Act 1947 resulted in nationalisation. Competition from bus services led to falling passenger receipts; the passenger service was withdrawn from 13 June 1960, the last train having run on Saturday 11 June. A few goods services ran after that time: the section from Sirhowy to Tredegar continued in operation until closure on 4 November 1963; from Tredegar to Pontllanfraith closed on 30 April 1969, and finally from Tredegar Junction to Risca closed on 4 May 1970.

== Present day ==
Little remains of the Sirhowy Railway; in terms of station infrastructure, only the station master's house at Hollybush has survived. National Cycle Network route 467 follows much of the trackbed from Blackwood to Hollybush.

== Location list ==
- Tredegar Nantybwch; MT&AR station; opened 1 March 1864; renamed Nantybwch 1868; closed 13 June 1960; Sirhowy line diverged from Abergavenny to Merthyr line;
- Sirhowy; opened 19 June 1865; closed 13 June 1960;
- Tredegar; opened 19 June 1865; closed 13 June 1960;
- Bedwelty; opened by June 1871; soon renamed Bedwellty, later Bedwellty Pits, later Bedwellty Pits Halt; closed 13 June 1960;
- Pochin Pits Colliery Platform; opened by October 1893; private station for miners from 2 October 1922; closed 13 June 1960;;
- Hollybush; opened by August 1871; resited August 1891, renamed Holly Bush 1899; closed 13 June 1960;
- Markham Village Halt; opened 1 February 1917; closed 13 June 1960;
- Argoed; opened 19 June 1865; later renamed Argoed Halt; closed 13 June 1960;
- Blackwood; opened 19 June 1865; closed 13 June 1960;
- Tredegar Junction; opened 19 June 1865; renamed Pontllanfraith 1911; renamed Pontllanfraith High Level 1949; closed 13 June 1960;
- Bird in Hand Junction; divergence of Taff Vale Extension Line;
- Tredegar Lower Junction; southern apex of triangle with Taff Vale Extension Line;
- Wyllie Halt; opened 19 December 1932; closed 13 June 1960;
- Ynysddu; opened by August 1871; closed 13 June 1960;
- Pont Lawrence Halt; opened 2 October 1911; closed 4 February 1957;
- Nine Mile Point; opened 1869; closed 2 February 1959

== Bibliography ==
- Awdry, Christopher (1990). Encyclopaedia of British Railway Companies. Sparkford: Patrick Stephens Ltd. ISBN 1-8526-0049-7. OCLC 19514063. CN 8983.
- Byles, Aubrey (1982). The History of the Monmouthshire Railway and Canal Company. Cwmbran: Village Publishing. ISBN 0-946043-00-0.
- Hall, Mike (2009). Lost Railways of South Wales. Newbury: Countryside Books. ISBN 978-1-84674-172-2.
- Hurst, Geoffrey (1991). Register of Closed Railways 1948–1991. Milepost Publications. ISBN 0-947796-18-5.
- Page, James (1988) [1979]. South Wales. Forgotten Railways. Vol. 8. Newton Abbot: David & Charles. ISBN 0-946537-44-5.
- Tasker, W.W. (1986). The Merthyr, Tredegar & Abergavenny Railway and branches. Poole: Oxford Publishing Co. ISBN 978-0-86093-339-7.
- Tasker, W.W. (1992) [1978]. Railways in the Sirhowy Valley. Oxford: Oakwood Press. ISBN 0-85361-415-6.
