= Maryville railway station =

Former railway station in Scotland

Maryville

General information
- Location: Uddingston, Glasgow; Scotland
- Coordinates: 55.8335°N 4.0975°W
- Platforms: 2

Other information
- Status: Disused

History
- Original company: North British Railway

Key dates
- 1 April 1878: Opened as Maryville
- 1 February 1908: Closed
- 4 October 1964: Line closed to freight
Location

Maryville railway station (NS687620) was opened in 1878 at Maryville, a small community in the Uddingston area to the south-east of Glasgow, Scotland on the old Glasgow, Bothwell, Hamilton and Coatbridge Railway between Shettleston and Hamilton. Clydeside and Bredisholm collieries were also served by the station.

== History ==
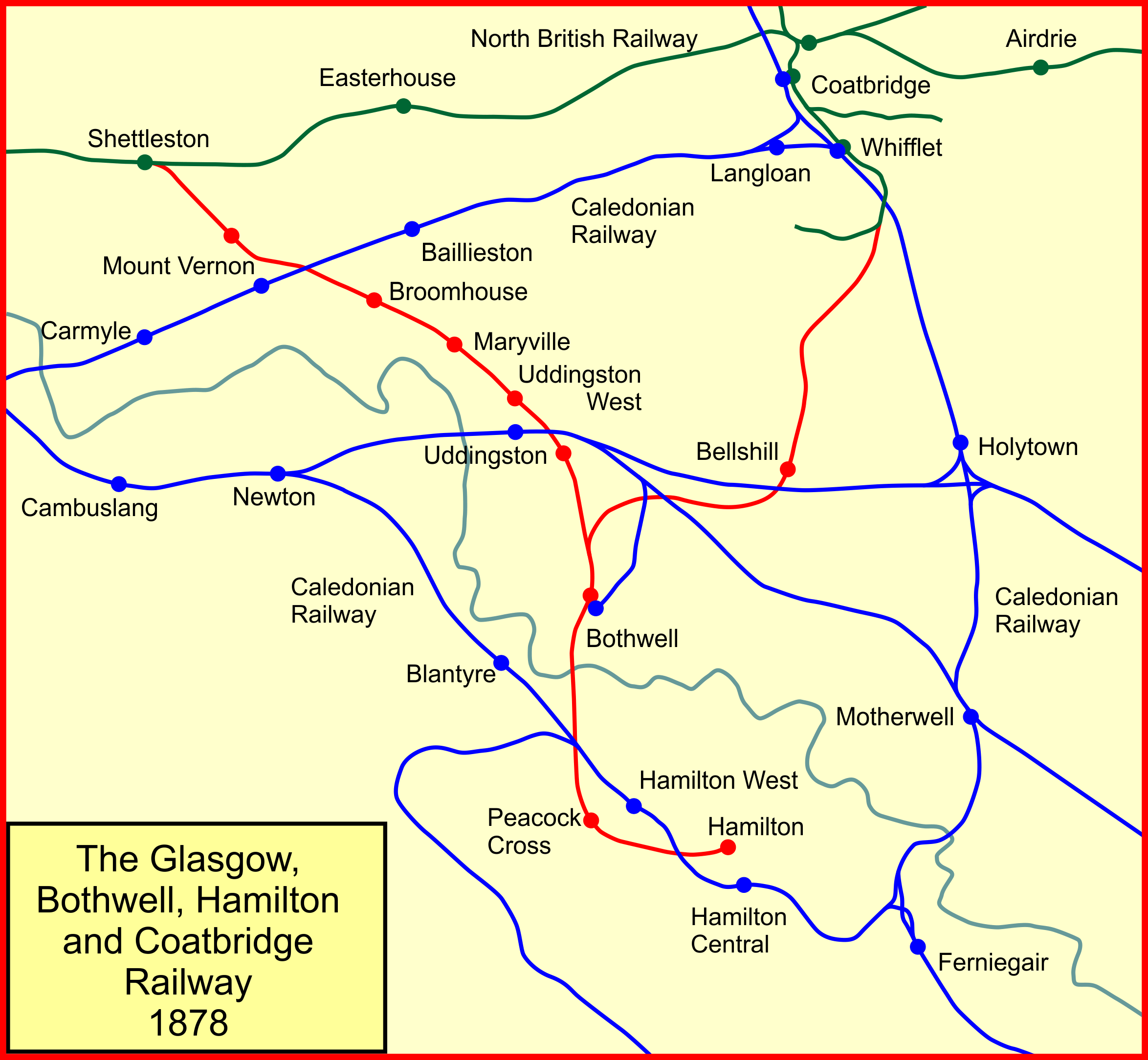
Map of the GBH&CR before Calderpark Halt was opened.

The station was opened by the North British Railway to serve the Maryville area and its collieries in 1878 on the Glasgow, Bothwell, Hamilton and Coatbridge Railway route. The route was later known as the London and North Eastern Railway's Hamilton Branch. The line was closed to passengers in 1955 and to freight traffic on 4 October 1964. Passenger trains continued to run to Bothwell until 4 July 1955.

=== Infrastructure ===
A signalbox stood at the west end of the station with its two platforms and a pedestrian footbridge on the double track line. The main station buildings with the ticket office and waiting room on the southern side together with a shelter on the northern side. Road access was provided on both sides of the station. The signalbox was replaced by a ground frame in 1940, controlling the access to a short branch to Clydeside and a 1-mile 8 chain branch to Bredisholm collieries. In 1910 Maryville is no longer present, the northern platform having been replaced by three sidings and later four, entered from the west where the signal box is located. Uddingston West station stood close by, just to the east.

=== Remains on site ===
The Maryville motorway interchange (M73 / M74) runs across much of the old station site (its location was almost exactly at the junction from the A74 leading to the southbound M74).

Preceding station	Disused railways	Following station
Calderpark	North British Railway; Glasgow, Bothwell, Hamilton and Coatbridge Railway	Uddingston West
