= Burnbank railway station =

Disused railway station in Scotland

Burnbank
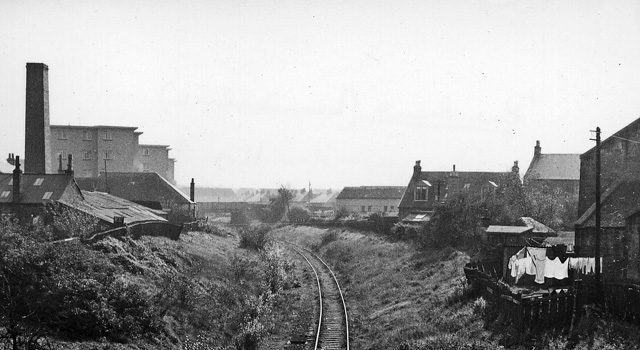

General information
- Location: Hamilton, Lanarkshire; Scotland
- Coordinates: 55.7835°N 4.0725°W
- Platforms: 2

Other information
- Status: Disused

History
- Opened: 1 April 1878; 147 years ago as Greenfield; 2 June 1919; 106 years ago Re-opened as Burnbank
- Closed: 1 January 1917; 108 years ago 1 October 1952; 73 years ago
- Original company: Glasgow, Bothwell, Hamilton and Coatbridge Railway
- Pre-grouping: North British Railway
- Post-grouping: LNER
Location

Burnbank railway station was a railway station that served the suburb of Burnbank in Hamilton, South Lanarkshire. It is one of several railway stations to have served Hamilton, and one of three to be closed permanently.

== History ==
The station was opened on 1 April 1878 as Greenfield, and was later renamed Burnbank. The station closed on 1 January 1917, but re-opened again on 2 June 1919 along with others on the line (with the exception of Peacock Cross).

Originally it was served by the Glasgow, Bothwell, Hamilton and Coatbridge Railway, and later, the North British Railway. Under the Railways Act 1921, the NBR became part of the London and North Eastern Railway (LNER) who continued to serve the line. Burnbank saw trains going to and from Hamilton. The LNER was nationalized under the Transport Act 1947 and became part of British Railways who also continued to serve the line until 1952.

Just north of the station there was a spur to Burnbank goods depot.

The station was again closed on 15 September 1952.

== Today ==
No trace of Burnbank station remains. The remains of the trackbed and presumably the platforms were still visible in the 1980s, at which time the land was landscaped and houses built upon. However, while traces of the station are gone, the line's history still remains visible with old bridges still remaining in and around the area.

| Preceding station | Historical railways | Following station |
|---|---|---|
| Bothwell | Glasgow, Bothwell, Hamilton and Coatbridge Railway; North British Railway | Peacock Cross |
