= Uddingston West railway station =

Former railway station in Scotland

Uddingston West

General information
- Location: Uddingston, South Lanarkshire; Scotland
- Coordinates: 55.8276°N 4.0866°W
- Platforms: 2

Other information
- Status: Disused

History
- Original company: Glasgow, Bothwell, Hamilton and Coatbridge Railway
- Pre-grouping: North British Railway
- Post-grouping: LNER

Key dates
- 1883: Opened as Uddingston
- 1 January 1917: Closed
- 2 June 1919: Re-opened
- 4 July 1955: Closed
Location

Uddingston West railway station served the town of Uddingston in South Lanarkshire on the Glasgow, Bothwell, Hamilton and Coatbridge Railway between Shettleston and Hamilton.

== History ==
Uddingston West was opened in 1883 on the Glasgow, Bothwell, Hamilton and Coatbridge Railway. It was closed as a wartime economy measure between 1917 and 1919. Uddingston West was closed on 4 July 1955. The line closed to freight traffic on 4 October 1964.

== Services ==
Preceding station	Historical railways	Following station
Maryville	North British Railway; Glasgow, Bothwell, Hamilton and Coatbridge Railway	Uddingston East
