= Uddingston East railway station =

Former railway station in Scotland

Uddingston East

General information
- Location: Uddingston, South Lanarkshire; Scotland
- Coordinates: 55.8220°N 4.0763°W
- Platforms: 2

Other information
- Status: Disused

History
- Original company: Glasgow, Bothwell, Hamilton and Coatbridge Railway
- Pre-grouping: North British Railway
- Post-grouping: LNER

Key dates
- 1 April 1878: Opened as Uddingston
- 1 January 1917: Closed
- 2 June 1919: Re-opened
- 28 February 1953: Renamed as Uddingston East
- 4 July 1955: Closed
Location

Uddingston East railway station served the town of Uddingston in South Lanarkshire on the Glasgow, Bothwell, Hamilton and Coatbridge Railway between Shettleston and Hamilton.

== History ==
Uddingston was opened on 1 April 1878 on the Glasgow, Bothwell, Hamilton and Coatbridge Railway. It was closed as a wartime economy measure between 1917 and 1919. Following nationalisation the station was renamed as Uddingston East to avoid confusion with the nearby Clydesdale Junction Railway station of the same name on 28 February 1953. Uddingston East was closed two years later on 4 July 1955. The line closed to freight traffic on 4 October 1964.

== Services ==
Preceding station	Historical railways	Following station
Uddingston West	North British Railway; Glasgow, Bothwell, Hamilton and Coatbridge Railway	Bothwell
