= Broomhouse railway station =

Disused railway station in Scotland

Broomhouse
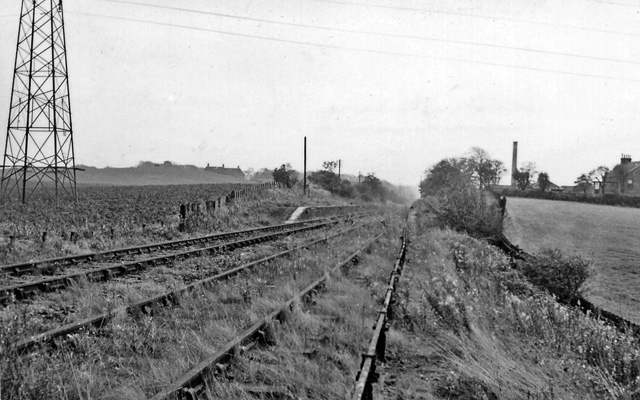

General information
- Location: Broomhouse, Glasgow; Scotland
- Coordinates: 55°50′25″N 4°07′16″W
- Platforms: 2

Other information
- Status: Disused

History
- Original company: North British Railway
- Post-grouping: London and North Eastern Railway

Key dates
- 1878: Opened as Broomhouse
- 1 January 1917: Closed
- 2 June 1919: Re-opened
- 24 September 1927: Closed to passengers
- 1 September 1953: Station closed to freight
- 4 October 1964: Line closed to freight
Location

Broomhouse railway station was opened in 1878 at Broomhouse in the Baillieston area of Glasgow, Scotland on the old Glasgow, Bothwell, Hamilton and Coatbridge Railway between Shettleston and Hamilton. The miner's rows at Boghall were close to the station site.

== History ==
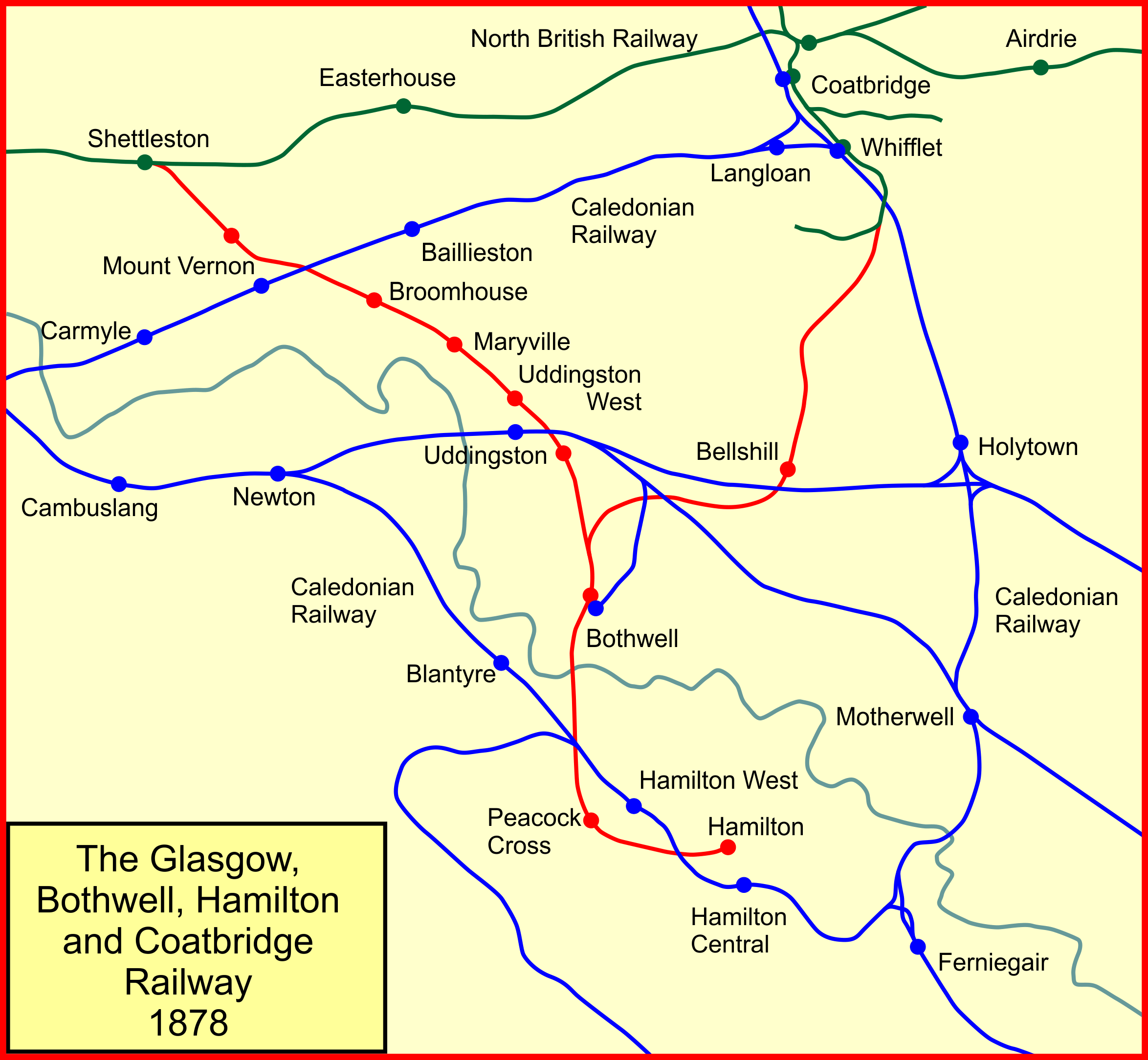
Map of the GBH&CR before the halt was opened.

The station was opened by the North British Railway to serve the Broomhouse area in 1878 on the Glasgow, Bothwell, Hamilton and Coatbridge Railway route.

The route was also known as the London and North Eastern Railway's Hamilton Branch. It closed to passenger traffic on 4 October 1927 and to freight in 1953, having been previously closed to passengers between 1917 and 1919 as a wartime economy. The line was closed to freight traffic on 4 October 1964. Passenger trains continued to run to Bothwell until 4 July 1955.

=== Infrastructure ===
A signal box that controlled the colliery line lay at the south end of the station on the north side, replaced in 1914 and closed in 1960. Daldowie and Broomhouse collieries lay nearby to the north and south respectively, and crossovers on the double-track line in the area of the station allowed for the movement of waggons for these customers. There was a siding to a brickworks. The ticket office and waiting room were on the south platform, and a shelter on the north and a pedestrian footbridge were present.

The line to the west cut over the Caledonian Railway's Rutherglen and Coatbridge Railway line.

=== Remains on site ===
A road now runs across the old station site.

Preceding station	Disused railways	Following station
Calderpark	North British Railway; Glasgow, Bothwell, Hamilton and Coatbridge Railway	Mount Vernon (NBR)
