= Newton, South Lanarkshire =

Coordinates: 55.82134°N 4.124680°W

Newton: Scottish Gaelic: Am Baile Ùr
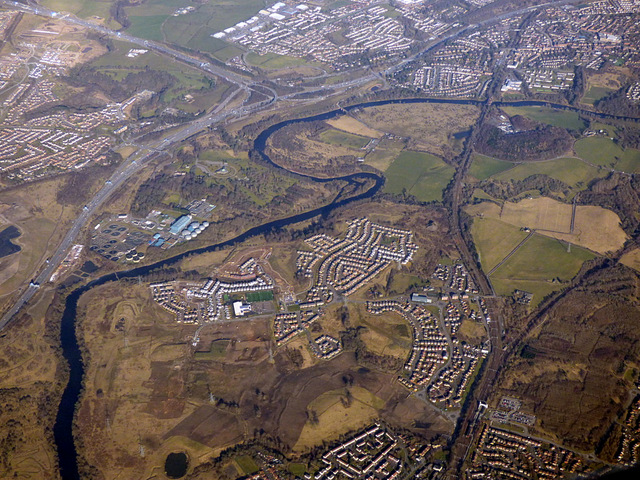
- Aerial view of Newton looking east, March 2018

- Location within Scotland Newton (Scotland)
- Country: Scotland
- Sovereign state: United Kingdom
- Post town: GLASGOW
- Postcode district: G72 6
- Dialling code: 0141
- Police: Scotland
- Fire: Scottish
- Ambulance: Scottish
- UK Parliament: Rutherglen and Hamilton West
- Scottish Parliament: Rutherglen

Newton is a mainly residential district in the town of Cambuslang in Scotland; it is situated directly south of the River Clyde. Newton is within the Cambuslang East ward of the South Lanarkshire Council area. Formerly a mining settlement from the mid-19th to mid-20th centuries then sparsely populated for several decades, in the early 2000s it was designated a 'Community Growth Area' for residential development with several hundred houses, a new primary school (and a larger rebuild of an existing school) and associated infrastructure constructed in phases over several years into the 2020s, mostly on fields previously used by a farm which had operated for several centuries before closing around the turn of the 21st century.

Newton railway station is a terminus on the Greater Glasgow suburban railway, the lines for which form the southern boundary of the area (the Drumsagard neighbourhood is on the opposite side). To the west, Newton and the neighbouring village of Westburn are divided by the small Newton Burn, and to the east it is separated from farmland belonging to the town of Blantyre by the Rotten Calder river which flows into the Clyde.

== History ==
=== Mining village ===
Originally land owned by the Clan Hamilton, a hamlet called Newton appears on William Roy's military survey of Scotland (1750s), and had earlier been labelled (as 'Neutoun') on Timothy Pont's map (1590s). That settlement had all but disappeared by the time area was developed as a mining village in the late 19th century. Rows of miners' cottages were built along with local schools, churches and shops. There were several collieries in the vicinity and large bings appeared on the landscape. The village reached its greatest extent around 1910. The parish town of Cambuslang also became heavily industrialised and grew substantially in population.

Since 1849 the area had been served by a train station, and when this was replaced in 1873 it coincided with the opening of the large Hallside steelworks. However, unlike nearby districts also served by stations on the same lines such as Uddingston, Kirkhill and Burnside, Newton did not become a railway commuter suburb for Glasgow at that time.

The village and mines only occupied a small part of the district. The majority of land was occupied by the fields of Newton Farm bounded by the River Clyde to the north, as well as a small country estate centred around Newton House (this was approached by a bridge across Newton Burn and a tree-lined driveway, with the original mansion dating from the 1600s and the last version built in 1825), and a smaller farm called Ridleywood/Redlawood.

=== Post-war decline ===
In common with much of post-industrial Scotland, in the years after World War II the landscape of Newton changed considerably.

The mining industry declined and the pits closed, with the industrial areas becoming overgrown, and the miners' cottages were demolished in the 1960s; the remaining residents were rehoused in new developments on the other side of Cambuslang such as Cairns and Springhall. The Hallside Steelworks also closed down during the 1970s. Most of the civic amenities and shops closed their doors and the premises were knocked down, leaving derelict 'gap sites' which are still present today; however, St Charles' Primary School remained in operation.

Newton House was eventually abandoned and demolished around 1950, and Newton Farm ceased operations in the early 2000s, leaving its fields and buildings neglected. A small isolated group of modern houses were added on the footprint of the miners rows in the mid-1980s, with the streets named Redlawood after the neighbouring farm which had also been bulldozed.

The presence of an electricity generating station nearby resulted in the area being criss-crossed with large electricity pylons and wires, but other than that the land had almost reverted to its original unoccupied rural state after such changes during the previous decades.

=== Modern Suburb, Phase 1 ===
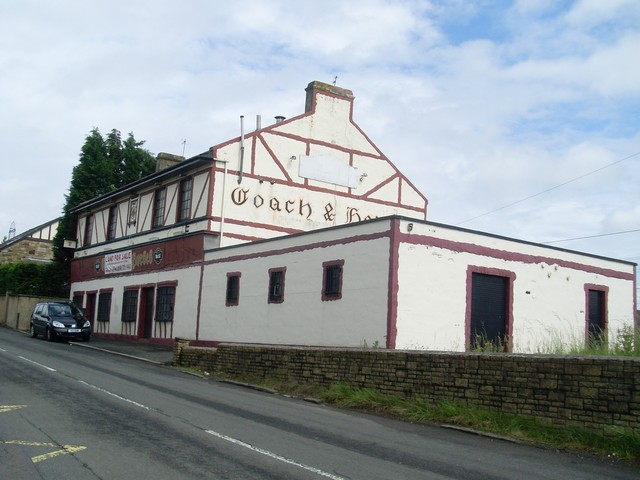
Local pub, then closed and known as the Coach & Horses, now re-opened as the Newton Arms, 2009

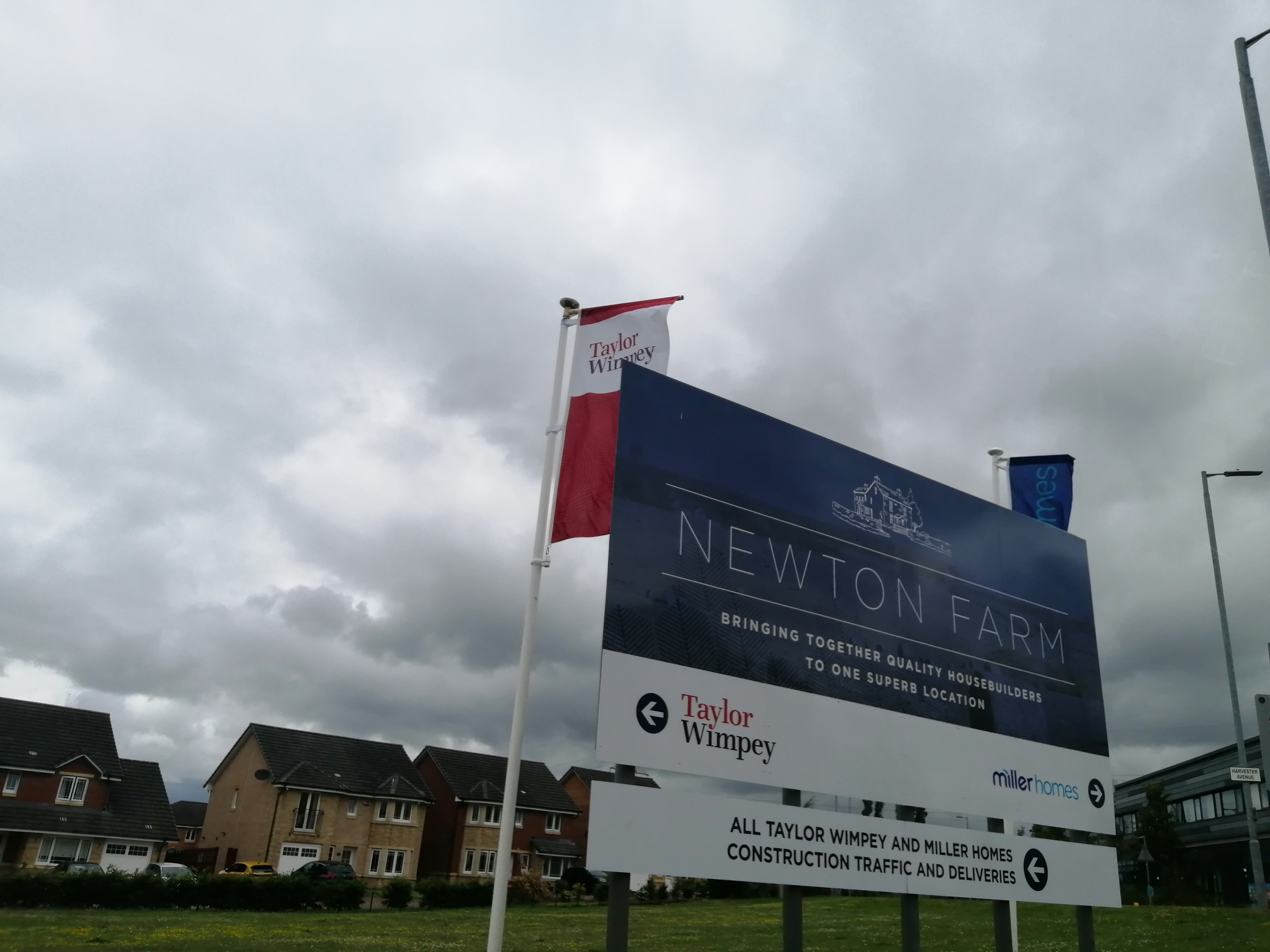
Newton Farm sign, 2021

In the early part of the 21st Century, plans were made to transform Newton into a Community Growth Area with 2100 new houses to be constructed over the following 20 years as well as a local retail centre and new education and community resources.

The first phase of development began in 2006 near to the train station with housing (by Bellway and Taylor Wimpey). A replacement campus was built for St Charles' Primary School, opening in 2011, and later further housing areas (by Taylor Wimpey, Persimmon and Miller Homes) concluded 'Phase 1' of the development in 2015 with about 600 homes constructed. The street names were themed on aspects of farming and rural life.

Around the same time the Newton Arms public house (originally dating from 1895) re-opened following a programme of refurbishment, providing a gathering point for the growing population which was otherwise lacking in the development.

Civic improvements were also made in 'Newton Village' – the small group of houses at Redlawood Road – including upgraded gym equipment at the local playpark and a small memorial garden reflecting the mining history of the area.

=== Modern Suburb, Phase 2 ===
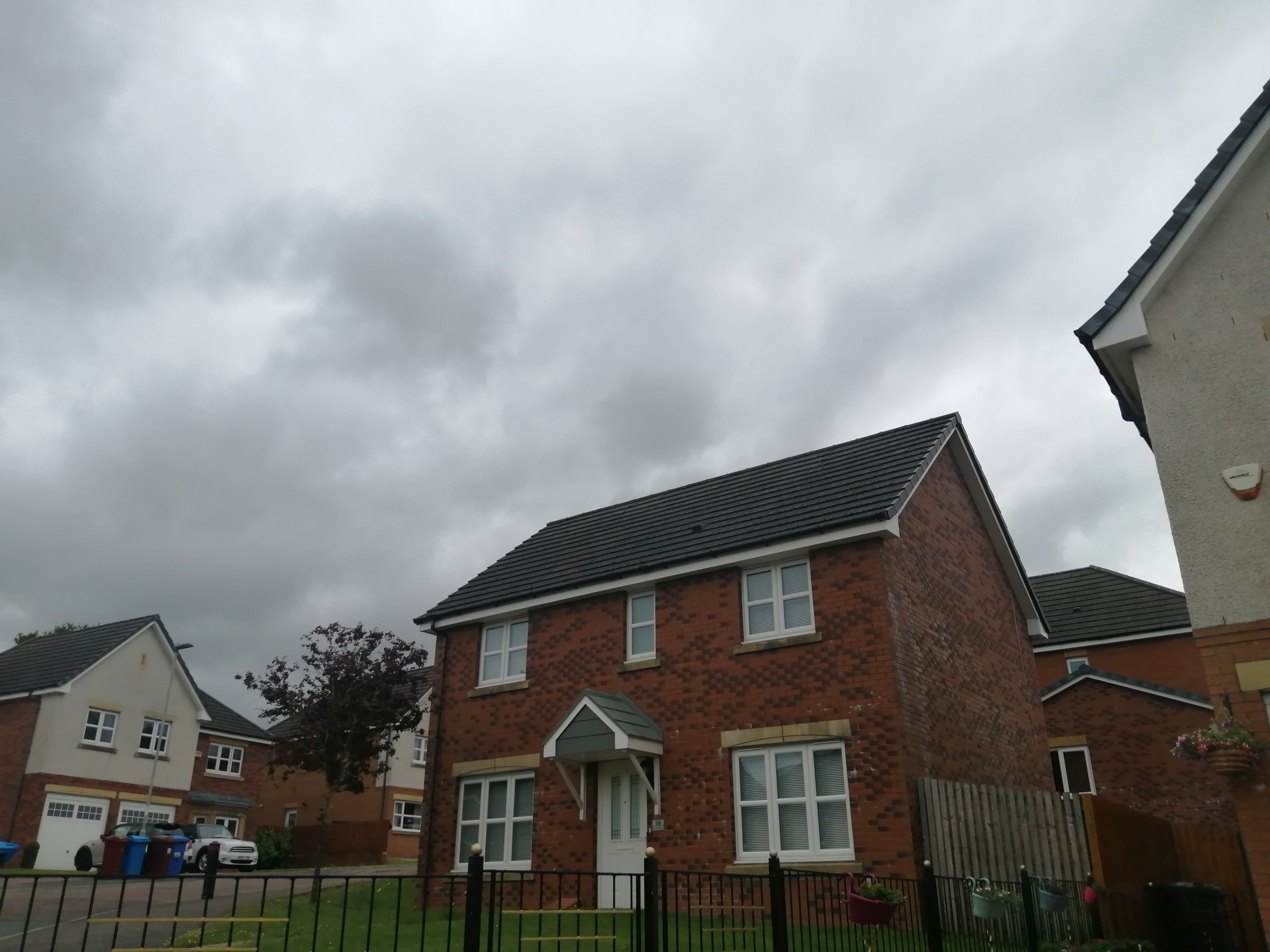
Newton houses, 2021

Newton Farm Phase 2 commenced in 2015. The first stage of construction included 600 houses and, at a cost of £13.4m, a new nondenominational primary school with a 3G football pitch and nursery class (opened August 2017) roughly where the buildings of Newton Farm itself previously stood. Barratt Developments, Miller Homes and Taylor Wimpey are the house builders involved – the latter firm is also in overall control of the whole project.

Future development scheduled for the next 10 years, involving another 900 houses and two local parks, was to encompass land on the site of Newton House, with the main road completing a 'loop' back to the railway station. With development having moved north towards the Clyde by 2019, some residents there complained of regular and strong unpleasant smells emanating from the Daldowie area on the opposite side of the river, which contains a sewage treatment plant, waste-to-fuel facility, landfill site and crematorium. A retail zone for the district was also zoned to be built close to the station; however for several years there was no confirmation as to when this commercial area would be completed, what exact design it would have, or what businesses would be tenants. A planning application was formally submitted in September 2022.

The secluded area around the footbridge to Westburn was a congregating point for local youths for many years, with antisocial behaviour often resulting – this continued after the surrounding land was dug up and fenced off for housebuilding, and after public gatherings were banned during the COVID-19 pandemic in Scotland. The adjacent hill, not designated for housing, was approved in 2021 for use by Taylor Wimpey to deposit quantities of soil, eventually to be landscaped with new tree planting, despite over 50 complaints from local residents over the disruption to existing wildlife and vegetation in the short term.

The area has much in common with many modern developments, with the houses often constructed by the same builders. A nearby example is Broomhouse, Glasgow, also a large suburban 'Community Growth Area' on green belt land, based around a small mining community with a few relic buildings including a pub, on the site of a demolished country house, traversed by pylons (on the same line), bounded by a minor river and a railway with a station, with few local amenities but close to established suburbs which provide these. Broomhouse is less than a mile north of Newton as the crow flies, with Daldowie between the two locations; however the communities are separated by the motorway and the river and have no direct transport links.

== Amenities ==
=== Education ===
Until Newton Farm Primary School opened in 2017, parents in the area who did not wish their children to receive a Catholic education at local St Charles' Primary had to utilise Cairns Primary in the Halfway district of Cambuslang, as the closer schools in the Drumsagard district (Hallside and Park View) were already at capacity due to the considerable amount of new housing in that area in recent years. Even after the school opened, many families opted to keep their children at Cairns to avoid disrupting their routines.

In 2018, it was announced that St Charles' (which opened its new buildings in 2011 and had already installed additional Portakabin classrooms in 2015) would be extended further to accommodate five more new classrooms, with the local authority seemingly unprepared for the continued increase in pupil numbers despite the nature of the growth at Newton being scheduled for several years and the house builders aiming to attract families with young children. In November 2019, it was confirmed that Newton Farm Primary would also require temporary classrooms costing £500,000 after the council's estimated pupil numbers fell far short of the reality. A permanent seven-classroom extension costing over £4 million was approved for immediate construction in May 2021 (at which time the school was reported as the third-most oversubscribed in Scotland, with an original pupil capacity of around 400 but a roll of over 600) and was completed officially in November 2022.

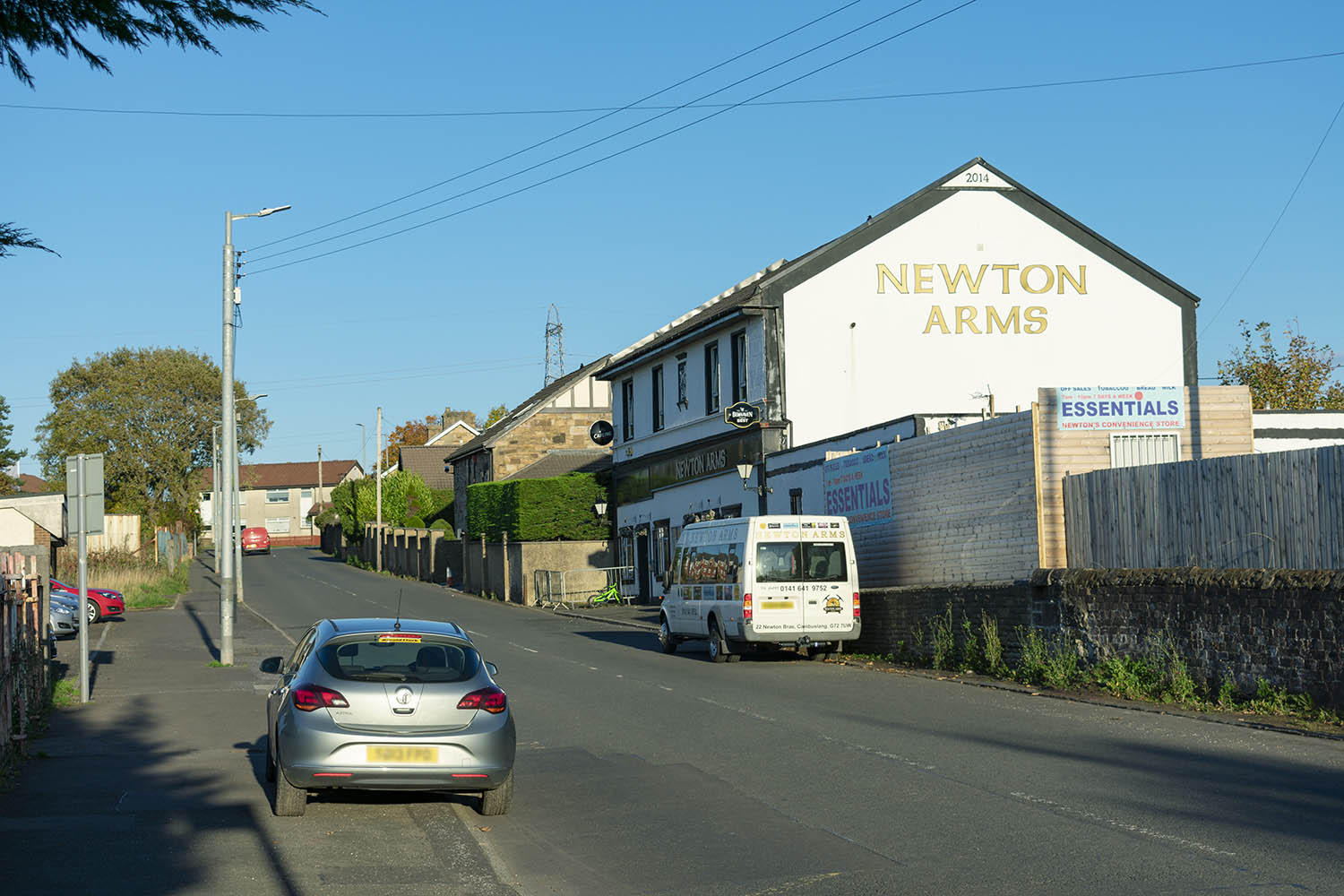
Newton Arms pub with small amenities shop, 2018

There are no secondary schools in Newton. Pupils who attend St Charles' Primary transfer to Trinity High School while pupils at Newton Farm Primary transfer to Uddingston Grammar School. The situation has proven controversial, due to pupils from schools in Drumsagard being allocated to both Cathkin High School (nominally in Cambuslang but a considerable distance from both Drumsagard and Newton) and to Stonelaw High School in Rutherglen due to capacity issues, which some parents felt would cause splits in the community of Cambuslang. A similar situation occurred in 2022 due to Newton Farm's capacity problem, with councillors voting to rezone not only Westburn but also streets within the south-west of Newton Farm to Hallside Primary (now with space after the initial wave of children in Drumsagard aged) and Cathkin High schools.

The Newton Farm Primary School project completed in 2017 also included a nursery provision for 3/4 year olds. In addition to this, plans were presented to the local authority in August 2018 for the construction of a standalone nursery facility on the vacant land at Newton Brae (once occupied by St Charles Primary School) anticipated to be built over the following two years. Construction on the facility, to be named Millburn Early Learning and Childcare Unit, began in October 2019; the nursery opened in December 2020.

=== Commerce ===
Currently the only shop in Newton itself is a small convenience store attached to the public house, plus a hairdresser and MOT garage. There is a licensed grocer and post office in Westburn and a neighbourhood retail zone at the south of Drumsagard, albeit these are both a considerable walking distance for many residents – e.g. Westburn store is 1.2 miles (2 km) from Newton Farm Primary school, and Drumsagard shops 1.9 miles (3 km) from the same location. Halfway and Cambuslang Main Street have typical general shopping facilities, as well as the closest places of worship for various denominations. There is a modern industrial estate near Westburn.

Newton residents operating home businesses (as well as the many recreational users streaming television services etc.) experienced problems with Broadband Internet access speeds, as the roadside cabinets which supplied the services became oversubscribed due to the number of new homes built in the previously rural location without any expansion of the relevant infrastructure. In 2017, the availability to existing streets was improved by the Openreach operator after the matter was highlighted in the UK Parliament by the sitting MP Margaret Ferrier. However, the issue would become apparent again every time another cluster of homes was completed in the ongoing building work in the area, with little consideration given to future significant increases in broadband capacity requirements, requiring both Ferrier's successor Ged Killen and the local MSP Clare Haughey to give the matter their attention due to the volume of complaints received from constituents.

=== Transport ===
Newton railway station is a busy stop for local services linking Glasgow and Lanarkshire on two different lines (Cathcart Circle Lines and Argyle Line). Additionally, high-speed trains on the West Coast Main Line pass Newton on separate tracks which are also used by the suburban Shotts Line, meaning several trains of various types can be seen and heard each hour throughout the day. The three bridges (unused, WCML, local) over Newton Station Road just west of the station were refurbished over the course of four months in 2021, at a cost of £800,000 – the station remained in operation but the access road between Newton and Drumsagard was closed to all vehicles.

The nearest connecting stations to Newton are Rutherglen and Cambuslang to the west and Blantyre to the east on the Argyle line, and Kirkhill on the westbound Cathcart Circle line – Newton is the east terminus for this line. Other nearby stations on different lines are Carmyle (common link at Rutherglen) and Uddingston (common link at Cambuslang).

Bus provision is fairly limited as of 2022. The First Glasgow 7A service (to/from Summerston via Rutherglen and Glasgow city centre) has its terminus near Newton station, as does the 364 (to/from Parkhead), but the former is indirect and the latter an infrequent service. The major 267 First route to Lanarkshire travels through Cambuslang and Halfway but at its closest point is a considerable walking distance from Newton: Halfway Park bus stop is 1.7 miles (3 km) from Newton Farm Primary School.

The opening of the M74 Motorway extension between Cambuslang and Tradeston in Glasgow in 2011 introduced a quick route to and from the Newton area. Motorway connections heading south towards Hamilton and England, or towards northern (M73/M80) or eastern Scotland (M8) have been in place for some years. For visitors unfamiliar with the local road network, Junction 2A (Cambuslang/Tollcross) is the most suitable exit as it serves both north and southbound lanes. On suburban roads, generally drivers should follow signs for Cambuslang and then Halfway or Westburn – Newton itself is seldom signposted due to its small population until recently.

=== Recreation ===
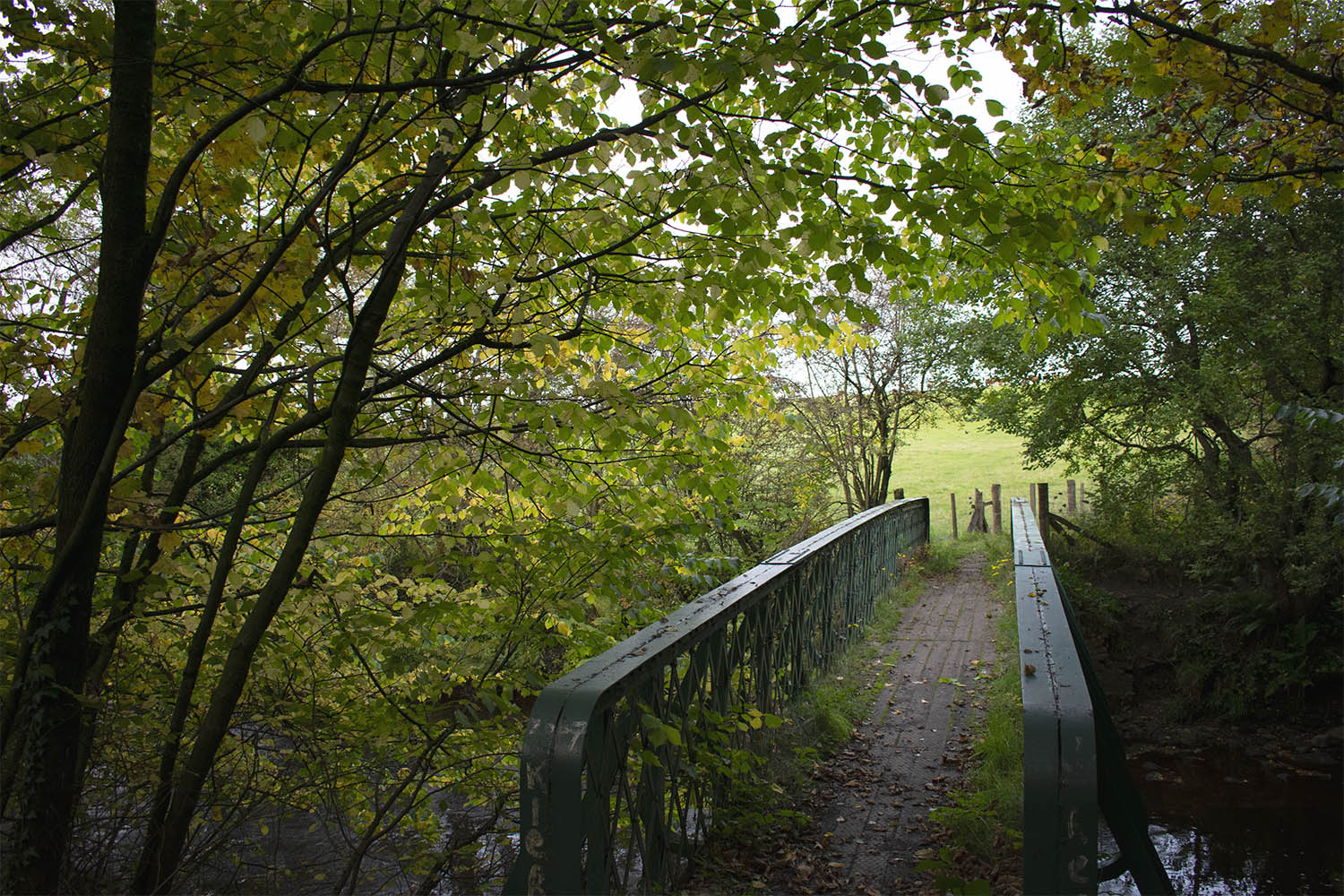
Footbridge over the Rotten Calder on the Clyde Walkway, 2018

Sport in Newton includes bookings of the football pitches by casual groups and local amateur/youth teams, fitness classes held in the school halls on evenings and weekends and a road running club established in 2016. Westburn Hall is another community facility nearby and there are numerous participation and spectator sports organisations based in Cambuslang and Blantyre. The main recreational features of note in the area are National Cycle Route 75 (Glasgow–Edinburgh) which runs through Westburn as a standalone tarmac cycle path, then switches onto the main roads and runs parallel with the railway line past Newton and towards Uddingston;

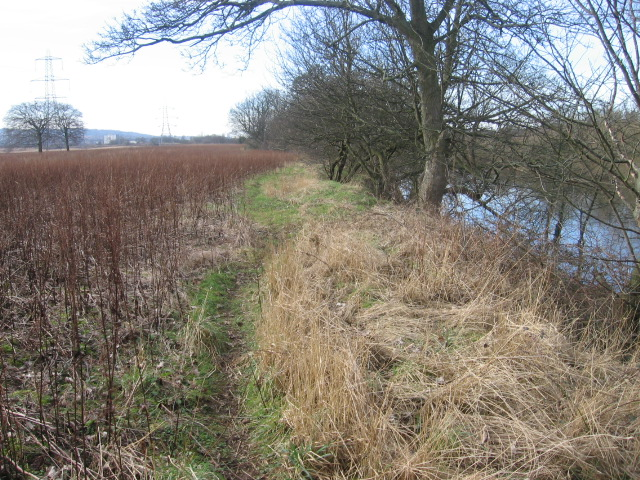
View looking west on the Clyde Walkway, 2007

the Clyde Walkway (Glasgow-Lanark) runs alongside the River Clyde to the north of Newton and skirts new housing and woodland (access points at Clover Crescent, Buttercup Crescent and Honeysuckle Drive) before joining the footpath down to the Rotten Calder and across a footbridge leading on to Uddingston; a basic grass football field and goals in Newton Village, with an 'outdoor gym' and enclosed play area for young children, and further play areas at Shepherds Way, Foxglove Grove, Honeysuckle Drive and Fallow Grove (the latter on the site of Redlawood Farm).

The areas of grassland and woods around Newton are home to various bird and animal species, including a herd of roe deer which are sighted on a regular basis in various locations by residents; these habitats are sometimes disrupted by the ongoing housebuilding work.

During World War II, an Anti-aircraft battery and associated camp for military personnel known as the 'Whins' or 'Blantyreferme' was set up on open land off the Blantyre Farm Road between Newton and Blantyre, 1.3 miles (2 km) from Newton; the camp was used as emergency accommodation after the conflict, but the huts were later demolished. However, some of the AA battery buildings survived into the 21st century (albeit heavily vandalised in some cases) and were incorporated – along with a former clay quarry nearby – into the landscape of Redlees Urban Park developed by the local council.

== People from Newton ==
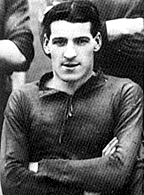
Donald McKinlay

- Jeremiah Kelly, footballer (Ayr United, Everton etc.)
- Sheldon B. Govier, footballer (USA National Soccer Hall of Fame member)
- William McAulay, footballer (Aberdeen etc.)
- Hugh McIver, soldier killed in World War I, recipient of Victoria Cross medal
- Donald McKinlay, footballer (Liverpool and Scotland)
- Davie Wilson, footballer (Rangers and Scotland)

== See also ==
- Noddy housing
