= Peacock Cross railway station =

Disused railway station in Hamilton, South Lanarkshire

Peacock Cross

General information
- Location: Hamilton, South Lanarkshire; Scotland
- Coordinates: 55.7769°N 4.0568°W
- Grid reference: NS710556
- Platforms: 2

Other information
- Status: Disused

History
- Original company: North British Railway
- Pre-grouping: North British Railway

Key dates
- 1 November 1878: Opened as Hamilton Peacocks Cross
- 1882: Name changed to Peacock Cross
- 1 January 1917: Closed
Location

Peacock Cross railway station served the town of Hamilton, South Lanarkshire, Scotland, from 1878 to 1917 on the Glasgow, Bothwell, Hamilton and Coatbridge Railway.

== History ==
The station opened as Hamilton Peacock Cross on 1 November 1878 by the North British Railway. Nearby were various collieries nearby: Allanshaw, Fairhill, Cadzow and Bent collieries. However, the station only served Allanshaw colliery. To the east was Allanshaw signal box. The station's name changed to Peacock Cross in 1882. It closed on 1 January 1917.

Preceding station	Disused railways	Following station
Burnbank; Line and station closed	North British Railway; Glasgow, Bothwell, Hamilton and Coatbridge Railway	Hamilton (NBR); Line and station closed
