= Broomhouse, Glasgow =

Coordinates: 55°50′19″N 4°06′44″W

Broomhouse
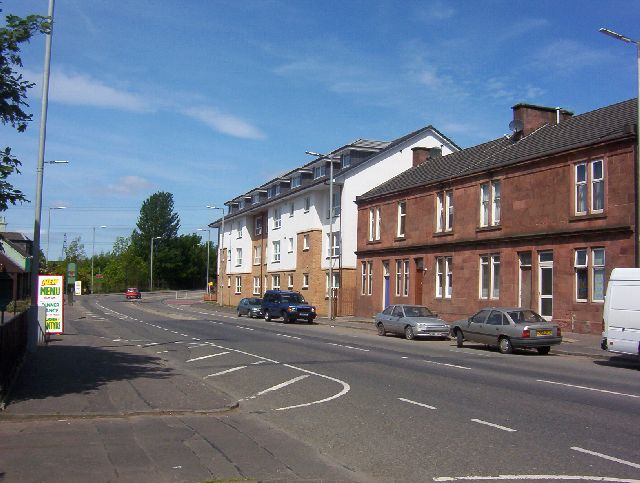

- Location within the Glasgow City council area Location within Scotland
- OS grid reference: NS677626
- Council area: Glasgow City
- Lieutenancy area: Glasgow
- Country: Scotland
- Sovereign state: United Kingdom
- Post town: GLASGOW
- Postcode district: G71 7
- Dialling code: 0141
- Police: Scotland
- Fire: Scottish
- Ambulance: Scottish
- UK Parliament: Glasgow East
- Scottish Parliament: Glasgow Shettleston

Broomhouse is a residential area in Glasgow, Scotland. It is about six miles (ten kilometres) east of the city centre. Historically a small mining village and later the site of the Glasgow Zoo, in the early 21st century it grew substantially as an affluent commuter suburb.

Although close to Baillieston and within the Glasgow boundaries, the neighbourhood has a G71 postcode which has often led to it being associated with Uddingston, the main town for that district which is about 1 1/2 miles (2.5 kilometres) southeast in the South Lanarkshire local authority area.

== Location ==
Broomhouse is in the south-east of the Glasgow city area. It is bounded to the north by a railway line (historically part of the Rutherglen and Coatbridge Railway) which divides its territory with that of Bailleston, while to the south the M74 motorway separates it from Daldowie.

A large quarry and landfill occupy the land to the west (some of which is in the process of being reclaimed as a community woodland). The North Calder Water, which flows into the River Clyde nearby, is the eastern boundary of the neighbourhood as well as that of Glasgow, with North Lanarkshire and the M73 motorway beyond.

== History ==
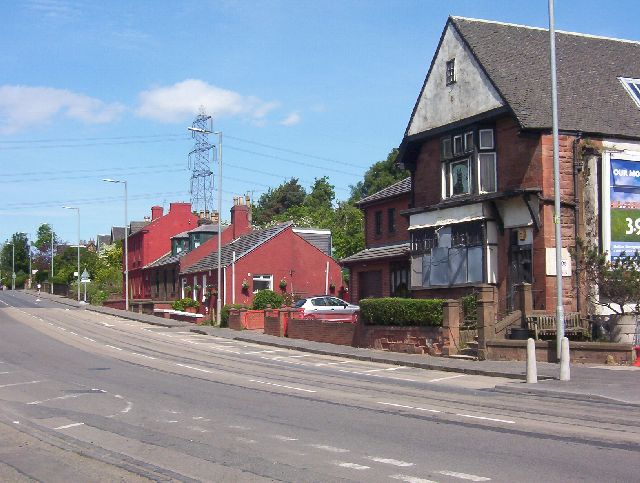
Buildings from the mining village era on Hamilton Road, including the former post office (right) which has since been demolished

The area was home to a mining community in the late 1800s and early 1900s, with several pits in the local area. The few buildings surviving from that era are situated on the A74 (Hamilton Road), including the local public house, The Mailcoach, deriving its name from the fact that this was historically the main route taken by such wagons between Glasgow and England until the construction of the motorway in the late 20th century – due to its importance, it was better maintained than most roads of the time. There was another tavern across the street, Smugglers Inn, but this did not survive into the 21st century. As the mining industry declined in the 1930s, a small housing development (comprising mainly cottage flats) with a community hall and park was established.

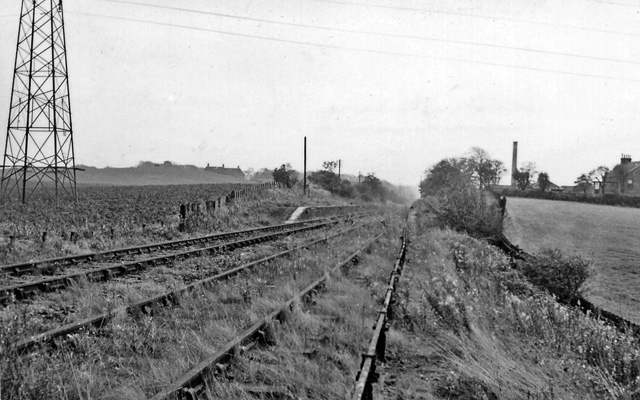
Remains of Broomhouse station, 1961

The district was also served by Broomhouse railway station, from 1878 to 1927 for passengers, on the Glasgow, Bothwell, Hamilton and Coatbridge Railway line, which connected to the Coatbridge Branch (NBR) line (today's North Clyde Line) at Shettleston. The station was located next to Boghall, another mining hamlet (today the location of the Dogs Trust regional headquarters) to the west of the original Broomhouse village. The remains of the former Mount Vernon Sports Stadium (used for greyhound racing) are also located in that area. The railway line closed in 1961, soon after nationalisation, due to the downturn in the local industries it served and the presence of the Rutherglen and Coatbridge line nearby, now owned by the same organisation rather than a competitor.

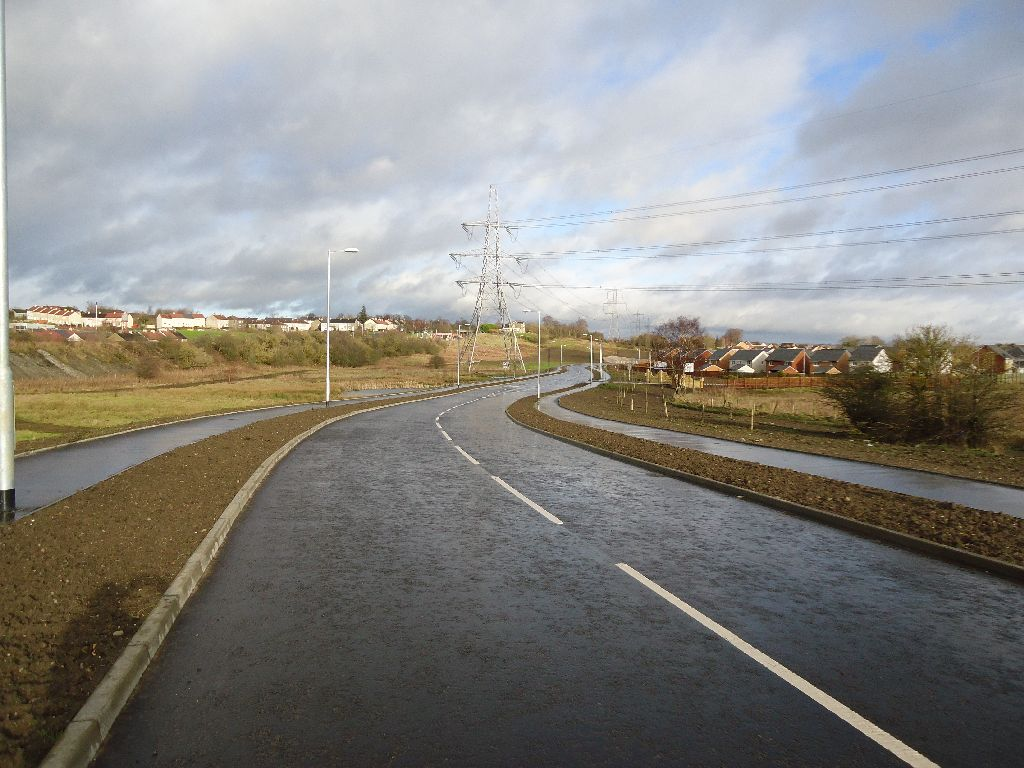
Realigned main road though Broomhouse, with new developments to the south (right) and older housing in Baillieston to the north (left)

Two country estates occupied much of the territory. The more northerly of these, overlooking the North Calder Water, was Calderbank House which in 1919 became a maternity hospital – later the annexe of a larger NHS facility at Bellshill – and latterly a care home before its demolition in 2002.

Calderpark House, situated roughly at the same location as the public park, was linked to the powerful families who owned the adjacent Daldowie estate. However, it became unstable due to mining in the vicinity and was demolished in the 1930s. The lands were purchased by the Zoological Society of Glasgow and West of Scotland who by 1947 had transformed the site into Glasgow Zoo (also known as Calderpark Zoo). Calderpark Halt station for customers was opened in 1951 before the line closed to passengers in 1955, just a few years later. The attraction ceased operations in 2003 amid financial problems, with the enclosures and outbuildings left abandoned for several years.

Administratively, Broomhouse was part of the Old Monkland district of Lanarkshire until the 1974 reorganisation when it was absorbed into Glasgow (along with Baillieston, Cambuslang and Rutherglen) under the Strathclyde region.

== Modern suburb ==
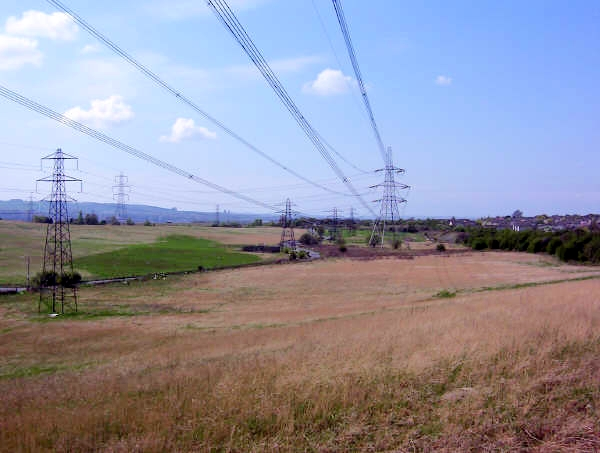
view over farmland looking west in 2004 – this view changed considerably over the next decade

In the early 21st century, Broomhouse was designated as a "Community Growth Area" by a Glasgow 'City Development Plan' identifying areas of green belt which would be suitable to rezone for housing needs. Following this designation, building work was carried out continuously by various developers for the next decade, encompassing the land where Calderbank House and Calderpark/Glasgow Zoo stood. The housing, mostly in winding streets off two main spine roads, primarily comprises clusters of large villas designed for families with cars.

At various times, concerns were raised by residents through the local Community Council about the lack of shops in the expanding area, with residents having to travel to Baillieston or Uddingston for grocery shopping and to access medical or educational facilities. Owing to its location close to the motorway on the edge of Glasgow, a budget hotel and restaurant were constructed close to Junction 3A serving the area; these are also near to the existing Mailcoach public house.

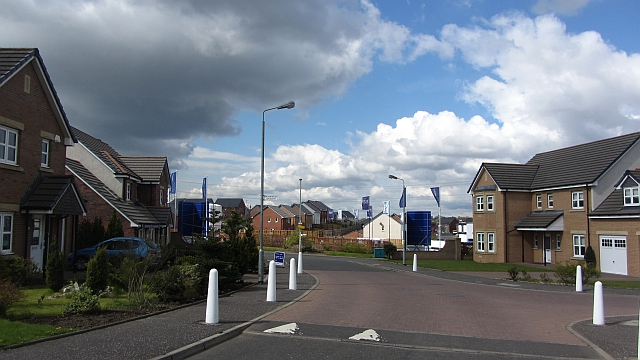
Typical scene of a modern street in Broomhouse (2012)

The area has much in common with many modern developments across the country, with the houses often constructed in the same style by the same builders. A nearby example is Newton, South Lanarkshire, also a large suburban 'Community Growth Area' on green belt land, based around a small mining community, on the site of a demolished country house, traversed by electricity pylons, bounded by a minor river and a railway with a station, with few local amenities other than a pub but relatively close to established suburbs which provide more of these. Newton is less than a mile from Broomhouse to the south as the crow flies; however, the two communities are separated by the motorway and the river and have no direct transport links.

=== Transport ===
The area has been well served for transport since Baillieston railway station was opened in 1993, linking to Glasgow Central and Coatbridge. In 1995 a short extension and junction was built onto the M74 motorway nearby – initially, this was useful for traffic heading south to Lanarkshire and England but had little northbound function, terminating just 2 1/3 miles (3.8 km) away at Auchenshuggle. This changed in 2011 when another extension was completed, providing direct connections to the M8 (central Glasgow, Paisley and Glasgow Airport) and the M77 (Ayrshire).

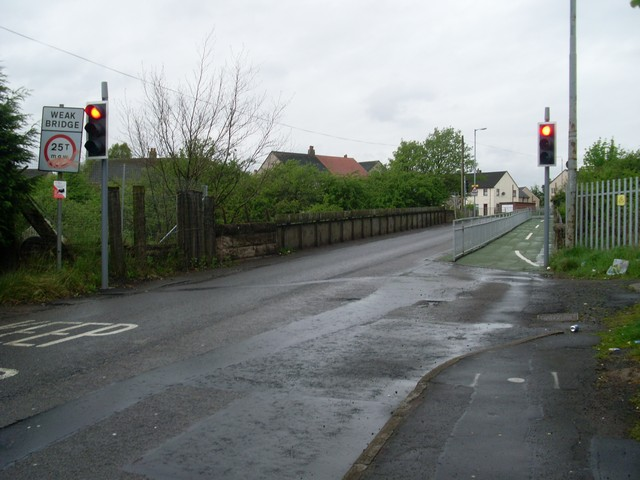
Muirhead Road bridge before it was replaced in 2018

Bus services are limited within the development but prominent on its peripheries. These are provided by First Glasgow, including the '240' service between Glasgow and Motherwell running along Hamilton Road, and the '2' via Shettleston Road which terminates at Baillieston station, both of which are frequent services including a night provision, with the routes merging in the Parkhead area.

The only road access between Broomhouse and Baillieston is via the Muirhead Road Bridge over the railway, which was originally an old structure of a narrow design requiring traffic signals with only a single lane of vehicles able to cross it at a time. As part of the overall plan for the growth of the area, developers agreed to widen and strengthen the bridge. However, this meant it would close for almost a full year, with only pedestrian access across the railway lines during the work. It reopened a few weeks ahead of schedule in August 2018.

=== Education ===
There are no schools within Broomhouse. The nearest primary schools are Caledonian P.S. and St Francis of Assisi R.C. P.S. in south Baillieston, accessible to pedestrians via a railway underpass to the north-west of the modern housing which is prone to flooding; these are feeders for Bannerman High School and St Andrew's Secondary School, Glasgow respectively.

=== Recreation ===
There are no sporting facilities in the neighbourhood other than a few children's play areas. But, as part of the masterplan deal for the land, developers agreed to provide funds to upgrade the basic facilities at James Lindsay Memorial Park in Baillieston (which is also where the closest supermarket is located). However, by 2018 no improvements had been carried out to the park with the housebuilding ongoing.

Broomhouse is to the immediate west of Calderbraes Golf Club, which forms part of the decreasing green belt separating Glasgow from settlements in Lanarkshire.

== Notable residents ==
- Nicola Sturgeon, former First Minister of Scotland, lived in the area.
- Donald McKinlay, who was captain of Liverpool F.C. in the 1920s, was born in the mining hamlet of Boghall although spent some of his childhood in Newton and moved to England while still a teenager.
- Tom Boyd, captain of Celtic F.C. in the 1990s, was raised in the Broomhouse neighbourhood.

== See also ==
- Noddy housing
