= Hamilton railway station (North British Railway) =

Former railway station in Scotland

Coordinates: 55.776911°N 4.044685°W

Hamilton

General information
- Location: Hamilton, Lanarkshire; Scotland
- Platforms: 2

Other information
- Status: Disused

History
- Original company: Glasgow, Bothwell, Hamilton and Coatbridge Railway
- Pre-grouping: North British Railway
- Post-grouping: London and North Eastern Railway

Key dates
- 1 April 1878: Opened
- 1 January 1917: Temporarily closed
- 2 June 1919: Reopened
- 15 September 1952: Permanently closed
Location

Hamilton railway station was one of several railway stations to serve the town of Hamilton, Scotland. It was opened on 1 April 1878 by the Glasgow, Bothwell, Hamilton and Coatbridge Railway. It was operated by the North British Railway, which under the Railways Act 1921 became part of the London and North Eastern Railway. The station was temporarily closed from 1 January 1917, reopening on 2 June 1919.

On 1 January 1948, the Transport Act 1947 took effect, and all main line railways in Britain were nationalized and became part of British Railways. British Railways closed the station, and others on the line for good on 15 September 1952. Almost no trace of the station's existence remains, however, there is a bridge on Union Street which the line passed under, located near the site of the old station.

Hamilton today is served by three stations on the Argyle Line. Services are provided by ScotRail.

Preceding station	Historical railways	Following station
Peacock Cross	Glasgow, Bothwell, Hamilton and Coatbridge Railway; North British Railway	Terminus
