= Bothwell railway station =

Disused railway station in Bothwell, South Lanarkshire

Bothwell
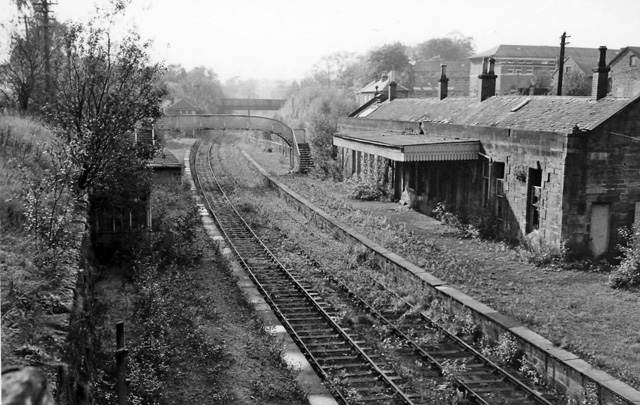
- The site of the station in 1961

General information
- Location: Bothwell, South Lanarkshire; Scotland, United Kingdom
- Coordinates: 55.8041°N 4.0711°W
- Grid reference: NS702586
- Platforms: 2

Other information
- Status: Disused

History
- Original company: North British Railway
- Pre-grouping: North British Railway
- Post-grouping: London and North Eastern Railway; British Railways (Scottish Region)

Key dates
- 1 April 1878: Opened
- 1 January 1917: Closed
- 2 June 1919: Reopened
- 4 July 1955: Closed to passengers
- 6 June 1961: Closed to goods
Location

Bothwell railway station served the village of Bothwell, South Lanarkshire, Scotland from 1878 to 1955 on the Glasgow, Bothwell, Hamilton and Coatbridge Railway.

== History ==
The station opened on 1 April 1878 by the North British Railway. To the south were sidings to Bothwell Castle Colliery, with the colliery to the west of the station. These were controlled by Bothwell Station signal box, which was replaced in 1896. The station closed on 1 January 1917 but reopened on 2 June 1919, before closing permanently to passengers on 4 July 1955. It closed to goods on 6 June 1961.

Preceding station	Disused railways	Following station
Uddingston East; Line and station closed	North British Railway; Glasgow, Bothwell, Hamilton and Coatbridge Railway	Burnbank; Line and station closed
