= Calderpark Halt railway station =

Disused railway station in Scotland

Calderpark Halt

General information
- Location: Baillieston, Glasgow; Scotland
- Coordinates: 55.837°N 4.110°W
- Platforms: 2

Other information
- Status: Disused

History
- Original company: British Railways

Key dates
- 5 July 1951: Opened as Calderpark Halt
- 4 July 1955: Closed
Location

Calderpark Halt railway station or Calderpark for Glasgow Zoo (NS679625) served Calderpark Zoo opened in 1947 on the old estate of Calderpark and the Baillieston area of Glasgow, Scotland on the Glasgow, Bothwell, Hamilton and Coatbridge Railway between Shettleston and Hamilton. Glasgow Zoo closed in 2003.

== History ==
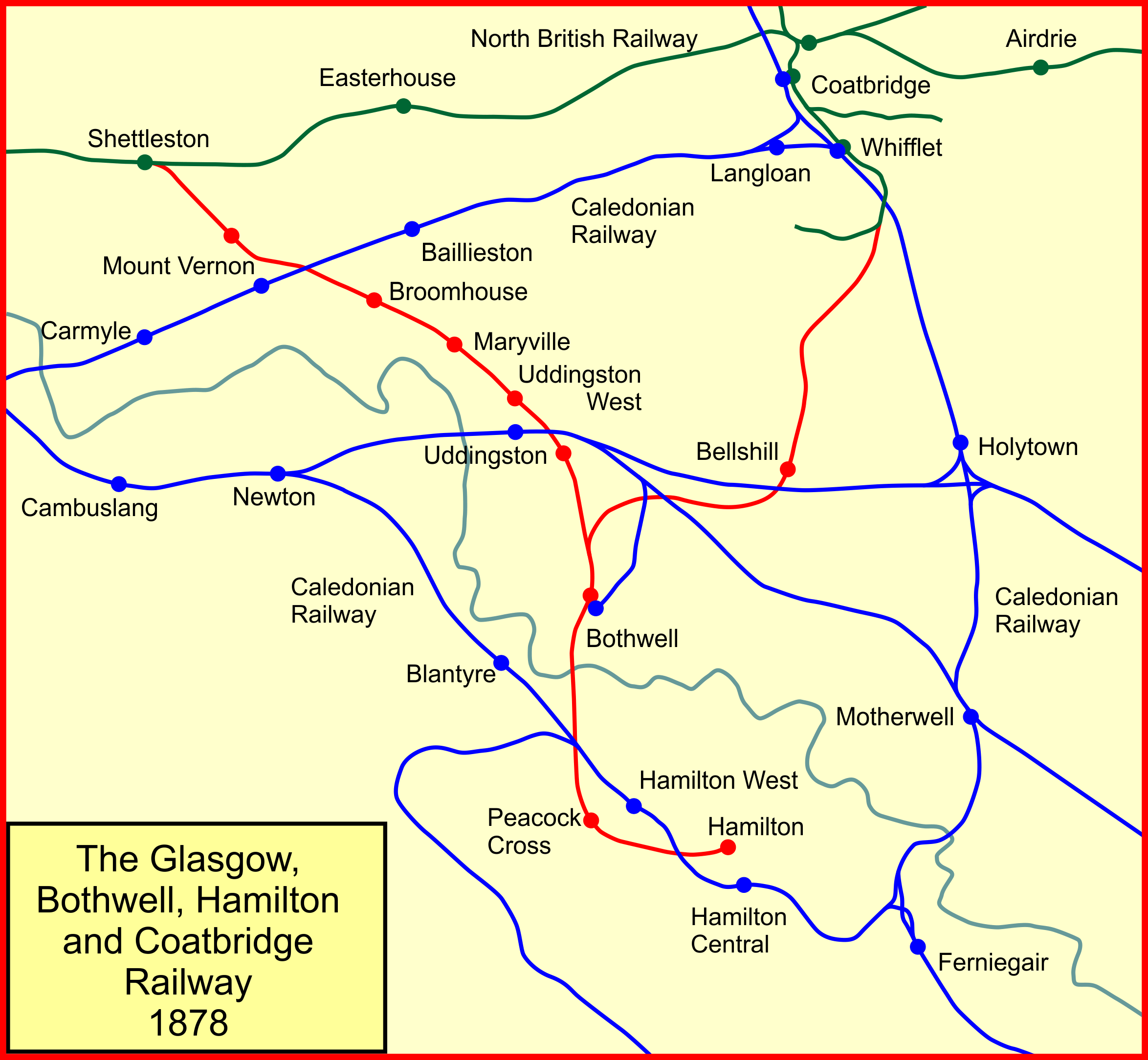
Map of the GBH&CR before the halt was opened.

The halt was opened by the British Transport Commission to serve Glasgow Zoo in 1951 on the Glasgow, Bothwell, Hamilton and Coatbridge Railway route by Mrs Cameron wife of British Railway's Chief Regional Officer for the area.

The route was also known as the London and North Eastern Railway's Hamilton Branch. It was closed when the line was closed to passenger traffic on 4 July 1955. The line was closed to freight traffic on 4 October 1964.

=== Infrastructure ===
The halt had a name board that read 'Calderpark for the Zoo', had electric lighting, two concrete platforms with simple brick built shelters and toilets on the northern side with sloping concrete roofing on a double track section of track standing just to the west of the North Calder Viaduct. The Calderpark Viaduct lay to the west. The remains of the halt on the dismantled line are shown with two shelters on the south side of the line in a low cutting just off Baillieston Road.

=== Remains on site ===
Glasgow Zoo closed in 2003 and eventually the buildings were demolished and replaced by a housing estate (part of Broomhouse). The site of Calderpark Halt has become Calderpark Terrace and the only remains are at the site of the old North Calder Viaduct.

== Services ==
Preceding station	Disused railways	Following station
Broomhouse	North British Railway; Glasgow, Bothwell, Hamilton and Coatbridge Railway	Maryville
