= Jordi Casamitjana =

Catalan animal rights activist and ethical vegan

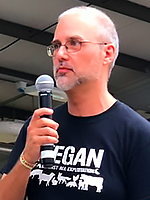
- Born: 1964 (age 61–62); Catalonia
- Occupation: Animal rights activist
- Website: jordi-casamitjana.animal-protection-consult.com

Jordi Casamitjana (born 1964) is a British zoologist, animal protection campaigner, and animal rights activist.

== Biography ==
Casamitjana was born in Catalonia in 1964 but is a British citizen living in the UK since 1993. He identifies as an ethical vegan. In April 2018, he was fired from the League Against Cruel Sports (LACS) after he disclosed to his colleagues that it was investing in firms related to animal testing. Casamitjana claimed that LACS's decision to fire him was based on his ethical vegan belief. LACS said it was because of gross misconduct. He took legal action against LACS, which ended in an out-of-court settlement in his favour. The landmark case confirmed that ethical veganism is protected under the Equality Act 2010 in the UK as a philosophical belief. This was the first time the specific belief of ethical veganism had been legally recognised and protected in any jurisdiction in the world. He is also the author of the book Ethical Vegan: a Personal and Political Journey to Change the World.

== Activism ==
He was heavily involved with the first successful prosecutions under the Hunting Act 2004 and in the ban on bullfighting in Catalonia.

Casamitjana was one of the expert witnesses before several parliaments during the debates that led to the successful passing of animal protection legislation. For instance, on 3 March 2010, he spoke as an ethologist before the Environmental Commission of the Catalan Parliament for the ban of bullfighting in Catalonia. On 22 October 2014, he spoke before the Commission of Agriculture, Livestock, Fisheries, Food and Environment of the Catalan Parliament for the ban on wild animals in circuses. On 13 November 2016, he spoke before the Climate Change, Environment, and Rural Affairs Committee of the Welsh Assembly for the ban of snares. On 21 May 2019, he spoke before the Public Bills Committee of the UK Parliament for the ban of wild animals in circuses.

Casamitjana also helped to close several zoological collections in the UK as part of his anti-zoo campaigning. For example, Glasgow Zoo, and several small petty zoos in the Scottish county of Fife.

Casamitjana has worked as a freelance animal protection consultant, undercover investigator and writer, and as an employee of campaign departments of several animal protection organisations, including the Monkey Sanctuary (Wild Futures), the Born Free Foundation, the League Against Cruel Sports, CAS International, the International Fund for Animal Welfare (IFAW), and People for the Ethical Treatment of Animals (PETA) UK.

== Selected works ==
=== Books ===
- The Demon's Trial (2006)
- Ethical Vegan: A Personal and Political Journey to Change the World (2020)
- Why Vegans Don't. A philosophical guide to vegan behaviour (2025)

=== Academic articles ===
- Eco-ethological Aspects of Polistes (Hymenoptera:Vespidae) in Catalonia (I): Study of the Nest Location of a Semi-urban Population of Polistes dominulus Christ, 1791. Ses.Entom.ICHN-SCL, VI (1989): 87-96'

Ecoethological Aspects of Polistes (Hymenoptera:Vespidae) in Catalonia (II): Study of a Population of Polistes omissus Weyrauch 1939, in a Strelitzia reginae plantation. Ses.Entom. ICHN-SCL, VII (1991): 59-65

- The vocal repertoire of the Woolly Monkey Lagothrix lagothricha. Bioacoustics, 13 (2002): 1-19
