= Stephen St. C. Bostock =

English philosopher, zoologist, and writer (1940–2023)

- Bostock in 1988
- Born: Stephen St. Chad Bostock; 2 March 1940; Northumberland, England
- Died: 5 February 2023 (aged 82); Glasgow, Scotland
- Education: Queens' College, Cambridge (B.A., 1962; M.A., 1973); University of Glasgow (PhD, 1987)
- Occupation(s): Philosopher, zoologist, writer
- Notable work: Zoos and Animal Rights (1993)

Stephen St. Chad Bostock (2 March 1940 – 5 February 2023) was an English philosopher, zoologist and animal rights writer. He was known for his research on animal ethics in relation to zoos and his 1993 book Zoos and Animal Rights.

== Biography ==
Bostock was born in Northumberland in 1940. He obtained a B.A. in 1962 and an M.A. in 1973 from Queens' College, Cambridge. He studied philosophy and zoology at the University of Hull. Bostock obtained a PhD in philosophy from University of Glasgow in 1987. He was the education officer for Glasgow Zoo.

Bostock died in Glasgow on 5 February 2023.

== Zoos and Animal Rights ==
Bostock is best known for his book Zoos and Animal Rights: The Ethics of Keeping Animals, published in 1993. The book argues that animal rights and zoos do not have to be in conflict as the rights of animals held captive in zoos are not infringed upon in zoos with good conditions with their needs catered for. Bostock did not claim that all zoos are acceptable places for animals, they can only be if they provide certain conditions. He defended zoos on conservational, educational, environmental and scientific grounds. He noted that zoo animals are protected from predation. Tzachi Zamir has described the book as an attempt to "forge a link between an animal-right perspective and a welfare-based argument for the existence of (good) zoos".

Bostock assigned moral rights to animals as they are conscious beings. He rejected utilitarianism. However, reviewers of the book noted that his recommendations are indistinguishable from utilitarianism as he concedes that the rights of animals may justifiably be sacrificed if the overall benefit is compelling from a human-interest viewpoint. Bostock argues that the individual well-being of an animal is of paramount importance but stated that "we can still properly use [animals], and keep them, if the animals concerned indicate that this is reasonably beneficial to them". He has written that zoo animals have a right to well-being that enjoins us from causing them loss of freedom, physical pain or death. In regard to loss of freedom he argues that "really good captivity is not, to all intents and purposes, captivity at all" as captive animals in ideal conditions are allowed a continuation of their "natural lives". Bostock defines freedom as "being an environment in which the majority of their needs are catered for". He argues that as the right-to-freedom criterion of zoos can be purportedly met under ideal conditions, thus the rights argument against zoos becomes invalid.

Philosopher Ann S. Causey has written that "Bostock's arguments intended to demonstrate the freedom and well-being of zoo animals are weak and unlikely to convince any but the uniformed or logically lax reader". Doug Simak negatively reviewed the book suggesting that although Bostock argues for animal rights he endorses "rights violations with ease", such as his support for animal culling "to plead necessity". He commented that "it is difficult to see how the plea of necessity is compatible with the view that animals have, in any real sense, rights". In contrast, James Rachels positively reviewed the book, concluding "people on both sides of the animal-rights debate can learn a great deal from Zoos and Animal Rights. Bostock has written a very good book, full of interesting information and moral arguments that deserves to be taken seriously". A. J. Stevens also positively reviewed the book in the Animal Welfare journal.

== Selected publications ==
- Zoos and Animal Rights: The Ethics of Keeping Animals (1993)
- Animal Well-Being in the Wild and in Captivity (1995)
