= Trinity High School, Rutherglen =

Coordinates: 55.82341°N 4.187894°W

Trinity High School

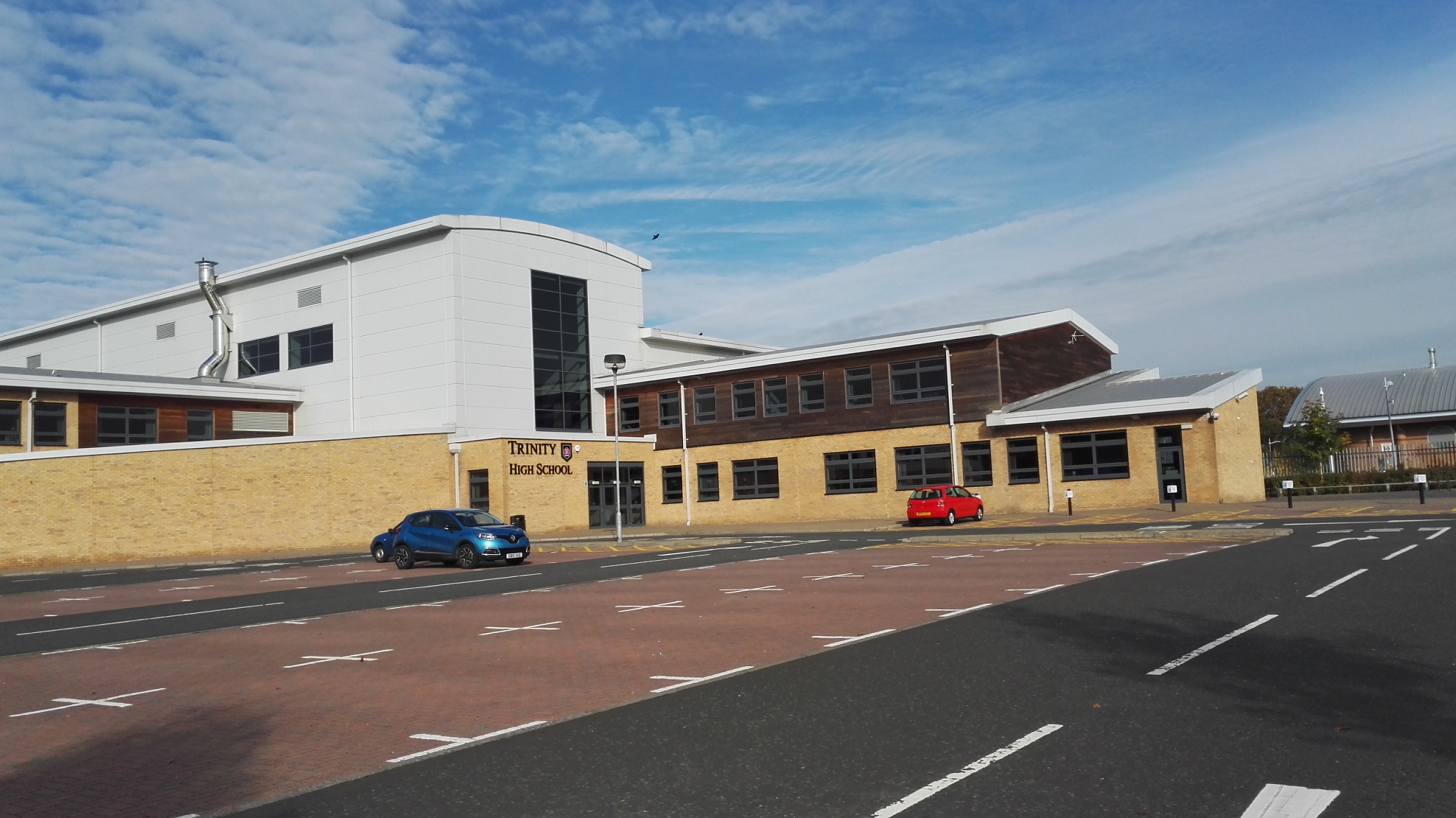
- Main building of school

Location
- Rutherglen; G73; Glasgow; Scotland

Information
- Type: Roman Catholic
- Motto: "Home, school, church, stronger together"
- Established: 1971
- Authority: South Lanarkshire Council
- Headmaster: Carol McArdle
- Scottish Highers: 1st Years – 6th Years
- Gender: Mixed
- Enrollment: 1,060
- Colours: Purple, red, black, white
- Website: Trinity High School

Trinity High School is a Roman Catholic secondary school located in Eastfield, Rutherglen, Scotland near the city of Glasgow. It was established in 1971. The current head teacher since 2024 is Carol McArdle, following on from Allison Craig who had taken office in 2021 following the retirement of Peter Bollen.

== Overview ==
Trinity High School was established in 1971 to provide a combined Catholic secondary education provision for Cambuslang and Rutherglen under the new comprehensive system, until that time based separately in limited accommodation at St Bride's and St Columbkille's schools respectively, but with many pupils from the towns having to attend schools either in Glasgow, further into Lanarkshire at Hamilton or Motherwell, or in East Kilbride. Initially Trinity used buildings in Cambuslang previously used by Gateside School, which had been supplanted as the local non-denominational facility with the opening of Cathkin High School on a different site on the edge of town. In 1977 the Trinity campus at Eastfield was opened, although the Gateside building continued to be used by the school for a few years (it was later used by South Lanarkshire College, and eventually demolished in 2008).

In 2007 the original Trinity was demolished; a new school was completed in the same Glenside Drive location. Pupils returned in August 2009. A council-run sports centre and swimming pool (known as South Lanarkshire Lifestyle Eastfield) constructed a few years earlier shares the site, with the facilities used by the Trinity pupils during the school day and available for community use at other times.

The school uses a traditional house system. The pupils are organised into one of three guidance houses, formerly having been four. The three houses are Iona, Dunkeld and Melrose. Jedburgh was previously a house but was removed during re-organisation of the school faculty.

The school hosts many afterschool clubs and has competed in national competitions. Around mid-October an awards ceremony is held to honour pupils who have achieved academically and through sports activities. Although a Catholic school, it accepts students from other religious denominations.

Trinity's affiliated primary schools include St Anthony's in Springhall, St Bride's in Cambuslang, St Cadoc's in Halfway, St Charles' in Newton, St Columbkille's in Rutherglen, St Joachim's in Carmyle, and St Mark's in Blairbeth.

=== Gallery ===
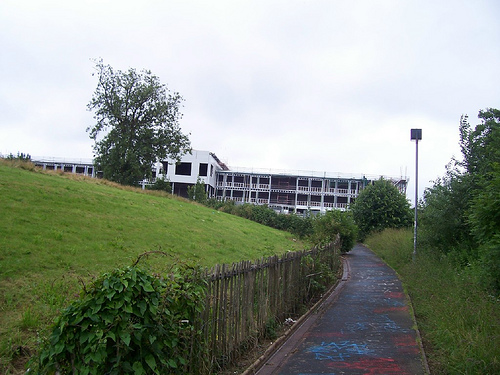
The new school in Glenside Drive during construction in 2008

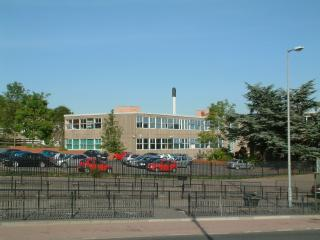
The school premises for 2007 to 2009 (Hamilton)

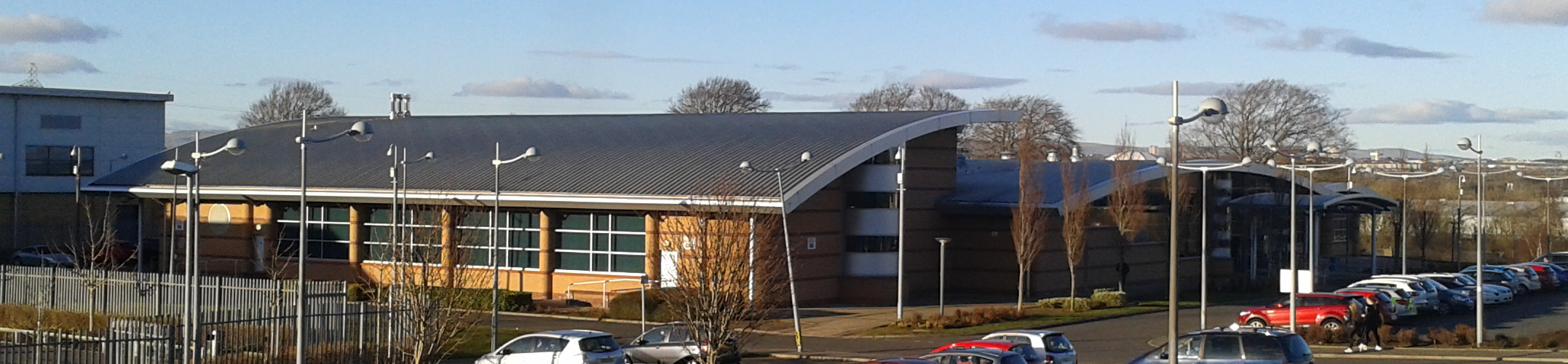
'South Lanarkshire Lifestyle Eastfield' sports centre next to school

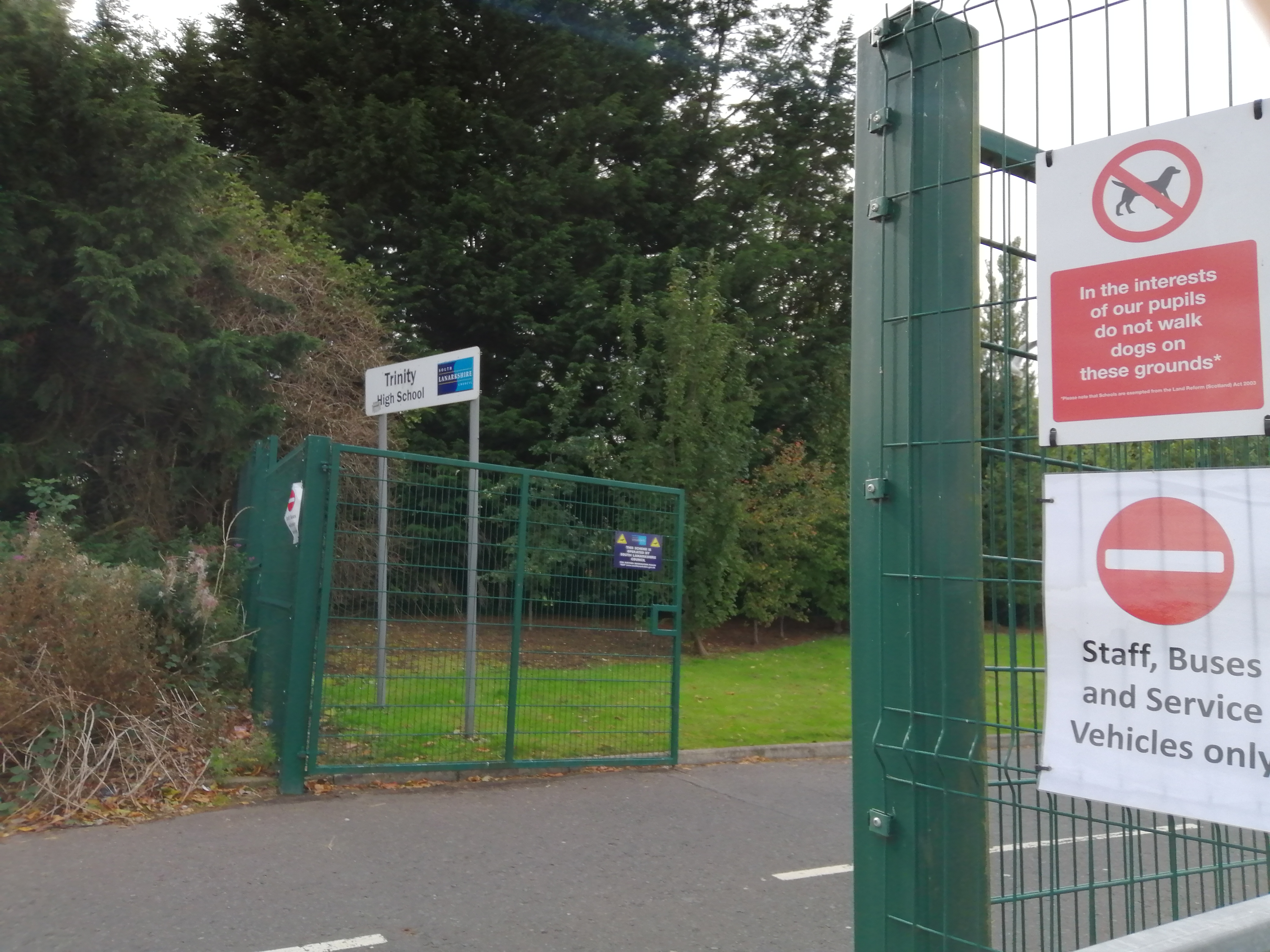
School gate (2020)

== History ==
=== New buildings, move to Hamilton ===
On 5 November 2007 the former school building in Glenside Drive, being demolished as part of the "Schools Modernisation Programme", was set ablaze. Before it was set on fire, it was due to be destroyed by contractors InspirdED onto whom the council had passed responsibility.

The fire broke out in the school on Guy Fawkes Night. A total of eight crews, 60 firefighters in total, worked through the night to control the blaze and by 1:00 AM on Monday morning the fire was finally extinguished. On Bonfire night there were several incidents throughout Scotland in the aftermath of the festival that sparked fires similar to the Trinity School blaze as evidenced by the Strathclyde Fire and Police services, and in addition this gained widespread media attention.

During the complete reconstruction of the school, pupils at Trinity High School were temporarily located at the old Holy Cross High School buildings in Hamilton, with a replacement for Holy Cross having already been completed nearby (these have also since been demolished in the South Lanarkshire Schools Modernisation project).

== Former pupils ==
- Stuart Findlay, footballer
- Scott Harrison, boxer
- Clare Haughey, politician
- Brogan Hay, footballer
- James Kelly, politician
- Ged Killen, politician
- Scott Martin, footballer
- Stephen McKeown, footballer
- Kevin Nisbet, footballer
- Bernard Ponsonby, TV news reporter
- Dom Thomas, footballer
- Andy Walker, footballer
