= Glasgow Zoo =

Zoo in Glasgow, Scotland

- Interactive map of Glasgow Zoo
- 55.839°N 4.108°W
- Date opened: 1947
- Date closed: 25 August 2003
- Location: Baillieston, Scotland
- Land area: 99 acres (40 ha)
- Annual visitors: 140,000
- Major exhibits: Lions, black bears, white rhinos, Capuchin monkeys
- Website: www.glasgowzoo.co.uk

Glasgow Zoo, or Calderpark Zoo, was a 99-acre (40 ha) zoological park in Baillieston, Glasgow, Scotland.

The zoo was established in 1947 by the Zoological Society of Glasgow and West of Scotland, which was itself established in 1936. The zoo was located on the lands of the former Calderpark Estate, and during its peak attracted about 140,000 visitors a year. At the zoo's peak it contained over 600 animals and had 24 full-time and many part-time or seasonal staff.

It closed in August 2003 after running up a debt of around £3.5 million and failing to renew its zookeeper licence, having been unable to meet new standards on animal welfare. In the last few years that it was open, Glasgow Zoo deteriorated mainly due to the lack of funding from the local council and due to many allegations of animal cruelty.

== History ==
=== Founding ===
The Zoological Society of Glasgow was founded on 15 December 1936 by Edward Hindle, who was a professor of zoology at the University of Glasgow. Its name was later changed to the Zoological Society of Glasgow and West of Scotland. The initial proposal was for the zoo to be in Bellahouston Park in 1938, beginning with a four-acre enclosure with expansion as the project went on. This proposal was rejected by the organisers of the exhibition who would fund the zoo, so various other locations were considered; no inner city site was identified as a good build site. At the end of 1938 the Society looked at the Calderpark Estate, two miles beyond the city boundary with a large plot of land available for construction and free-animal enclosures. The society bought the Calderpark Estate in 1939. The property had formerly been farmed by Cistercians, and the original mansion had been demolished a decade earlier when it became unsafe due to subsidence from underground coal mines. The onset of the Second World War led to the opening of the zoo being delayed until 9 July 1947.

When construction began during Britain's recovery period, many of the zoo's buildings were made from old war materials such as the enclosures being built out of concrete roadblocks (designed to hinder tank movements on the chance of invasion), bricks from demolished air raid shelters, and metal from now defunct battleships. However, the estate had remained empty for two decades before the zoo was established. On the year of its opening, many animals were donated from other zoos and enclosures. Soay sheep were supplied from the island of St. Kilda, beforehand owned by the Zoological society president. Dublin Zoo supplied two lion cubs from their recent litters and London Zoo loaned – and then donated – two adult lions to Glasgow Zoo's new enclosures. At the time the prize exhibits were the lions and a rare white peacock – now fairly common – which attracted many people to the zoo, some bringing their own exotic pets to add to the zoo's already expanding collection: these included monkeys, parrots and many other rarer species.

Calderpark for Glasgow Zoo railway station (NS679625) served Calderpark Zoo and was opened in 1951 on the Glasgow, Bothwell, Hamilton and Coatbridge Railway between Shettleston and Hamilton. It closed with the line in 1955. The education officer for Glasgow Zoo was Stephen St. C. Bostock.

=== Last years ===
Due to decreasing levels of revenue and public funding, as well as having to compete with the larger and more successful Edinburgh Zoo, Glasgow Zoo attempted to rent or sell land and animals to try to avoid bankruptcy. Starting in 1999 the zoo tried to sell off its excess to land, but delays in planning permission prevented the sale. In 2000 it started to hire out some of its animals to help raise much needed cash, but drew criticism from animal welfare campaigners.

In 2002, thieves stole two of the zoo's non-poisonous snakes and vandalised a van and the zoo's tea room. Another break-in a few months later resulted in a parrot being stolen from the zoo.

=== Closure ===
The Glasgow Zoo closed on 25 August 2003 despite being to set to close in late September. The zoo closed because of debts of £3.5 million which it accumulated after its public funding stopped in 2000. Animal welfare organisations had concerns about conditions and public safety. During the time before closure, staff from the zoo in tandem with SSPCA workers helped relocate animals to other zoos or enclosures.

Even though the zoological society stated an interest in re-opening the attraction or the creation of a similar attraction on the site, plans were made to clear the land to make way for new homes. The lands of Glasgow Zoo still remain derelict. Nowadays a few traces of the previously prominent zoo remain.

Since the closure of the zoo in 2003, the area and old buildings fell into disrepair with many of the enclosures being burned, demolished or vandalised as well as illegal dumping from nearby developers and constructors causing further damage to the structures to the point where many were unsafe for use. The area was no longer being locked due to extensive damage to the gate and gatehouse (burned to the ground) as well as the rear gate being burst open.

== Animals and exhibits ==
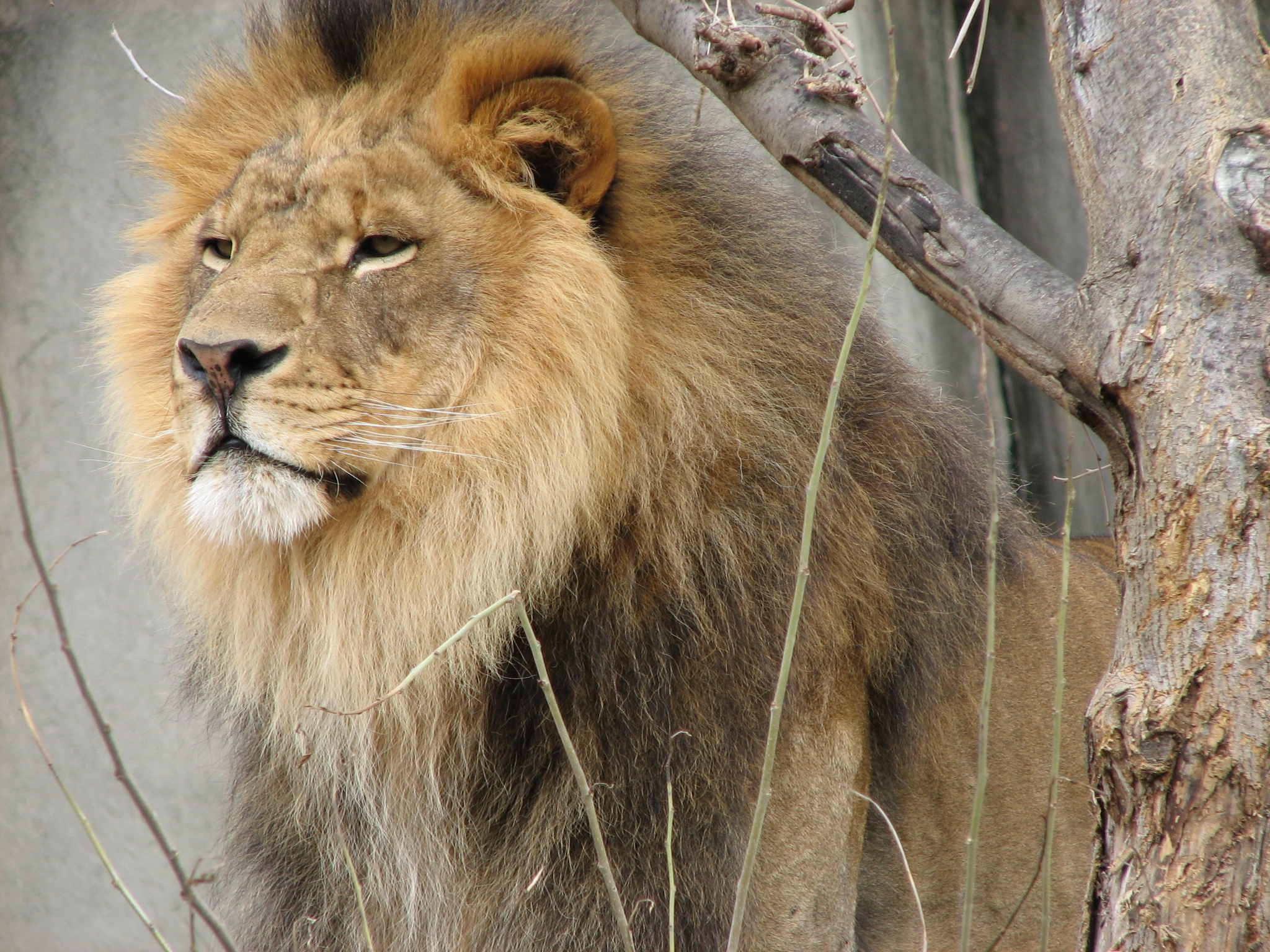
African lions were one of the most popular mammals on display.

The zoo specialized in four types of animals: mammals, birds, reptiles, and farm land animals. Some of the zoo's most popular mammals were African lions, white rhinoceros, white-throated Capuchin monkeys, Asian black bears and a polar bear named Winston. Birds on display at the zoo included golden eagle, lorikeets, scarlet macaws, and Indian peacocks. Reptiles at the zoo included: major skinks, bearded lizards, a selection of snakes (boa constrictor, papuan python, Madagascan Tree Boa etc.) and a tortoises including elongated, hermanns, African spurred, and Aldabran giant.

Glasgow Zoo also housed a large farmland display. Some of these animals include sheep, goats, geese, doves, large black pigs, ponies, and guinea pigs.

Glasgow Zoo also housed a dedicated aquatic enclosure playing host to a variety of rays, minor crustaceans and - controversially - a basking shark thought to have been captured off the coast of Stornoway. The shark perished within days.

Glasgow zoo was also well known as a zoological garden due to the large variety of plant life around the zoo's enclosures, and the zoo had a wildlife garden with a wide range of natural habitats including scrub woodland containing birch and ash trees, a large selection of hedge life including hawthorn and hazel and a section of traditional Scottish moorland. The wildlife garden and surrounding areas were often used for teaching as the wide variety of plants allowed for many areas of plant life to be studied.

== Controversies ==
During the zoo's final years before closure, it developed a large debt due to dwindling visitor numbers, lack of public funding, and the death of Richard O’Grady, the zoo's director, in 2001, which led to poor management decisions and negligence. The publication of this debt in the media, along with the apparent rundown appearance of the zoo, resulted in animal rights groups looking into the welfare of the zoo's animals. A report written by Jordi Casamitjana, for Advocates for Animals, made multiple claims of animal cruelty, including that unwanted pets were killed and fed to the zoo's snakes, and that the parents of the lion cubs at the park were brother and sister. The report also highlighted the financial status of the zoo and its substantial annual losses.

With such great debt it was inevitable that the zoo would fall into disrepair and the welfare of its animals would also fall dramatically. Les Ward, the director of Advocates for Animals, said that the zoo was the worst he had encountered, and that the group's report urged the licensing committee to close the zoo to the public immediately. Samantha Scott, an animal behaviourist at the Royal (Dick) School of Veterinary Studies, also commented in the report about the mental state of Glasgow zoo's animals: "The White rhino showing signs of possible stereotypic behaviour (circling), which is normally associated with difficulties in coping with captive life, or frustrated territorial patrolling." In defense of the allegations against the zoo, spokeswoman Alicia McGrewer stated "It is the humans who have not liked the aesthetics of Glasgow Zoo but animal welfare has never been compromised."

== Site development after closure ==
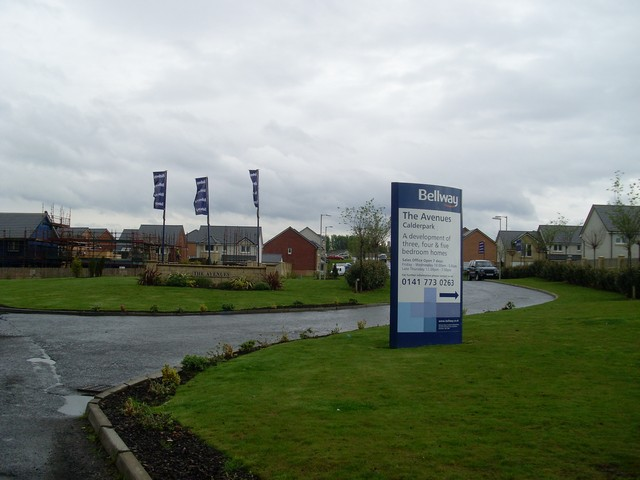
The housing project now placed on the Glasgow Zoo site.

By late 2004, one of the car parks built to facilitate Glasgow Zoo had been redeveloped into a set of luxury flats, the second car park being fenced off to reduce vandalism.

In March 2012, Miller Homes building company submitted an application detailing plans for the construction of 78 houses on the Glasgow zoo site to Glasgow city council. After receiving only one objection, these plans were approved subject to negotiations. The plans include the development of residential areas, infrastructure works including a park and ride facility for the new development and landscaping of the nearby areas.

== In literature ==
Glasgow Zoo (properly "a Glasgow zoo") is mentioned in the comic book The Black Island, one of The Adventures of Tintin series by the Belgian artist Hergé, where the gorilla Ranko says goodbye to his rescuer Tintin.

The Glasgow Zoo is referenced in the novel ‘Remarkably Bright Creatures’ by Shelby Van Pelt. It is mentioned as having an elephant enclosure, despite no elephants having ever been exhibited at the zoo.
