= Uddingston =

Town in South Lanarkshire, Scotland

Coordinates: 55.81829°N 4.08275°W

Uddingston: Scottish Gaelic: Baile Udain; Scots: Uddinstoun
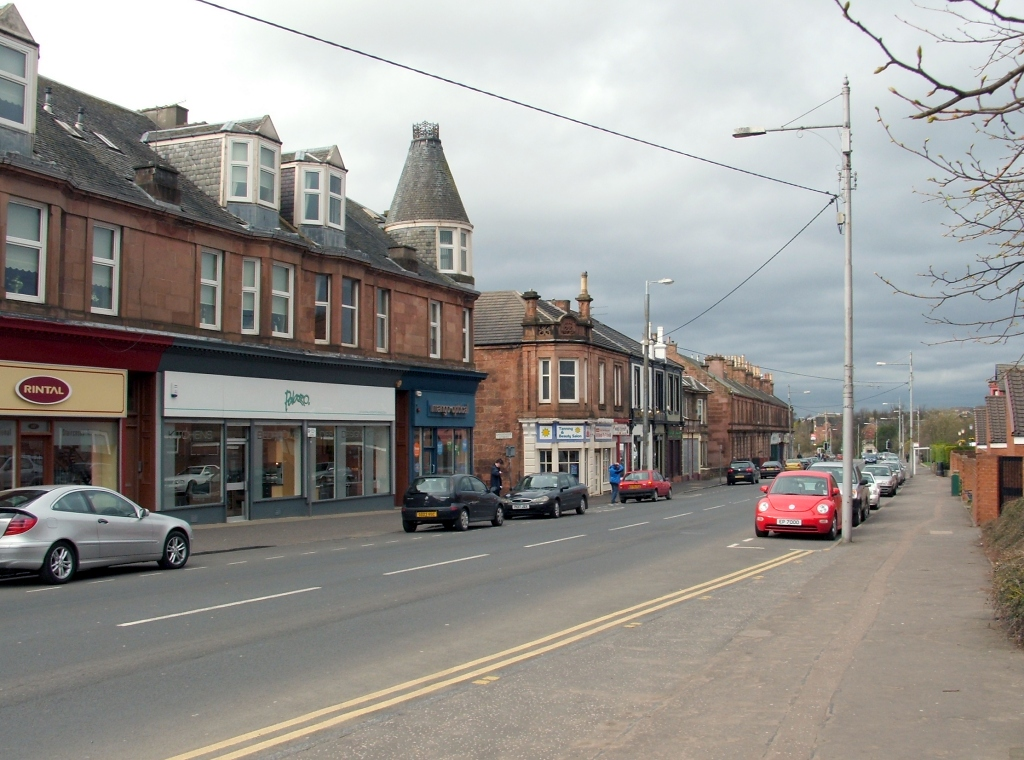
- Main Street (B7071) looking north

- Location within South Lanarkshire Uddingston (South Lanarkshire)
- Population: 6,300 (2020)
- OS grid reference: NS696603
- Council area: South Lanarkshire
- Lieutenancy area: Lanarkshire
- Country: Scotland
- Sovereign state: United Kingdom
- Post town: Glasgow
- Postcode district: G71
- Dialling code: 01698
- Police: Scotland
- Fire: Scottish
- Ambulance: Scottish
- UK Parliament: Rutherglen
- Scottish Parliament: Uddingston and Bellshill

Uddingston (Scots: Uddinstoun, Scottish Gaelic: Baile Udain) is a town in South Lanarkshire, Scotland. It is on the north side of the River Clyde, south-east of Glasgow city centre.

== Geography and boundaries ==
Uddingston is located 7 miles (11 km) to the south-east of Glasgow city centre and approximately 2 miles (3 km) east of the Glasgow City Council boundary (ending at the former Glasgow Zoo at Broomhouse - part of Baillieston). It is bounded to the south-west by the River Clyde as it flows north-west towards Glasgow, separating Uddingston, along with some woodland, from the neighbouring towns of Blantyre to the south and Cambuslang to the west. As such, the Clyde Walkway and National Cycle Route 75 both traverse the town. The nearest settlement to Uddingston is the large village of Bothwell, almost contiguous to the south-east; the two main streets are 2 miles (3 km) apart.

The village of Uddingston, which is contained exclusively within the boundaries of South Lanarkshire, houses around 6,400 residents. However, the nearby North Lanarkshire settlements of Tannochside, Calderbraes, Fallside, Viewpark, Birkenshaw and Spindlehowe form almost a continuous conurbation with Uddingston (although separated by the M74 motorway) and are often considered districts of Uddingston due to its greater historic significance. The population of this larger "Greater Uddingston" manifestation is approximately 23,000 residents, and shares a boundary with the nearby town of Bellshill (the town centres are 3 miles (5 km) apart). Within South Lanarkshire, the combined population of Uddingston and Bothwell (which is also a council ward) is around 13,000, and is located about 4 1/2 miles (7 km) north-west of Hamilton.

== Facilities ==
Uddingston is home to Tunnock's confectionery factory, famed for its caramel wafers and tea cakes. The factory (which also operates a small tea room on the Main Street) contributes much to the village's economy, as does the industrial estate and retail park located on Bellshill Road; this is named Bothwell Park but is located within Uddingston. In earlier times, coal mining was a major industry.

Uddingston has three supermarkets and traditional main street shops with a selection of restaurants and pubs. It also has several sports clubs including two municipal gyms, a multi-sports club featuring cricket (established in 1883, with the Bothwell Castle Cricket Ground having hosted List A cricket), hockey (established in 1975), rugby union (Uddingston RFC, established in 1906) and running, and a combined bowling and tennis club (formed 1863) within the centre of the village, plus Calderbraes Golf Club to the north-west, Bothwell Castle Golf Club immediately to the south and a Junior football club, Thorniewood United (based in Viewpark) in the vicinity.

Uddingston was also home to Glasgow Zoo from when it opened in 1947 until its closure in 2003; it was once a major attraction before folding due to lack of finances. The site now contains several private housing developments, effectively creating a new suburb known as Broomhouse which, despite sharing Uddingston's G71 postcode, lies within the boundaries of neighbouring Glasgow City Council and is geographically closer to the east end suburb of Baillieston than Uddingston.

=== Transport ===
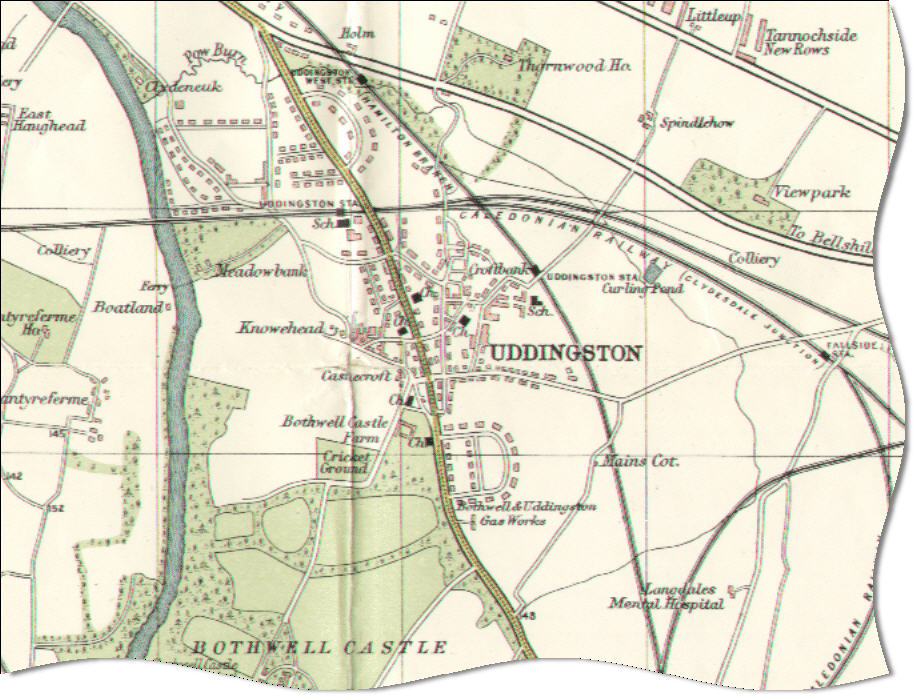
Map of Uddingston published in 1923

Uddingston railway station is served by ScotRail trains, typically running two hourly services on the Argyle Line and a third hourly service on the Shotts Line, all of which use the nearby Uddingston Viaduct, a Category A listed structure from the late 19th century. On the train running to Dalmuir or Milngavie via Glasgow, the next stop to the west is Cambuslang; Glasgow Central is six stops and approximately 16 minutes' journey time from Uddingston on the Argyle line, and one or two stops (dependent on the train) from Glasgow Central on the Edinburgh line train, a journey time of roughly twelve minutes. In the opposite direction towards Larkhall and Lanark on the Argyle line, the next stop to the south is Motherwell, while on the Edinburgh line, the next stop to the east is Bellshill.

Uddingston is served by three buses, two operated by First Glasgow and one by Coakley. Routes 255 and 240 run from Motherwell to Buchanan bus station in Glasgow. The 255 runs through Hamilton and Bothwell then through the east end of Glasgow via Parkhead to the city centre. The 240 runs via Bellshill and adjoins with the 255's route after Uddingston. The Coakley 107 service runs circularly through Uddingston, Hamilton, Wishaw, Motherwell and Bellshill.

The M74 motorway runs directly to the north and east of Uddingston, with junctions situated at either end of the town (J3A Daldowie giving access to the M73 and M8, and J5 Raith for the major A725 which also links to the M8). Its construction has led to a physical separation of the southern centre of Uddingston from the peripheral settlements to the north, with the motorway being used as the administrative border when the local authority areas of North Lanarkshire and South Lanarkshire were created in the 1990s.

=== Education ===
There are two local primary schools, the Roman Catholic St John the Baptist Primary on North British Road (which has a catchment area beyond the motorway into North Lanarkshire) and the non-denominational Muiredge Primary on Watson Street. Uddingston Grammar School, the non-denominational secondary school, is located on the Meadowbank floodplain off Old Glasgow Road; originally founded in 1884, the school relocated to a new campus adjacent to the old buildings in 2009 (a year behind schedule). In addition to Muiredge and Bothwell, Uddingston Grammar's catchment extends past both the M74 and the Clyde, being associated with feeder primary schools in Birkenshaw, Viewpark and Newton (Cambuslang). The closest Roman Catholic secondary schools are Holy Cross High School, Hamilton and Cardinal Newman High School, Bellshill.

== Notable residents ==
The wider Uddingston area has been home to a few successful footballers: Jimmy Johnstone, George McCluskey and John Higgins of Celtic; Tommy McQueen (Aberdeen, West Ham, Clyde, Falkirk); Iain Munro (player, coach and manager, Hibernian, St Mirren, Sunderland); Gary MacKenzie (Dundee, Blackpool); Lindsay Hamilton (Stenhousemuir, Rangers, St Johnstone, Dunfermline); and John Robertson who most notably played at Nottingham Forest, winning the European Cup.

Barry Burns, the pianist/guitarist of the Scottish instrumental group Mogwai, comes from Uddingston.

Uddingston was the birthplace of James W. Black (14 June 1924 – 22 March 2010), the Scottish doctor and pharmacologist who was awarded the Nobel Prize in Physiology or Medicine in 1988 for work leading to the discovery of Propranolol and Cimetidine.

Thomas Tunnock (born in Uddingston in 1865) was the founder of what would become one of Scotland's most recognisable confectionery brands, Thomas Tunnock Ltd, established in the town in December 1890. After completing an apprenticeship at the Aberdour Bakery, he purchased a small baker's shop in Uddingston for £80 and began producing fresh rolls, cakes, and pies for the local community.
