= Noddy housing =

Low quality commercial housing

Noddy housing (sometimes called "Noddy Box Housing" or "Shoddy Noddy Boxes") is commercially built housing of low build quality or design merit. This term is most commonly used in the United Kingdom and surrounding areas.

Noddy houses are typically small homes on narrow plots of land built since the early 1990s by large property development companies. They are normally considered to be far less spacious than homes built in preceding decades of the 20th century, and are perceived as being poorly executed architecturally and aesthetically.

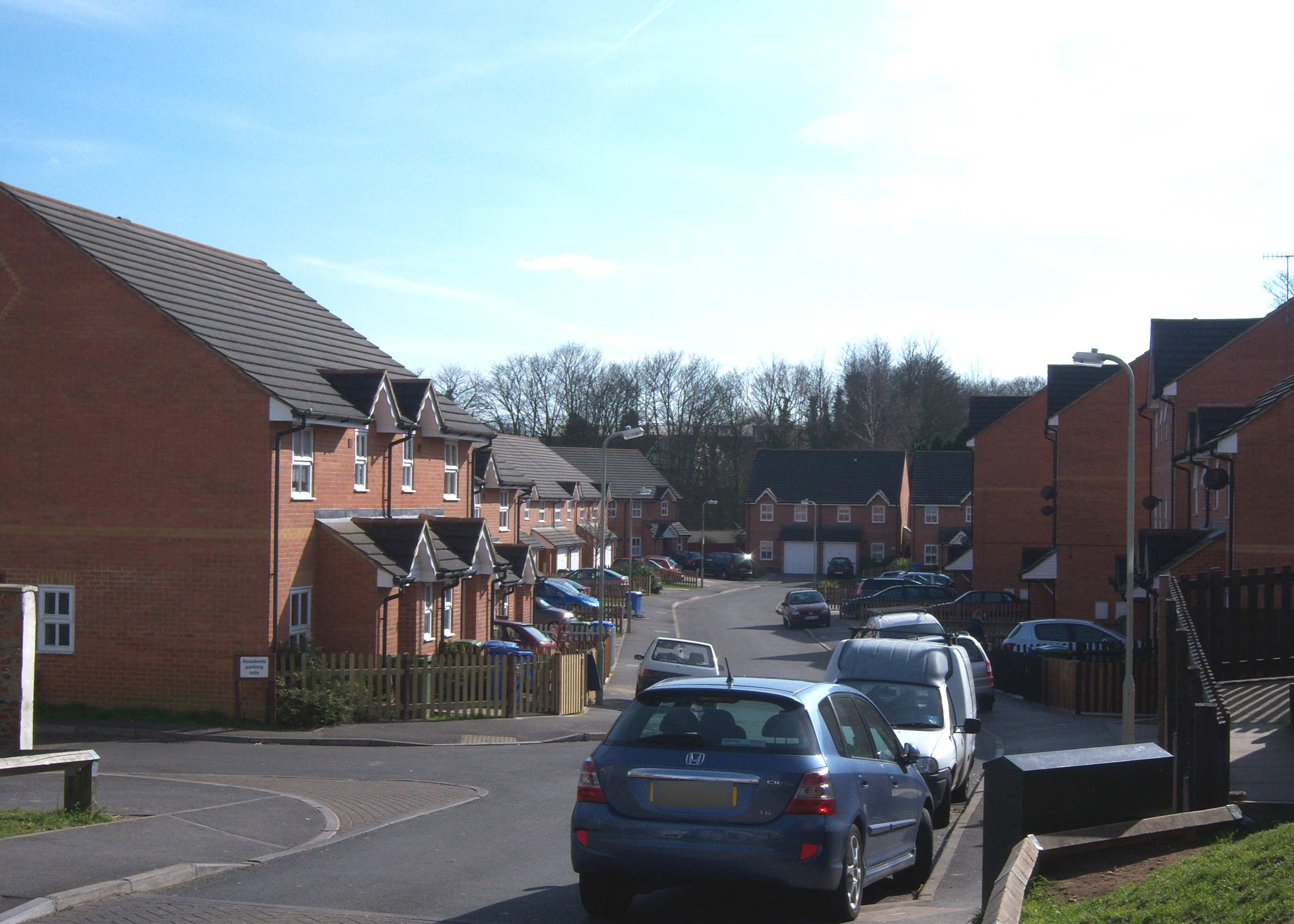
Cul-de-Sac of relatively plain 'Noddy Houses' in Aldershot, Hampshire. Note roof construction being of 45° standard trusses (yet allowing internal volume to be wasted by not being in use as habitable space) with apparently unnecessary smaller gables.

A counterpoint to this argument is that they are not so much poorly executed houses, but simply cheaper houses with the merit of being more affordable. If they were more spacious and built of better materials on larger plots of land, self-evidently they would cost more.

== Design and appearance ==
Noddy houses usually appear to tip towards traditional ideals of British housebuilding through use of brick and masonry detail, gabled and hipped roof forms, and window and door styles derived from older methods of construction. Because of the commerciality of volume housebuilding and the desire for companies to cut costs in construction, these elements suffer – with bricks being less attractive and mass-produced kinds, and windows and doors being standardised models of non-traditional uPVC and fibreglass with only suggestions of traditional detail by way of fake 'integral' glazing bars or sometimes imitation lead came.

== See also ==
- Tract housing
