= Glasgow, Bothwell, Hamilton and Coatbridge Railway =

UK railway company

Overview
- Locale: Scotland
- Dates of operation: 1877–1878
- Successor: North British Railway

Technical
- Track gauge: 1,435 mm (4 ft 8 1/2 in)

The Glasgow, Bothwell, Hamilton and Coatbridge Railway was a railway company in Scotland, built to serve coal and ironstone pits in the Hamilton and Bothwell areas, and convey the mineral to Glasgow and to ironworks in the Coatbridge area. It was allied to the North British Railway, and it opened in 1877. Passenger services followed.

As a late competitor to the dominant Caledonian Railway, it was always secondary in the area, and the passenger service ceased by 1955. The mineral traffic declined sharply and the last goods train ran in 1961.

== History ==
=== The coal railways and the Monklands ===
The Monklands district near Airdrie was the source of plentiful coal, which was in demand for residential and industrial purposes in Glasgow and elsewhere, and in 1826 the Monkland and Kirkintilloch Railway was opened to convey the mineral to the Forth and Clyde Canal for onward transport. Discovery of the excellent blackband ironstone in the area, and the development of the hot blast system of smelting iron ore, led to a massive growth of iron industries and mineral extraction in the Coatbridge and Airdrie region. The Monkland and Kirkintilloch Railway found itself perfectly located to serve the new industries.

In 1831 the Garnkirk and Glasgow Railway opened, running directly to Glasgow, and as the iron industries grew, other "coal railways" opened. Their technology was primitive and horse traction was dominant in the early years. The Caledonian Railway obtained an authorising act of Parliament, the Caledonian Railway Act 1845 (8 & 9 Vict. c. clxii), to build a main line from Glasgow and Edinburgh to Carlisle. To gain access to Glasgow the Caledonian arranged to take over the Garnkirk and Glasgow line and an associated railway, the Wishaw and Coltness Railway, and the main line was planned to follow the route of those railways. The Caledonian Railway opened in 1848 and gained control of the railways connecting the iron industry to Glasgow; at the time onward conveyance by sea from quays in Glasgow was significant, and the Monkland and Kirkintilloch Railway too retained its share of the traffic, although its routes were not well suited for connecting to Glasgow and the west coast.

=== Hamilton and Bothwell ===
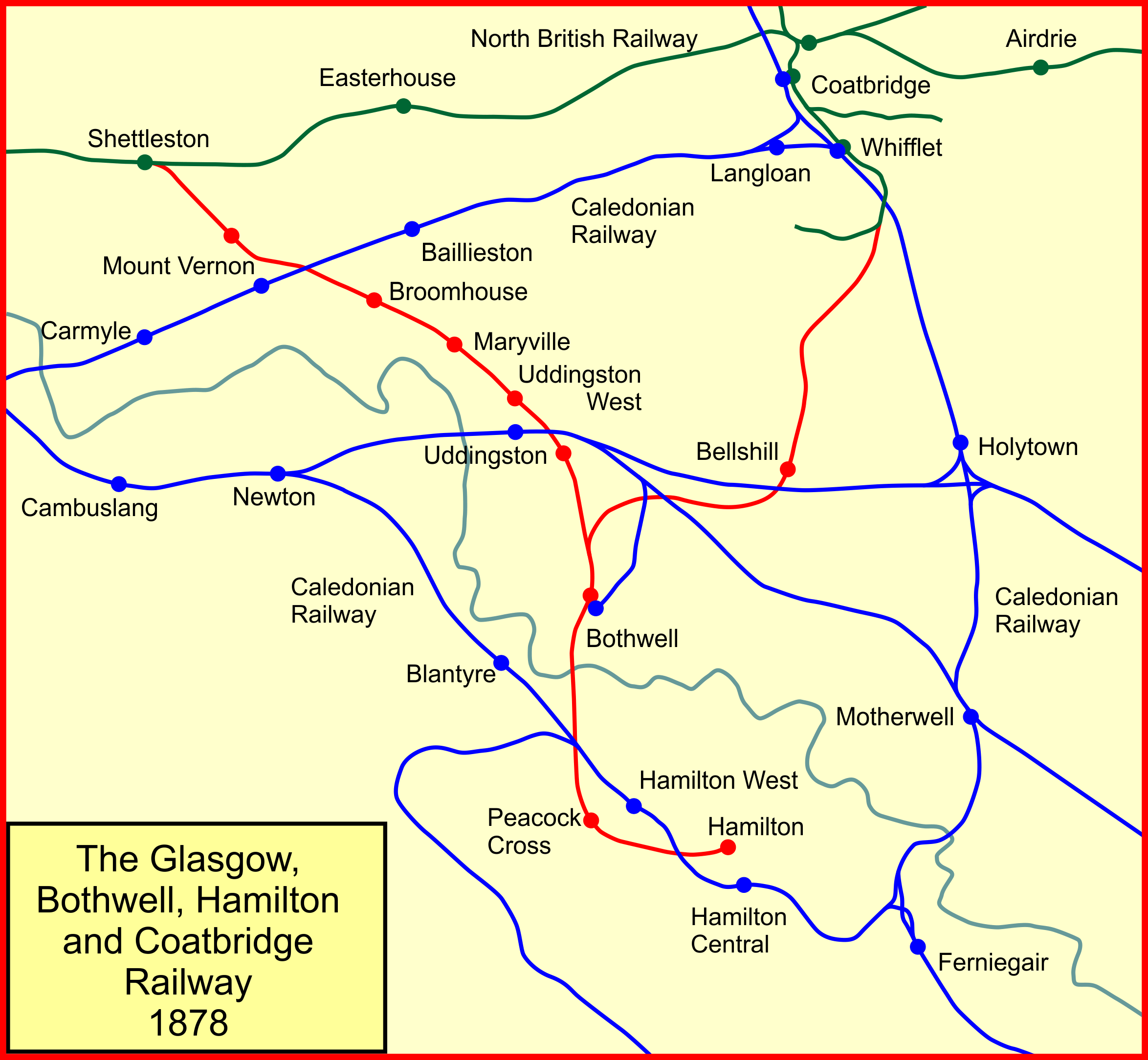
The Glasgow, Bothwell, Hamilton and Coatbridge Railway system

The boom in coal and iron in the Monklands was massive, but as years passed, the best seams began to be worked out, and discoveries were made further south; the general area around Hamilton was found to be especially fruitful, and once again the Caledonian Railway found itself well placed to handle the traffic: it already had a line to Hamilton, and branches from that line and from Motherwell gave access to many pits; the smelting and other finishing activities still took place in the Monklands, so that much mineral traffic went to that area from the pits around Hamilton.

The Caledonian Railway had a monopoly of this lucrative traffic, but further pits were opening, and the Caledonian had priorities elsewhere. At the same time the pit owners resented the monopoly of the Caledonian over the pits that were connected.

=== A new railway proposed ===
Glasgow, Bothwell, Hamilton, and Coatbridge Railway Act 1874
- Act of Parliament
- Parliament of the United Kingdom
- Long title: An Act for making Railways to Bothwell and Hamilton, and other places in the county of Lanark; and for other purposes.
- Citation: 37 & 38 Vict. c. cxlviii

Dates
- Royal assent: 16 July 1874

Text of statute as originally enacted

The North British Railway responded to the situation by trying to obtain parliamentary authorisation, but this was refused in both the 1872 and 1873 parliamentary sessions. In the following year the industrialists promoted a line themselves, and the Glasgow, Bothwell, Hamilton and Coatbridge Railway was incorporated on 16 July 1874 by the Glasgow, Bothwell, Hamilton, and Coatbridge Railway Act 1874 (37 & 38 Vict. c. cxlviii). It was to build a 12-mile (19 km) line from Shettleston on the North British Railway's Coatbridge line, to Hamilton, and a 3-mile (5 km) branch from Whifflet (actually from the Rosehall branch near Whifflet) to Bothwell Junction on the Hamilton line. The authorised capital was £500,000.

The Whifflet section of the line enabled the carriage of iron ore and coal to the ironworks at Coatbridge; the main line to Shettleston led to Glasgow.

=== Opening ===
The line opened between Shettleston and Hamilton on 1 November 1877 for goods traffic and passengers on 1 April 1878. There was a spectacular viaduct at Craighead over the River Clyde south of Bothwell, with lattice girders; there were eight spans of 728 feet (222 m) span.

The branch line to Whifflet opened on 1 November 1878 for goods and 1 May 1879 for passengers.

The company worked the line itself with four 0-6-0 tank locomotives, but the traffic offering overwhelmed its capacity to work it, and in the middle of 1878 the company called in the North British Railway to assist.

=== Absorbed by the NBR, and after ===
In fact the company was absorbed by the North British Railway on 2 August 1878, by the North British Railway Act 1878 (41 & 42 Vict. c. cxl) of 21 July 1878. The original shareholders received a generous settlement of 5% on the half million of capital, rising to 8% from 1886.

The North British intended to use the line to launch further into south Lanarkshire, but in the end a territorial exclusivity arrangement was made with the Caledonian, and the plan was dropped.

During World War I the line from Bothwell to Hamilton was closed to passengers except for workmen's trains, from 1 January 1917 to 2 June 1919.

In the 1940s local passenger services to Whifflet and Coatbridge were operated by Sentinel railcars; this arrangement ceased in 1948.

In 1947 Glasgow Zoo was established in the Calderpark area, and became very popular. As the Hamilton line ran nearby, a station, Calderpark Halt, was opened to serve it in 1951.

=== Closure ===
The output of the pits in the area declined substantially in the 1930s and after World War II it began to be obvious that the line was underutilised; much of the remaining coal output was also served by the former Caledonian Railway routes, and as the railways were under common ownership, having been nationalised in 1948, there was no value in sustaining competing lines.

In 1952 it was determined that the Clyde Viaduct south of Bothwell was in need of substantial expenditure to restore it to a safe condition, and the decision was taken to close that section of the line: on 15 September 1952 the section south of Bothwell was closed completely. The passenger service on the line from Bothwell to Whifflet had already been closed in September 1951, and the Shettleston to Bothwell section closed to passenger traffic in 1955.

The last passenger train from Bothwell was hauled by a Gresley V1 class locomotive, no 67622.

Goods and mineral traffic on the Bothwell to Whifflet section ceased in 1955, and in 1961 the entire line south of Mount Vernon closed in 1961. The short section from Shettleston to Mount Vernon, where this was still an active colliery, continued in use until it too closed in 1965.

== The present day ==
This line is closed. For some time a short siding at Shettleston was the only piece of track on the alignment of the GBH&CR but it has now been removed. Several earthworks and bridges, and the piers of Craighead Viaduct remain.

== Topography ==
=== Shettleston to Hamilton ===
- Shettleston Junction; divergence from NBR Glasgow to Coatbridge line;
- Mount Vernon; opened 1 April 1878; closed 1 January 1917; reopened 2 June 1919; renamed Mount Vernon North 1952; closed 4 July 1955;
- Broomhouse; opened 1 November 1878; closed 1 January 1917; reopened 2 June 1919; closed 24 September 1927;
- Calderpark Halt; opened 5 July 1951; closed 4 July 1955;
- Maryville; opened 1 April 1878; closed 1 February 1908;
- Uddingston West; opened 1 June 1888; closed 1 January 1917; reopened 2 June 1919; closed 4 July 1955;
- Uddingston; opened 1 April 1878; closed 1 January 1917; reopened 2 June 1919; renamed Uddingston East 1953; closed 4 July 1955;
- Bothwell Junction; convergence of line from Whifflet;
- Bothwell; opened 1 April 1878; closed 1 January 1917 except for workmen's trains; reopened 2 June 1919; closed 4 July 1955;
- Blantyre Junction; junction of Blantyre line (to Priestfield Colliery);
- Greenfield; opened April 1878; renamed Burnbank 1902; closed 1 January 1917 except for workmen's trains; reopened 2 June 1919; closed 15 September 1952;
- Hamilton Peacock Cross; opened December 1878; renamed Peacock Cross 1882; closed 1 January 1917;
- Hamilton; opened 1 April 1878; closed 1 January 1917 except for workmen's trains; reopened 2 June 1919; closed 15 September 1952; sometimes referred to as Hamilton Cadzow Street or Hamilton Terminus.

=== Whifflet to Bothwell Junction ===
- Rosehall South Junction; divergence from Rosehall Colliery branch;
- Bellshill; opened 1 May 1879; closed 1 January 1917 except for workmen's trains; reopened 2 June 1919; closed 10 September 1951;
- Bothwell Park; workmen's station for adjacent colliery; dates unknown;
- junction; convergence of mineral line from Hamilton Palace Colliery;
- Bothwell Junction; see above.

== Gallery ==
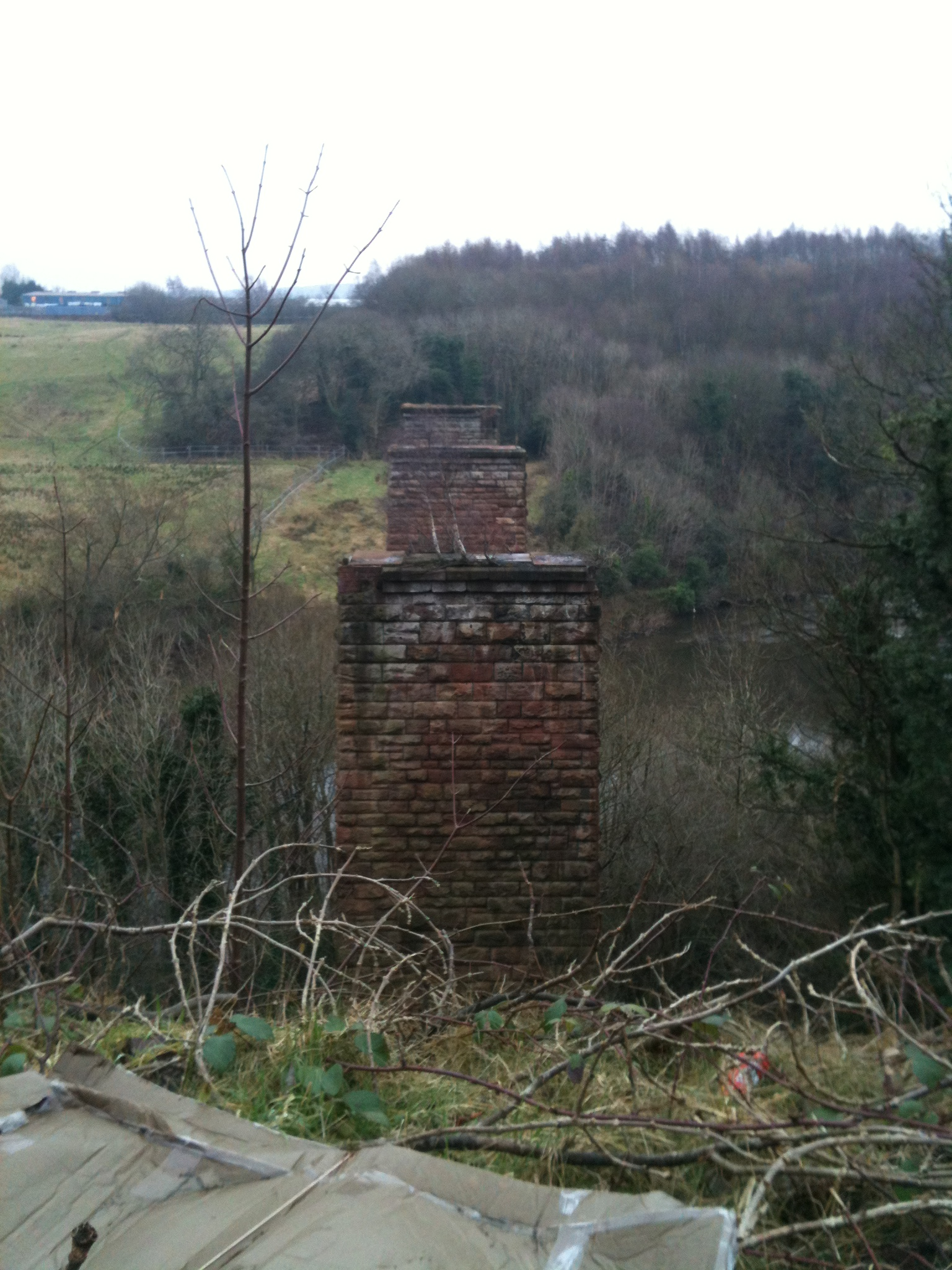
The remains of Craighead Viaduct between Bothwell and Blantyre.

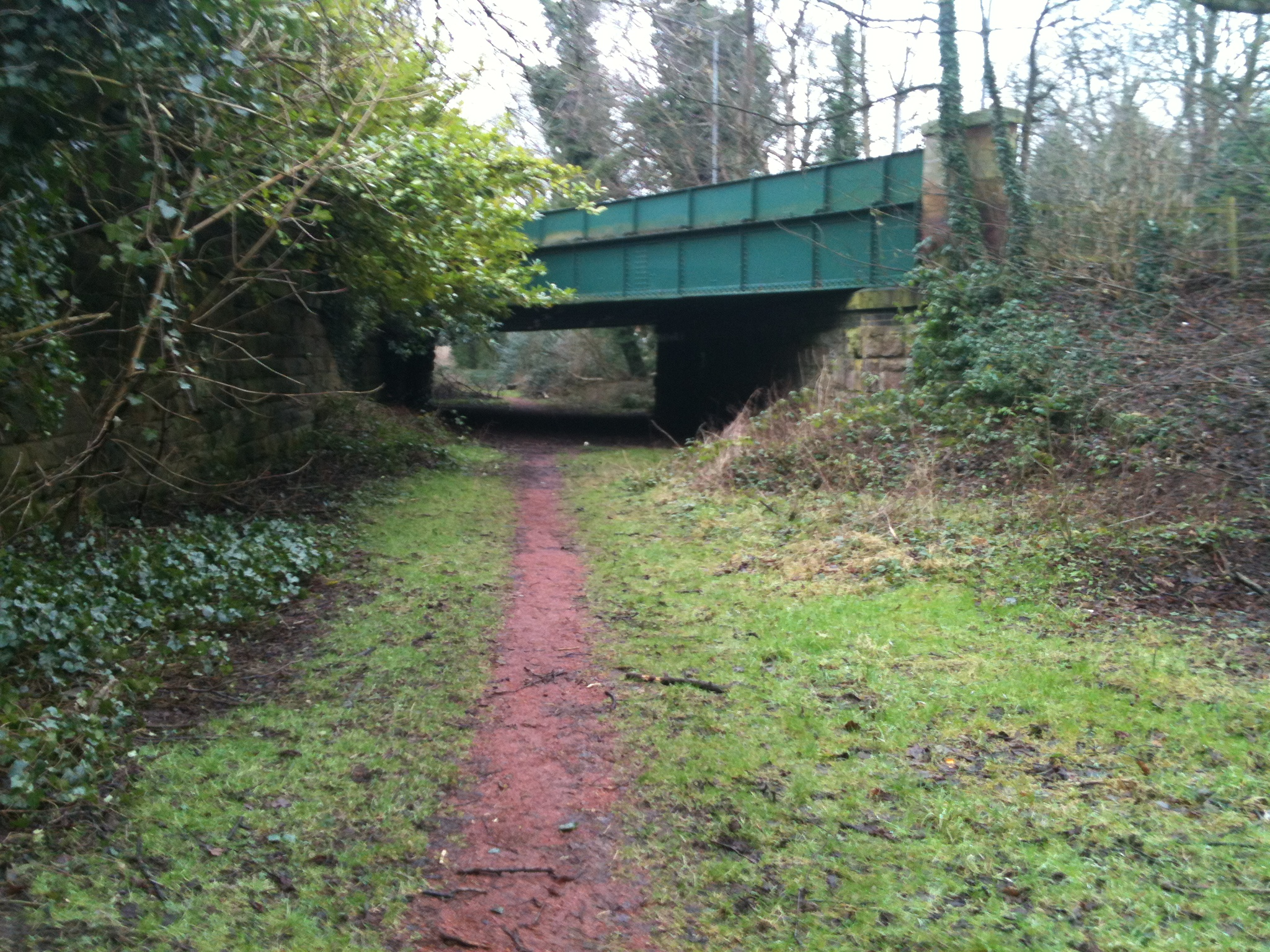
Approaching Craighead Viaduct from Bothwell nearly 70 years after closure.

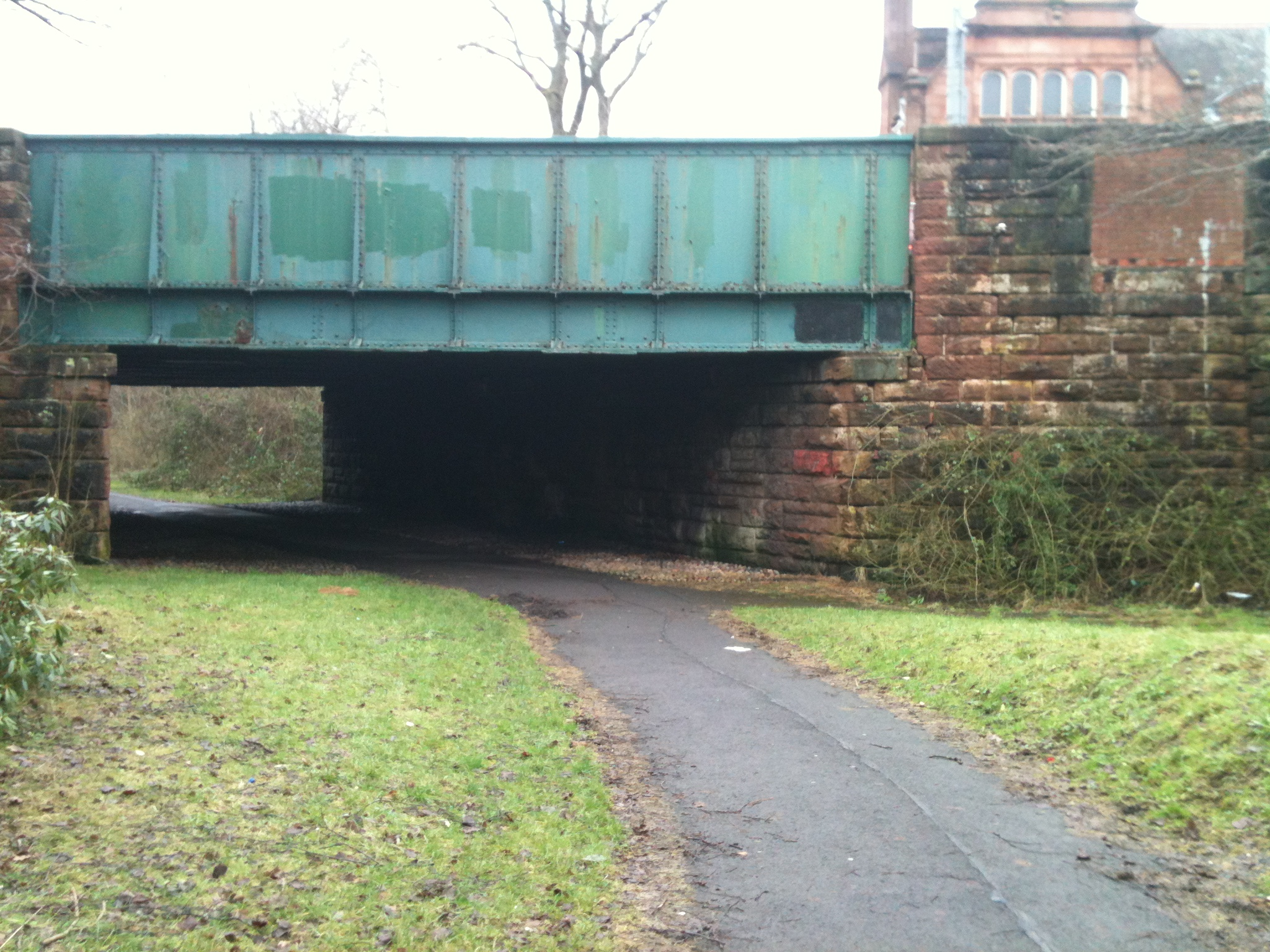
Bothwell Station site.
