= History of Cambuslang =

The History of Cambuslang is explained to a great deal by its geography. Now in South Lanarkshire, the town of Cambuslang is an ancient part of Scotland where Iron Age remains (at Dechmont Hill) loom over 21st century housing developments. It has been very prosperous over time, depending first upon its agricultural land, (supplying food, then wool, then linen) then the mineral resources under its soil (limestone and coal, and, to some extent, iron).

== History ==
=== Etymology ===
Reverend Doctor James Meek, minister in Cambuslang from 1772 until 1810 and Moderator of the General Assembly of the Church of Scotland in 1795, wrote in the First Statistical Account of Scotland (1792):

"Cameos, now changed into Camus or Cambus in the Gaelic language, signifies a crooked torrent or rivulet; and LAN or Launse, now changed into Lang, was the name of a saint famous as the founder of many monasteries".

His follower and son-in-law, Rev Dr John Robertson, assistant to, then Minister of Cambuslang from 1797 until 1843, suggested in the Second Statistical Account of Scotland (1845):

"Cam, in the British and Celtic, transformed by the Scoto-Saxons (sic) into cambus, signifies bending or bowed- usg or uisg means water- and glan, which in composition becomes LAN – denotes a bank or bank of water. Thus Cambuslang appears to signify the water with the bending bank. But whether the camb or cambus is to be sought for in the bending banks of the rivulet which passes the church or in the magnificent sweep of the Clyde, as it winds round the northern end of the parish, it is impossible to say."

However, Iain Mac an Tàilleir writes in his collection of placenames in Scotland (2003):

Cambuslang (Lanark). "River bend of ships", from Camas Long. This was the furthest point up the Clyde navigable by large vessels.

=== Origins ===
The Parish of Cambuslang in the Barony of Drumsargard – whose castle ruins can be discerned to the south-east of Hallside – can be traced back to the time of King Alexander II of Scotland (1214–49) when it belonged to Walter Olifard, Justiciar of Lothian. The Barony of Drumsargard passed to Archibald Douglas, 3rd Earl of Douglas in 1370, as part of the settlement in his marriage to Johanna, daughter of Thomas Moray of Bothwell. In 1452 the Douglases were displaced in favour of James Lord Hamilton, who became tenant-in-chief in 1455. This feudal superiority remained with the Dukes of Hamilton – who were also the largest landowners – up until 1922, though the abolition of feudalism in Scotland did not come until the end of the 20th century.

=== The church and Saint Cadoc ===
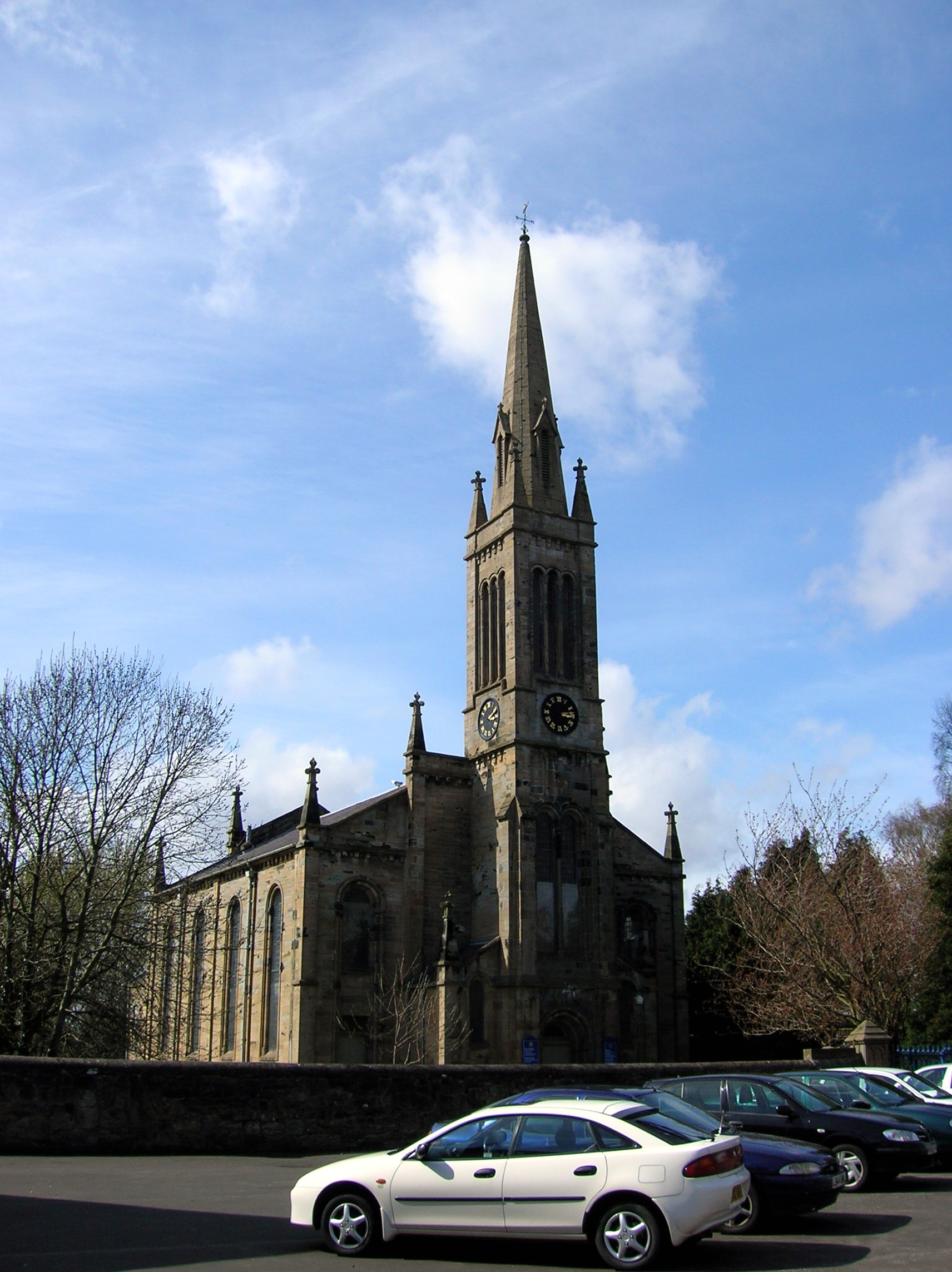
Cambuslang Old Parish Church (1841)

The origin of the Parish Kirk of Cambuslang is lost to history, though by struct tradition it was founded by Saint Cadoc in the 6th century. Certainly, St Cadoc (or Cadow in some sources) is recorded in Medieval texts to have founded a monastery at or near the mountain of Bannawc where a king called Caw had his stronghold or Caer, and that this was in the district of Lintheamus. Antiquarians such as Skene suggested that Lintheamus was from Linthcamus, and that this equated to Cambuslang, while the seat at the mountain of Bannawc was the Caerbannawc, hence Carmunnock. This suggestion was focused on by Cambuslang antiquarians with gusto from the late 1800s onwards, especially as it found repetition in less detailed sources which clouded the particulars and uncertainty of the matter, such as The Lives of Irish Saints, or otherwise authoritative authors such as Joseph Bain in their contributions to the proceedings of the Society of Antiquaries of Scotland. However, this association with Cambuslang is not accepted by modern scholarship, including place-name studies, which find no relationship with Cambuslang or Carmunnock in the vitae, and that Skene's efforts are simply a case of fallacious soundalike etymology. These authors instead identify the locus in the vitae with other places in Scotland. It is clear that a Cambuslang connection to this saint occurred far earlier and that the earlier association long predates antiquarian supposition and possibly may not be derived from reading into the saint's vitae. For example, the old testamentary records of the parish note dying wishes of residents in the 1550s - to be buried 'in the dust' (soil) of St Cadoc. There is no recent dedicated study determining any authentic connection between Cambuslang and Cadoc, or what the provenance of the older Cadoc association is. Consequently, the connection with Cambuslang and the missionary work of St Cadoc or his followers may be viewed at this time as tenuous until further evidence surfaces. Although popular recent sources, such as that disseminated by St Cadoc's Parish Church, assert that Saint Cadoc founded a monastery in Cambuslang, these traditions have their source as reworkings by that church or otherwise of popular literature available online or in printed examples (the two platforms interdependent for source material), such as A Welsh Classical Dictionary which actually contain no references to Cambuslang; thus, such modern associations are themselves spurious.

With potentially historical connections to Saint Cadoc in the sixth century acknowledged, the first truly historical reference to an ecclesiastic in Cambuslang dates to about 1180 AD in relation to the Barony of Drumasargard. Subsequently, there is a fairly full record of at least the names of Cambuslang clergy.

John Cameron of Lochiel was Rector of Cambuslang before he became Bishop of Glasgow. In 1429, as Bishop, he made Cambuslang a prebend of Glasgow Cathedral – meaning that the Rector (or Prebendary) could siphon off its teinds (that is tithes) to pay for one of his officials. The prebendary and his successor were to be perpetual Chancellors of the Cathedral. A later Archbishop of Glasgow James Beaton (or Bethune) was uncle to David Beaton, the Cardinal murdered at the Reformation. James made David Rector (and so prebendary) of Cambuslang in about 1520.

The prebendaries had a very fine view of the Cathedral from Cambuslang, but the distance meant they had to reside at Glasgow. Instead, they appointed vicars to care for the souls of the Parish. The vicars were allocated a house and 6 acres (24,000 m²), in an area near the Kirk, which is still called Vicarland. This indicates that the area was (relatively) prosperous. A post-Reformation church was erected in 1626 and a village (Kirkhill) grew up around it. A new kirk was built in the middle of the 18th century and this was replaced by the current building during the 19th century.

=== Our Lady of Cambuslang ===
Another source of prosperity might have been derived from pilgrims to Our Lady of Cambuslang. Pilgrims had long come to Cambuslang to venerate the "ashes of St Cadoc" so it was not surprising that a chapel was founded in 1379 by William Monypenny, Rector of Cambuslang, and this had been ratified by a Charter of King Robert II (dated 8 August 1379). The chapel was on the edge of the ravine near Sauchiebog and was dedicated to the Virgin Mary. No trace of the chapel remains. Even its location is in doubt, but local Catholics like to think their current church of Saint Bride’s is built on the spot. 19th century maps suggest it was situated where the Kirkburn gorge crossed the Caledonian Railway. Moreover, there are vestiges of an ancient hospital at Spittal (still called so to this day) some 2.5 miles (4.0 km) southeast of the Kirk. This again is suggestive of pilgrimages, in search of cures, which is confirmed by the fact that the Chapel was recorded as a valuable commodity at the time of the Reformation.

=== Prosperity ===
The soil in Cambuslang was a light loam, suitable for cultivation, but its mineral reserves are what brought modern prosperity. There was a limestone so fine as to be called "Cambuslang marble". This is capable of a very high polish. A good example can be seen in an 18th-century fireplace in the Duke of Hamilton’s old hunting lodge at Chatelherault Country Park near Hamilton. (James Hamilton, 2nd Earl of Arran, was granted the title of Duc de Châtellerault in 1548 for his part in arranging the marriage of Mary, Queen of Scots, to Francis, Dauphin of France). However, coal was mined from the 16th century and ironstone from the 18th, and it was these that brought industrial wealth.

Clyde Iron Works started as an offshoot of the Carron iron works in 1786 and by the early 20th century was the largest ironworks in Scotland. It was here, in 1828, that the hot blast was invented by James Beaumont Neilson. Clydebridge Steelworks started in 1887. It was linked with Clyde Iron Works just prior to WWII when it became the largest integrated steelworks in the country, producing steel plates for most of the famous ships on the Clyde. Clyde Iron Works finally closed in 1978. Steelmaking at Clydebridge stopped in 1978, the plate mill closed in 1982, but the heat treatment section of the works is still in operation.

The extensive ironworks also attracted engineering and manufacturing during the 19th and 20th centuries – the most prominent being Mitchell Engineering and Hoover (since shut down). A shale oil business was present in the mid 19th century. There is also reference to a trade in violet quartz and turkey-red dyeing, associated with the textile industries of nearby Dalmarnock. The standard sandstone of the area was used in building – most of the elegant 19th century villas which cover much of today’s Cambuslang were built of sandstone, quarried on the spot, or from several quarries, including two at Wellshot and Eastfield. Nowadays, Cambuslang takes advantage of its proximity to the motorway system and has developed several industrial estates and distribution centres.

The Reverend Doctor James Meek wrote the entry for the First Statistical Account of Scotland (published 1791 to 1799). He writes clearly, elegantly, and enthusiastically. He was a true Enlightenment cleric. On the one hand he records personally-gathered and extensive data on weather, population, farming, industry, history, transport and local personalities. He gets quite carried away with enthusiasm in describing the great improvements brought to Cambuslang in the late 18th century as a result of applying reason and science to practical problems. The opening of the turnpike road to Glasgow was a particular joy. This allowed locals access to a burgeoning market (and allowed them to bring in cartloads of city manure in return). But he lays out a parallel table showing the vast improvements between 1750 and 1790.

=== The Cambuslang Wark ===
On the other hand, Meek is rather distrustful of any suggestion of 'enthusiasm' in religion. He realises he is on contentious territory so he affects to tell the whole story of the "Cambuslang Wark" (Cambuslang Work) of 1742 with due dispassion. At the top of the gorge, near the kirk, is a ‘natural amphitheatre on the green side of the ravine’ where the Methodist preacher George Whitefield came to preach in the open. This was part of the Great Awakening, or Revival, affecting the whole of the UK and stretching to the colonies in North America.

As Dr Meek's successor (and son-in-law) Dr Robertson describes it in the Second Statistical Account. It occurred from 15 February until 15 August 1742 under the ministry of the Rev Mr Mcculloch ‘when in an encampment of tents on the hillside, Whitefield, at the head of a band of clergy, held day after day a festival, which might be called awful, but scarcely solemn, among a multitude calculated by contemporary writers, to amount to 30,000 people.’ Dr Robertson had inherited his father-in-law’s suspicion of 'enthusiasm'. A centenary event was held on 14 August 1842 attracting from 10,000 to 20,000 participants.

=== A railway suburb ===
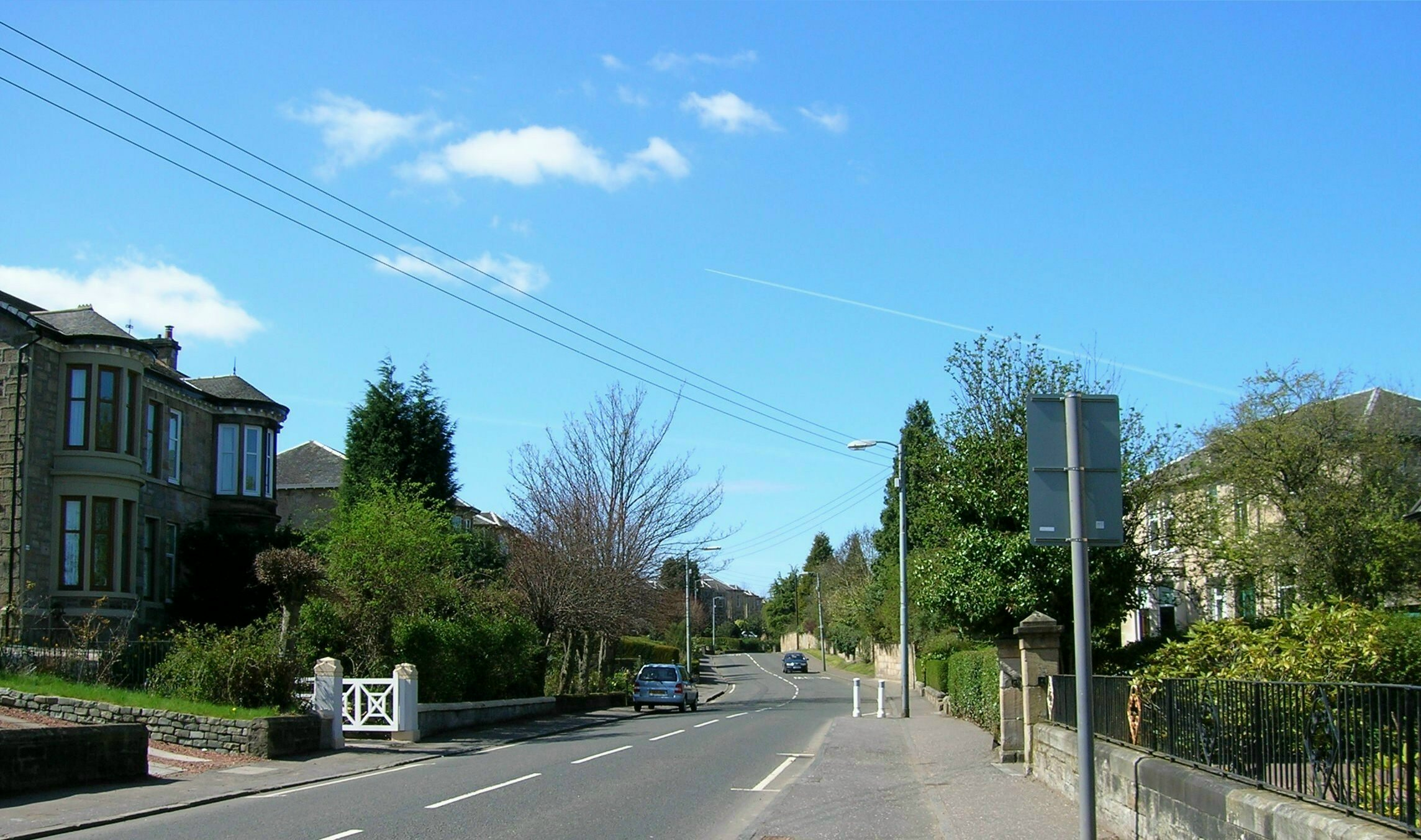
19th-century houses in Brownside Road

By the end of the 19th century, many wealthy Glasgow businessmen had built houses in Cambuslang due to its easy accessibility by rail from the city. Many of the heritors had sold off their estates for building. In the late 1860s, Thomas Gray Buchanan sold off the 'lands of Wellshot' on which elegant sandstone and slate roofed villas were built. His own mansion house still exists – a very modest early 19th-century country house, situated in Milton Avenue off Buchanan Drive – though it is now divided into flats. The original wall to its orchard and garden can be seen on Brownside Road – the limestone blocks are roughly hewn as opposed to more 'modern' villas whose machine-cut stones are very regular.

=== Population ===
Dr Robertson also carried on Dr Meek’s other "enlightened" enthusiasms – for collecting detail of the progress of science and industry in Cambuslang, as indicated by a growing population which he tabulates thus:

Year	Population
1755	934
1775	1096
1785	1088
1791	1288
1796	1558
1801	1616
1807	1870
1811	2035
1815	2045
1821	2301
1831	2697
1835	2705

Census data (given in the Gazetteer of Scotland in 1901) shows that the population had grown in 1881 to 5538. By 1891 it was 8323.

Dr Robertson says that most of the population lived in 'villages' (really very small hamlets) while the rest lived in 'rural areas'. None of the villages bore the name of Cambuslang (this was the parish). Their names are retained in district names to this day but Dr Robertson recorded the thirteen villages as Dalton, Lightburn, Deans, Howieshill, Vicarland, Kirkhill, Sauchiebog, Chapelton, Bushyhill, Culluchburn, Silverbank, East Coats, and West Coats.

=== Heritors ===
Robertson also gave details of the 'heritors' (the landowners who appointed the minister and schoolteacher and set the rates to pay for them and the poor rate). The most important heritor was still (in 1845) the Duke of Hamilton but all the estates, big and small, were listed, with their area.

Estate	Area	
	(acre)	(m²)
Cambuslang	3507	14 190 000
Westburn	800	3 240 000
Newton	361	1 460 000
Spittal	203	822 000
Moriston	50	202 000
Rosebank	50	202 000
Daviesholm	50	202 000
Hallside	50	202 000
Crookedshields	50	202 000
Caldergrove	20	81 000
Chapel	5	20 000
Letterick	4	16 000
Do.	3	12 000

Not all these heritors lived in the Parish (for example the Parish Records indicate that the Duke was always represented by a minion), but Dr Robertson opines, "The number of families of independent fortune residing occasionally or permanently in the parish is about 5. There are about 7 fatuous persons and 2 blind." (Not among the heritors, one presumes.)

== Buildings ==
The buildings of Cambuslang include ancient sites, medieval castle ruins, 18th-century mansion remnants, churches, schools, public buildings, commercial and industrial premises and retail and leisure facilities. There are three, much modified, railway stations. The very diverse domestic architecture comprises 19th-century mansions, villas and tenements, and sheltered and nursing homes constructed from Victorian public buildings. Extensive 20th- and 21st-century housing estates include private and social housing and range from small terraces to high rise flats. The 1960s town centre has recently been redeveloped.

=== Ruins and remains ===
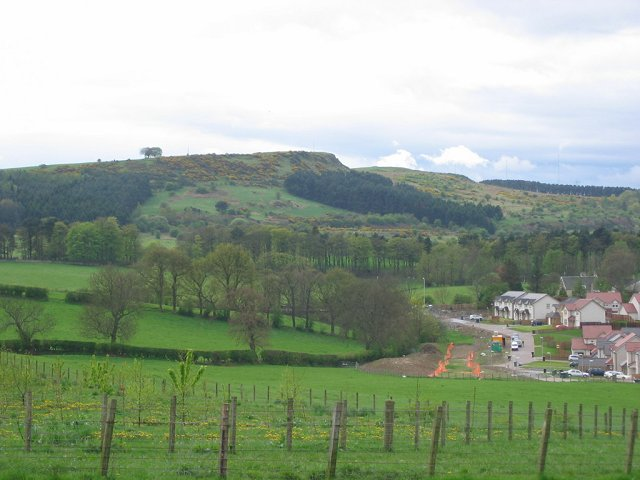
View north from Hallside towards Dechmont Hill

The original Wellshot House, c.1865

- Remains of an Iron Age fort can be seen on top of Dechmont Hill
- Drumsagard Castle near Hallside (now within the Drumsagard Village development). A circular mound is all that remains, though the stones were used c1775 to build Hallside Farm.
- Gilbertfield Castle – a 17th-century fortified house now gently decaying.
- Westburn House Do'cote (18th century) – now in the grounds of Cambuslang Golf Club. Westburn House was built in 1685 and demolished at the end of the 19th century. The dovecote is all that remains. It is octagonal, single chambered, with an ogee slate roof, two circular windows and a low door. Around the top, four dove holes and them a continuous stringcourse-cum-pen. Harled in 1978. Inside there are 488 nest-holes with slate perches.
- Wellshot House – original early-19th-century mansion house of Thomas Gray Buchanan, on whose lands the late-19th-century villa suburb was built. This is now divided into flats. The walls to his orchard can be seen on Brownside Road, as well as (so it is claimed) the gatehouse.

=== Churches ===
- Cambuslang Baptist Church (1895, by William Ferguson). New Testament Greek 'classical style' typical of Baptist churches, with an 'ingeniously planned' Memorial Hall at the rear (1932, by Millar and Black). The Baptist congregation was dissolved in 2022, and the building used by a congregation of The Romanian Church of God.
- Cambuslang Flemington Hallside Church (1885, with halls of 1929) in simple lancet style. Located close to Halfway.
- Cambuslang Old Parish Church (1839–41, by David Cousin; chancel rebuilt in 1919–22 to plans drawn up before the First World War in 1913 by MacGregor Chalmers; War Memorial 1921 by MacGregor Chalmers; Halls 1895–97 by A Lindsay Miller, extended 1968). This is the successor to the original and subsequent parish churches, with some memory of its medieval predecessors in its Transitional style, if a bit 'English' in perspective. A stone inscribed 'AMT 1626' inside the spire may be a relic of the first post-reformation kirk. The arms the Heritors are displayed on the walls of the kirk, with those of the Duke of Hamilton, as chief Heritor, appearing a dozen times. The current decorative scheme dates from 1957–58 includes stained glass windows (by Sadie McLellan) showing the Life and Works of St Cadoc, Christ as Head of the Church, symbols of the Passion and Angels. Tapestries, also by McLellan, include an Angus Dei, Burning Bush. The organ of 1896 is by Abbot & Smith of Leeds and was rebuilt in 1968 by Conacher and Co of Huddersfield. The bell is inscribed MIH 1612 (for John Houston, a heritor) and CH (Charles Hogg, an Edinburgh bell-founder). Located in the Kirkhill district of the town.
- St Andrews Church of Scotland (1961–66, by Beveridge & Dallachy). This was part of the new town centre 'with many popular mannerisms'. In one courtyard is a relief of 'Christ and St Andrew' (by Thomas Wallen, who also designed the font and chancel pavement). The furnishings and stained glass windows are 19th-century relics from the demolished Rosebank and West Parish churches. The organ is by Compton. The building has served as Cambuslang Parish Church since the 2008 union Cambuslang Old Parish, Trinity St Paul’s, and St Andrew’s.
- St Bride's Catholic Church is a small church of 1902, possibly on the site of a medieval chapel dedicated to Our Lady. A stained glass window depicting the calling of Peter and Andrew by Gordon Webster stands near the new entrance.
- St Cuthbert's Episcopal Church is the hall of a church planned in 1909 by HD Walton but never built. Land was gifted by Anne, Duchess of Hamilton.
- St Paul's United Free Church (1904–05, by Alexander Petrie).
- Trinity Parish Church (1897–99, by William Ferguson). Originally a United Presbyterian Church, it is of red Corncockle sandstone in a freely interpreted Perp style, advertising the wealth of the surrounding suburb. The stained glass windows show, in the gallery, the 'Resurrection' by Stephen Adam (after 1914) and, in the east aisle, 'Christ's Entry into Jerusalem' by Gordon Webster (1947).

=== Schools ===
- West Coats Primary School. Cambuslang's first school after Cambuslang Public School. During the war it was transformed into a hospital.
- St Bride's Primary School (1936, by John Stewart of the county council). Built as an RC Advanced Division school, in his 'particularly severe stripped classical manner'. The school was rebuilt in the 2010s.
- James Aiton Primary School (a county council erection of 1974, by Edward Allan) This was part of the post-tenement developments. It was formerly single-storey, circular, open planned and pre-fabricated. The school was rebuilt in the 2010s.
- St. Charles Primary School in Newton was demolished and rebuilt in a new location (several hundred yards further up Westburn road) in the 2010s. The original building followed the same wooden-fronted architecture as the first buildings in Westburn village.

=== Public buildings ===
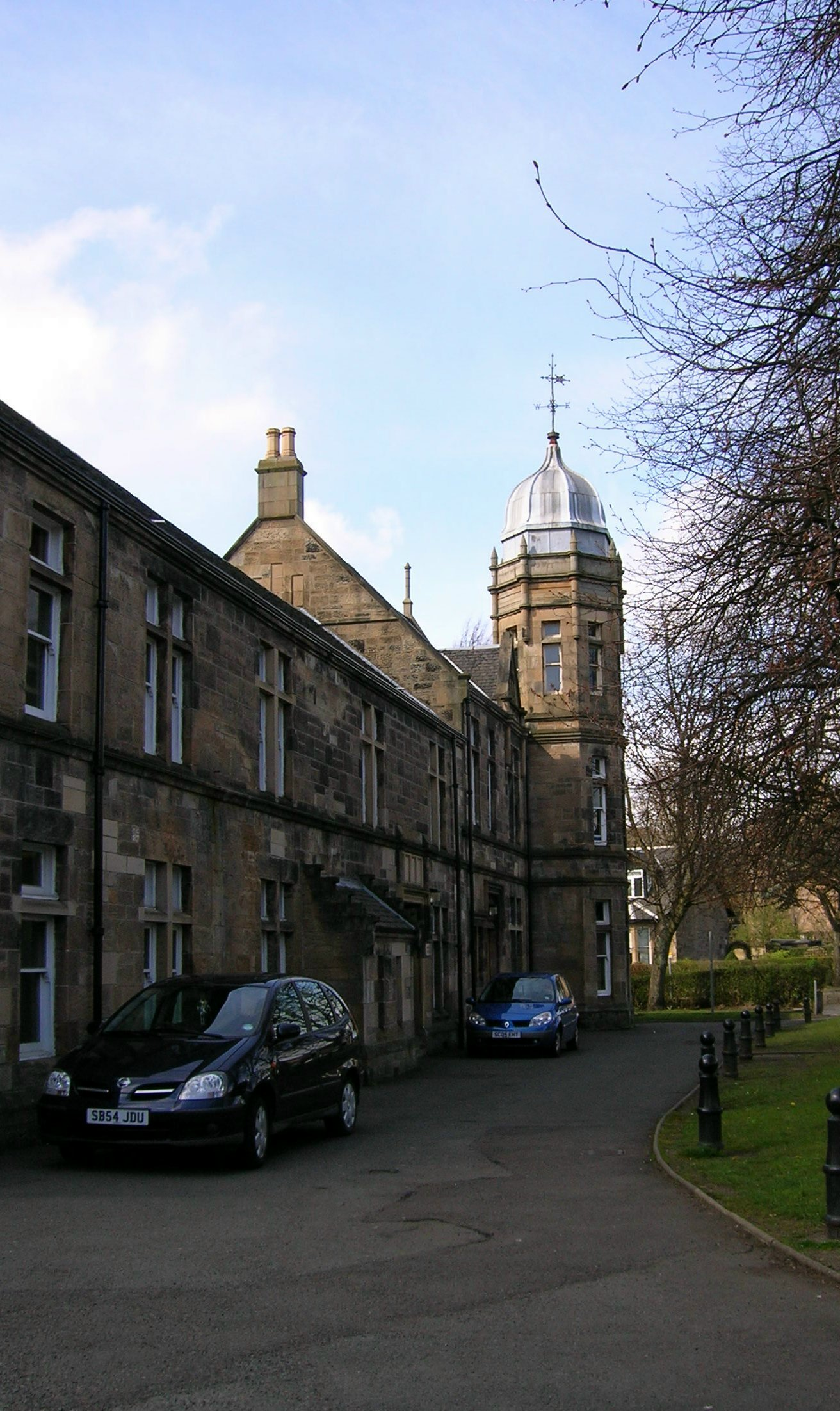
Cambuslang Institute

- Cambuslang Institute was erected 1892–98, by A Lindsay Miller; extended in 1906 and 1910. Interior modernised in 1978–83. It carries on the work started by 19th-century weavers and miners determined to educate themselves.
- Cambuslang Public Library – a county council erection by John Stewart in 1936–38 – 'one long range with stripped classical detail'. Now closed and demolished (April 2007).
- Health Institute (1926, by John Stewart, Lanarkshire County Council architect). It is similar in style to his other buildings if a little more domestic.
- New town centre (completed in 1965) replaced all of the northern half of the Main Street with a new shopping precinct and residences set below and further back than the original tenements, allowing the road to be widened. It had a fine sunken public square in a modernist style, approached by heated ramps and featuring a pond with fountains. Surrounding this were two storeys of shops, the upper levels having their own elevated walkway. The whole of this precinct was connected to the older southern half of the Main Street by two pedestrian subways at the east and west ends. Maisonette-style flats were situated above these shops, with the larger slab-style, 'scissor section' layout Kyle Court high-rise block situated to the east. Three more brutalist grey residential tower blocks were built further to the west. The central section of this development, incorporating the elevated shops with maisonette flats above, was demolished circa 2004, and the eastern pedestrian subway, located near Greenlees Road, was filled in. The replacement development includes local offices for South Lanarkshire Council and Cambuslang Public Library, as well as shop units directly on the Main Street with flats above. As of 2017, however, some of these shop units have failed to find long-term tenants. A small plaque marks the 2001 renovation of the pedestrian precinct, featuring new landscaping and a mural depicting key scenes and figures in the town's history.

=== Domestic architecture ===
- Social housing is pleasant and varied – cottage-flats 'fit for heroes' (1920s); Art Deco brick trim on whitened render (1930s); modernist (1950s and 60s) and brutalist (1960s and 70s).
- Suburban villas in various styles, but mostly standard Scottish Victorian (with a hint of the Italianate).
- Classic Scottish tenements in honey-coloured and red sandstone.
- Police Barracks (1911, converted into sheltered housing in 1982) has an attractive 17th-century doorcase enclosing the arms of Lanarkshire Constabulary.
- Cambuslang Public School (1882–83, by A Lindsay Miller; later an annex of Cambuslang College of the Building Trades; presently a nursing home). Has a decorative façade of Tudor-Gothic style, and plainer extensions of pre-1910 nearby. Now a nursing home.

=== Leisure buildings ===
- Cambuslang Bowling Club, founded in 1874 when the suburb was laid out, has a classical gateway and pavilion with a miniature Baronial tower (all of which may be later).
- Cambuslang Royal Arch Lodge, No.114, is a fine, red sandstone building at 11–13, Tabernacle Lane, dating to 1904. It is home to a Masonic lodge which was founded in 1769, and which formerly had a lodge hall in Kirkhill, South Lanarkshire.

=== Cinemas ===
- The Savoy Cinema was built in 1929 for a local company primarily with facilities for theatre use. The architect was John Fairweather, who was the house architect for the Green's cinema chain, although this particular cinema did not initially have any link with that chain. Fairweather was responsible for designing the two largest cinemas built in Britain, the Green's Playhouses in Dundee and Glasgow. Fairweather's influences were more neo-classical than art deco, and his cinema interiors, including the Cambuslang Savoy, usually had giant columns along the sidewalls. The classical, monumental facade is a landmark on the Main Street, and was for many years a rather garish shade of yellow. It became a bingo hall around the early 1960s, and was renamed Vogue, although it has since reverted to the Savoy name. The building was run by an independent bingo company, the interior is relatively unspoiled. The building is now transformed into a Wetherspoon's pub, named The John Fairweather and was externally repainted November 2014, and opened February 2015. The building has been restored, maintaining original features, and now functions as a classic backdrop to a modern pub and restaurant.
- The Empire was on the corner of Hamilton Road and Clydeford Road, next to the former gas works, between St Andrew's Church and the bus terminus. The exact opening and closing dates of this cinema are not known, but it seems likely it dates from around the 1920s and was closed as a cinema in the 1950s or 1960s. The building remained in increasing dereliction until demolition around 1986.
- The Ritz cinema was built for the ABC chain in 1930 on the site of the current Spar shop. It was designed by William Beresford Inglis, the architect and businessman who later designed and ran the Beresford Hotel in Glasgow's Sauchiehall Street. The Ritz was unusual in that it was an atmospheric cinema, a particular type of design that Beresford specialised in – this meant that the auditorium created the impression of sitting in an outdoor setting, with an open sky above and pseudo-3D buildings along the sidewalls. Inglis generally created these with a Spanish theme, and the Ritz followed this by having its entrance in the form of a large white archway. It was a short-lived cinema, and was closed and demolished in 1960. The Ritz Bar is named after it, and occupies a corner of the site where it once stood.

=== Industrial buildings ===
- Rosebank Dyeworks (1881 until 1945) banded with Greek key pattern in white brick on red and visually very striking, with a double pitched roof and bell turret.
- Hoover factory (1946 and later) was large and modern and emptied in the late 2000s, with housing built on the site a decade later.

=== Bridges ===
There have been three bridges of different types over the River Clyde north of Cambuslang's Main Street. In the early 21st century there is a large supermarket on the Cambuslang side of the bridges, and on the other side is a large industrial estate and the ancient village of Carmyle, both of which are administered by Glasgow City Council.

==== Orion/Rosebank Bridge ====
The earliest crossing over the river (other than informal fords at crossing points which were unsafe when the water levels rose) was a 19th-century wooden mineral railway bridge. It was constructed in the 1850s and named Orion Bridge in commemoration of a naval tragedy involving a paddle steamer of that name which had occurred a few years earlier. The bridge was also known as Rosebank Bridge after Rosebank House, the nearby mansion on the Cambuslang side. For a time the Dunlop Family, operators of the Clyde Iron Works around a mile to the north on the opposite side of the river, were also the owners of Rosebank House, explaining the desire to link the sites. The private railway linked the iron works to the main Clydesdale Junction Railway lines and also provided a source of fuel from local collieries. The Orion connection appears to stem from another previous owner of Rosebank, shipping magnate Sir George Burns, having had a brother who died in the Orion incident. The wooden bridge burned down in a fire in 1919, by which time the iron works were linked to the closer Rutherglen and Coatbridge Railway lines and most of the local coal had been exhausted.

==== Cambuslang/Orion Bridge ====
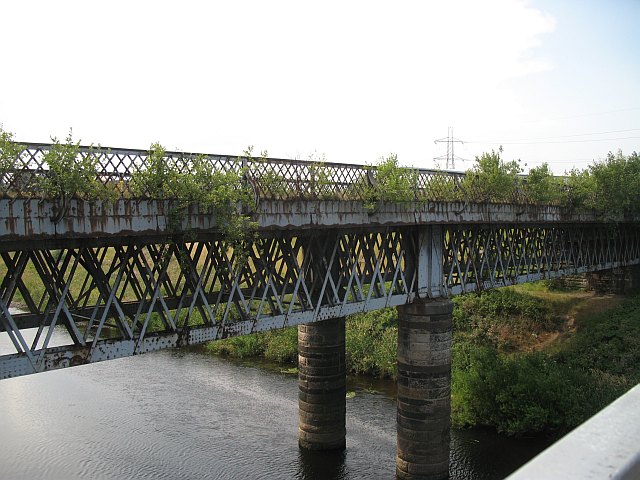
Cambuslang 'Orion' Bridge as seen from footbridge

Cambuslang Bridge which has been referred to as Clyde Bridge and later as Orion Bridge, was built in 1892 by Crouch & Hogg. It was built using the steel lattice girder structure commonly used in rail bridges of the time (see Westburn Viaduct, Dalmarnock Railway Bridge in the vicinity) but historical maps do not show it ever having been used by a railway. For 80 years it carried the main road north towards Tollcross in the East End of Glasgow and was the only such crossing in that part of the city, but weight restrictions meant it became unsuitable for such heavy use and in 1976 a replacement was built upstream. Vehicles continued to use the Cambuslang Bridge to an extent until 1986 when the Bogleshole Road Bridge was built around half a mile downstream.

==== Footbridge ====
Cambuslang Footbridge (constructed by Strathclyde Regional Council in 1977) is where the Clyde Walkway and the National Cycle Route 75 cross from the north to the south bank of the Clyde. The footbridge is just upstream from the original Cambuslang Bridge, and although the older structure is blocked off from vehicular traffic and is becoming overgrown, the fact that it is still in place and can be used freely by pedestrians means that for several decades there have been two bridges serving the same function only a few yards from one another. In 2015 a feasibility study was conducted on creating a new cycling and walking route which would run along the south (Cambuslang) river bank to Farme Cross in Rutherglen via the Clydebridge Steelworks site.

== Cambuslang clergy ==
=== The Catholic Church ===
The revenues of the Parish of Cambuslang (originally Drumsagart) were obviously substantial enough for the priests to carry the title Rector. One – William Monypenny – had enough to endow a Chapel to Our Lady. These revenues also supported Vicars when the Rectors were made Prebendaries and were usually absent, attending to their official duties in Glasgow Cathedral. Cambuslang Parish was obviously a step on the career ladder of ambitious clerics who also had political ambitions. John Cameron (of the Lochiel Campbells) became Bishop of Glasgow – and made the Prebendaries of Cambuslang Chancellors of the Cathedral – and went on to hold all the Great Offices of State. David Beaton probably never even visited his Parish on his way up the ladder to become the Cardinal later murdered by soldiers supporting the Reformation in Scotland.

Both Cameron and Beaton were members of the Scottish aristocracy, as were a number of other Rectors and Prebendaries – such as Lord Claud Hamilton – and the "English Cleric" mentioned below no doubt accompanied the many Anglo-Norman adventurers who came to Scotland at the time. The issues associated with the revenues of Cambuslang, and its entanglement with finding a living for young aristocrats, continued beyond the reformation. The revenues were in the hands of the landowners – the Heritors – who therefore nominated the Ministers, according to the Patronage Act, 1712.

=== The established Protestant churches ===
During the years of the Reformation, Cambuslang clergy were sometimes priests of the Episcopalian Church of Scotland and sometimes Ministers of the Presbyterian Church of Scotland. Several were doughty fighters for Presbyterianism, notably John Howison, while others, such as Patrick Hamilton gave much of their time to (sometimes provocative, not to say scurrilous) poetry. William M'Culloch organised great preaching festivals on the hillsides near his Kirk, inviting one of the founders of Methodism, George Whitefield to preach to upwards of 20,000 people. This "Cambuslang Wark" was part of an extraordinary series of revivalist movements which swept Scotland, England and New England in the 1740s. Subsequently, many of M’Culloch's Elders opposed the Duke of Hamilton's nominee, James Meek as his successor, on the grounds that he was unsound in doctrine. Meek was a typical Moderate in the 18th-century Church of Scotland – well educated, ”enlightened”, well-connected – his friend and supporter was William Robertson, Principal of Edinburgh University – and more concerned with good Christian conduct, which often meant good order, than with what he thought of as the more contentious areas of scholastic Calvinist theology. He won the fight and became a much-loved minister. He was followed in his place by Principal Robertson's nephew. This was John Robertson, who died the year before a great split in the Church of Scotland over the long-standing issues, familiar to his predecessor, of Patronage and doctrine. Later Ministers lived quieter lives. The Robert Blair not only helped translate the Bible into Gaelic, but also found time to translate Gaelic Poetry. Robert Sibbald Calderwood wrote "Bible Stories", but also proclaimed his patriotism on the coronation of George V.

=== Other churches ===
In 1799 some Christians who were not prepared to attend the Parish Kirk, perhaps including some remnants of M’Culloch's Cambuslang Wark, rented a house to hold independent meetings. In 1801, they bought a building, which became known as the Tabernacle, in what is now Tabernacle Lane. David Dale, a Glasgow Merchant who lived nearby, contributed some money for this, and worshipped there himself. Thus began the Congregational Church in Cambuslang. After the Disruption of 1843, a Free Church of Scotland congregation was set up. The Duchess of Hamilton gave land for an Episcopalian Church to serve the needs of English immigrants who had come to work in the Cambuslang collieries and Hallside Steelworks (Newton). Later, Baptists and other Protestant denominations set up chapels, then more substantial churches. Similarly, Catholic immigrants from Ireland and the Highlands were served first by a chapel, then a more substantial church. Meanwhile, the growing population of Cambuslang meant that the Church of Scotland had to set up subsidiary churches – the mission church in Hallside, for example – to accommodate the growing population. These eventually became the separate Parishes of the Church of Scotland – Flemington Hallside Church, Trinity Parish Church and St Andrew's Church of Scotland, are remaining examples. Smaller Protestant Churches were also set up – Westcoats Evangelical Church for example, and the Gospel Hall.

=== Clergy of Cambuslang Parish Church ===
==== Pre-Reformation ====
===== Rectors =====
- William, Rector of Drumsagart, c. 1180
- Conewall, Rector of Cambuslang, c. 1296
- An English Cleric, c. 1319
- William Monypenny, c. 1372
- John de Merton, c. 1387
- William de Fowlis, M.A., c. 1421.
- John Cameron, M.A., c. 1423. Later Bishop of Glasgow
- Thomas Roule c. 1430

===== Prebendaries =====
- Thomas Roule, c. 1430
- John Cameron, c. 1438
- John Raulston, c. 1445 Later Bishop of Dunkeld
- John de Ironhose, c. 1458
- Edward de Calderwood, Vicar, c. 1458
- George Graham, c. 1462
- Alexander Hamilton, M.A., c. 1497–1511
- David Burtoune, Chaplain – Vicar, c. 1500
- James Hamilton, c. 1503
- David Beaton – later Cardinal, c. 1520
- David Hamilton, cleric, c. 1531–1535
- William Hamilton, c. 1552–1570
- John Spreull, c. 1553
- James Lindsay, Vicar, c. 1554
- John Millar, Chaplain, c. 1565
- Lord Claud Hamilton, c. 1574

==== Post-Reformation ministers ====
- James Lyndesay, Reader, 1560–1572
- Adam Foulis, 1572–1580
- John Howison, 1580–1618
- Robert Hamilton, helper
- Alexander Thomson, 1623–1626
- Patrick Hamilton – Curate and poet, 1626–1645
- John Baillie, 1647–1652
- Robert Fleming, 1653–1663
- David Cunningham, Parson, 1663–1688
- Archibald Hamilton, 1688–1723
- William M'Culloch, 1731- 1771
- James Meek, 1774–1810
- John Robertson 1797–1843
- James S Johnson, 1809–1881
- Robert Blair, 1882–1892 as minister
- J E Houston, 1892–1908 as minister
- Robert Sibbald Calderwood, 1864 –

== See also ==
- Cambuslang railway station
- History of Scotland
- List of listed buildings in Cambuslang, South Lanarkshire
