= List of listed buildings in Cambuslang, South Lanarkshire =

This is a list of listed buildings in the parish of Cambuslang in South Lanarkshire, Scotland.

== List ==
Name	Location	Date Listed	Grid Ref. (Note: Sometimes known as OSGB36, the grid reference (where provided) is based on the British national grid reference system used by the Ordnance Survey. • "Guide to National Grid". Ordnance Survey. • "Get-a-map". Ordnance Survey.)	Geo-coordinates	Notes	LB Number (Note: Historic Environment Scotland assign a unique alphanumeric identifier to each designated site in Scotland, for listed buildings this always begins with "LB", for example "LB12345".)	Image
Central Avenue, 5 Beech Avenue, Ashfield Including Boundary Walls And Gatepiers				55°49′07″N 4°10′31″W	Category B	33792	Upload Photo
Flemington Farm (Off Flemington Road)				55°48′06″N 4°07′39″W	Category B	33665	Upload another image
Cambuslang, 13 Tabernacle Lane, Masonic Hall				55°49′06″N 4°09′56″W	Category C(S)	49643	Upload another image
2 Glasgow Road, Beech Avenue, Trinity Parish Church And Halls, Boundary Walls, Gates And Gatepiers				55°49′11″N 4°10′30″W	Category B	33794	Upload another image
6, 6A, 8 Milton Avenue, Wellshot House				55°49′04″N 4°10′50″W	Category B	33796	Upload Photo
Greenlees Road And 2 Tabernacle Street, Former Cambuslang Public School				55°49′04″N 4°10′01″W	Category B	33666	Upload another image
Cairns Road, Cambuslang Old Parish Church Including Churchyard, Boundary Walls, Gates And Gatepiers				55°48′50″N 4°09′47″W	Category B	33659	Upload another image
63, 65 West Coats Road, Including Boundary Walls And Gatepiers				55°48′58″N 4°10′32″W	Category B	33797	Upload Photo
Gilbertfield Castle				55°48′11″N 4°09′02″W	Category B	1060	Upload another image
Burnside Road, Church Avenue, Burnside Parish Church Including Halls, Session House, Boundary Walls And Railings				55°48′51″N 4°11′59″W	Category B	33788	Upload another image
Waterside				55°46′46″N 4°14′18″W	Category C(S)	6630	Upload Photo
60, Brownside Road, West Coats Primary School Including Boundary Walls, Gatepiers, Gates And Railings				55°48′56″N 4°10′32″W	Category B	33787	Upload another image
2A Cadzow Drive, Greenlees Road, Cambuslang Baptist Church Including Boundary Walls, Gates And Railings				55°48′58″N 4°10′02″W	Category C(S)	33790	Upload another image
25 Central Avenue, Hotel				55°49′09″N 4°10′44″W	Category B	33791	Upload Photo
4 Central Avenue, 21 Wellshot Drive				55°49′05″N 4°10′28″W	Category B	33793	Upload Photo
Main Street, Savoy Bingo Club (Former Savoy Cinema)				55°49′07″N 4°09′58″W	Category C(S)	51158	Upload another image
4 Busheyhill Street, Former School				55°49′03″N 4°10′03″W	Category B	33789	Upload another image
37 Greenlees Road, Cambuslang Institute Including Boundary Walls				55°49′00″N 4°10′03″W	Category B	33795	Upload another image
Clydeford Road, Dovecot At Cambuslang Golf Course				55°49′19″N 4°09′44″W	Category B	33664	Upload another image
7, 7A Cairns Road, Cambuslang Old Parish Church Hall				55°48′49″N 4°09′44″W	Category C(S)	33660	Upload another image

== Key ==
The scheme for classifying buildings in Scotland is:

- Category A: "buildings of national or international importance, either architectural or historic; or fine, little-altered examples of some particular period, style or building type."
- Category B: "buildings of regional or more than local importance; or major examples of some particular period, style or building type, which may have been altered."
- Category C: "buildings of local importance; lesser examples of any period, style, or building type, as originally constructed or moderately altered; and simple traditional buildings which group well with other listed buildings."

In March 2016 there were 47,288 listed buildings in Scotland. Of these, 8% were Category A, and 50% were Category B, with the remaining 42% being Category C.

== See also ==
- Buildings of Cambuslang
- History of Cambuslang
