= Cathkin High School =

Coordinates: 55.81288°N 4.181950°W

Location
- Langlea Road; Cambuslang, South Lanarkshire, G72 8ES; Scotland

Information
- Type: Secondary School Comprehensive School
- Established: 1970
- Closed: Moved to a new building nearby in October 2008
- Local authority: South Lanarkshire
- Ofsted: Reports
- Head Teacher: Joanne Sturgeon
- Staff: 81.4 FTE
- Gender: Mixed
- Age: 11 to 18
- Enrolment: 1081 (2018)
- Houses: Arran, Barra, Jura, Skye and Tiree
- Colours: Red, yellow, black
- School years: S1-S6
- Feeder Schools: Cathkin Primary School; Cairns Primary School; Hallside Primary School; Loch Primary School; West Coats Primary School
- Website: http://www.cathkin.s-lanark.sch.uk/

Cathkin High School is a state secondary school in Cambuslang, South Lanarkshire (Greater Glasgow), Scotland.

== History ==
The original school was built at a cost of £1.25 million and opened in November 1970 (official duties being performed by politician Peggy Herbison), around the same time as the neighbouring housing scheme at Whitlawburn was completed. It replaced Gateside School in central Cambuslang (the campus of which was thereafter occupied by Trinity High School then by South Lanarkshire College, before being demolished in 2008).

In 2008, the school relocated to a new campus (also accommodating a nursery and a special school, Rutherglen High School) on a site previously used designated as the school's playing fields situated immediately north of its original buildings, which were subsequently demolished and redeveloped for housing (the Cathkin Rise estate by Barratt).

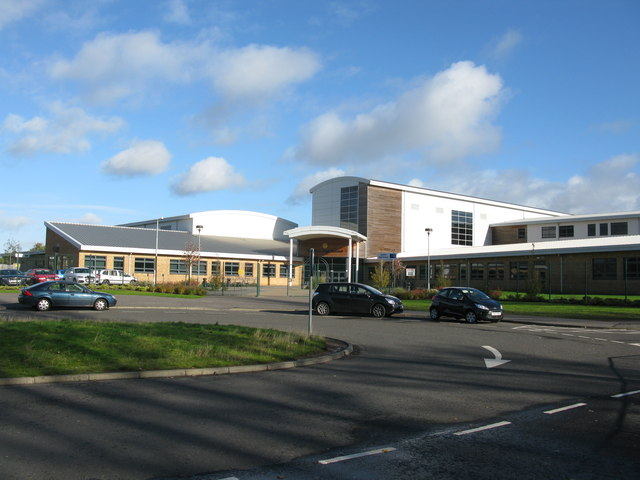
View of the main school building, 2013

As of September 2015 the school had 1004 pupils on the school roll and 88 full-time equivalent staff.

In May 2018, the school won the Scottish Senior Boys Shield in football for the first time, after beating St Ninian's High School, Giffnock on penalties in the final.

== Feeder schools ==
Cairns Primary (Halfway), Cathkin Primary (Cathkin/Fernhill), Hallside Primary (Drumsagard Village), Loch Primary (Whitlawburn / Springhall), West Coats Primary (Cambuslang / Kirkhill).

== Notable former pupils and teachers ==
Notable former pupils include:

- Darren Young, footballer and manager
- Derek Young, footballer
- Duncan Weir, professional rugby union player
- Kenny McLean professional footballer
