= John Robertson (Scottish minister) =

Minister of Cambuslang

John Robertson (1768–1843) was Minister of Cambuslang from 1810 until his death. He was responsible for that Parish's entry in the Second Statistical Account of Scotland dated 1836, though he did not write it himself. (The text modestly contrasts "the author of the present text" (actually, the Rev. William Patrick) with "the present venerable and learned incumbent of Cambuslang")

He was nephew of the Scottish Enlightenment historian William Robertson, Principal of Edinburgh University.

Robertson was born c. 1768, he was licensed by the Presbytery of Lanark on 8 May 1795, when he was made assistant to Dr Meek, his predecessor. He was ordained as assistant minister on 22 August 1797 and took over the Parish as Minister in 1810 on the death of Dr Meek. His one publication, "Lay Preaching indefensible on Scriptural Principles," appeared in octavo form, in Glasgow, 1800 followed swiftly by a pamphlet rebutting criticism of his arguments. In 1813 he married Sarah, eldest daughter of William Shaw, bookseller, Glasgow. He had two sons, both educated at Glasgow University. The elder, William, was Minister of Monivaird in Strathearn from 1843 until his death in 1864. He was a composer of many hymns, including "A little child the saviour came". The younger son, Alexander, became a "clerk" in the Glasgow Royal Infirmary, and later died from a wound he received while assisting at a dissection. He also had four daughters one of whom, Elizabeth died along with her mother, in 1831, possibly of cholera. We know the name of another daughter, Joanna, who survived and married.

Glasgow University conferred the degree of D.D upon Mr Robertson in 1826, possibly in recognition of his work among the poor. In 1826, he argued for and secured a contract to improve the Turnpike Road giving work to the unemployed. He was in ill health from at least 1833 and often had to call on fellow ministers for help. The last Kirk Session which he chaired personally was 2 January 1842. He died 2 February 1843, some four months before an historical split in the Church of Scotland. He had received his own post as minister from the Patronage of the Duke of Hamilton, so he may not have been in sympathy with those who left the Church on this issue. Neither do his publications seem to indicate he would have been on the side of the secessionists. These became the Free Church of Scotland part of which eventually re-united with the Church of Scotland in 1929. He is buried in the churchyard.

The current Church building - Cambuslang Old Parish Church - was built during his ministry. (The entry in the Statistical Account complains about the state of the church and manse in 1836). There were also extensive alterations in 1896.

Dr Robertson's assistant was the Rev William Bain - a versifier given to making fun of the church members.
