= Moderate Party (Scotland) =

Group of clerics in the Church of Scotland

The Moderate Party as a church term normally refers to an important group of clerics in the Church of Scotland in the 18th century. It is often contrasted with the Evangelicals, but that is very much a simplification. Most members of both parties considered themselves orthodox Christians and the leaders Principal Robertson for the Moderates and his Edinburgh University colleague, John Erskine for the Evangelicals, had a very warm and mutually respectful relationship.

- They were characteristically very much part of the Scottish Enlightenment contributing to and deriving intellectual nourishment from an impressive range of scholarly activities of the time: literary, philosophical, historical and scientific.
- They shared, far too easily in the view of critics, widespread scepticism of Puritanical enthusiasm evident in the many revival movements of the age. (Dr James Meek's cool appraisal of the "Cambuslang Wark" is a good example.)
- They distrusted dogmatism and what they thought of as overly-intricate system building. In the eyes of some critics, that led them close to heresy or at least far from the Westminster Confession of Faith, which was then the acknowledged foundation of Reformed Christianity in Scotland.
- Their preaching concentrated, too much so in some eyes, on Christian conduct, rather than the details of creed. “It was of great importance”, said one, “to discriminate between the artificial virtues and vices, formed by ignorance and superstition, and those that are real".
- Lastly, they had profound respect for the established hierarchies of both Church and Government. That attitude was shared with Lutheranism and indeed cited scriptural authority for it. It was also congenial to the Scottish ruling class, which appointed ministers by using the Patronage Acts.

The right of the landowning gentry to nominate ministers to parishes and its consequent influence on church matters underlay the various Secessions (of 1733 and 1752, in particular) from the Church of Scotland, which took place in the 18th century. However, the theological differences between Moderates and Evangelicals were significant indeed. For example, James Meek was a typical Moderate who had been nominated by the Duke of Hamilton and opposed by his Cambuslang parishioners on aspects of his preaching.

On the other hand, the significant achievements and stature of many Moderate clerics – such as Principal William Robertson of Edinburgh University and onetime Moderator of the General Assembly of the Church of Scotland; his successor as principal and moderator, George Baird, who set up the Church's education system; Thomas Reid, philosopher; George Campbell, theologian; Adam Ferguson, philosopher and historian; John Home, dramatic poet; and Hugh Blair, literary scholar, makes it difficult to dismiss them as insincere placemen.

As one later evangelical minister (WH Porter in References below) said, the Moderates "gave us our Paraphrases; Campbell, who replied to Hume, M'Knight the communicator, Hill the theologian, and Blair the preacher, were Moderates. Though in 1796, the Moderates were mainly, not entirely, responsible for the defeat of Foreign Missions proposals, yet in 1829, the Mission to India was founded by Dr Inglis, a Moderate. Principles Blair and M'Farlane were both moderates, yet to the one the Church of Scotland owes her Education Scheme, to the other her Colonial scheme".
