= William M'Culloch =

William M'Culloch (1691 – 18 December 1771) was Minister of Cambuslang during the extraordinary events of the Cambuslang Work (1742) when 30,000 people gathered in the hillsides near his church for preaching and communion. Many were there struck by their own depravity and horrified at the probable punishment after death. Trembling, wailing, great pain, nose-bleeding and other strange behaviour was followed in some cases by striking conversions when they suddenly felt accepted by Christ. This gave rise to great rejoicing and singing. It was later calculated that about 400 people had been converted, though many had backslided. The Reverend M’Culloch was a strange person to be at the centre of this phenomenon — one that was being repeated in the American Colonies at the time. He was a poor preacher and claimed never to have experienced the strong feelings of sin or conversion that so many others had reported.

== Context — Covenanters and Patronage ==
He was born in 1691, the son of the schoolmaster at Whithorn, in Galloway. The late 17th century was a troubled time. Three years earlier, William of Orange had landed in England and was now establishing himself and his wife Mary Stuart as joint sovereigns of England and, separately, of Scotland and Ireland — replacing the Catholic King James II of England, VII of Scotland, his wife's father. One of the key issues underlying this so-called Glorious Revolution, at least in Scotland, was the structure of the Church of Scotland. King James had wanted it to be Episcopal, as the Church of England was, with bishops appointed by the King. Many in Scotland wanted a more Presbyterian type of structure, where each local church was governed by a Kirk Session of Elders, that is converted Christians. Kirk Sessions were to be responsible for the correct behaviour of everyone in their Parish and had the power to appoint suitably qualified persons as the Parish Minister. Parishes were grouped into area Presbyteries which in turn were grouped into large area Synods. The General Assembly was a representative body of all the Parishes, Presbyteries and Synods. Galloway, where William M’Culloch was born and received his early education, was an area of particularly fervent Presbyterianism. During the previous eighty years it has seen a great deal of support for resistance to the Scottish government, in the form of bands of Covenanters — those who wished to see the country governed by those who had experienced Christian conversion.

The new King — William II of Scotland — was from a Dutch Presbyterian background but was wary of scope for unrest in such a structure, without some safeguards. These his successor (Queen Anne) finally introduced in 1712 by the Patronage Act. This gave the power to nominate Parish Ministers to local landowners — the Heritors. It was still up to the Kirk Session to appoint another person (with the agreement of the Presbytery), but this would be without the salary, house, etc., provided by the Heritors. This ancient power had been abolished in 1649, (during the Commonwealth), restored (with the Restoration in 1660 and abolished in the first place by William in 1690 before he re-imposed it in 1712). It led to many struggles between Kirk Sessions and Heritors throughout the 18th and 19th Centuries — including the appointment of Mr M’Culloch — and finally to three secessions from the Kirk.

== Education and anxiety ==
The young William M’Culloch grew up in the thick of this tumult and his father noticed early on his studious and serious manner. It was decided to educate him for the church ministry. He was so much impressed by the local Minister, Mr Ker, and was persuaded to join the church formally when he was thirteen by taking communion. He then studied, first at Edinburgh University, then at Glasgow where he took his degree on 26 April 1712, just as the Patronage Act was coming into force. He was very competent in the languages of Holy Scripture — Latin, Greek and, particularly, Hebrew — but was also so skilled in Mathematics and Astronomy that he taught them to boys in Glasgow (and displaying great manual skill in producing learning materials for demonstrations). He was also very keen on the details of Calvinist theology, particularly that with regard to salvation. However, he was a painfully slow speaker, and this partly explains why it was not until ten years after graduating that he was licensed to preach by his local presbytery of Wigton. When he preached at local sacramental occasions, he was known as the "yil (ale) minister" as the congregations took his ascent into the pulpit as an opportunity to rise and go to the local alehouse "neglecting spiritual food in the search of bodily refreshment".

Another reason might have been his anguished self-examination on whether he was fit to be a minister at all. These anxieties he poured out to a neighbouring minister, Mr Wodrow of Eastwood, at the time of his call to Cambuslang. He felt he was "nothing but a hollow hypocrite" because he had been preaching since his ordination on the nature of Conversion and was a "perfect stranger to it himself". He was always very serious and dutiful, and preferred the company of righteous people, but had no inward experience of conversion. He had been "haunted with atheistic thoughts and blasphemous suggestions". He was jealous and suspicious of friends (he said) and complained of his own pride and "self-carnality". He was also much depressed by conversations with ordinary people, who told him about their experiences of conversion, which "he has been a stranger to". Mr Wodrow thought him a sincere, studious and depressive sort of person, with the tendency of such people to be over-critical of themselves and rather obsessive on the details of theological study. He advised Mr M’Culloch that his obvious sincerity and great knowledge both scripture and doctrine made him a far better person to be a minister than many he knew. Mr Wodrow noted the many "bodily marks" of Mr M’Culloch’s anguish — including piercing headaches. It is obvious he was going through some sort of mental breakdown, though he did report that he got some solace from reading the Bible in extreme times, when he longed for death.

Certainly, Mr M’Culloch’s talents had not been unappreciated. In 1725, he had been asked by members of the Town Council to preach the "Annual Sermon for the Reformation of Manners" and had been chaplain and tutor to the Hamilton family Aitkenhead, near Glasgow.

== Call to Cambuslang ==
The Duke of Hamilton was the Patron of Cambuslang and he wanted to nominate (or "present") another candidate, one Mr Finlater, when the Reverend Archibald Hamilton, Minister of Cambuslang, died in 1724. The Kirk Session was determined to have Mr William M’Culloch and a struggle lasting eight years only ended when Mr Finlater found a post elsewhere. During the interval, the parish was neglected. On 18 February 1731 Mr M’Culloch received the official call from Cambuslang was ordained by the Presbytery of Hamilton for the Church and Parish of Cambuslang on 29 April. It was at this time that he went in distress to Mr Wodrow of Eastwood and it was perhaps because of his physical and mental state that he did not fulfil his duties immediately. For three years and three months no communion services were held and the schooling was neglected.

It should also be said that Mr M’Culloch’s attempts to get the (perhaps disgruntled) Heritors to repair the dilapidated church met with little success. He therefore began preaching in a tent next to the church, using letters and printed sermons from New England detailing the extraordinary events taking place there — the so-called First Great Awakening. The lack of a minister for many years had led to a huge number of "fellowships", or praying societies, in the parish. Now Mr M’Culloch added another ingredient — the letters and sermons were supplemented by sermons on his own specialist theme "Regeneration: its nature and necessity". Mr M’Culloch’s readings from the pulpit, along with his private conversations with concerned parishioners, laid a solid foundation for the historical events that soon followed — the extraordinary events known as the Cambuslang Work — or "wark" in Scots — referring to the "work of the Lord". Later, Mr M’Culloch claimed some 400 people had been converted during the Cambuslang Work, including 70 from Cambuslang itself. It is typical of his modesty that we do not know if he himself ever eventually experienced conversion, though he did exclaim at one point during his last illness "The whole is shortly summed up in the words of Jesus Christ; ‘He that believeth and is baptised shall be saved; but he that believeth not shall be damned’"

== Final years ==
His own fame grew. Despite his slowness of delivery, his thoughtfulness and his teachings were widely admired and he was often asked to preach in other parishes. He wrote out two sermons a week and committed them to memory. His son, Robert M’Culloch, also a minister (at Dairsie in Fife), published his father's sermons after his death. He spent a lot of his own money paying for distributing texts of Scripture and the Shorter Catechism to children in Scotland and America. He secretly gave £200 to the recently established Society in Scotland for Propagating Christian Knowledge in Edinburgh. Dean Stanley in his Lectures described Mr M’Culloch as "no wild fanatic, but a learned, unostentatious scholar, a slow, cautious and prudent parish minister".

Eventually, Mr M’Culloch persuaded the Heritors to repair the church and a "neat, plain edifice" was erected, a new manse following in 1756. On 29 April 1736, he married Janet Dunwoodie, and had one son, Robert. He was very ill towards the end of his life, needing the support of two helpers to lead him from the manse to the kirk on Sundays. He died on 18 December 1771 and was buried in the churchyard " amid the tears and lamentations of an affectionate people". His tombstone, now attached to the church wall, stated "He was eminently successful in preaching the Gospel". His wife died eight years later.

== Bibliography ==
- M’Culloch, Robert Posthumous collection of 13 sermons of Rev William M’Culloch Edinburgh 1793
- M’Culloch, Rev William A sermon against the idolatrous worship of the Church of Rome. Preach'd in the New-Church of Glasgow, the fifth of November, 1725 (The Annual Sermon For the Reformation of Manners) Glasgow 1725
