= Patrick Hamilton (poet) =

Patrick Hamilton (c. 1575 – May 1658) was a minister of The Church of Scotland during a turbulent period in Scotland’s history. He seems to have chosen the wrong side in the dispute between King Charles I and the Scottish Covenanters. He was also a poet, writing in a straightforward English (as opposed to Scots) style, expressing his religious and political beliefs, and longing for a period of peace.

In 1596 he was Minister at Lochwinnoch then in 1607 he moved to Paisley. In 1626 he was presented to the Parish of Cambuslang by James, Marquis of Hamilton, a significant player in Scottish politics. Patrick may not have been related to the family, but his connection to the Marquis of Hamilton was to cost him his career and he was to die in obscure poverty.

Hamilton sets out his religious position in a poem called "A Schort Description of the Trew Properties of a Faithful Sheiphard of Christes Flock". It is unapologetically a Protestant Calvinist position.

I doe believe in God alone
Noe Saviour but that I know
No way to Heaven is but one,
Noe ruell of Faith but God’s pure law.

He has little time for rituals, prelates or hypocrisy. On the other hand, he seems to have a more moderate, or at least conservative, outlook than many clergy at the time.

"I hate all needless novelties", and
"I follow none of frantick fits"

His own approach to his ministry is clear

Noe frowne or fauning of my staite
Can dashe me downe or mount me hie
To speik the truth I am not blaite,
And calles things as their natures be;
I tymouslie forwarne my flock,
When wolffs and foxes are at hand
I bark, and with my sheiphards crook
In their defence whill death I stand."

Nonetheless, Patrick was a member of the momentous General Assembly of the Church of Scotland which met in Glasgow in 1638 and proclaimed the National Covenant, abolished bishops and established Presbyterianism as the form of government for the Church of Scotland. This set them on a collision course with King Charles I which would lead to the Civil Wars and the execution of the King.

Hamilton not only supported, and signed, the National Covenant but wrote a long poem in support of it, Some Few Verses in Commendatione of the Covenant and subscribers thereto. However, his patron was James, Marquis of Hamilton, who was one of the leaders of the King’s forces sent to Scotland to face the gathering Covenanter armies. The Marquis arrived off Leith in May 1639 and Patrick may have joined him there. There is a letter from the Marquis to the King’s Commissioner, the Earl of Rothes, headed "From aboord the Rainbow, in Leith Road, 23 Maij 1639" to which there is attached a footnote, which is a poem "Verses on the Rainbow by Patrick Hamilton, Minister of Cambuslang". In fact there is only one verse of seven rhyming couplets, sadly contrasting the natural rainbow - a promise of peace - with the Rainbow carrying the promise of war. Not long afterwards, the Covenanter army was told to disperse at Duns, Scottish Borders. It did not, but proceeded into England, eventually leading to a (short-lived) Treaty with the King. Patrick wrote a short poem called "Upon the Scottish army at Dunce Law June 18th 1639". He seems to have seen this as some sort of victory against the "Cold Covenanters and base cowards all" and looks forward to the restoration of order.

You flieing Scots who would have wished our fall
Hing down your heads, and look with blushing face
On Dunce blist hill, from whence proceeds our peace
Praise be God’s name, bliss’d be our gracious King
Who made our foes to sigh, our friends to sing

He later wrote two verses "To the English Nobles" beginning "You worthie English nobles of renown", thanking them for defeating the Covenanters.

Last June in which to Dunce we bad adieu
And without straik of sword, we did our foes subdue

He did not like the news of the Covenanter success in the North. He wrote a one verse poem called "Upon the deceitful Covenanted in and about Aberdeen", declaring "Boyne, Banf and Breichen, Satan’s viperous brood" and lambasting

Thow boastful Aberdeen, Our Nation’s bane
Thy factious Doctors and their hellish train

But he still seems to think 1639 was a turning point for peace and wrote in "Upon the blessed lot of '39 Year" that "our fiercest foes, Our Lord made faithful friends" and looked forward to a time when all would be

United in one Ysle and one Religion
Using one language,(sic) joined under one Crown

In 1641 he wrote "Scotland’s Thanksgiving to the Lord for her armies safe, joyful and ponderous returning from England", perhaps realising how things were really playing out.

Other poems known to have been written by Patrick Hamilton are "A Poem on the Creation, Fall and Redemption of Mankind", where he signs himself "A Curate on the Clyde", and (apparently) a translation of Zachary Boyd's "Christian Hecatomb".

In 1645 his name was found on a list of persons offered "protection" from the King’s armies (presumably because of his connection with the Marquis). Because of this he was deposed by the General Assembly. He petitioned to be reinstated and the Assembly was just about to do so when, according to a letter from Robert Baillie who was present, Patrick "let fall out of his pocket a poem too invective against the Church's proceedings. This, by a mere accident, came into the hands of Mr Murdo Law, who gave it to Mr James Guthrie, and he did read it to the Assembly, to Mr Patrick’s confusion". He was not reinstated, and died in extreme poverty in May 1658. His wife Katherine and children (one of whom, his son Patrick, was at the University) were given help by the Kirk Session of Cambuslang in January 1659 and June 1662 (just at the time of the Restoration, two years too late for Patrick). There was a collection among churches in Lothian in October 1660 for her "on account of her necessitous and indigent condition, especially considering she is a minister’s relict, and a minister’s daughter, and has the approbation of a good Christian". The following year she got £60 from Parliament, and there the record ends.

== References and sources ==
- Glen, Duncan. Four Scottish Poets of Cambuslang and Dechmont Hill 1620 - 1990 AKROS Edinburgh 1996
- Peterkin, Alexander. Records of the Kirk of Scotland, Containing Acts and Proceedings of the General Assemblies from the year 1638 Downwards Volume 1
- Porter, Wm Henry. Cambuslang and its Ministers (in Mitchell Library - Glasgow Collection, reference GC941.433 CAM 188520 Box 952)
- Scott, Hew. Fasti Ecclesiae Scoticanae V4: The Succession of Ministers in the Church of Scotland from the Reformation Edinburgh 1922
- Wilson, James Alexander. A History of Cambuslang: a Clydesdale parish. Jackson Wylie & Co Glasgow (1929)
