= Kirkhill, South Lanarkshire =

Coordinates: 55.813°N 4.164°W

Kirkhill: Scottish Gaelic: Cnoc na Cille
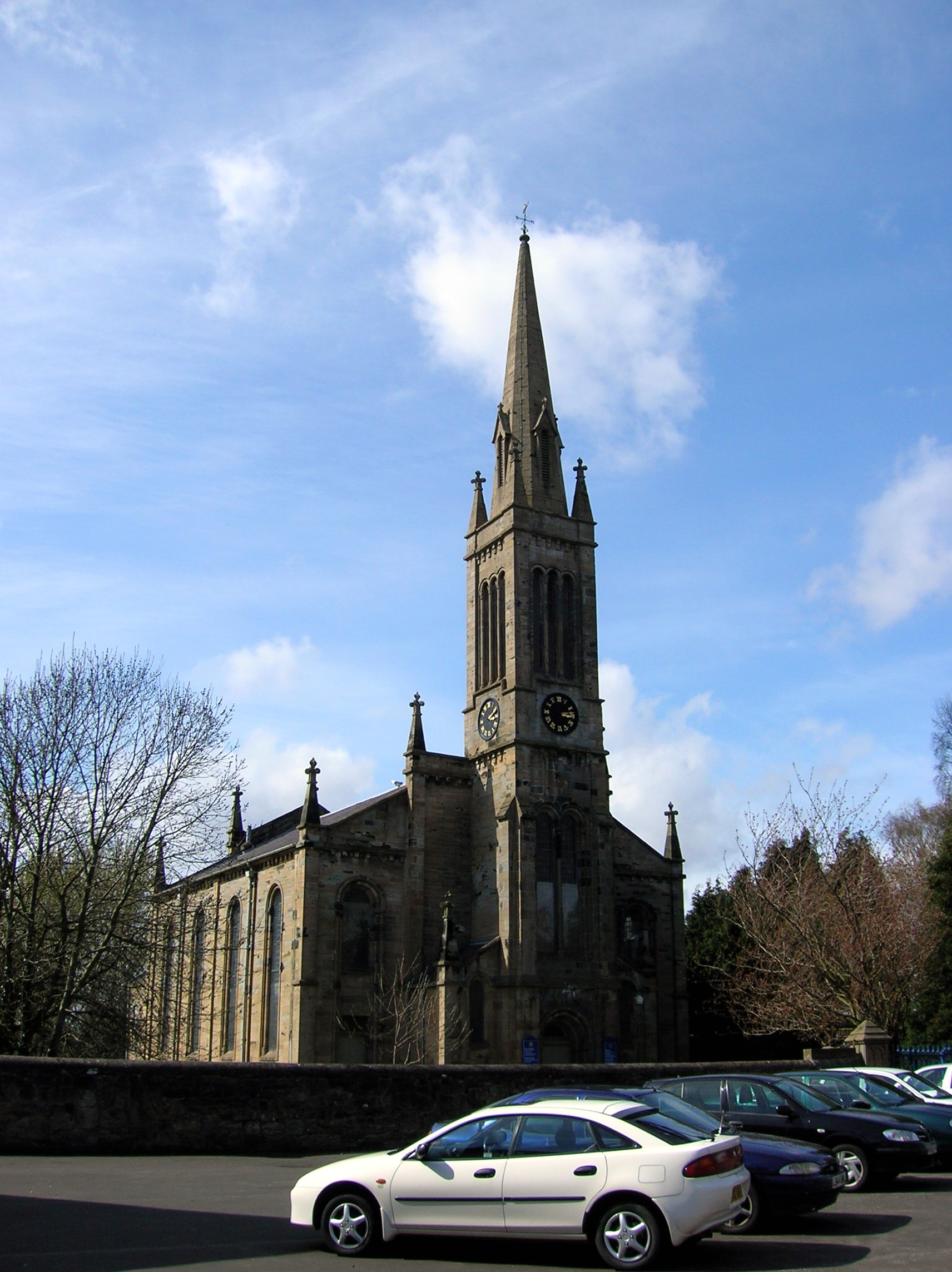
- Cambuslang Old Parish Church (after which Kirkhill is named)

- Location within Scotland Kirkhill (Scotland)
- Country: Scotland
- Sovereign state: United Kingdom
- Post town: GLASGOW
- Postcode district: G72 8
- Dialling code: 0141
- Police: Scotland
- Fire: Scottish
- Ambulance: Scottish
- UK Parliament: Rutherglen and Hamilton West
- Scottish Parliament: Rutherglen

Kirkhill (Scottish Gaelic: Cnoc na Cille) is a district of the town of Cambuslang, South Lanarkshire, Scotland.

== History ==
Kirkhill is one of the oldest parts of Cambuslang, growing up around the church after which the area is named (see History of Cambuslang). The existing building dates from 1841, although it is known that a church was at that location from the 15th century. Nowadays this neighbourhood is mostly tenement and maisonette apartments with a few shops and a local public house, as well as the old church – by 2017 it was no longer being used for services, with its congregation having merged with that of St Andrew's Church located in the modern centre of the town; proposals were made for it to be sold to a local nursery school and converted for their use. The adjacent recreational hall is still used by local groups.

Down the hill towards Hamilton Road is an Aldi supermarket (built on the site of Gateside Secondary School), the town's medical clinic and bowling club (Whitefield B.C., who play on the former ground of 19th century football club Cambuslang F.C.) The area was the home of the boxer Scott Harrison when he was young.

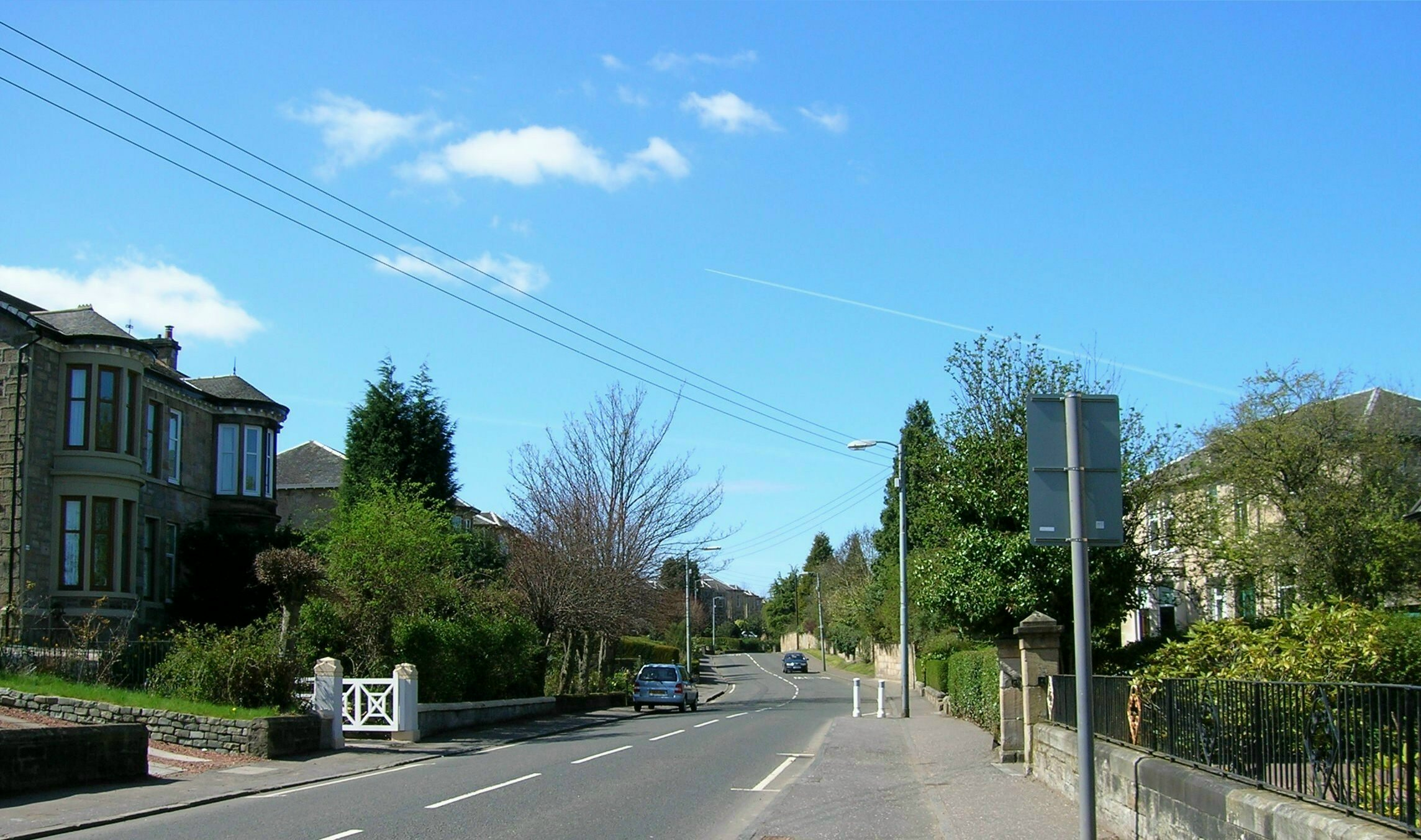
19th Century houses in Brownside Road

A further expanse of wide streets lined with sandstone villas, running east–west between West Coats Primary School and Cambuslang Public Park (containing many of the town's most affluent residences), is also loosely referred to as Kirkhill due to the commuter train station serving the area – Kirkhill railway station opened on 1 August 1904 - but historically this was two farms and mining hamlets known as West Coats and East Coats. This wider territory includes a second bowling club (Kirkhill BC, 1905) and a tennis club (Kirkhill LTC, 1915), and is close to Coats Park (home of Cambuslang Rugby Club), Holmhills Park, a third bowling club (Cambuslang BC), and Cathkin High School.

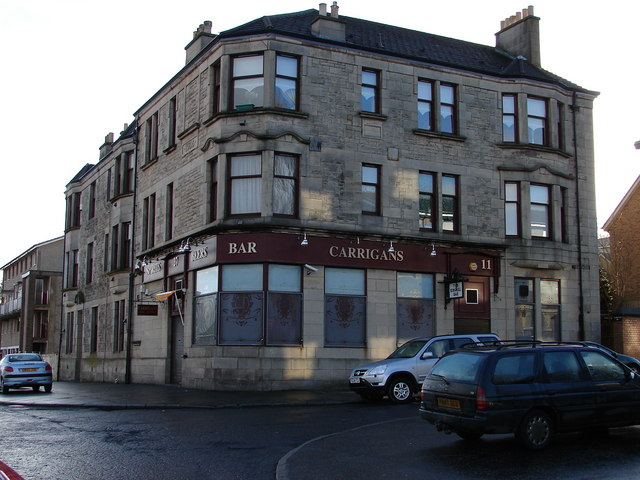
Carrigans Bar in Kirkhill

From 2007 to May 2017, the older Kirkhill neighbourhood was administered as part of the Cambuslang East ward of the South Lanarkshire Council area, while the streets to the south of the railway lines were in the Cambuslang West ward. In a reorganisation as part of the 2017 Scottish local elections, both areas were included in Cambuslang West.

The popular Kirkhill Golf Club is not actually within the district; it is located about one mile away up the hill to the south.
