= John Howison =

John Howison (or Howisone, Howisoune, or Howieson, c. 1530 – 1618) was Minister in the Parish of Cambuslang during a turbulent time in Scotland’s history. He was imprisoned several times for his campaign for a Presbyterian, as opposed to Episcopal structure for the Church of Scotland. (He was always very quickly released). He also often reprimanded the King James VI for taking the advice of evil counsellors. He quarrelled with his own parishioners and was convicted of publishing a doctored version of an Act of Parliament, but he died peacefully in Cambuslang, apparently resigned to accepting Bishops in the Kirk.

== Legacy ==
He wrote a catechism and a work defending the Protestant view of Scripture against the work of the great Cardinal Bellarmine. He established the first known public school in Cambuslang as well as the Howison Bursary (1613) which, along with the Trades House of Glasgow supported a poor student in the University of Glasgow. The Trades House had a (much damaged) portrait of him taken in 1609, though it was damaged beyond recognition by a fire, and he is still commemorated in the University as a benefactor. His Howison Trust maintained two poor men of the Parish in the Hospital (that is, Poor House of Hamilton) right up until the 20th century. Two silver communion cups designed by Gilbert Kirkwood and assayed in Edinburgh in 1618 are still used in the Church, and are known as the Howison Cups, because of an inscription thought to refer to him. Howies Hill near the Parish Church in Cambuslang is most likely to be remembrance of him. The Presbyterian form of Church governance which he fought for was not firmly instituted until eighty years after his death (following the invasion of William of Orange. It is still the form of the Church of Scotland today and to many of its members John Howison is a hero. (In fact, most of what we know about him comes from historians who obviously hero worshiped him, though one did admit that there was "more force than charity" in some of his words.)

== Life ==
=== Ordination and opposition ===
We do not know when and where John Howison was born but he was a student at Glasgow University while Andrew Melville was Principal there. From him, he imbibed a strict Presbyterianism. He graduated in about 1576, not long after Protestantism had been established by law in Scotland, but before the form of the Reformed Church had been finalised. He was then ordained and took up his first post at Kelso (including the parish of Sprouston and the districts of Maxwell and Lempitlaw). He did not remain there long, leaving on 11 October 1577. It is not known where he then went. He is recorded to have been at Glassford between 1587 and 1588 but it is suggested that this is a misprint for 1577/1578, for he took up his post in Cambuslang in 1580.

He was nominated to this post by the major local landowner James, Earl of Arran at the request of King James VI and his Council. The Reformed Church needed trustworthy ministers in parishes vacated by Catholic priests across the country. His appointment was in due course confirmed by the King. Howison must already have been a man of promise if not of distinction.

In 1581 Howison was a member of the General Assembly of the Church of Scotland. There he objected, along with others, to the King’s appointment as the new Archbishop of Glasgow of The Minister of Stirling Robert Montgomery. He objected on principal, claiming Bishops were against the Word of God but he claimed that Mr Montgomery was an unfit person to lead Christians. The King nonetheless ordered the Church to accept him as Archbishop. On 8 June 1582 Montgomery entered into Glasgow Cathedral to claim his see. By this time Howison was Moderator of the Presbytery of Glasgow which was at that time meeting in the Cathedral. Howison demonstrated his opposition to the entry of the new archbishop by climbing into the pulpit and beginning to preach before the archbishop arrived. The archbishop arrived to claim the pulpit, accompanied by the Lord Provost of Glasgow Sir Mathew Stewart of Minto - one of Howison’s own Cambuslang Parishioners - and other leading citizens. There was a stand-off. Sir Mathew ordered Howison out of the pulpit and in response Howison called upon Minto in the name of God to do nothing to disturb the peace. Some rough handling ensued and Howison was dragged - apparently by the beard - from the pulpit and had some of his teeth knocked out. He was then taken to the Trongate - the town gaol. Some armed students tried to rescue him, but they were bloodily put down. The Church responded by excommunicating Archbishop Montgomery. Howison was released from prison after three days. The General Assembly, meeting later that month also tried to excommunicate the Lord Provost of Glasgow and his supporters. These did not bother to appear to their answer charges and the King called the case to his own Council, meeting at Perth on 6 July. The Assembly sent a letter to the King complaining of many things including "the violent drawing of Mr John Howison out of his judgement seat where he was placed as Moderator of the Presbytery, his cruel and outrageous handling and carrying to prison like a thief by the bailies of Glasgow…" After some manoeuvring Sir Mathew submitted to the Assembly. The Assembly then demanded that those who had perpetrated the "unaccustomed violence against Mr Howison" should be "sua punischt that nane hereafter be bald to attempt the lyke" (sic). However, the King had meanwhile been abducted by rebel nobles in the so-called Ruthven Raid. He subsequently escaped, but the escapade meant that no notice was taken of the Church’s complaints.

In 1584 a plague struck Perth and as there was no minister there, Howison went "ministering to the great comfort of the sufferers". The King agreed he could stay there so long as he arranged for another minister for Cambuslang. He again started organising opposition to the bishops while at Perth, and he was again put in prison, this time in the Spey Tower of St Johnstone. Again, it did not last long, nor did it seem to harm his career, as he is soon after found to be preaching to the King, rebuking him to his face "with good exhortation, telling the truth meet for the purpose" (in his own words). Later he preached at Blackfriars, Edinburgh against a "wicked and godless Council" which tried "to stop the mouths of ministers from teaching of the truth". He declared "We will acknowledge nae princes nor magistrates in teaching of the word; nor be bounden to nae injunction, nor obey nae Acts of Parliaments, nor nae other thing that is repugnant to the word of God." He was careful to say it was not the King he was opposing, but the "wicked, godless and villain Council". Anyway "What can the King get of me but my heid and my bluid? I shall never obey their injunctions!" At Linlithgow in 1585 it was claimed "he maid an odious comparison of His Majesie to Jeroboam and making him inferior to him". He was seized and sent to Falkland Palace where he admitted he had said these words and had added that he had urged others "to do the lyke".

Meanwhile, James, Earl of Arran had declared Howison’s post in Cambuslang illegal and tried to give it to another minister, but was not successful.

=== Marriage and struggles with parishioners ===
Howison married Agnes Coluines in 1586, but we have no record of any children. He is reported to have been appointed minister of Glassford (further up the River Clyde) but he was back in Cambuslang the following year. The oddness of this is what makes some people think this is a misprint (see above). The Assembly appointed him to be one of a party of “visitors” to Nithsdale, to check on church discipline and “plant” sound ministers.

In 1592 the Sheriff of Lanark ordered James Hamilton of Shawton, in Cambuslang, to find £1000 caution that he “would not harm the minister of Cambuslang”, so Howison was still making enemies, this time among his parishioners. Howison later applied for further protection. A complaint was made to the Court of Session in Edinburgh from “John Hamilton of Shawton, Andro Hamilton of Westburn, Robert Lyndsay in Vicarland, John Hamilton in Turnelaw, John and Patrick Duning in Halsyde, and William Mader in Newtoun”. The places named are all in Cambuslang Parish. They were complaining Howison was making up complaints against them, so they had to go to the trouble to find money for cautions. Howison did not turn up to contest the complaint, and the case was suspended.

Sometime after 1592 Howison had the King’s own printers publish the so called “Charter of the Church”. This was supposed to be an Act of Parliament titled “An Act for abolishing the Acts contrar (sic) to the liberties of the Church”. In fact, it was a forgery, or at least a falsification. Howison was charged at the Court of Justiciary for “treasonably causing to be printed a false, adulterate and altered Act of Parliament instead of the true and genuine Act of 1592. He was sentenced to prison, but the General Assembly petitioned the King and he was released on 7 March 1596.

Back in Cambuslang, Howison brought a charge of immorality against James Hamilton of Turnelaw (one of the group who had complained about him to the Court of Session in Edinburgh). This case went all the way to Edinburgh, as a criminal prosecution, with an uncertain outcome. Howison was also taken to court for refusing to call the Banns for a marriage between Andro Yule of Flemington and Janet Armour, a thirteen-year-old girl who had been left a small property by her father, George Armour. Howison had been appointed one of the trustees for the girl and he claimed that Yule and his brother John had “carried off the said Janet” (in March 1602) and forced her mother to agree to a marriage. Howison tried to stop the marriage by appealing to the Lords of Session in Edinburgh, but they dismissed his case, saying it was no business of his. Meanwhile, his own Presbytery had ordered him to proclaim the Banns and when he refused, took him to court in Edinburgh. This time the Lords asked the Presbytery to take no further action.

=== Publications and benefactions ===
The first book we know of is his “Discourse on Conscience” published in Edinburgh in 1600. Howison had thought he had lived “in all good conscience”. He also produced a reply to the great Catholic apologist Cardinal Bellarmine titled “Scripture, the interpreter of Scripture”. The General Assembly agreed to examine this and appointed a panel of ministers, including Andrew Melville to look at it. It seems to have been forgotten in the tumult of the times. Howison also reported to the Assembly that he had endowed “with 90 merks, schoolhouse and yaird besyd the Kirk, under sycht of Mr Howison, he bein’ cairful in instructing the youth of the said parochin, and utheris thairabout in their rudiments in religion and gramer”. It was “erected” by royal authority on 5 April 1603.

In 1610, Howison was again a member of the General Assembly. His wife Agnes died in 1612. There is a bell in the steeple of the current Church dated 1612 with the initials “M I H”. This has been interpreted as Mr Iohn Howison, either because he donated it or because it was donated to him in that year.

In 1613, he gave 1000 merks to the Principal of Glasgow University and the Deacon Convenor of the Crafts (the later Trades House) for the maintenance of a student at the university, who must be a son of a Glasgow burgess (citizen). It is interesting that the document that set up this “Howison’s Bursary” is addressed to “ye Richt Reverend Fader Johnne Archibischop of Glasgow”, so he had obviously resigned himself to, if not accepted, bishops in the kirk. The Earl of Arran had used donated land from Lady Chapel at Cambuslang to set up a hospital (Poor House) in Hamilton. In 1615, Howison gave it a further 2000 merks - from the same source - for the support of two old men from Cambuslang.

In 1617, Howison met King James at Paisley. The King was making a royal visit from England whose king he had become in 1603 and where he had lived since then. At Paisley, Howison roundly scolded the King for his practices and intentions. In 1618 Howison died. We do not know where his grave is. He left his books, etc to Glasgow University.

== Sources ==
- Porter, Wm Henry 'Cambuslang and its Ministers' (in Mitchell Library - Glasgow Collection, reference GC941.433 CAM 188520 Box 952
- Scott, Hew Fasti Ecclesiae Scoticanae V4: The Succession of Ministers in the Church of Scotland from the Reformation Edinburgh 1922
- Wilson, James Alexander OBE, MD A History of Cambuslang: a Clydesdale parish. Jackson Wylie & Co Glasgow (1929)
- Howison's Bursary Document. 1850.
