= Gilbertfield Castle =

Castle in South Lanarkshire, Scotland

Coordinates: 55.77671°N 4.14909°W

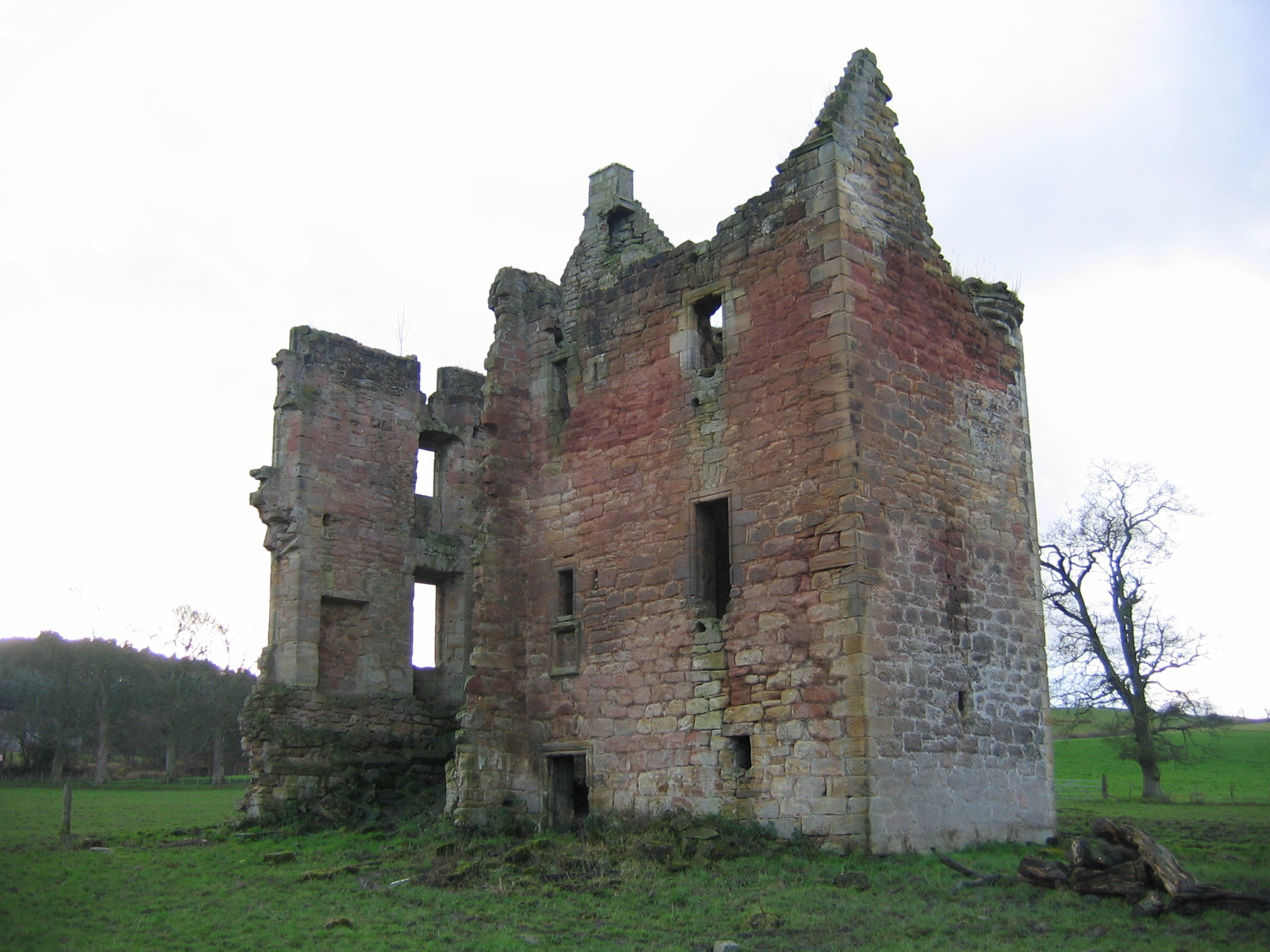
Gilbertfield Castle, seen from the north-east.

Gilbertfield Castle is a ruined 17th-century castle in South Lanarkshire, Scotland. It is located at NS652587, on the north slope of Dechmont Hill, just outside Cambuslang, to the south-east of Glasgow.

== History ==
The castle is within the former barony of Drumsagard, which was a possession of the Hamiltons. The castle was built in the early 17th century, and the date 1607 is displayed on a heraldic panel above the door. The castle was later lived in, around the turn of the 18th century, by William Hamilton of Gilbertfield (1665–1751), a retired soldier and writer. A friend of Allan Ramsay, he was responsible for translating Blind Harry's epic poem The Actes and Deidis of the Illustre and Vallyeant Campioun Schir William Wallace.

== The castle ==
Gilbertfield is a well-planned L-plan tower house. The stair tower, which projects to the north, was large enough to accommodate a series of rooms as well as a square turnpike stair.

The basement level was vaulted, and contained cellars and a kitchen, which had a large fireplace and oven. A service stair connected the basement with the hall above. The hall itself had a smaller fireplace, as well as large windows with gunloops in between. Above the hall were two further floors, each with three rooms; two in the main block, and one in the wing. At the highest level, the garret, two round turrets projected at the south-east and north-west corners. There was no parapet.

The castle is now a neglected ruin, the east wall having collapsed in the 1950s. Only the corbelling of the north-west turret remains.which fell down in the late 1960s. It is now deemed extremely dangerous as a lot of the brick work has fallen each year. The turret fell in the 1970s. Gilbertfield Castle is a Scheduled Ancient Monument.

== Nearby development ==
In March 2017, an application by Persimmon Homes to build over 400 houses in land immediately to the north of Gilbertfield Castle was approved by South Lanarkshire Council's planning committee; this was somewhat controversial as the land had previously been designated Green belt. Various concerns were raised by local residents, community councillors (representing Halfway/Cambuslang East district), the Lowland Reserve Forces and Cadets Association who have a rifle range adjacent to the site, and Clare Haughey and James Kelly, MSPs for the area, which were presented to the committee along with a 1300-signature petition opposing the development, without success. Revisions had already been made to the plans after the Scottish Environment Protection Agency objected to the builder's initial submission in 2016.

A proposal for a further development directly incorporating the castle was publicised in May 2020.
