= Drumsagard Castle =

Castle in South Lanarkshire, Scotland, UK

- Cambuslang, South Lanarkshire, Scotland

Site information
- Condition: Ruined

Location
- Location in South Lanarkshire, Scotland
- Location within South Lanarkshire
- Coordinates: 55.8124°N 4.1302°W

Site history
- Built: c. 14th century
- Materials

Drumsagard Castle, near Cambuslang, South Lanarkshire, Scotland, was a motte and bailey castle which was then built of stone. The castle was the caput of the barony of Drumsagard. Drumsagard was held in the 13th century by the Oliphant family, before it passed by marriage to the de Moravia family. It passed to the Douglas family in 1362 by the marriage of Archibald Douglas, Earl of Douglas to Johanna, daughter of Thomas Moray of Bothwell. The Hamilton family were granted the lands in 1452.

Drumsagard was ruinous by 1796, and the stone used to build the nearby Hallside Farms. An eponymous housing development now surrounds the site of the castle.

== Bibliography ==
- Coventry, Martin. (2008) Castles of the Clans: the strongholds and seats of 750 Scottish families and clans. Musselburgh.
