= Cambuslang Work =

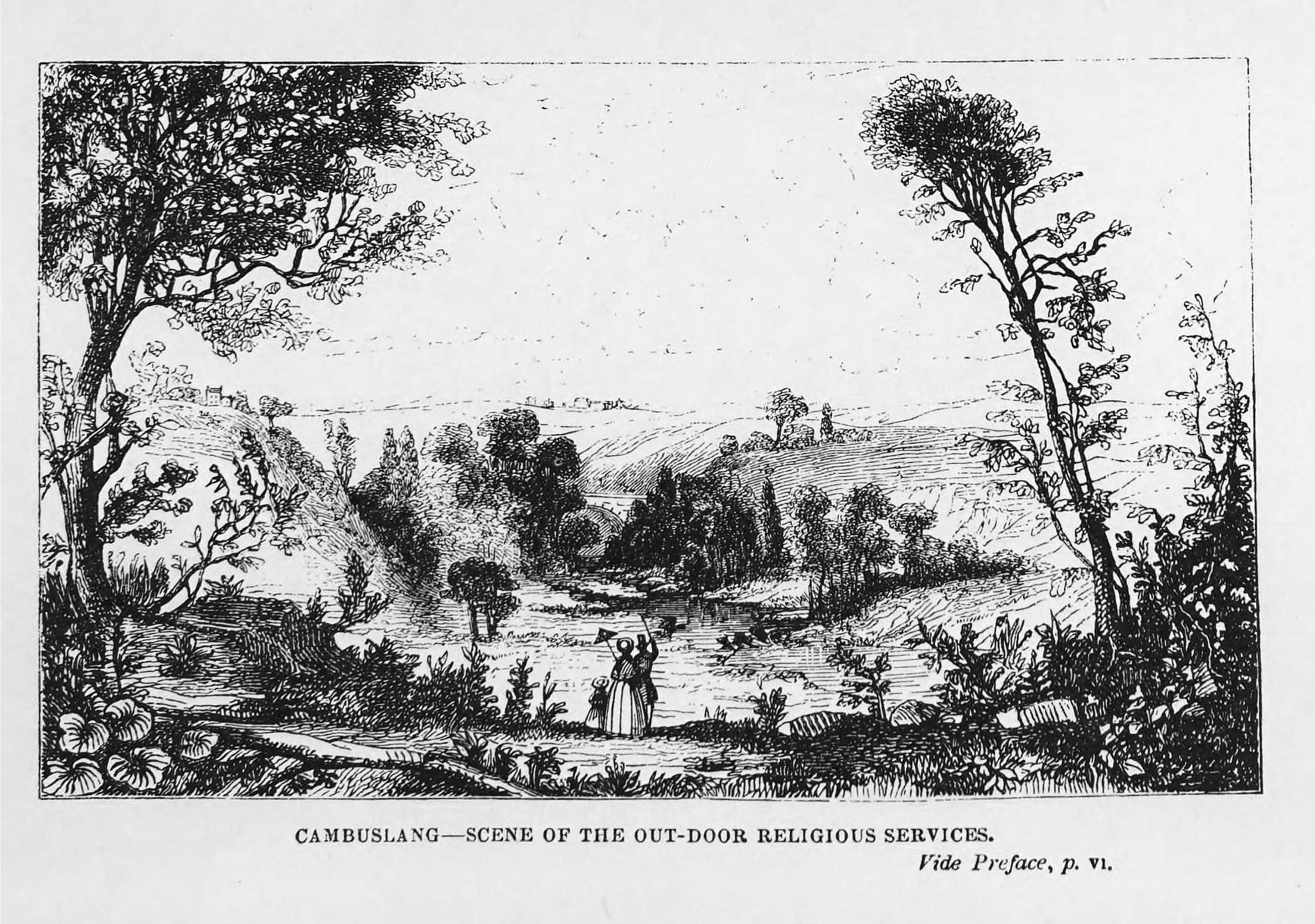
Illustration of Cambuslang Wark

The Cambuslang Work (or Wark in the Scots language; February to November 1742) was a period of extraordinary religious activity, in Cambuslang, Scotland. The event peaked in August 1742 when a crowd of some 30,000 gathered in the 'preaching braes' – a natural amphitheatre next to the Kirk at Cambuslang – to hear the great preacher George Whitefield call them to repentance and conversion to Christ. It was intimately connected with the similar remarkable revivalist events taking place throughout Great Britain and its American Colonies in New England, where it is known as The First Great Awakening.

== A Holy Fair ==
William M'Culloch, the minister of Cambuslang, was an unlikely person to have organised this remarkable event. Early on in his career as a Minister, he had confessed to a friend that he envied those who had felt called or converted to Christ. To him these feelings were completely alien. In addition, although he was an extremely learned and studious person, and a conscientious pastor to his congregation, he was no great preacher. It was said that the ale houses filled up when it was his turn to preach outdoors in traditional Scottish "Sacramental Occasions" or "Holy Fairs", as they were called. This was when ministers and congregations of neighbouring parishes came together for several days of fasting, preaching and self-examination before receiving Holy Communion. One of these events is vividly, and humorously, described in one of Robert Burns' poems, appropriately called "The Holy Fair". It may be that the outdoor preaching of the First Great Awakening in New England had their origins in these Scots emigrant memories of these Holy Fairs.

== New England preachers ==
However, M'Culloch was keenly interested in Calvinist theology of conversion and followed closely the work of the great preachers and their effects in Britain and British North America. His son had for some time been a trader in the colonies, but besides that, the West of Scotland had very close contact with them, as Glasgow merchant ships had several weeks' advantage over other ships in the transatlantic trade. He received many letters from there describing the Great Awakening which he read out (instead of sermons) to his congregation. He also read out copies of sermons collected from there and printed by John Erskine the famous Evangelical. In 1741, the great Methodist preacher George Whitefield came to Scotland, partly to raise money for his orphanage in Georgia. His stops included Leith and Glasgow. This was attended by several of M'Culloch's congregation, who belonged to local prayer and discussion groups called Fellowships. They were much affected by what they heard and saw. On their return to Cambuslang they sought some spiritual help from their minister, M'Culloch.

According to his successor, Dr Meek, M'Culloch had been in the habit of preaching out of doors, in the nearby gorge (today part of Cambuslang Park, where a modern cairn marks the approximate site of the preachings), because of the poor repair of the church. It was here, after sermon, that he shared the letters and written sermons he received from New England. Towards the end of January 1742, two men, Ingram More, a shoemaker, and Robert Bowman, a weaver, went through the parish, and got about 90 heads of families to sign a petition to the minister, asking that he give them a weekly lecture. Thursday evening was set for this. The first two lectures passed off as expected, and only a few persons came back to the manse for further prayer and discussion. However, on Monday 15 February, all the Fellowships in the parish turned up at the manse and spent several days praying and discussing and wondering about the great events that were being reported from England and America.

== Strange behaviour ==
On Thursday 18 February, the weekly lecture proceeded as usual, though it was noticed that the congregation were paying particular attention to the detail of the sermon. However, when the minister finished his last prayer by asking "Lord who hath believed our report; and to whom is the arm of the Lord revealed? where are the fruits of my poor labours among this people" several people cried out publicly in response – an event rare in Scottish worship. Afterwards, some 50 people came back in anguish to the manse, expressing a strong conviction of sin and fearing dreadful punishment in the next life. Then began so great an influx of people to Cambuslang that the minister started giving daily sermons and instruction. This lasted for about seven or eight months, until the coming of autumn. Many who attended the sermons were seized with a strong conviction that they were sinners and experienced an horrific sense of future punishment, many "bewailing their lost and undone condition by nature; calling themselves enemies to God, and despisers of precious Christ; declaring that they were unworthy to live on the face of the earth; that they saw the mouth of hell open to receive them, and that they heard the shrieks of the damned". The most insistent cry was "what shall we do to be saved?" Some beat their breasts and trembled. Many were seized with violent contortions, one woman saying afterwards that it was far worse than the pain of childbirth. Others fainted or bled at the nose. It was noted that the minister, and some of the congregation, encouraged people to give vent to their distress. Those who had been affected often went back to the manse and many spent long nights there in prayer and admonition. They returned to sermon the next day, often bandaged, and sat weeping and moaning in the front row of the congregation, or outside the entrance to the tents. This part of the process – of becoming aware of their sinfulness – was known as "conviction" and many were convicted. Not all, however, went on to the next stage, that is "conversion". Several were converted, though, and often quite suddenly. They were "raised all at once from the lowest depth of sorrow and distress, to the highest pitch of joy and happiness, crying out with triumph and exultation…that they had overcome the wicked one; that they had gotten hold of Christ!" They often followed this with a joyous appeal to the congregation to pray or sing along with them.

== The two communions ==
Many people came from other parts of Scotland, and even from England and Ireland, to hear the sermons, and no doubt to witness the convictions and conversions. M'Culloch needed help and many of the most prestigious Evangelical ministers preached in Cambuslang – in particular Alexander Webster, of Edinburgh, who conducted one of the first Statistical Accounts of Scotland and Robe of Kilsyth, where similar events took place.

Holy Communion was distributed on 11 July and 15 August, when extra tents needed to be erected to accommodate the multitude. George Whitefield, who had experience with crowds, reckoned there were about 30,000 at the latter. (He was surprised, when he announced his text, to hear the rustle of Bibles being leafed through to follow him – an indication of the high rate of literacy among common Scots of the time.)

Four ministers preached on the Friday fast day before the sacrament, four others preached on the Saturday to prepare those taking Communion and probably 15 preached in total on the Sunday of the Communion. James Meek reckons about 3000 took communion, about 10% of the crowd. Another, more evangelical minister calculated that, in total, about 400 persons were converted during the six months of the Cambuslang work, though he also noted "backsliders". The crowds seemed to dwindle after the second communion, no doubt partly due to the year progressing. For some years, however, 18 February was kept, according to M'Culloch "partly as a day of thanksgiving for the remarkable season of grace to many in the British colonies, and particularly for this small corner, in the years 1741 and 1742; and partly as a day of humiliation and fasting for misimprovement (sic) of mercies; and especially for the backslidings of many, who then showed a more than ordinary concern about their souls, but have since fallen away, and turned as bad, or worse than they were before". It is not known if M'Culloch finally experienced either conviction or conversion. There was a centenary event in 1842.

== Explanations ==
Like a good Enlightened scholar, Dr Meek set out three explanations for the events of the Cambuslang Work. He did not mention modern explanations – the distress of tailors and shoemakers following the bad harvests of 1741, the tradition of Holy Fairs, the growing interest in Calvinist theology among many people, especially weavers (who read at their looms), including the country wide interest in what was happening in New England. Instead, he argues that this striking event was either natural or supernatural. If it had been natural (and he seems to suspect it was) he thinks it was caused by "sympathy and example" or what would be known today as "mass hysteria". If it had been supernatural, it either came from God or from the devil. The ministers in the Church of Scotland who belonged to the Evangelical Party – like those who had preached at Cambuslang – were convinced it was a "glorious work of God". However, many of similar Calvinist views had recently left what they thought of as an "ungodly" church and had set up a rival Associate Presbytery. They were convinced that God could not have operated so spectacularly in the Church they had just left, and condemned the Cambuslang Work as "the delusions of Satan, attending the present awful work upon the bodies of men, going on at Cambuslang". A fierce and intemperate pamphlet war ensued – though the writers always professed a Christian concern for the truth and the well-being of men's souls. The controversy still rages today, and remarkably similar general positions are still taken, depending on religious convictions, or indeed the lack of them. The Cambuslang Work was a remarkable historical event and one which is peculiarly well, and in great detail, documented.

== Bibliography ==
- Fawcett, Arthur. Cambuslang revival: the Scottish Evangelical revival of the eighteenth century. 1971.
- Porter, Wm Henry Cambuslang and its Ministers (in Mitchell Library – Glasgow Collection, reference GC941.433 CAM 188520 Box 952)
- MacFarlan, Duncan The revivals of the eighteenth century, particularly at Cambuslang, with three sermons by George Whitefield; compiled from original manuscripts and contemporary publications by D. MacFarlan General Assembly of the Free Church of Scotland, (Edinburgh, 1847)
