= William Patrick (minister) =

Former minister of the Church of Scotland

The Reverend William Patrick (1791–1872) was a 19th-century minister of the Church of Scotland and a significant contributor to the Second, or New, Statistical Account of Scotland. He seems to have been the prime author of the Parish accounts for Hamilton, Blantyre, Bothwell and Cambuslang. In each of these, his interest in the local flora and fauna, especially those that could be hunted, shines through. He had earlier (1831) produced A popular description of the indigenous plants of Lanarkshire.

== Bibliography ==
- New Statistical Account of Scotland Vol VI (1845)
- Patrick, Rev William A popular description of the indigenous plants of Lanarkshire, with an introduction to botany, and a glossary of botanical terms. Edinburgh 1831 (in The British Library, System number 002793299)
