= James Meek (minister) =

James Meek FRSE (1742–1810) (or Meik) was Minister of Cambuslang from 1774 until his death. He was Moderator of the General Assembly of the Church of Scotland in 1795, but is most remembered as the model Enlightenment cleric who wrote the entry for Cambuslang in the First Statistical Account of Scotland.

== Biography ==
Meek's gravestone, Cambuslang Old Parish Kirkyard

James Meek was born the son of John Meek and Janet Millar of Fortissat House in Shotts. He was baptized in Shotts Parish Church on 21 March 1740, according to the Parish records, two years after a brother John. His family were minor landowners, or lairds who had held land in the area since at least the 17th century. Several of his ancestors had been cautioned, imprisoned and bonded, and finally had their land confiscated for Covenanting activity during the reign of King James VII. There is a so-called Covenanters Stone still at Fortissat, and the Mains Farm still exists, as does Fortissat House. The family lands were restored with the so-called Glorious Revolution, when William of Orange invaded England and drove King James VII from is throne. Meek's coat-of-arms incorporated the family motto Jungor ut implear ("I am joined that I may be complete", or "Unity is Strength") and all the heraldric colours and elements of the family - crescents, duck proper and boar's head. James Meek later experienced great difficulties at the hands of Parishioners who saw themselves as the heirs of the Covenanters and him as their enemy. His brother William inherited the estates and James carried on a family tradition of going into the Church.

Meek completed his education for the ministry of the Church of Scotland at Glasgow University at a time when many of the great Scottish Enlightenment figures were teaching there, or had recently retired, notably Adam Smith. His intellectual abilities were recognised early, and he served as preacher in the College Chapel from 1763 until 1765. Edmund Burke was Lord Rector of the University at that time. Thomas Reid the great Common Sense philosopher had recently taken over from Adam Smith. On 25 September 1766, Meek was ordained "Minister of Second Charge" (that is, assistant minister) in Lesmahagow, where his preaching also attracted notice.

In 1805 he was elected a Fellow of the Royal Society of Edinburgh. His proposers were James Finlayson, Hamilton and John Playfair.

Meek died at Cambuslang manse on 21 June 1810 and was succeeded by his assistant, John Robertson.

== Family ==
He married Grizel (Girsy) Weir (1745-1815) of Lesmahagow on 7 February 1770 in the Parish Church there, and had two sons (John, who died at 19, and Thomas, a lawyer in Glasgow, who died at 41) and two daughters (Elizabeth, who married a lawyer, James Davidson, and who died aged 25, and Frances, later Stuart, who died at 88 in 1867).

== Disputed calling to Cambuslang ==
In 1772, Commissioners of Douglas, 8th Duke of Hamilton presented him to the living of the ancient parish of Cambuslang. This was an act of Patronage, dating from an Act of Parliament from Queen Anne's reign (1712). It is said that only about a dozen parishioners agreed to sign the formal call to the parish, while others lodged objections on theological grounds. These were set out in a pamphlet and later laid before the Presbytery of Hamilton. The objectors were local farmers, coal miners and weavers and show the lingering influence of the 'Cambuslang Work'. In particular, they objected that Meek seemed not to accept that faith alone made one worthy in the face of God or that Man was utterly depraved. Worse, he gave too much weight to reason and suggested that men cooperated with God in their own salvation. Alleged quotes from Meek's sermons were put forward as proof of his heresy. Meek denied all of this, so began a long process through the Courts of the Church.

The charges were

- That Mr Meek, when lecturing in his own church on the parable of the labourers, said—"We may see from what has been said that our sincerity is the ground of our acceptance with God."
- When preaching at Cambuslang in May, 1772, from John iii. 16, …Mr Meek "not only neglected to represent that the guilt of Adam's first sin was imputed to his posterity... but on the contrary taught that we have corrupt natures only by imitation and example."
- That Mr Meek, when about to dispense the sacrament of the Lord's Supper in his own church at Lesmahagow, in the year 1773, invited the people in Christ's name to come to the Lord's table, "however enormous their crimes had been, if they resolved to do better".
- ...on another sacramental occasion at Hamilton, in 1772, he said that "our faith and sincerity or sincere endeavours cooperate with the righteousness of Christ."
- Again, on the last mentioned occasion, viz., at Hamilton, he is said to have declared " that when faith goes above and beyond reason it becomes credulity."

In 1774, the General Assembly ordered the Presbytery of Hamilton to proceed with Meek's induction. Accordingly, Mr Park, of Old Monkland, served the edict upon the congregation, and summoned them to state what objections they might have to the life and doctrine of the presentee, at a meeting of the Presbytery to be held in the Manse of Cambuslang on 1 September 1774.

The objectors asked the Presbytery "to find that Mr Meek was unworthy of the character of a minister, therefore to depose or lay him aside from preaching; at least, to find that he cannot be settled in Cambuslang, etc., etc." Many of the ministers in the Presbytery knew Meek and his work, so it dismissed these objections, and even threatened the objectors. They declared some of the objections frivolous and unworthy of notice, others absurd and unintelligible; and all of them irrelevant, and that not a single habile (that is, competent) witness was offered for the proof of them.

An appeal was lodged with the Synod of Glasgow and Ayr. This, on the 12th of October, ordered the Presbytery to investigate the objections thoroughly, which it did by means of a committee. It restated its earlier findings (that the objections were groundless) and issued a lesser form of excommunication on some of the objectors. The objectors appealed again to the Synod, which, in October 1774, overturned the judgement of the Presbytery. It was then referred to the following year's General Assembly. Mr Meek had been invited to preach to the Lord High Commissioner, the King's emissary to the Assembly - an indication of the high esteem in which Mr Meek continued to be held. He preached from Luke xxiv. 26, and in his sermon repeated some of the doctrines which the objectors had raised. The Assembly considered the case on 31 May 1775. During the debate, Meek had some heavyweight support, including that of a previous Moderator of the General Assembly, namely the famous historian Principal Robertson, whose nephew John Robertson was to become Meek's assistant and successor. Its judgement was "The General Assembly having reasoned on this affair, did, and hereby do dismiss the process... and sustain Mr James Meek, minister of Cambuslang." This ended the formal objections to Meek becoming minister at Cambuslang.

== Academic career ==
Meek served as Dean of the Faculties at the University of Glasgow in 1780–82; 1784–86 (when Edmund Burke was Rector); 1788–90;1792–94 and 1798–1800. In 1781, the University bestowed on him the degree of Doctor of Divinity.

== Statistical Account of Scotland 1791 ==
The extensive entry for Cambuslang in the First Statistical Account of Scotland shows "Dr Meek" to have been a man of wide interests and a meticulous scholar with "reasonable" opinions in religion. He consulted many Parish documents and talked to many parishioners before submitting his report to John Sinclair on the state of Cambuslang in the 1790s. He gives a very extensive and detailed comparison between life in the Parish in 1750 and improved circumstances of 1791. He gives precise prices of commodities and clear descriptions of the farming and industrial methods used. He was familiar with ecclesiastical history and had read recently published works on local early history. His account of the great revival meetings in Cambuslang in the 1720s draws upon local and documentary (pamphlets, etc.) evidence. He is not convinced that the enthusiastic conversions reported were genuine manifestations of the supernatural, though he balances the arguments on both sides. He is familiar with the geological formation of the area and gives an account of it in the scientific parlance of the day. Where appropriate he gives precise measurements for areas, land values, prices, breadth and depth of the river, etc. He gives meteorological measurements taken (presumably by him, or under his instruction) twice a day at the manse for seven years and reports them with averages and maxima and minima. (His measurements were quoted throughout the 19th century, for example in the six-volume The Gallery of Nature, London 1821, and the 26-volume The London Encyclopaedia London, 1839. The data were also used for 20th century histories of weather, such as Historic Storms of the North Sea, British Isles and Northwest Europe, H. H. Lamb & Knud Frydendahl, CUP 1991. He complained about the state of repair of the church and manse, but is proud of the parish school and the treatment of the poor. He is moved by the unparalleled view of the Clyde valley, Bothwell Castle and well-tended counties from a nearby hill, and especially the view of Glasgow, including its cathedral, College and church spires.

== Journal and register of the weather ==
Meek's manuscript volume of Journal and register of the weather, kept at Cambuslang 1st Jan. 1785 to 30 April 1809, bound in leather, is a detailed record of daily notes taken by Meek of barometer and thermometer readings, wind direction, rainfall and remarks about the weather and the conditions for farming. At the end of each month and year there are tabulated summaries and general remarks on weather in different parts of the country and world, notes of unusual conditions and the effects on crops, harvests, markets, etc. His first remark, for Saturday 1 January 1785 was "Cloudy with some slight showers of snow". His first month summary, January 1785, for example, noted "Fair days 12- rainy or snowy days 19. A pretty good weather month. Not much high wind. Some snow but little rain. Thow was very little ploughed after harvest, & thow have been only 10 or 12 days this month, on which ploughs could go. The rate of the markets of Glasgow - best wheat 19 shil per bol. Best of oatmeal 13 pence per peck, peasemeal 9½ per peck." He later noted the particularly cold weather - there was skating on the Rhone at Avignon in the south of France. June, though, was very different. "A remarkably warm and pleasant month. In this climate, nobody remembers so many extraordinary warm days in succession. The heat both during the day and night time there was to many almost insupportable.". Meek produced these tables and summaries for almost 24 years, until the year before his death. Until 1792, he took readings three times a day, at 8am, 10am and 8pm. After 1792, he only took one reading at 10am. The Journal continues for 388 pages until 30 April 1809. His summary of that month is short "Dry days 18 - Wet and windy do. 12". He died the following year. This detailed and scholarly document is still consulted and quoted by modern climate historians search for evidence of climate change.

Extracts from Meek's observations were quoted in the Sixth (1823) Edition of Encyclopædia Britannica Vol 13 Ch IV Article on "Meteorology" Page 723.

== Moderator ==
He became Moderator of the General Assembly of the Church of Scotland on 21 May 1795, where he tended to favour the Moderates over the Evangelicals. The General Assembly of the Church of Scotland met in Edinburgh on 21 May 1795. One of its first tasks was to elect a moderator, or chairman. There was only one candidate, Meek, and he was elected unanimously. The Assembly met for nine sessions, ending on Monday 1 June 1795, with a sermon and prayer by Meek. The minutes of these sessions take up 100 pages of closely written manuscript. (GUL Reference GB 0247 MS Gen 1159). The Assembly humbly received King George III’s Commission, which was in Latin, and replied to it loyally and fulsomely. It also received the king’s news that his son, Prince George (later, the Prince Regent) was to be married to Princess Caroline of Brunswick. They decided not only to debate this and congratulate the King, but also to send extensive congratulations to the Prince. Most business related to receiving reports from, or setting up committees. One item much debated was the "Religious Education of Youth". It also examined in detail the "probationers" - or trainee ministers - in place throughout the country.
As a court of the church, it dealt with disputes between parishes and ministers - the Orkney Grievances was a major issue that year - and various other matters of public morality. One issue, which a previous General Assembly had referred to the Crown Lawyers related to whether the Barbers and Hairdressers of Edinburgh had profaned the Sabbath. Apparently, not technically, or at least, legally, but the Presbytery of Edinburgh was urged to use all persuasive means at its disposal to encourage respect for the Sabbath.

== Meek's library ==
Meek's library, now in the National Library of Scotland, show that he was keenly interested in the improvements in roads, canals, etc., taking place all over Britain at the time.

Documents owned by Meek include:

- Act and recommendation of the General Assembly of the Church of Scotland, appointing a general collection for completing the bridge over the river North-Esk near Montrose. : At Edinburgh, 25 May 1773. (With Meek's armorial bookplate; Previously owned by George Wishart)
- Bill for enlarging the term and powers granted by an Act of the twenty-sixth year of the reign of his late Majesty King George the Second, intitled, An act for repairing the roads from Livingston by the Kirk of Shotts to the city of Glasgow, and by the town of Hamilton to the town of Strathaven, and for making the said act more effectual; also for repairing several other roads in the county of Lanark, not mentioned in the said former Act..(With Meek's armorial bookplate)
- James Boswell and Robert Hope Case of Robert Hope, tenant to the Right Honourable James Montgomery, Esq; of Stanhope, at Minzons, Appellant, from a sentence of the Synod of Lothian and Tweedale, affirming a previous sentence against him by the Presbytery of Peebles..(With Meek's armorial bookplate)

In the Special Collections section of the Library of Glasgow University, there is an extensive, bound manuscript of An abstract of the proceedings of the General Assemblies of the Church of Scotland, from 1560 to approximately the 1630s. (GUL Reference GB 0247 MS Gen 1132). The title page of the manuscript bears the name of Sir William Dunlop, 1699.

Inside is a letter from Dr Meek, which, by order of the Senate of the University in 1792, was to be “securely” bound to the manuscript. The letter was to Professor George Jardine, dated 20 December 1791. It provides some information about the manuscript's likely origins. Meek thanks "the Faculty" for allowing him to see the manuscript and states that

"About the year 1699, Mr William Dunlop Principal of the University of Glasgow, got this work transcribed from a copy that seems to have belonged to the General Assembly, which copy was lost, or more probably burnt about two years after... by a fire, 28 Oct[obe]r 1701, in the house of Mr Nicol Spense sub-clerk to the Assembly. This circumstance renders your M.S. more valuable; for notwithstanding its imperfections it ought now perhaps to be considered, as the most authentic Register of the proceedings of the Kirk of Scotland for almost 60 years after the Reformation."

Meek then reports that he has compared the document with the manuscript of David Calderwood's History of the Kirk of Scotland (completed about 1650). Meek is amazed at the "blanks" and "mistakes" and proceeds to list his very extensive corrections in his characteristic small, clear handwriting. In fact it is an extensive corrigendum to this important manuscript, presumably why the University authorities were anxious that it was "securely" bound with the original document. Meek considered that, in general, the language of this manuscript was clearer than that of Calderwood and so, with his corrections, would be a better reference point for settling legal or historical matters. It shows once again Meek as a careful, painstaking scholar, for the work must have involved several months of careful collation.

== See also ==
- List of moderators of the General Assembly of the Church of Scotland

Church of Scotland titles
Preceded by Robert Arnot	Moderator of the General Assembly of the Church of Scotland; 1795	Succeeded by William Greenfield
