= West Coats Primary School =

Primary school in South Lanarkshire, Scotland

Coordinates: 55.81556°N 4.175534°W

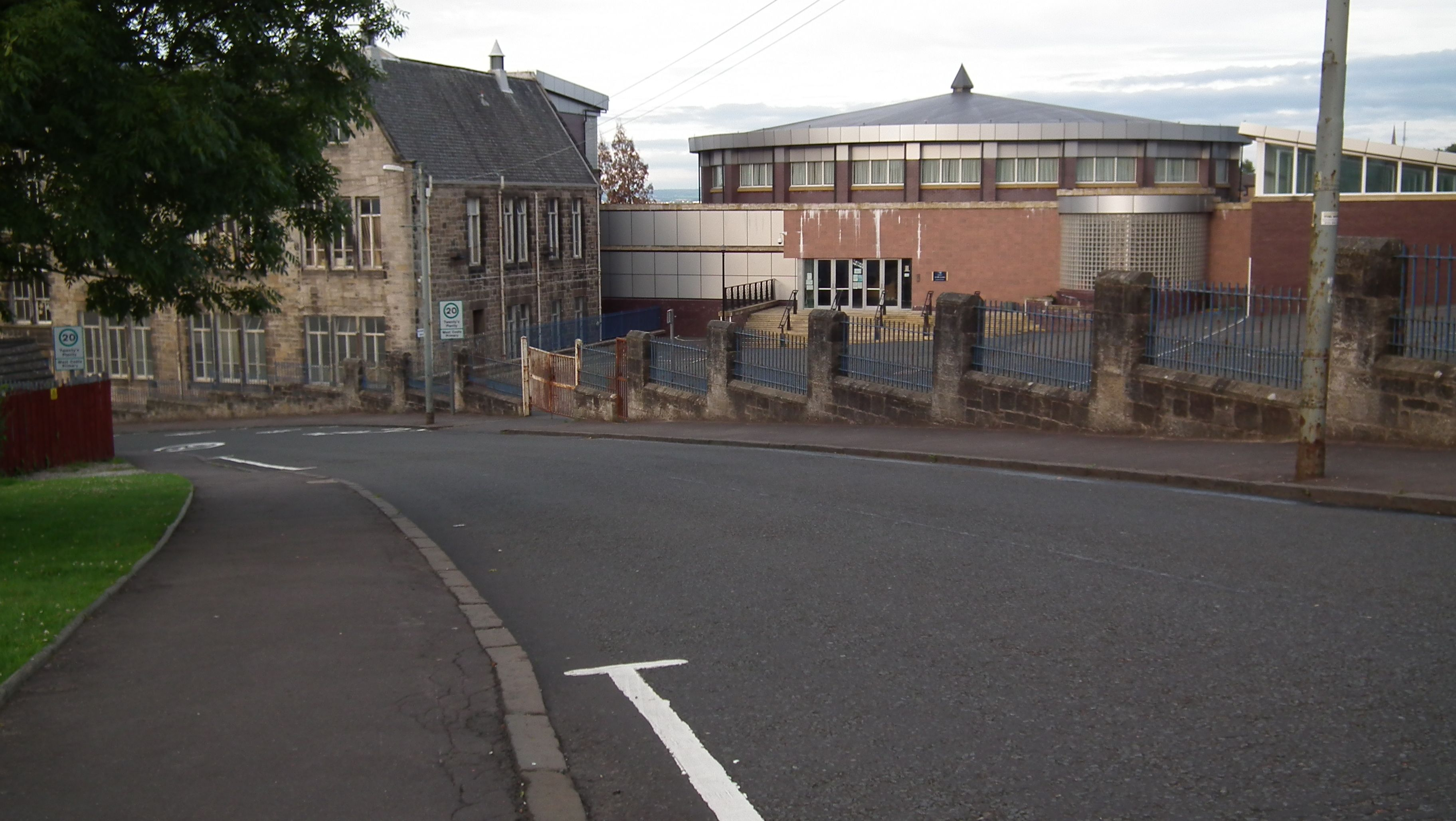
2012 image showing original building and modern extension

West Coats Primary School is a listed building at 60 Brownside Road in Cambuslang on the south east fringe of Glasgow, Scotland. It was built in the late 19th century and is still an active school with over 400 children. It has been extended to accommodate the increasing number of pupils.

The school has several classrooms, a gym/dining hall and a Computer Suite. P6 and P7 performed with Scottish Opera at a performance in February 2006.

In the early 21st century, West Coats demand for places far outstrips capacity - even with the new extension erected in the upper playground (the erstwhile boys' playground) in the early 2000s.

Due to the age of the buildings and the demand for places - which worsened as a large amount of new houses for young families were built in the surrounding area such as at Greenlees, while the school itself continued to receive very good ratings in inspections - the campus was extended in 2003 and refurbished in 2015–16. During the latter process, the pupils had to attend a decant facility at the former Cairns Primary School (which had itself already been rebuilt on an adjacent site) in the Halfway district of Cambuslang.

As well as central Cambuslang south of the Main Street, the catchment zone for West Coats includes the Kirkhill and Holmhills (the northern part of Whitlawburn) areas.

== History ==
The original stone buildings have been B-listed since 1993. When first constructed, West Coats Road did not extend south past Brownside Road, but contemporaneous with a southern extension of West Coats Road the three-storey extension was added on that side of the school; it is portrayed on the 1910 map of the area but not the 1896 version. Similarly, the railway line (Glasgow to Newton) in a deep cutting that bounds the school site to the south did not appear until that map edition.

Originally West Coats was a Higher Grade (or HG) school that pupils attended from age five to fourteen and left for the workplace. Later it became a primary school for children aged between five and eleven, (or twelve, depending on when their birthday fell).

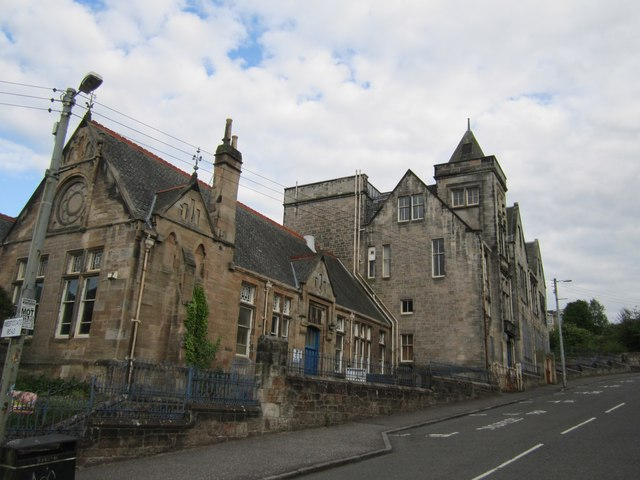
Old buildings of the school (2012, prior to a refurbishment)

At one time West Coats had a smart uniform comprising blazers, white shirts or blouses, ties, grey flannel short trousers or gym-slips, grey themed jumpers with matching knee-length socks, and black shoes. Today’s uniform is rather different.

Eminent former pupils of West Coats include Robert Crawford, current Professor of English at St. Andrew’s University, and the late Duncan Glen, Professor Emeritus of Visual Communication at Nottingham Trent University. Whereas an eminent former head teacher of West Coats was poet John Buchanan, who reigned at the school somewhere around the period 1905–1919. The well-known boxer Scott Harrison went to this school.
