= Halfway, South Lanarkshire =

Coordinates: 55.81238°N 4.146223°W

Halfway: Scots: Haufwey
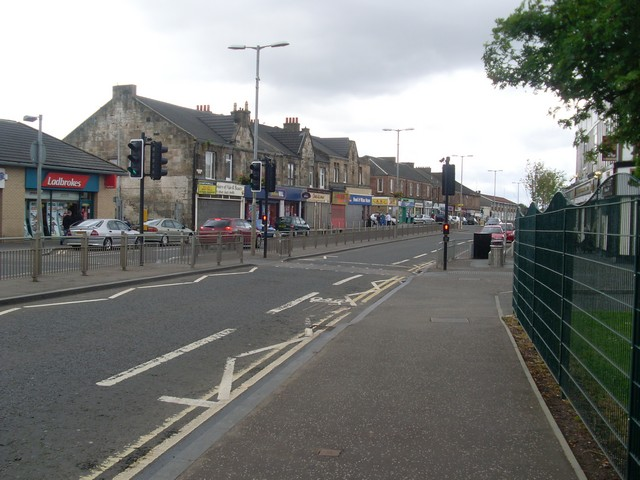
- Main row of shops on Hamilton Road

- Location within South Lanarkshire
- Council area: South Lanarkshire
- Country: Scotland
- Sovereign state: United Kingdom
- Post town: GLASGOW
- Postcode district: G72
- Dialling code: 0141
- Police: Scotland
- Fire: Scottish
- Ambulance: Scottish
- UK Parliament: Rutherglen and Hamilton West
- Scottish Parliament: Rutherglen

Halfway is a largely suburban area in the town of Cambuslang, Scotland, located within the local authority area of South Lanarkshire. It borders the smaller areas of Lightburn, Cairns, Flemington, Drumsagard and Hallside.

Halfway is the largest component of the Cambuslang East ward of South Lanarkshire Council which has an overall population of around 16,000.

== History and amenities ==
The district was named in the days of the Glasgow to Hamilton stagecoach when passengers would stop halfway between the destinations to change the horses, have a rest etc. There is a long history of coal mining in the area (especially around Flemington), but no colliery is still in operation. It also has the older name of Gilbertfield, referring to the nearby ruined 'castle' of that name (as it is known locally - it is, in fact, a stately home) which still stands to the south. It was owned by Hamilton of Gilbertfield. He was a friend of Robert Burns and wrote a poem about William Wallace called Blind Harry's Wallace, a rendering into contemporary English of a medieval Scots poem, which was eventually used as the basis for the screenplay that became the Mel Gibson blockbuster Braveheart.

The area sits to the south of Dechmont Hill, an extinct volcanic rock 300 feet (91 m) above sea level. There is evidence, written by the Welsh chroniclers, that King Arthur's 12th battle, the battle of Calaan, took place there against the two sons of his rival Caw, (or Cawn), king of Strathclyde.

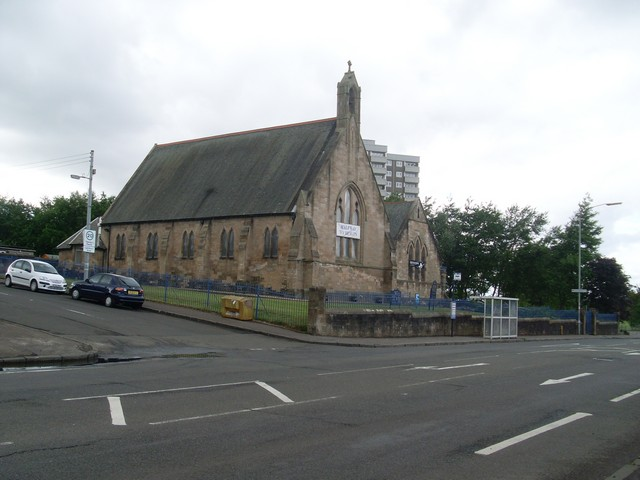
Flemington-Hallside Parish Church

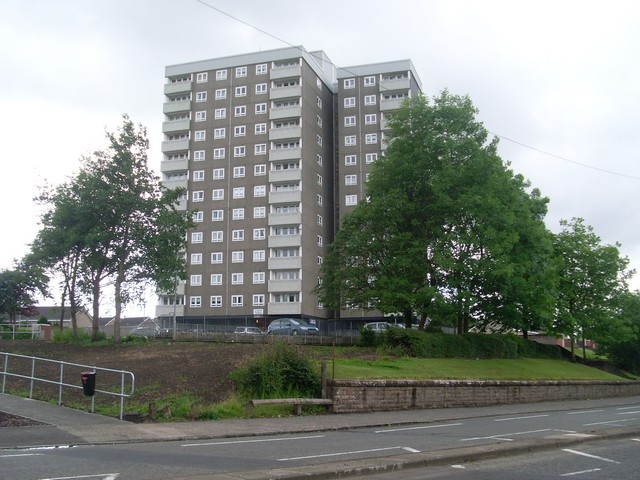
Logan Tower (since refurbished)

Halfway is home to two places of worship, Flemington-Hallside Parish Church (adjacent to the area's single residential tower block, Logan Tower) and St. Cadoc's Roman Catholic Chapel south-west of the main road in the Cairns post-World War II housing estate, named after the now-demolished mansion 'The Cairns'. There is also a lawn bowling club, a fuel filling station, a local park with play area, a public library, a small medical centre and a typical selection of local shops, takeaways and public houses. All these amenities are located either on the main thoroughfare, Hamilton Road (A724), or just off it.

There is no train station in the immediate area, although northern parts of Halfway are within walking distance of Newton railway station. The main road is on a bus route between Glasgow and Lanarkshire (the same route taken by the historic stagecoaches mentioned above).

=== Education ===
Primary schools in the area include St. Cadoc's RC, Cairns (immediately next to St Cadoc's), Hallside and Park View. All were rebuilt in the 2010s, except Park View which only opened in 2014 to alleviate overcrowding at nearby Hallside. After Cairns Primary was re-located on the site of the old mansion a few hundred yards to the west of its original 1950s site, the old buildings were used as a decant facility by other schools in the district while theirs were rebuilt meaning for several years there were three schools on a single suburban street, one with pupils who did not live nearby – it was hoped that the traffic congestion problems frequently experienced by locals would be alleviated once this modernisation process was completed across the region in early 2020, but later that year it was noted that this was still a concern for many parents.

Older children normally go on to Trinity High School, Cathkin High School or Stonelaw High School, depending on which primary school they attended.

A standalone pre-school facility, Lightburn ELC, was built on the site of the miners' welfare club on Mill Road, opening in 2021 (not to be confused with Millburn ELC, its sister facility located in Newton).

=== Gilbertfield ===
In March 2017, an application by Persimmon Homes to build almost 400 houses in land immediately to the north of Gilbertfield Castle was approved by South Lanarkshire Council's planning committee; this was somewhat controversial as the land had previously been designated Green belt. Various concerns were raised by local residents, community councillors (representing Halfway/Cambuslang East ward), the Lowland Reserve Forces and Cadets Association who have a rifle range adjacent to the site, and Clare Haughey and James Kelly, MSPs for the area, which were presented to the committee along with a 1300-signature petition opposing the development, without success. Revisions had already been made to the plans after the Scottish Environment Protection Agency objected to the builder's initial submission in 2016.

A proposal for a further development directly incorporating the castle was publicised in May 2020.

== Notable residents ==
- Charlie Hill, boxer
- Scott Harrison, boxer
- Bernard Ponsonby, TV political news reporter
- Kyle Hutton, footballer
- Mick McGahey, miners' union leader
- Margaret Ferrier, politician
