= Drumsagard Village =

Coordinates: 55.820940°N 4.130430°W

Drumsagard: Scots: Drumsargart
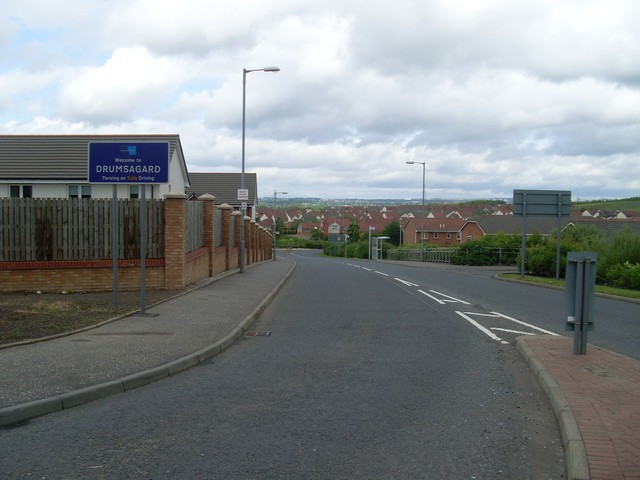
- Looking north into Drumsagard from Hallside Boulevard

- Location within South Lanarkshire
- Council area: South Lanarkshire
- Country: Scotland
- Sovereign state: United Kingdom
- Post town: GLASGOW
- Postcode district: G72 7
- Dialling code: 0141
- Police: Scotland
- Fire: Scottish
- Ambulance: Scottish
- UK Parliament: Rutherglen and Hamilton West
- Scottish Parliament: Rutherglen

Drumsagard Village is a new construction village in Cambuslang, South Lanarkshire. It is built around the site of Drumsagard Castle and immediately south of the site of Hallside Steelworks.

== History ==
The Parish of Cambuslang in the Barony of Drumsargard, also spelt Drumsagart, meaning "ridge of the priest" – can be traced back to the time of King Alexander II of Scotland (1214–49) when it belonged to Walter Olifard, Justiciar of Lothian. The Barony of Drumsargard (whose castle ruins can be discerned to the south-east of Hallside although none of the structure itself now remains) passed to Archibald Douglas, 3rd Earl of Douglas in 1370, as part of the settlement in his marriage to Johanna, daughter of Thomas Moray of Bothwell. In 1452 the Douglases were displaced in favour of James Lord Hamilton, who became tenant-in-chief in 1455. This feudal superiority remained with the Dukes of Hamilton – who were also the largest landowners – up until 1922, though the abolition of feudalism in Scotland did not come until the end of the 20th Century.

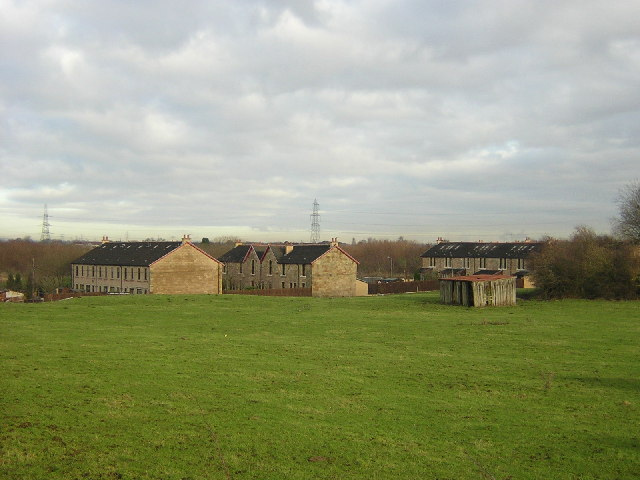
Hallside Village

In the 19th and early 20th century there were several working farms and a small colliery on the land which is now modern housing. Hallside House, the mansion overlooking the area (built by George Jardine), was located off Manse Brae at the eastern side of the parish of Cambuslang, near the boundary with Blantyre; it survived until the 1930s. There was also a small community built for the steel workers and the managers which had associated schools and churches but that has all but disappeared, save for a group of sandstone houses known as Hallside Village which were restored in the late 20th century.

The larger part of the modern suburb was constructed in the late 1990s and early 2000s. In the 2010s, one of the remaining farms (East Hallside) was demolished and converted into a further area of new housing, and in 2021 planning was approved by the council for a further development (184 homes) on the eastern edge of the neighbourhood despite more than 150 complaints being submitted in respect of green belt encroachment and wildlife disruption, lack of sufficient local amenities and access all being off the main A724 road rather than existing side streets.

== Facilities ==
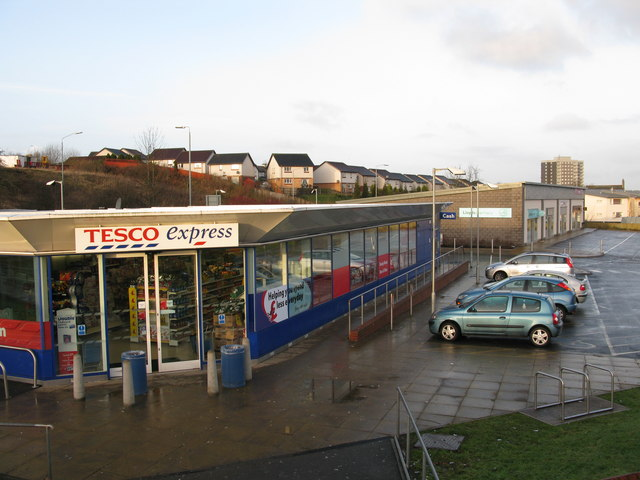
Drumsagard retail zone

Drumsagard is within the Cambuslang East ward of the South Lanarkshire Council area which is also the extent of the neighbourhood community policing zone. There is a small precinct of shops at the southern edge of the development, and the closest area with a wider range of amenities is Halfway.

There are currently two schools in the vicinity of Drumsagard – Hallside Primary, a 21st century incarnation of the previous school of the same name which was mainly attended by children of the steel workers), and Park View Primary, an additional smaller facility to accommodate the number of pupils, mostly from new homes in Drumsagard, which had become too much for Hallside despite several extensions to its capacity. Both of these schools are non-denomonational; the nearest Catholic schools are St Charles' in Newton and St Cadoc's in Halfway.

At the north side of Drumsagard is Newton railway station which links to Glasgow city centre, Cambuslang, Rutherglen and Hamilton. A major bus route at the southern boundary running between Glasgow and Hamilton, First Glasgow's '267', serves the area via Hamilton Road (A724) with stops near to the shops.

After securing a grant from 'Award for All', the residents association funded a feasibility study which resulted in the addition of sporting facilities in the village in 2010. A multi-use games area and sports pitch are part of the sports facilities.

=== Hallside Heritage Park ===
Between Drumsagard and the railway lines at Newton station is 'Hallside Heritage Park', a large expanse of woodland on the site of the Hallside Steelworks, (also known as the Cambuslang Iron and Steel Works, established in 1871 as one of the first facilities of its kind and eventually extending over an area of around 33 acres, closed in 1979) which was cleared and planted in the 1990s by the housebuilding firms to compensate for the green space lost to their developments in the area. With little subsequent investment or attention, the land became somewhat neglected and overgrown and was eventually taken over by the local residents association, with initial plans for improving its facilities and landscape published in 2019.

== See also ==
- Noddy housing
