= List of Scottish scientists =

This is a list of notable scientists born in Scotland or associated with Scotland, as part of the List of Scots series.

| Scientist | Lifespan | Primary field | Note |
|---|---|---|---|
| Thomas Addison | 1793-1860 | physician | nephrology pioneer |
| James Edward Tierney Aitchison | 1836–1898 | botanist | surgeon; collected plants in India and Afghanistan |
| John Aitken | 1839–1919 | meteorologist, physicist and marine engineer | inventor of the koniscope, (also known as the Aitken dust counter) |
| William Aiton | 1731–1793 | botanist | |
| Adam Anderson | 1783–1846 | physicist | contributor to Edinburgh Encyclopædia and Encyclopædia Britannica |
| Alexander Anderson | 158?–162? | mathematician | c. 1582– c. 1620 |
| John Anderson | 1833–1900 | zoologist and anatomist | curator of the Indian Museum |
| Thomas Anderson | 1832–1870 | botanist | director of the Calcutta Botanic Garden |
| William Arthur | 1894–1979 | mathematician | |
| John Logie Baird | 1888–1946 | engineer | television inventor |
| William Baird | 1803–1872 | zoologist | author of The Natural History of the British Entomostraca |
| Thomas Barker | 1838–1907 | mathematician | professor of pure mathematics at Owens College |
| Sir Isaac Bayley Balfour | 1853-1922 | botanist | Sherardian Professor of Botany |
| John Hutton Balfour | 1808–1884 | botanist | |
| John Barclay | 1758–1826 | anatomist | donor of the Barclay Collection at Surgeons' Hall, Edinburgh |
| Robert Barclay | d.1973 | statistician | scholar of Orkney |
| James Bassantin | fl 16th century | astronomer and mathematician | author of Astronomique Discours, Lyon, 1557 |
| Alexander Graham Bell | 1847–1922 | engineer, scientist | telephone inventor |
| Eric Temple Bell | 1883–1960 | mathematician | science fiction writer |
| Robert J. T. Bell | 1876–1963 | mathematician | Professor of Pure and Applied mathematics at the University of Otago |
| James W. Black | 1924–2010 | physician | Nobel Prize for Medicine, 1988 |
| Joseph Black | 1728–1799 | scientist | carbon dioxide discoverer |
| Robert Blair | 1748–1828 | astronomer | inventor of the aplanatic lens |
| John Boyd Orr, 1st Baron Boyd-Orr | 1880–1971 | nutritionist | Nobel Peace Prize winner |
| David Brewster | 1781–1868 | scientist | Royal Scottish Society of Arts founder |
| Thomas Brisbane | 1773–1860 | astronomer | |
| John Campbell Brown | 1947-2019 | astronomer | Investigated Solar physics |
| Robert Brown | 1773–1858 | botanist | Brownian Motion discoverer |
| David Bruce | 1855–1931 | pathologist, microbiologist | |
| Alexander Buchan | 1829–1907 | meteorologist, oceanographer and botanist | established the weather map as the basis of weather forecasting |
| Elaine Bullard | 1915–2011 | self-taught botanist | Official Recorder of Orkney for the Botanical Society of the British Isles for 46 years |
| Malcolm H. Chisholm | 1945-2015 | Organometallic chemist | Contributed to the synthesis and structural chemistry of transition metal complexes |
| Phillip Clancey | 1917–2001 | ornithologist | ornithology pioneer |
| A. Catrina Coleman | born 1956 | physicist: Semiconductor lasers | Professor at the University of Texas at Dallas |
| John Craig | 1663–1731 | mathematician | Newton colleague |
| James Croll | 1821–1890 | scientist | astronomical theory of 19th-century climate change, leading proponent |
| Alexander Crum Brown | 1838–1922 | chemist | organic chemistry |
| William Cullen | 1710–1790 | physician, chemist | |
| David Cuthbertson | 1900–1989 | physician, biochemist, medical researcher, nutritionist | leading authority on metabolism |
| James Dewar | 1842–1923 | physicist | low temperature, vacuum flask inventor |
| George Dickie | 1812–1882 | botanist | specialist in algae |
| Alexander Dickson | 1836–1887 | botanist | morphological botanist |
| David Drysdale | 1877–1946 | mathematician | |
| James Alfred Ewing | 1855–1935 | physicist, engineer | discoverer of hysteresis |
| William Fairbairn | 1789–1874 | engineer | structural |
| Hugh Falconer | 1808–1865 | palaeontologist | |
| James Ferguson | 1710–1776 | astronomer, instrument maker | |
| Sir Alexander Fleming | 1881–1955 | microbiologist | Nobel Prize in Physiology or Medicine, 1945 |
| John Fleming | 1785–1857 | naruralist | person after whom Fleming Fjord is named |
| Williamina Fleming | 1857–1911 | astronomer | cataloguing of stars contributor, discoverer of the Horsehead Nebula |
| John Flett | 1869–1947 | geologist | Director of the Geological Survey of Great Britain |
| James David Forbes | 1809–1868 | physicist, geologist | |
| Professor George Forbes | 1849–1936 | scientist | electrical engineering, hydro-electric power generation |
| Robert Fortune | 1813–1880 | botanist | |
| John Fraser | 1750–1811 | botanist, plant collector | |
| Alexander Garden | 1730–1791 | physician, botanist and zoologist | the botanist after whom the genus Gardenia is named |
| Patrick Geddes | 1854–1932 | biologist | urban theorist |
| Archibald Geikie | 1835–1924 | geologist | the geologist after whom Dorsa Geikie on the moon; Geikie Gorge in Western Australia; Mount Geikie in Tasmania; Mount Geikie in Canada; Mount Geikie in Wyoming; Geikie Peak in Arizona; the Geikie Slide in the Atlantic Ocean; and the mineral Geikielite are named |
| Alexander Gibson | 1800–1867 | botanist | worked on forest conservation in India |
| Sir David Gill | 1843–1914 | astronomer | astrophotography pioneer |
| John Goodsir | 1814–1867 | anatomist | pioneer in the study of the cell |
| Isabella Gordon | 1901–1978 | zoologist | carcinologist |
| Robert Graham | 1786–1845 | botanist | Regius Keeper of the Royal Botanic Garden Edinburgh |
| Thomas Graham | 1805–1869 | chemist | discovered dialysis |
| Robert Edmond Grant | 1793–1874 | biologist | Swiney lecturer in geology to the British Museum |
| Marion Cameron Gray | 1902–1979 | mathematician | discovered Gray graph |
| David Gregory | 1659–1708 | astronomer, mathematician | Savilian Professor of Astronomy |
| Duncan Farquharson Gregory | 1813–1844 | mathematician | also worked in chemistry and physics |
| James Gregory | 1638–1675 | astronomer, mathematician | Gregorian reflecting telescope, first described, Robert Hooke later built |
| James Gregory | 1832–1899 | mineralogist | believed claims of diamond discoveries in South Africa were false |
| William Gregory | 1803–1858 | mineralogist | |
| James Hall | 1761–1832 | geologist | |
| M R Henderson | 1899–1982 | botanist | |
| Thomas Henderson | 1798–1844 | astronomer | Alpha Centauri, first measured distance |
| John Hope | 1725–1786 | botanist | botanist who had genus Hopea named after him |
| Thomas Charles Hope | 1766–1844 | chemist and physician | discoverer of strontium |
| James Hutton | 1726–1797 | geologist | scientific basis of geology established |
| Ninian Imrie of Denmuir | c.1750–1820 | geologist | Provided the first geological description of the Rock of Gibraltar |
| Robert T. A. Innes | 1861–1933 | astronomer | Proxima Centauri discoverer |
| James Ivory | 1765–1842 | mathematician | |
| William Jardine | 1800–1874 | naturalist | |
| George Johnston | 1800–1874 | naturalist | also physician and mayor of Berwick |
| Henry Halcro Johnston | 1856–1939 | botanist | also army surgeon and rugby union international |
| John Keill | 1671–1721 | mathematician and astronomer | disciple and defender of Isaac Newton, Savilian Professor of Astronomy |
| John Kerr | 1824–1907 | physicist | electro-optics pioneer, discovery of Kerr effect |
| Alexander King | 1909–2007 | chemist | co-founder of the Club of Rome and pioneer of sustainable development |
| Norman Boyd Kinnear | 1882–1957 | zoologist | |
| Cargill Gilston Knott | 1856–1922 | physicist and mathematician | pioneer in seismology |
| Johann von Lamont | 1805–1879 | astronomer | Uranus and Saturn moon orbits calculated |
| Arthur Pillans Laurie | 1861–1949 | chemist | pioneered scientific analysis of paint |
| Malcolm Laurie | 1866–1932 | zoologist | specialist in arachnids, especially scorpions |
| John Leslie | 1766–1832 | mathematician, physicist | heat research |
| Joseph Lister, 1st Baron Lister | 1827–1912 | surgeon | Antiseptic surgery introduced, eponymous Listerine |
| William Lochead | c.1753–1815 | botanist | surgeon, curator of the Saint Vincent and the Grenadines Botanic Gardens |
| Sir Charles Lyell, 1st Baronet | 1797–1875 | geologist, lawyer | geology pioneer, (British), foremost of his day |
| John Macadam | 1827–1865 | botanist | (Scottish-born Australian) |
| William McNab | 1844–1889 | botanist | physician |
| William MacGillivray | 1796–1852 | naturalist | |
| Sheila Scott Macintyre | 1910–1960 | mathematician | |
| Colin Maclaurin | 1698–1746 | mathematician | Maclaurin series developer |
| Anna MacGillivray Macleod | 1917–2004 | botanist, biochemist, | professor of brewing |
| John Macleod | 1876–1935 | biochemist, physiologist | Nobel Prize laureate, 1923 |
| John George Macleod | 1915–2006 | physician | author of medical books |
| William Maclure | 1760–1843 | geologist | |
| Sheina Marshall | 1896–1977 | marine biologist | |
| Francis Masson | 1741–180? | botanist | 1741– c. 1805 |
| James Clerk Maxwell | 1831–1879 | scientist | thermodynamics, electromagnetics theorist |
| Anderson Gray McKendrick | 1876–1943 | physician, epidemiologist | pioneer of the use of mathematical methods in epidemiology |
| John Gray McKendrick | 1841–1926 | physiologist | |
| Archibald Menzies | 1754–1852 | botanist, explorer | |
| Philip Miller | 1691–1771 | botanist | |
| Roderick Murchison | 1792–1871 | geologist | Silurian period first described, investigated |
| Alexander Murray | 1810–1884 | geologist | |
| James Napier | 1810–1884 | chemist | antiquarian |
| John Napier | 1550–1617 | mathematician | logarithms |
| Sir Andrew Noble | 1831–1915) | physicist | Ballistics and Gunnery |
| William Robert Ogilvie-Grant | 1863–1924 | ornithologist | |
| Thomas Stewart Patterson | 1872–1949 | organic chemist | stereochemistry |
| James Bell Pettigrew | 1834–1908 | naturalist | Croonian Lecturer; authority on animal locomotion |
| John Playfair | 1748-1819 | Natural philosophy | Playfair's axiom; Playfair's law |
| Sir William Ramsay | 1852–1916 | chemist | Nobel Prize in Chemistry, 1904 |
| William John Macquorn Rankine | 1820–1872 | engineer, physicist | Rankine thermodynamic scale (absolute temperature), proposer |
| John Richardson | 1787–1865 | naturalist | |
| Marjorie Ritchie | 1948–2015 | animal researcher | part of the team who first cloned a mammal (Dolly the sheep) from an adult cell |
| Muriel Robertson | 1883–1973 | protozoologist and bacteriologist | Made key discoveries of the life cycle of trypanosomes |
| William Roxburgh | 1759–1815 | botanist | |
| John Scott Russell | 1808–1882 | civil engineer, naval architect | solitons |
| Daniel Rutherford | 1749–1819 | chemist | nitrogen element discoverer |
| John Scouler | 1804–1871 | naturalist | Enicurus scouleri is named after Scouler |
| Sir James Young Simpson | 1811–1870 | physician | anaesthetic chloroform discoverer, midwifery pioneer |
| Sir James Ferguson Skea | Born 1953 | climatology | Chair of the Intergovernmental Panel on Climate Change from 2023 |
| Andrew Smith | 1797–1872 | zoologist | |
| Charles Piazzi Smyth | 1819–1900 | astronomer | Astronomer Royal for Scotland |
| Robert Angus Smith | 1817–1884 | chemist | environmental chemistry, acid rain, discoverer |
| Mary Somerville | 1780–1872 | mathematician, astronomer | |
| Matthew Stewart | 1717–1785 | mathematician | |
| James Stirling | 1692–1770 | mathematician | |
| Robert Stirling | 1790–1878 | engineer, clergyman | inventor of the Stirling engine |
| John Struthers | 1823–1899 | anatomist | |
| Peter Guthrie Tait | 1831–1901 | mathematical physicist | proposer of the Tait conjectures in Knot theory |
| Thomas Telford | 1757–1834 | engineer, architect | civil engineer, canal builder |
| D'Arcy Wentworth Thompson | 1860–1948 | biologist and mathematician | author of On Growth and Form |
| Charles Wyville Thomson | 1830–1882 | marine zoologist | chief scientist on the Challenger expedition |
| Thomas Thomson | 1817–1878 | botanist | Superintendent of the Honourable East India Company's Botanic Garden at Calcutta |
| William Thomson, Lord Kelvin | 1824–1907 | mathematician, physicist, engineer | |
| James Wallace | 1684–1724 | botanist | participated in the Darien Scheme, and obtained plants from that area |
| James Watt | 1736–1819 | mathematician, engineer | steam engine improvements contributed key stage in the Industrial Revolution |
| Robert Watson-Watt | 1892–1973 | scientist | radar inventor |
| Joseph Wedderburn | 1882–1948 | mathematician | |
| Thomas Webster | 1773–1844 | geologist | geologist who had websterite, now normally called aluminite, named after him |
| Alexander Wilson | 1714–1786 | astronomer and meteorologist | also surgeon, type-founder, and mathematician; the first scientist to record the use of kites in meteorological investigations |
| Alexander Wilson | 1766–1813 | ornithologist | ornithology pioneer pre-Audubon (American) |
| Charles Wilson | 1869–1959 | physicist | cloud chamber inventor |
| James Wilson | 1795–1856 | zoologist | contributor to Encyclopædia Britannica |
| Patrick Wilson | 1743–1811 | astronomer | type-founder, mathematician and meteorologist |
| Thomas Wright | 1809–1884 | geologist | also physician |
| William Wright | 1735–1819 | botanist | botanist who had genera Wrightia and Wrightea named after him |
| James 'Paraffin' Young | 1811–1883 | chemist | |
| Dr William Alexander Young | 1889–1928 | physician, yellow fever researcher | posthumously awarded the Médaille des Épidémies du ministère de la France d'outre-mer, 1929 |
| Udny Yule | 1871–1951 | statistician | Yule–Simon distribution |
| Andrew White Young | 1891–1968 | mathematician | researched temperature seiches in Loch Earn and presented on Mathieu function and Lagrange polynomials |
