= Robert Pollock Gillespie =

Scottish mathematician

Robert Pollock Gillespie FRSE (1903–1977) was a Scottish mathematician. He was twice President of the Edinburgh Mathematical Society (1946–7 and 1968–9). He published several important books on mathematics.

== Life ==
He was born on 21 November 1903 in Johnstone, Renfrewshire the son of Thomas Gillespie a butcher and his wife, Jane Pollock. He was raised at Ashcot on Kilbarchan Road in Johnstone. He was educated locally then at Paisley Grammar School where he was dux. He then won a bursary to study Mathematics and Natural Philosophy (Physics) at Glasgow University graduating MA BSc in 1924. He did further postgraduate studies under E. W. Hobson at Cambridge University from 1924 to 1927 under a William Bryce Scholarship, gaining his doctorate (PhD) in 1932 due to a delay in submitting his thesis.

He began lecturing in Mathematics at Glasgow University in 1929 under Prof Thomas Murray MacRobert and alongside Dr T S Graham. In 1933 he was elected a Fellow of the Royal Society of Edinburgh due to his numerous publications on mathematics. His proposers were Thomas Murray MacRobert, Neil M'Arthur, Richard Alexander Robb and William Arthur.

In the Second World War he served first in the Clyde River Patrol and in 1941 moved to the Air Traffic Control division of the RAF based at Prestwick. He served on the University Air Squadron after the war.

In 1948 he was promoted to Senior Lecturer at Glasgow and remained there until retiral in 1969. On retiral he moved to Edzell and indulged his love as an amateur artist.

He died in Edzell on 1 January 1977.

== Family ==
He was married to Maisie Bowman, daughter of Prof A. A. Bowman. Their son Alistair Gillespie was also a mathematician.

== Publications ==
- Integration (1939)
- Partial Differentiation (1951)
- Solving Problems in Advanced Calculus (1972)
