= Edward Taylor Jones =

British physicist

Edward Taylor Jones F.R.S.E. LL.D. (1872–1961) was a British physicist. He was Professor of Natural Philosophy at Glasgow University from 1925 to 1943.

== Life ==
He was born in Denbigh in north Wales on 24 December 1872. He studied Science at the University of North Wales and did further postgraduate of the University of Berlin. From 1899 until 1925 he was Professor of Natural Philosophy at his alma mater, the University of North Wales, and then moved to the University of Glasgow for the remainder of his career. The main focus of his work was electromagnetism, atomic physics and quantum theory.

In 1927 he was elected a Fellow of the Royal Society of Edinburgh. His proposers were Donald MacAlister, George Alexander Gibson, Thomas Hastie Bryce and Thomas Stewart Patterson. He resigned in 1945. From 1937 to 1940 he was President of the Royal Philosophical Society of Glasgow.

He received an honorary doctorate (LLD) in 1944.
