= Richard Robb =

Richard Alexander Robb FRSE (1901–1977) was a Scottish mathematician, statistician and astronomer.

A keen athlete, he won the Scottish 100m sprint and represented Great Britain in the 1928 Olympic Games in Amsterdam on the sprint team (but won no medals).

== Life ==
He was born in Glasgow on 7 September 1901. He was educated at Queen's Park School and in 1918 entered Glasgow University to study Mathematics and Natural Philosophy (Physics). He won a Walter Scott Bursary to help with his expenses. He graduated MA with Honours in 1922 and BSc in 1923. Winning a further Euing Scholarship and Commonwealth Fund Fellowship allowed him to do postgraduate studies at the University of Michigan 1926 to 1928. Returning to Glasgow University, he then began lecturing in mathematics.

In 1929, he was elected a Fellow of the Royal Society of Edinburgh. His proposers were Thomas Murray MacRobert, John McWhan, Donald McArthur and William Arthur. He was elected a Fellow of the Royal Astronomical Society in 1931. He was President of the Edinburgh Mathematical Society 1934/5.

He spent some time at the University of Lund in Sweden, studying astronomy and on his return was awarded his first doctorate (DSc) by Glasgow in 1936. In 1944, he became the Mitchell Lecturer in Statistics.

He retired in 1966 and died on 22 March 1977 in Eaglesham, where he lived with his sister.

== Publications ==
- Studies in Stellar Statistics (1936)
