= James Napier =

James Napier may refer to:

- James Napier (chemist) (1810–1884), Scottish chemist and antiquarian
- James Robert Napier (1821–1879), Scottish engineer, inventor of Napier's diagram
- James Carroll Napier (1845–1940), American businessman, civil rights leader, and Register of the Treasury
- Jim Napier (1938–2018), American baseball catcher and manager
- Jimmy Napes (James Napier), British songwriter, producer and musician
- James Napier Robertson (born 1982), New Zealand writer, actor, film director and producer, sometimes credited as James Napier
