= Thomas Murray MacRobert =

Scottish mathematician

Thomas Murray MacRobert FRSE (4 April 1884, in Dreghorn, Ayrshire – 1 November 1962, in Glasgow) was a Scottish mathematician. He became professor of mathematics at the University of Glasgow and introduced the MacRobert E function, a generalisation of the generalised hypergeometric series.

== Life ==
He was born on 4 April 1884 in the manse at Dreghorn, Ayrshire in south-west Scotland, the son of Rev Thomas MacRobert and his wife, Isabella Edgely Fisher. He was educated at Irvine Royal Academy with his identical twin brother, Alexander, then studied divinity at Glasgow University but transferred to study mathematics and natural philosophy (physics), graduating in 1905. He then took a second degree at Trinity College, Cambridge.

In 1910 he joined the staff of Glasgow University as an assistant to Professor Gibson, lecturing in mathematics.

In the First World War he served in the Royal Garrison Artillery and saw active service in France.

In 1921 he was elected a fellow of the Royal Society of Edinburgh. His proposers were Andrew Gray, George Alexander Gibson, James Gordon Gray and Robert Alexander Houston. He was President of the Edinburgh Mathematical Society 1921/22. He resigned from the RSE in 1940.

Glasgow University granted him an honorary doctorate (LLD) in 1955.

He retired in 1954 and died in Glasgow on 1 November 1962.

== Family ==
In 1914, before going to war, he married Violet McIlwraith; they initially lived in a flat in North Kelvinside in Glasgow. They had three children: Violet, Tom and Alexander. He was a member of the Glasgow temperance movement and enjoyed hill-walking.

== Artistic recognition ==
His portrait by Norman Hepple is held by the Hunterian Art Gallery in Glasgow.

== Publications ==
- MacRobert, Thomas M (1913). "On the sufficiency of the condition for a limit". Mathematical Notes. 12: 141–142. doi:10.1017/S1757748900001109.
- Functions of a Complex Variable (1917)
- Spherical Harmonics (1927)
- Trigonometry (1938)
- Higher Trigonometry (1943)
- Spherical Trigonometry (1946)
- A Short Introduction to Fine Typography (1957)
