= Meier function =

In mathematics, Meier function might refer to:

- Kaplan–Meier estimator
- Meijer G-function
