= MacRobert E function =

In mathematics, the E-function was introduced by Thomas Murray MacRobert (1937–1938) to extend the generalized hypergeometric series _{p}F_{q}(·) to the case p > q + 1. The underlying objective was to define a very general function that includes as particular cases the majority of the special functions known until then. However, this function had no great impact on the literature as it can always be expressed in terms of the Meijer G-function, while the opposite is not true, so that the G-function is of a still more general nature. It is defined as:

$$\begin{align}
E(p;\alpha_r;\rho_s;z)
\equiv {} & \frac{\Gamma(\alpha_{q+1})}{\prod_{k=1}^q\Gamma(\rho_k-\alpha_k)} \prod_{\mu=1}^q \int_0^\infty\lambda_\mu^{\rho_\mu-\alpha_\mu-a}(\lambda_\mu+1)^{-\rho_\mu} \, d\lambda_\mu \\
& \times \prod_{\nu=2}^{p-q-1} \int_0^\infty \lambda_{q+\nu}^{\alpha_{q+\nu}-1}\exp(-\lambda_{q+\nu})
\, d\lambda_{q+\nu} \\
& \times \int_0^\infty\lambda_p^{\alpha_p-1}\exp(-\lambda_p) \left[\frac{\prod_{k=q+2}^p\lambda_k}{z\prod_{k=1}^q\lambda_k+1}+1\right] \, d\lambda_p
\end{align}$$

== Definition ==
There are several ways to define the MacRobert E-function; the following definition is in terms of the generalized hypergeometric function:

- when p ≤ q and x ≠ 0, or p = q + 1 and |x| > 1:

$$E \!\left( \left. \begin{matrix} \mathbf{a_p} \\ \mathbf{b_q} \end{matrix} \; \right| \, x \right)
= \frac{\prod_{j=1}^p \Gamma (a_j)} {\prod_{j=1}^q \Gamma (b_j)}
\;_p F_q \!\left( \left. \begin{matrix} \mathbf{a_p} \\ \mathbf{b_q} \end{matrix} \; \right| \, -x^{-1} \right)$$

- when p ≥ q + 2, or p = q + 1 and |x| < 1:

$$E \!\left( \left. \begin{matrix} \mathbf{a_p} \\ \mathbf{b_q} \end{matrix} \; \right| \, x \right)
= \sum_{h=1}^p \frac{\prod_{j=1}^p \Gamma (a_j - a_h)^*}
{\prod_{j=1}^q \Gamma (b_j - a_h)} \Gamma (a_h) \; x^{a_h}
\;_{q+1}F_{p-1} \!\left( \left. \begin{matrix} a_h, 1 + a_h - b_1, \dots, 1 + a_h - b_q \\ 1 + a_h - a_1, \dots, *, \dots, 1 + a_h - a_p \end{matrix} \; \right| \, (-1)^{p-q} \;x \right).$$

The asterisks here remind us to ignore the contribution with index j = h as follows: In the product this amounts to replacing Γ(0) with 1, and in the argument of the hypergeometric function this amounts to shortening the vector length from p to p − 1. Evidently, this definition covers all values of p and q.

== Relationship with the Meijer G-function ==
The MacRobert E-function can always be expressed in terms of the Meijer G-function:

$$E \!\left( \left. \begin{matrix} \mathbf{a_p} \\ \mathbf{b_q} \end{matrix} \; \right| \, x \right)  =
G_{q+1,\,p}^{\,p,\,1} \!\left( \left. \begin{matrix} 1, \mathbf{b_q} \\ \mathbf{a_p} \end{matrix} \; \right| \, x \right)$$

where the parameter values are unrestricted, i.e. this relation holds without exception.
