= Jacques Focard =

French astromer and author

Jacques Focard was a French author and astronomer.

Jacques was active in the 16th century and wrote the book Paraphrase de l'Astrolabe. Paraphrase de l'Astrolabe was published in Lyon in 1546. Focard was one of the first authors to utilize the name America in reference to the new world following its naming by Martin Waldseemüller 50 years earlier. Focard wrote at length about subjects like mathematics and astronomy. Focard's work focused on the contemporary use of astrolabes within France in the early 16th century. Focard also coauthored manuals on the usage of Astrolabes with Auger Ferrier one such treatise being titled Briefve & isagogique Introduction sur la Judiciare Astrologie which focused mainly on the surveying of stars for use in astrological charts.

Focard utilized many modern charts and tools when writing manuals including the polar projection map designed by Gualtier Lud for use in Tractatus Speculi Orbis which Focard included in his book Paraphrase de l'Astrolabe.

Paraphrase de l'Astrolabe was a popular work that focused on the methods and techniques in the usage of the Astrolabe alongside other authors like Bassantin. Jacques works remain in publication to this day. Bassantin authored a corrected edition of Paraphrase de l'Astrolabe that included an addendum added by Bassantin entitled Une Amplification de l'usage de l'Astrolabe in 1555.
