= Cornelis Simon Meijer =

Dutch mathematician (1904–1974)

Cornelis Simon Meijer (17 August 1904, Pieterburen – 12 April 1974) was a Dutch mathematician at the University of Groningen who introduced the Meijer G-function, a very general function that includes most of the elementary and higher mathematical functions as special cases; he also introduced generalizations of the Laplace transform that are referred to as Meijer transforms.
