= Fracture (mineralogy) =

Shape and texture of the surface formed when a mineral is fractured

In the field of mineralogy, fracture is the texture and shape of a rock's surface formed when a mineral is fractured. Minerals often have a highly distinctive fracture, making it a principal feature used in their identification.

Fracture differs from cleavage in that the latter involves clean splitting along the cleavage planes of the mineral's crystal structure, as opposed to more general breakage. All minerals exhibit fracture, but when very strong cleavage is present, it can be difficult to see.

== Terminology ==
Five types of fractures are recognized in mineralogy: conchoidal, earthy, hackly, splintery (or fibrous), and uneven factures.

=== Conchoidal fracture ===
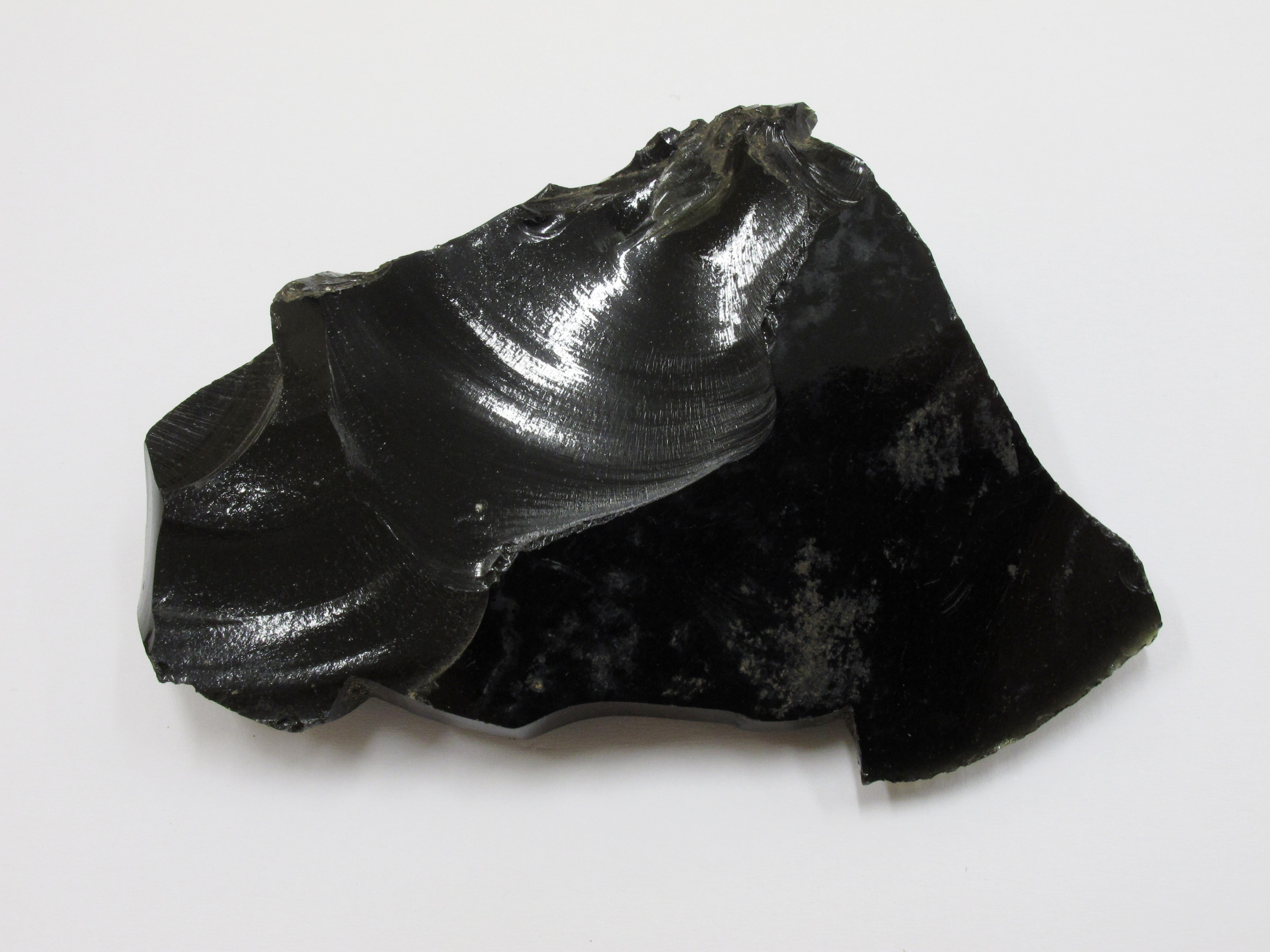
Obsidian

Conchoidal fracture breakage that resembles the concentric ripples of a mussel shell. It often occurs in amorphous or fine-grained mineraloids such as flint, opal or obsidian, but may also occur in crystalline minerals such as quartz. Subconchoidal fracture is similar to conchoidal fracture, but with less significant curvature. Note that obsidian is an igneous rock, not a mineral, but it does illustrate conchoidal fracture well.

=== Earthy fracture ===
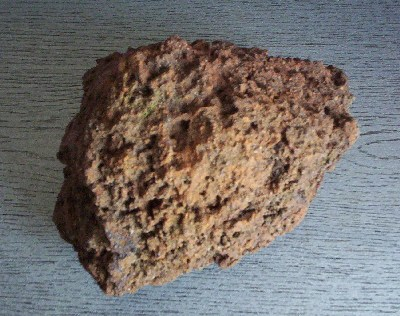
Limonite

Earthy fracture is reminiscent of freshly broken soil. It is frequently seen in relatively soft, loosely bound minerals, such as limonite, kaolinite and aluminite.

=== Hackly fracture ===
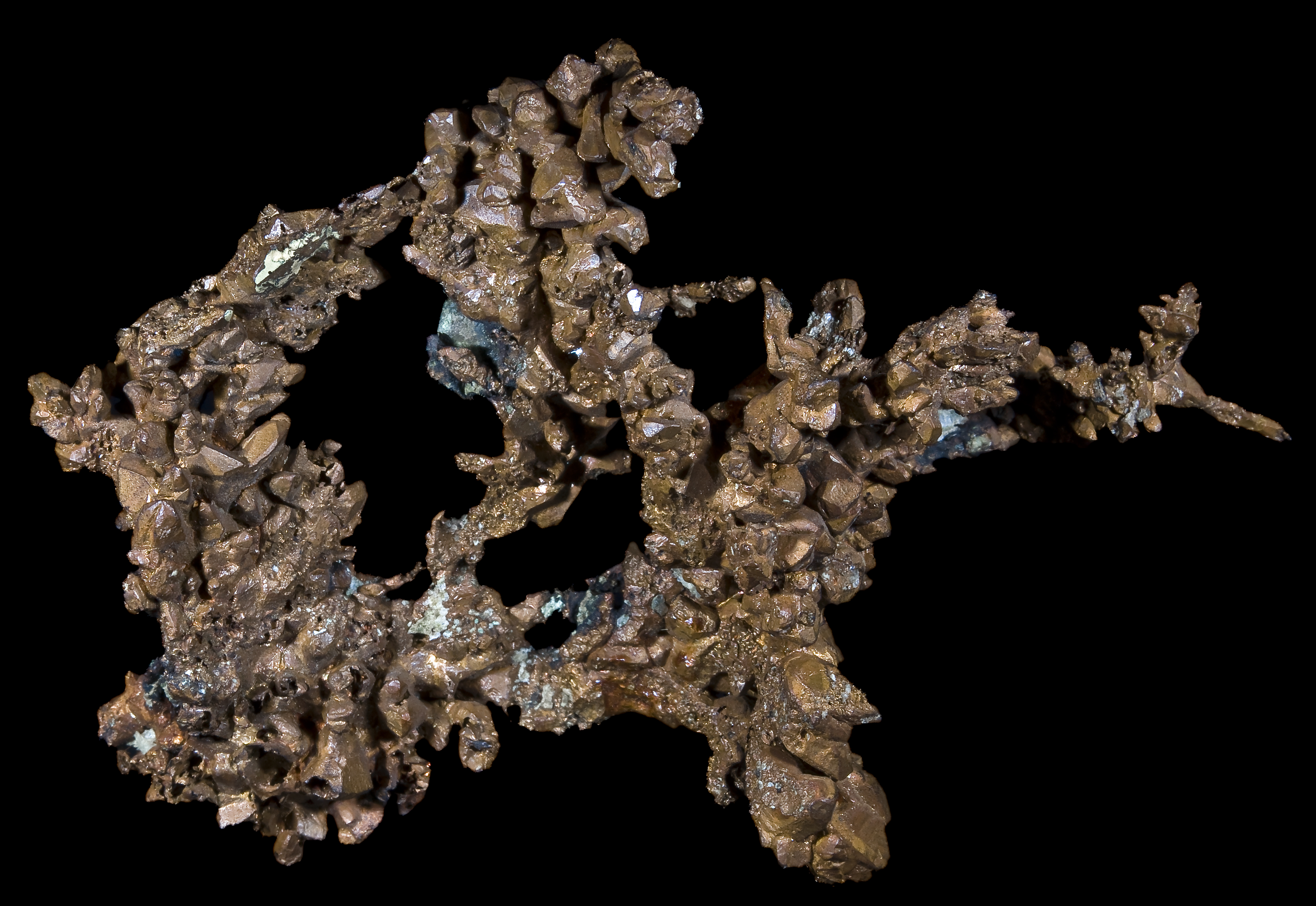
Native copper

Hackly fracture (also known as jagged fracture) is jagged, sharp and not even. It occurs when metals are torn, and so is often encountered in native metals such as copper and silver.

=== Splintery fracture ===
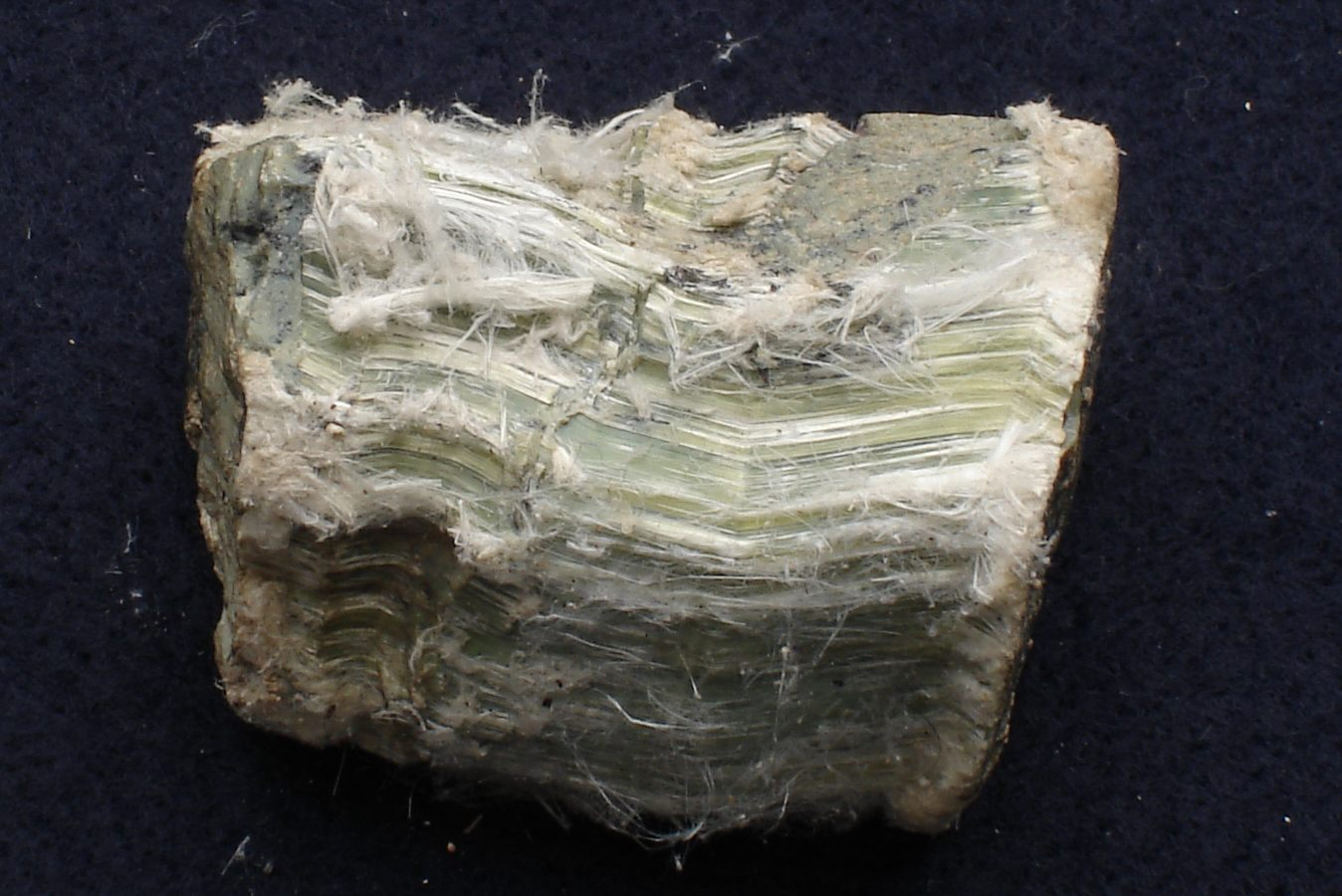
Chrysotile

Splintery fracture comprises sharp elongated points. It is particularly seen in fibrous minerals such as chrysotile, but may also occur in non-fibrous minerals such as kyanite.

=== Uneven fracture ===
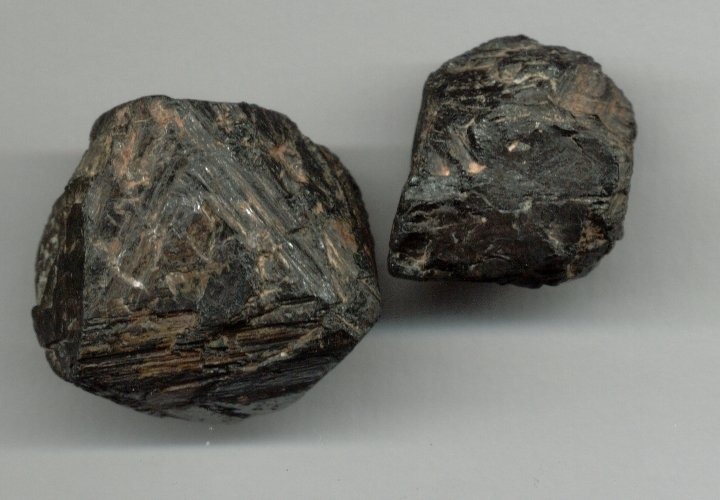
Magnetite

Uneven fracture is a rough surface or one with random irregularities. It occurs in a wide range of minerals including arsenopyrite, pyrite and magnetite.

== See also ==
- Cleavage (crystal)
- Fracture (geology)
- Mineral#Cleavage, parting, fracture, and tenacity
