= Thomas Webster (geologist) =

18th/19th-century Scottish geologist

Thomas Webster (11 February 1772 – 26 December 1844) was a Scottish geologist.

== Life ==
Webster was born in Orkney in 1772, probably at Kirkwall, and was educated at Aberdeen. He subsequently went to London and studied architecture, the Royal Institution in Albemarle Street being built from his design, and where in 1830 he delivered the Royal Institution Christmas Lecture. In 1826 he was appointed house-secretary and curator to the Geological Society of London, and for many years he rendered important services in editing and illustrating the Transactions of the Society. From 1841–44 he was the first Professor of Geology at University College, London. He was an accomplished water-colour painter and was elected an honorary member of the Sketch Society. He contributed articles about Architecture and Aquatinta to Rees's Cyclopædia. An Encyclopaedia of Domestic Economy, a comprehensive guide to running a household which Webster had compiled with the help of a Mrs. Parkes, was published after his death in 1844.

He was distinguished for his researches on the Cenozoic formations of the Isle of Wight, where he recognised the occurrence of both fresh-water and marine strata; he continued his observations on the mainland of Hampshire, and subsequently in Dorset, where he described the rocks of the Isle of Purbeck and Isle of Portland.

Sir Henry Charles Englefield was indebted to him for the geological descriptions and the effective geological views and sections of the Isle of Wight and Dorset that enriched his Description of the Principal Picturesque Beauties, Antiquities and Geological Phenomena of the Isle of Wight (1816). The mineral websterite now known as aluminite was named after him.

He died in London on 26 December 1844 and is buried on the western side of Highgate Cemetery. His grave (no.1311) no longer has a legible headstone or memorial.

== Sources ==
- Boulger, George Simonds (1899). "Webster, Thomas (1773-1844)" . In Lee, Sidney (ed.). Dictionary of National Biography. Vol. 60. London: Smith, Elder & Co.
- Hughes, Kathryn (2005). The Short Life and Long Times of Mrs Beeton. London: HarperCollins Publishers. ISBN 978-0-7524-6122-9.
