= James Bassantin =

Scottish astronomer and mathematician

James Bassantin (fl. 1568), was a Scottish astronomer and mathematician.

== Life ==
Bassantin was the son of the laird of Bassendean in the Merse, Berwickshire, and was born in the reign of James IV of Scotland (1486–1513). He entered the University of Glasgow at an early age, and, after finishing his studies in belles-lettres and philosophy, applied himself to mathematics. He travelled through the Low Countries, Switzerland, France, Italy, and Germany, and finally settled in Paris, where for several years he taught mathematics.

He returned to Scotland in 1562. On the way there, according to Sir James Melville, he met Sir Robert Melville (Sir James's brother), and predicted to him as the result of his studies that there would be captivity and ruin for Mary Queen of Scots at the Queen of England's hands, and also that the kingdom of England would at length fall of right to the crown of Scotland; but at the cost of many bloody battles, at which the Spanish would be helpers. Bassantin was a keen politician, and a supporter of the regent James Stewart, 1st Earl of Moray. He died in 1568.

== Works ==
His planetary system was that of Ptolemy. His major work is Astronomique Discours, Lyons, 1557. A Latin translation, under the title Astronomia Jacobi Bassantini Scoti, opus absolutissimum, was published at Geneva in 1599 by Johannes Tornoesius; who in an epistle addressed to Frederick III, Elector Palatine, gives a eulogistic account of the author.

In 1555 Bassantin published at Lyon a corrected edition of the work of Jacques Focard, Paraphrase de l'Astrolabe, to which he added Une Amplification de l'usage de l'Astrolabe. Another edition by Dominique Jacquinot appeared in 1598. Bassantin also wrote 'Super Mathematica Genethlinca,' or 'Calculs des Horoscops:' 'Arithmetica;' 'Musique selon Platon;' and 'De Mathesi in genere,' but probably these were never published.
