= Aluminite =

Sulfate mineral

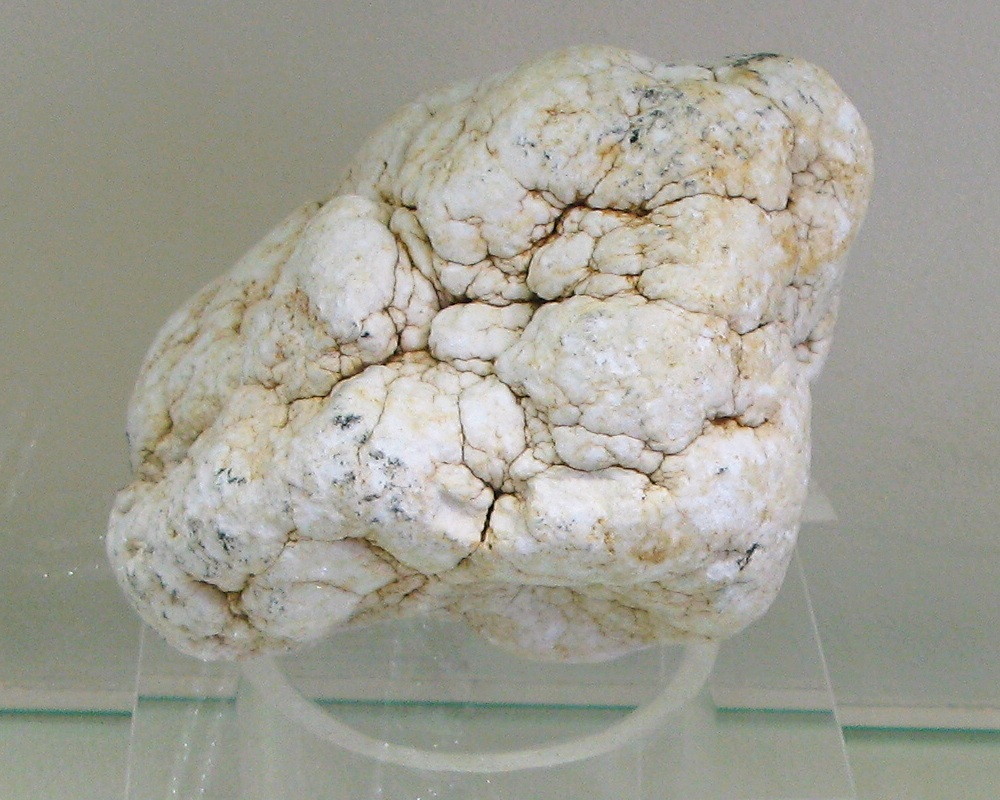
- Aluminite from Newhaven, Sussex, England

General
- Category: Sulfate mineral
- Formula: Al_{2}SO_{4}(OH)_{4}·7H_{2}O
- IMA symbol: A
- Strunz classification: 7.DC.05
- Crystal system: Monoclinic
- Crystal class: Prismatic (2/m) (same H-M symbol)
- Space group: P2_{1}/c
- Unit cell: a = 7.44, b = 15.583 c = 11.7 [Å]; β = 110.18°; Z = 4

Identification
- Color: White to grayish white
- Crystal habit: Needles and fibrous masses
- Cleavage: None
- Fracture: Irregular/uneven
- Tenacity: Friable
- Mohs scale hardness: 1 - 2
- Luster: Dull to earthy
- Streak: White
- Diaphaneity: Translucent, opaque if massive
- Specific gravity: 1.66–1.82
- Optical properties: Biaxial (+)
- Refractive index: n_{α} = 1.459 n_{β} = 1.464 n_{γ} = 1.470
- Birefringence: δ = 0.011
- 2V angle: Measured: 90°, calculated: 86°

Aluminite is a hydrous aluminium sulfate mineral with formula: Al_{2}SO_{4}(OH)_{4}·7H_{2}O. It is an earthy white to gray-white monoclinic mineral which almost never exhibits crystal form. It forms botryoidal to mammillary clay-like masses. It has a very soft Mohs hardness of 1–2 and a specific gravity of 1.66–1.82.

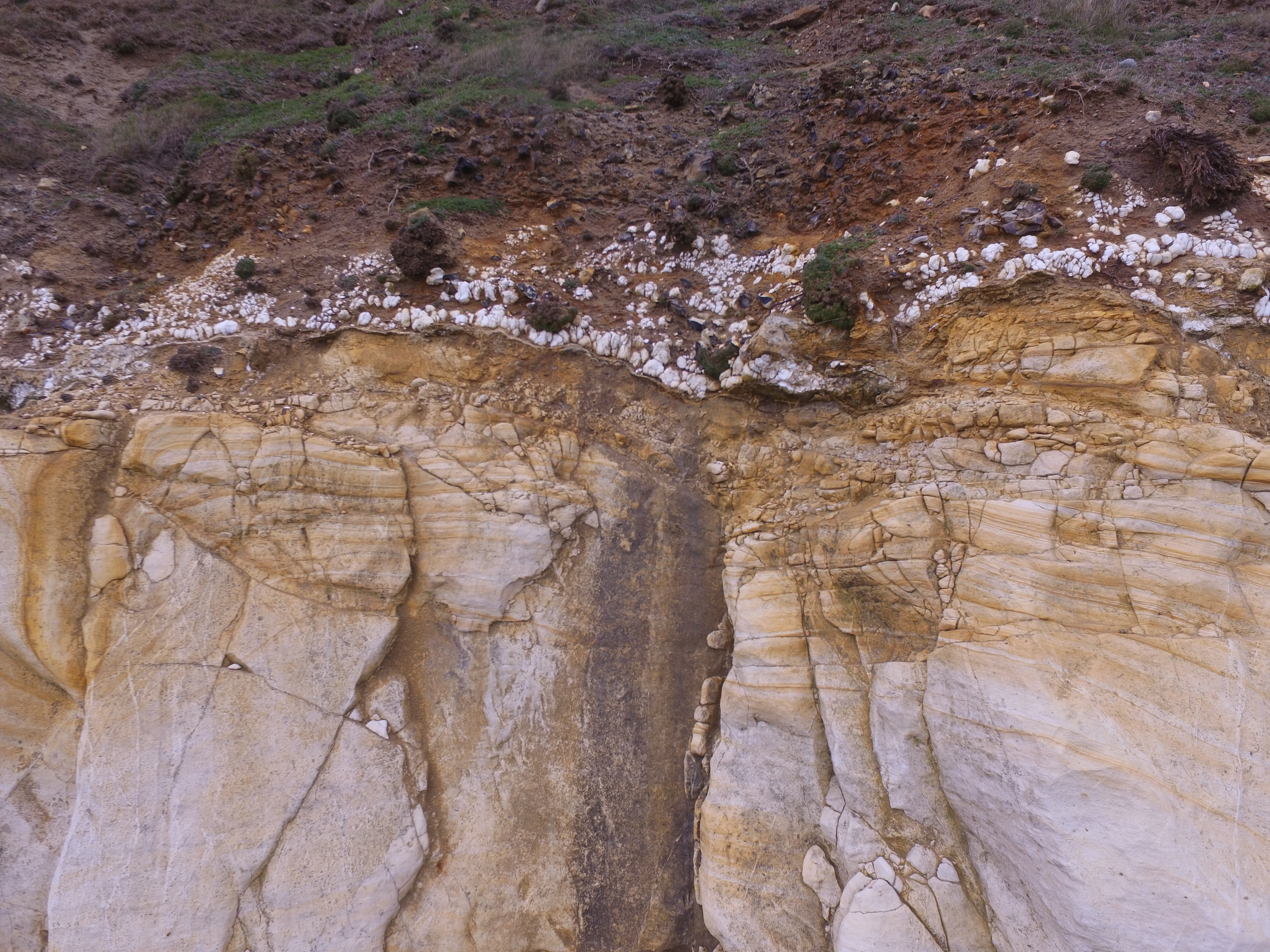
An outcrop of aluminite at the top of the white chalk of the cliff at Newhaven, East Sussex, England.

It forms in clay and lignite deposits as an oxidation product of pyrite and marcasite along with aluminium silicates. It also occurs in volcanic sublimates, in native sulfur deposits and rarely in caves. It occurs in association with basaluminite, gibbsite, epsomite, gypsum, celestine, dolomite and goethite.

It was first described in 1807 from Halle, Saxony-Anhalt, Germany and named for its aluminium content. It is also known as alley stone, halite and websterite (named after Orcadian geologist Thomas Webster).

Aluminite is used by tile and masonry workers to reduce the setting time of mortars.
