= David Drysdale (mathematician) =

Scottish mathematician

- Born: 28 December 1877; Dunfermline, Scotland
- Died: 1946 (aged 68–69); Edinburgh, Scotland
- Education: University of Edinburgh
- Scientific career
- Fields: Mathematics

David Drysdale (Dunfermline, 28 December 1877 – Edinburgh, 1946) was a Scottish mathematician.
