= William Alexander Young =

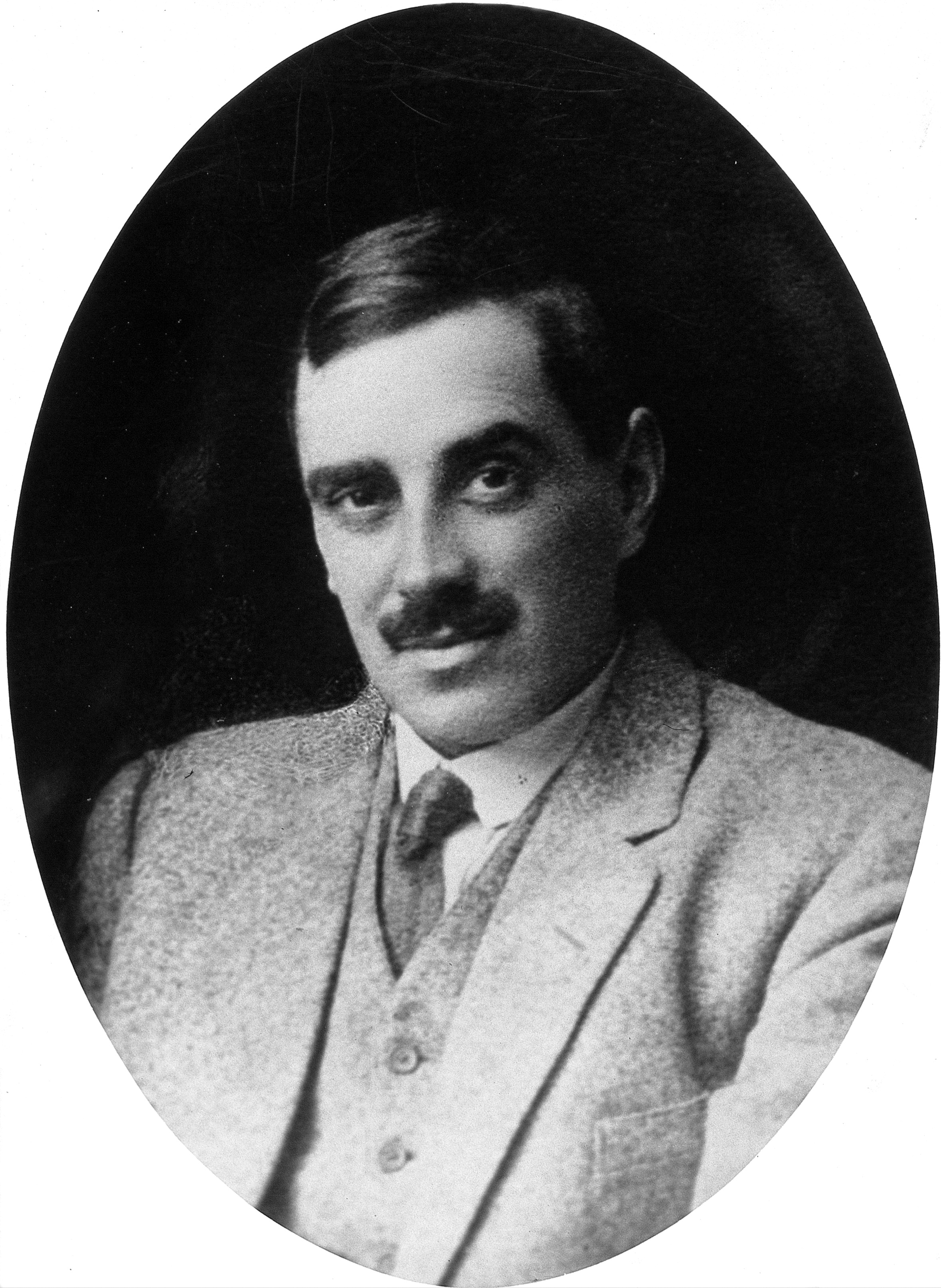
Dr William Alexander Young

William Alexander Young MB, CHB, DPH, DTM (5 November 1889 – 28 May 1928) was a Scottish doctor and surgeon who specialised in tropical medicine. He spent most of his career in West Africa, as a pathologist and bacteriologist with the West African Medical Service, where he studied many of the endemic diseases. The majority of his research was carried out in Nigeria and later at Accra, Gold Coast (modern-day Ghana). He is remembered particularly as having done much to further the understanding of the nature and epidemiology of yellow fever. He died aged 38 of yellow fever, during the course of his research.

== Early life ==
Young studied medicine at University College, Dundee (now the University of Dundee) then a part of the University of St Andrews from 1906 until 1911 and gaining MB ChB with honour in all subjects. He gained experience as a surgeon at the Halifax Royal Infirmary, and then took a course of instruction at the Liverpool School of Tropical Medicine, prior to joining the West African Medical Staff in 1913. During the First World War he held a commission as lieutenant in the Royal Army Medical Corps, serving with the Expeditionary Force in the Cameroons campaign in 1915–1916.

== Research ==
In September 1920, he served with the West African Medical Service in Nigeria as assistant bacteriologist at the Medical Research Institute and later was appointed assistant director of the Medical Research Institute at Lagos. From June to December 1923, he was attached to the Nigerian Tsetse Investigation Staff. He then transferred to the Gold Coast on appointment as pathologist. In September 1924, he became director of the Medical Research Institute at Accra.

During his time in West Africa Young made detailed studies of syphilis, trypanosomiasis, blackwater fever, plague, dysentery, coccidiosis, dermatology and yellow fever, submitting papers on a diverse range of topics to medical journals, including Transactions of the Royal Society of Tropical Medicine and Hygiene, the Journal of Tropical Medicine and Hygiene, the British Medical Journal and the West African Medical Journal. Although a generalist, he took a special interest in yellow fever, and worked closely with researchers from the Rockefeller Institute.

Young was also particularly interested in tsetse fly research. In 1923 he spent six months living and working at a tsetse research station at Sherifuri, Nigeria, accompanied by his wife, a nursing sister. To reach the field camp they set off from Lagos, and travelled by train to Kano (city). As no transport was available from Kano to Sherifuri, they cycled east from Kano, averaging 17 miles a day, sleeping in rest camps and followed by porters carrying enough stores and luggage for a one-year stay. They lived at the Sherifuri Camp, in specially built mud huts, along with one other researcher, a Dr Johnson. Local workers were employed to catch tsetse fly, using black umbrellas to attract them. The flies were then studied on site. His research into infections caused by the flies to both man and cattle were continued after his appointment as Medical Research Director at Accra, and he carried out extensive surveys, touring Ashanti and the Northern Territories.

Young worked exhaustively, both in the laboratory and in the field, often using periods of leave for further research. At his initiative the Medical Research Institute staff was increased and a second facility opened at Sekondi. He also designed and had fitted a mobile motor laboratory for use on field trips.

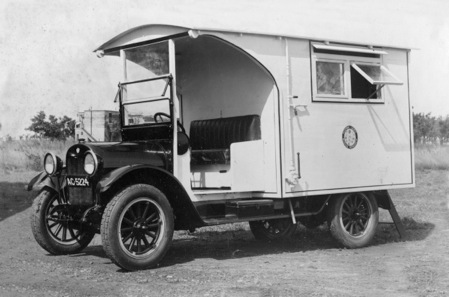
Mobile laboratory designed by Dr William Alexander Young

According to his obituary in the British Medical Journal, "Young's bent was towards investigation, and early in his career in West Africa he undertook studies in the fascinating problems of diseases endemic in that region … each in turn engaged his attention and by careful and painstaking work in the laboratory and in the field he added something to our knowledge of each of them. Incidentally he found time for the study of interesting pathological conditions encountered in the course of routine work, and from 1923 to 1926 he contributed a number of short papers on these subjects to the Transactions of the Royal Society of Tropical Medicine and Hygiene…in annual and special reports he recorded the results of his studies in the epidemiology and pathology of yellow fever, and many of his observations are of first-class importance."

As Director of the Medical Institute, Accra, Young was responsible for overseeing field work investigating local sporadic outbreaks of yellow fever and Professor WH Hoffmann of the Laboratorio Finlay, Havana, Cuba credits him with having found the first endemic focus in Africa: "In the Tropical Congress in Cairo I read a paper on yellow fever in Africa, which I dedicated to the memory of Dr WA Young, who in my opinion has the merit to have found the first endemic focus there." This led to the understanding that the African outbreaks were effectively the same disease as the yellow fever that ravaged the Americas.

== Collaboration with Noguchi ==
Following the death of Adrian Stokes of yellow fever in September 1927, it became increasingly evident that yellow fever was caused by a virus, and moreover that it could be transmitted not only by the bite of the mosquito but also by transmission through the skin if infected material was handled. This was contrary to the theories of Dr Hideyo Noguchi, a leading scientist with the Rockefeller Foundation, who believed the bacillus Leptospira icteroides was responsible.

Feeling his reputation was at stake, Noguchi travelled to Lagos for additional research but found the facilities and work practices there did not suit him. Hearing that Noguchi was desirous of working in Accra, Young enthusiastically invited him to work with him at the Medical Research Institute, and Noguchi made this his base from November 1927. Although Young differed profoundly from Noguchi in his opinion about the nature of yellow fever, he made both facilities and staff available to him and afforded him every possible assistance, and considerable autonomy, turning over to him about half of the floor space of his department, together with the animal houses. In addition, the Rockefeller Foundation assigned several of its researchers to assist. However, Noguchi proved a very difficult guest, working almost entirely at night and avoiding contact with fellow researchers. His methods were haphazard.

According to the diaries of Oskar Klotz, another researcher with the Rockefeller Foundation, Noguchi inoculated increasing numbers of monkeys and apes with material from suspected yellow fever cases, or other infective tissue, causing such overcrowding in the animal houses that tags were pulled off and proper records could not be kept. His temper was volatile and explosive. He refused to work with the laboratory technicians, who tried in vain to keep the monkeys and the records in order, and allowed no fellow researchers into his laboratory.

Klotz relates: "He commanded the boys to do this or to do that, and when they appeared slow in carrying out instructions he yelled at them, chased them, and threw what was handy at them until all was in an uproar. Then his exasperation would upset him completely and he would go on to the porch of the laboratory and yell and tear his hair. His commotion was heard at the pavilion of the Korley Bu Hospital and at the bungalows behind the grounds of the Institute. This state became worse during the late months of spring, and not a few thought he must be mentally unbalanced."

British officials, according to Klotz, were unable to understand the situation and loath to criticise Noguchi. Young's letters refer to particular difficulties with Percy Selwyn-Clarke, the British Health Officer, whom he found obstructive and self serving. Of the Rockefeller staff, Dr Mahaffey alone was willing to help Young manage Noguchi. Young was the only person he would listen to and even so, he repeatedly broke promises to Young to employ safer working practices. It is possible that, believing himself immune to yellow fever, having been inoculated with a vaccine of his own development, he was indifferent about the possibility of infection or even that he deliberately courted infection, fulfilling a youthful motto, "Success or suicide". In any case he was reckless of the safety of those around him and failed to keep infected mosquitoes in the specially designed secure housing.

Klotz describes Young's fury at finding that Noguchi had placed mosquito traps and cages in the very place he had forbidden them: "The entire laboratory staff was endangered, as the small cages were of poor construction and not entirely proof against escape. Young brought the matter to Noguchi and accused him of breaking his word. Noguchi apologized and begged forgiveness. Young's good heart forgave him, with the demand that care for others must be considered. Even with this and several other encounters between Noguchi and Young, infected mosquitos were again found beyond the boundaries agreed upon".

JS Porterfield describes a visit by Dr Philip of the Rockefeller Foundation to Noguchi's laboratory: "Philip (visited) the Medical Research Institute but found Noguchi asleep, having worked all night, as he frequently did to avoid other members of the laboratory. Philip had intended to take some infected mosquitoes from Accra to Lagos but on inspecting the cages found so many holes through which mosquitoes might escape that he decided not to take any...conditions in Noguchi's laboratory were chaotic."

In May 1928 Noguchi, having failed to find evidence to support his theories, was set to return to New York and Young heaved a sigh of relief. However, Noguchi was taken ill in Lagos. He boarded his ship to sail home but on 12 May he was put ashore at Accra and admitted to hospital with yellow fever. After lingering for some days, he died on 21 May.

In a letter home, dated 23 May 1928, Young states, "He died suddenly noon Monday. I saw him Sunday afternoon – he smiled – and amongst other things, said “Are you sure you are quite well?" "Quite." I said, and then [he said] "I don’t understand". Young's letters go on to state that he had performed a post mortem one hour after death and had concluded that Noguchi had contracted the disease from handling infected tissue without gloves. At this time he was unaware of the extent of contamination in Noguchi's laboratory, and that promises about the containment of infected mosquitoes had again been broken. According to his last letters, Young spent the next days cleaning Noguchi's laboratory and ensuring all infective material was contained or destroyed and escaped mosquitoes exterminated. Acutely aware of the danger, he carried out much of the decontamination personally. His last letter home was written on 25 May, and he pronounced himself tired but fit. Knowing that news of Noguchi's death would already have been published to the world and that his letters would take some time to arrive, he took the precaution of preceding them with a telegram, also dated 25 May, stating "Absolutely fit". However, on the 26th he was taken ill with acute yellow fever and died on 30 May (not on 29 May as many sources suggest), almost certainly as a result of Noguchi's negligence.

== Circumstances of death ==
It has been suggested that Young may have contracted yellow fever during the course of the autopsy on Noguchi. This belief may have circulated largely because of the release of a photograph showing Young and Dr Helen Russell, another colonial researcher at Accra, standing next to Noguchi at a dissection bench and not wearing gloves. The photograph however was a posed Rockefeller press release. Dr Russell states "We were just called in to look at something when the photograph was taken." Dr Russell goes on to state: "[Dr Young] wore gloves for all the experimental yellow fever work I saw him do. He never handled the monkeys himself when Dr Noguchi was alive... I do not know really how Dr Young was infected but I am quite sure it was not at the p.m. [post mortem] on Dr Noguchi". Since Young believed the cause of Noguchi's own death to have been the handling of infected tissue without gloves, it is certain he himself wore them, as was his usual practice. An obituary in the British Medical Journal states:

"In a letter received in London only a few weeks ago Young discussed his own recent observations on the infectivity of post-mortem material in experimental work on yellow fever. He was therefore well aware of the grave risk he ran in performing a necropsy upon his colleague, and it is not to be doubted that so careful a man took every precaution to avoid infection."

It is likely he died as the result of a mosquito bite while making safe Noguchi's laboratory. Dr Russell states: "I never could exclude mosquito infection because [Dr Young] and others had to destroy everything including mosquitoes when Dr Noguchi died and it is not outside the limit of possibility that the infection occurred then". This belief is supported by an address by Dr Duff, Director of Medical Services, Accra, 1938, who, in a speech at the unveiling of a memorial to Noguchi and Young, commented "It was thought by some that Dr Young incurred that fatal infection when making a post mortem on the body of Noguchi, but I rather believe that he was bitten by an infected mosquito which had accidentally escaped in the room where Noguchi was working." Young himself locked Noguchi's laboratory and allowed no-one but himself to enter for fear of infection. He said to one of his assistants "No one is to go into the laboratory used by Professor Noguchi for one does not know what is infective and what is not".

== Posthumous honours ==
Young was a painstaking and meticulous researcher who was popular with both colleagues and staff. Such was the esteem in which his employees held him that even 15 years after his death, memorial services were still held in his memory at Accra. "A general wish was expressed that a letter be sent to Mrs Young to assure her that never in this long period has Dr Young been absent from our thoughts...This continued remembrance is not an ordinary duty of an Institute Staff – it lies in the pride we all feel in having served Dr Young who was also our friend."

In recognition of Young's work and extraordinary courage the French awarded him posthumously the Médaille des Épidémies du Ministère de la France d'Outre-Mer, which subsequently became the Gold Military Health Service Medal. The citation states that he is awarded the Gold Medal (which is awarded only in exceptional circumstances) "in witness of the exceptional devotion to duty he has shown in continuing research on the virus after the death of Professor Noguchi." In 1938 a memorial plaque was unveiled by the Governor of the Gold Coast, Sir Arnold Wienholt Hodson KCMG.

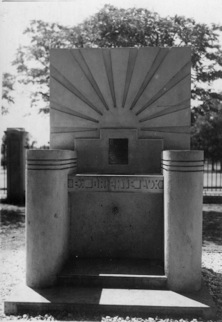
Memorial fountain erected in memory of Dr H Noguchi and Dr WA Young

In 1961 the Japanese encouraged the British to erect a bronze statue of Young in Accra, but the proposal was quashed after consultation with Percy Selwyn-Clarke, Young's old adversary.

== Personal life ==
Young was born in London to Charles Morris Young, an agent of a canvas manufacturer, and Agnes Ann White, daughter of William and Grace White of Letham, Angus, Scotland. Young was married in 1916 to Olive Muriel (Nadina) Ashley, a nursing sister from Tenbury Wells. Although based in Scotland, she divided her time between their home in Letham, Angus, and with her husband in West Africa, and accompanied him during his secondment to the tsetse research station in Sherifuri, Nigeria. She had been with him only days before Noguchi was taken ill and had left her husband in excellent health. He was survived by one daughter, Nancy Muriel Wenlock Young, a brother, Sydney Morris Young, and by his mother, who was awarded a small annuity by the Rockefeller Foundation in recognition of the hospitality her son had extended to Noguchi. Young's grave at Osu Cemetery, Accra, bears the inscription "To tread the walks of death he stood prepared, and what he greatly thought he nobly dared".
