= Thomas Stewart Patterson =

Scottish organic chemist

Thomas Stewart Patterson FRSE LLD (1872–1949) was a Scottish organic chemist, especially known for his work on stereochemistry.

== Early life and education ==
He was born in Greenock on 3 July 1872, but his family came to Edinburgh in his youth and he was then educated at Merchiston Castle School. He then studied Chemistry at Andersonian college in Glasgow under Prof William Dittmar.

He then went to Heidelberg where he gained his first doctorate (PhD) in 1896. He was greatly influenced there by Victor Meyer. Returning to Britain, he was the first Priestley scholar at the University of Birmingham. In 1904, he began lecturing in Chemistry at Glasgow University. He married Elizabeth Paterson Johnstone in 1905. In 1919, he became the first Gardiner chair of Organic Chemistry.

== Career ==
In 1919, he was elected a Fellow of the Royal Society of Edinburgh. His proposers were Alexander Gray, George Alexander Gibson, John Glaister, Diarmid Noel Paton, Ralph Stockman, Thomas Hastie Bryce, Robert Muir, Frederick Orpen Bower and Robert Alexander Houston. He resigned from the Society in 1931.

It was one of the two pioneers of stereochemistry in Great Britain, namely, Prof. Percy Frankland, who attracted him to that particular branch which deals with the connexion between optical rotatory power and chemical constitution. His first paper on the effect of chloroacetyl groups on the rotation of methyl and ethyl glycerates and tartrates was published in 1898, and was followed by a long series of thirty-eight communications on the influence of solvents and other factors on the rotation of optically active compounds. Those researches, which were prosecuted in elaborate detail and with great regard for accuracy, displayed at once originality and experimental skill of a high order, and gained for him the reputation of being the leading authority on this fundamental theme.

Patterson spent his vacations mainly on the Firth of Clyde, for he was an expert yachtsman, and a member of the Clyde Corinthian Club. He retired in 1942 and died in Glasgow on 14 February 1949. Elizabeth died in Hillhead in 1953. They had no children.

== Publications ==
- An International Language for Chemistry (1924)
