= William Arthur (mathematician) =

Scottish mathematician

- Born: 12 January 1894; Ayrshire, Scotland
- Died: 22 February 1979 (aged 85); Glasgow, Scotland
- Education: University of Glasgow
- Scientific career
- Fields: Mathematics
- Workplaces: University of Glasgow

William Arthur FRSE MC (12 January 1894 – 22 February 1979) was a Scottish mathematician.

== Life ==
He was born on 12 January 1894 at Fergushill near Kilwinning in Ayrshire. He studied at Queen's Park High School in Glasgow then studied Mathematics at Glasgow University graduating MA in 1915. As most, his career was interrupted by the First World War during which he served in the Welsh Guards. He won the Military Cross for his bravery.

When demobbed in 1919 he began lecturing in mathematics at Glasgow University. He rose to Senior Lecturer.

In 1921 he was elected a Fellow of the Royal Society of Edinburgh. His proposers were George Alexander Gibson, Andrew Gray, James Gordon Gray, and Robert Alexander Houston.

He retired in 1959 but then went to teach in America, at Bethany College in West Virginia 1960 to 1962.
