= Andrew Gray (physicist) =

Scottish physicist and mathematician (1847-1925)

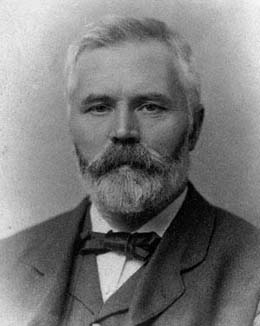
- Born: 2 July 1847; Lochgelly, Fife, Scotland
- Died: 10 October 1925 (aged 78)
- Education: Glasgow University (MA 1876, DSc, LLD(Hon) 1896)
- Known for: "Absolute Measurements in Electricity and Magnetism" (1883) "Treatise on Bessel Functions" (1895) "The Scientific Work of Lord Kelvin"
- Spouse: Annie Gordon
- Children: James Gordon Gray
- Scientific career
- Fields: Physics; Mathematics
- Workplaces: Private secretary to Sir William Thomson, Glasgow (1875–80); Secretary to Sir William Thomson, Glasgow University (1880–4); Professor of physics, University College, Bangor, Wales (1884–99); Professor of natural philosophy, Glasgow University (1899–1924)

Andrew Gray FRS FRSE (2 July 1847 – 10 October 1925) was a Scottish physicist and mathematician.

== Life ==
Born in Lochgelly, Fife, the son of John Gray, he was educated at Lochgelly School and then studied at the University of Glasgow (MA 1876), where he was appointed the Eglinton Fellow in Mathematics in 1876. Perhaps more significantly, however, in 1875 he became the assistant and private secretary of Professor William Thomson (later Lord Kelvin). He held this post – an official university one after 1880 – until 1884, when he was appointed professor of physics at the newly founded University College of North Wales.

In 1883 he was elected a Fellow of the Royal Society of Edinburgh. His proposers were Lord Kelvin, James Thomson Bottomley, and John Gray McKendrick. He served as vice-president to the society 1906 to 1909.

In June 1896 he was elected a Fellow of the Royal Society

He remained in Bangor until 1899, when he returned to Glasgow to become the professor of Natural Philosophy, succeeding Kelvin on his retirement. He held this chair for twenty-four years, stepping down in 1923, shortly before his death.

He lived on campus, his address being 11 University, Glasgow.

== Publications ==
His major scientific publications included works on electromagnetism, dynamics and Bessel functions. He also wrote a treatise on gyrostats.

His FRS candidacy form itemised the following:

- "Absolute Measurements in Electricity and Magnetism" (1889)
  - Theory and practice of absolute measurements in electricity and magnetism. Vol. 1. London: Giacomo Monti. 1893.
  - Theory and practice of absolute measurements in electricity and magnetism. Vol. 2. London: Macmillan. 1893.
- "On the Determination in Absolute Units of the Intensity of Powerful Magnetic Fields" (Phil Mag, 1883)
- "On the Dynamical Theory of Electro-magnetic Action" (ibid, 1890)
- "On the Calculation of the Induction Coefficients of Coils" (ibid, 1892)
- "On a New Reflecting Galvanometer of great sensibility, and on New Forms of Astatic Galvanometers", jointly with T Gray (Proc Roy Soc, 1884)
- "On the Relation between the Electrical Qualities and the Chemical Composition of Glass and Allied Substances", Part I, jointly with T Gray and J J Dobbie (Proc Roy Soc, 1884)
- "On the Electro-magnetic Theory of the Rotation of the Plane of Polarized Light" (Rept Brit Assoc, 1891).

Later works included:

- 1888: Diary of a cruise to Australia via Internet Archive
- 1895: (with G. B. Mathews) Treatise on Bessel Functions
- 1898: Magnetism and Electricity
- 1901: Dynamics and Property of Matter
- 1908: The Scientific Work of Lord Kelvin
- 1911: (with James Gray) Dynamics
- 1919: Treatise on Gyrostatics and Rotational Motion

== Family ==
He was married to Annie Gordon. Their four sons and four daughters included James Gordon Gray FRSE.
