= James Napier (chemist) =

Scottish industrial chemist and antiquarian

James Napier FRSE FCS
- Born: June 1810; Partick, Glasgow, Scotland
- Died: 1 December 1884; Maryfield, Bothwell, Lanarkshire, Scotland
- Education: University of Glasgow (extramural classes)
- Known for: Work in industrial chemistry; patents
- Spouse: Christina McIndoe (m. October 1831; d. 1881)
- Children: 8
- Scientific career
- Fields: Industrial chemistry

James Napier FRSE FCS (1810 – 1 December 1884) was a Scottish industrial chemist and antiquarian. He was a Fellow of the Royal Society of Edinburgh.

== Life ==
James was born in June 1810 in Partick, Glasgow the son of James Napier, a gardener, and Margaret Buchanan, a seamstress. He was apprenticed as a dyer and attended extramural classes in chemistry at Glasgow University under Prof Thomas Graham.

Napier made several important advances within industrial chemistry and lodged several patents.

He joined the Philosophical Society of Glasgow in 1849, and many of his 32 known scientific papers were presented to the Society. He was elected a Fellow of the Royal Society of Edinburgh in 1876. His proposers were James Young, George Forbes, Lord Kelvin, and John Hutton Balfour.

After his wife died in March 1881, he never fully recovered from the event, and he died at his home, Maryfield, Bothwell, Lanarkshire on 1 December 1884.

== Family ==
In October 1831 he married Christina McIndoe. They had eight children.

== Publications ==
Amongst his publications are:

- Manufacturing Art in Ancient Times
- Notes and Reminiscences of Partick
- Folk Lore or Superstitious Beliefs in the West of Scotland within This Century (1879)
