= James Gray (mathematician) =

Scottish mathematician and physicist

- Born: 1876; Glasgow, Scotland
- Died: 6 November 1934 (aged 57–58); Dowanhill, Glasgow
- Citizenship: United Kingdom
- Education: University of Glasgow (BSc Eng, DSc 1908)
- Scientific career
- Fields: Mathematics; Physics
- Workplaces: University of Glasgow

James Gordon Gray FRSE (1876 – 6 November 1934) was a Scottish mathematician and physicist.

== Life ==
Grey was born in Glasgow in 1876, the third of eight children of Annie Gordon and Andrew Gray. He was educated at Friars Grammar School, in Bangor, Caernarvonshire, Wales, where his father was employed by the university. He attended the University College of North Wales until 1899, when his father and family moved back to Glasgow.

He studied engineering at the University of Glasgow, graduating with a BScEng. From 1904, he was employed at a physics lecturer at the university, and received a doctorate (DSc) in 1908. During World War I he assisted with naval and aerial defence.

From 1920 to 1934 he was professor of applied physics at the University of Glasgow.

In 1909 he was elected a fellow of the Royal Society of Edinburgh. His proposers were his father, Andrew Gray, William Jack, Cargill Gilston Knott and George Chrystal.

He died in Dowanhill in Glasgow on 6 November 1934.

== Publications ==
- Dynamics (1911) co-written with his father
