= George Alexander Gibson =

Scottish physician, medical author and amateur geologist

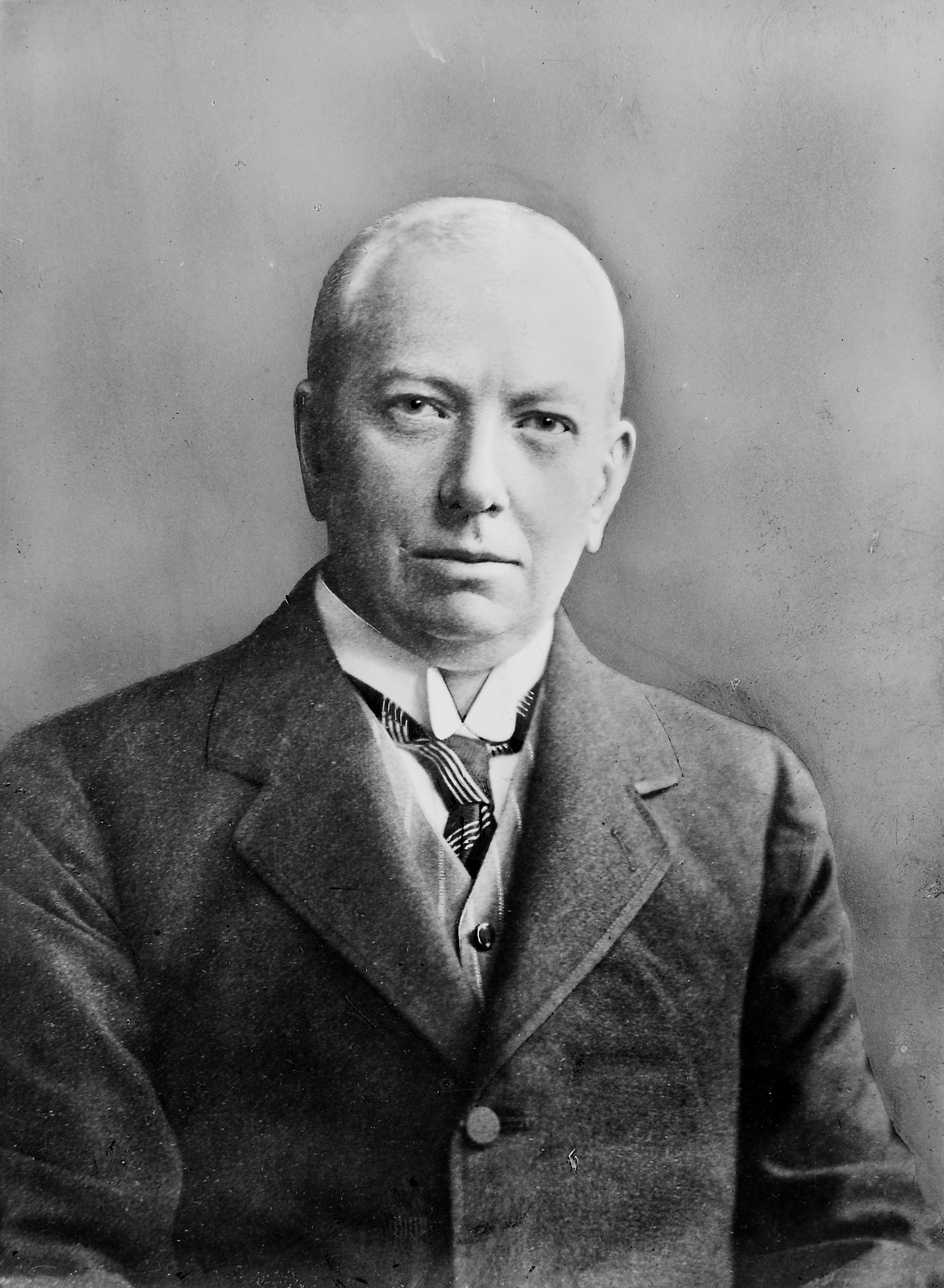
George Alexander Gibson

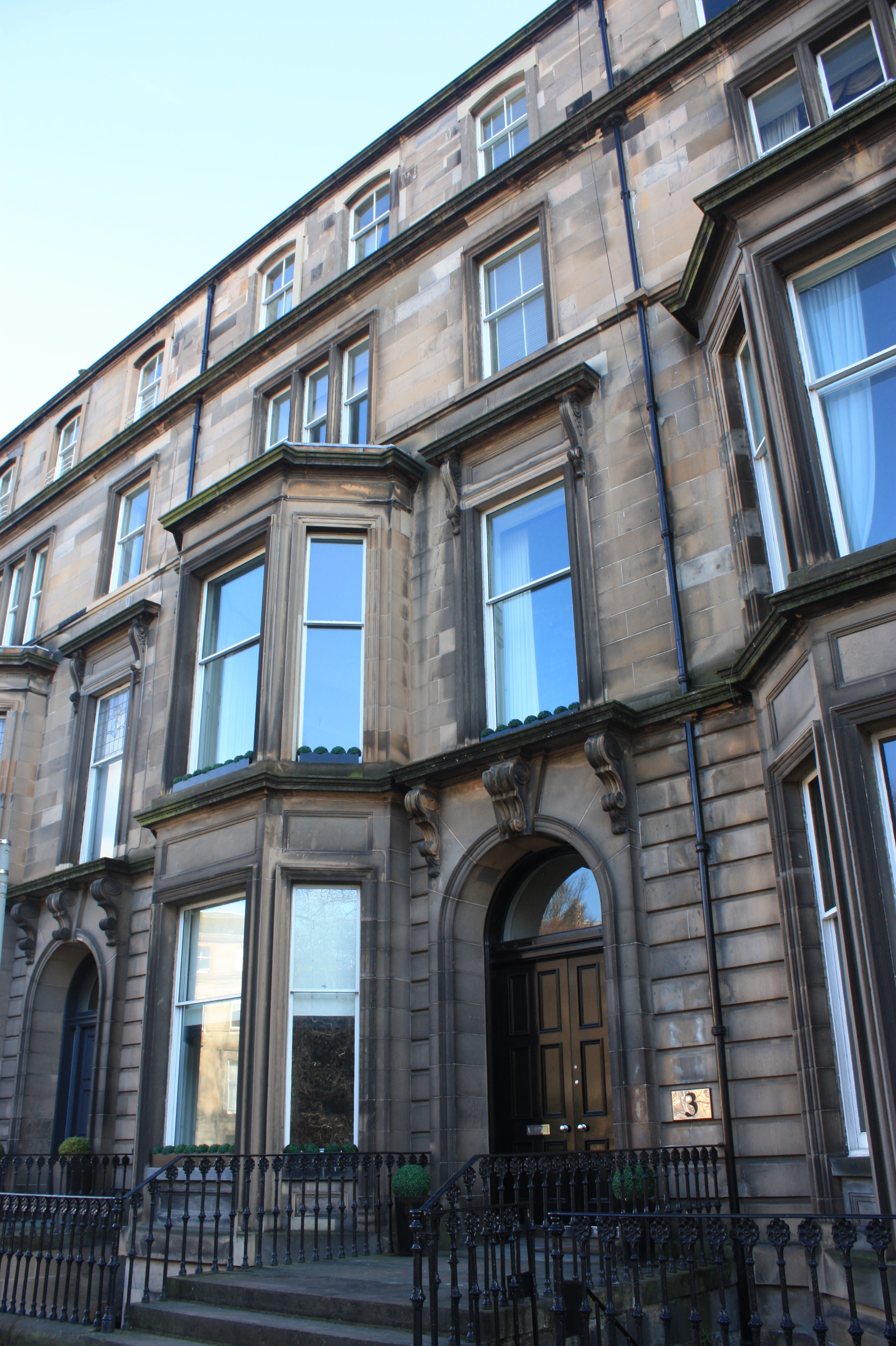
Gibson's house at 3 Drumsheugh Gardens, Edinburgh

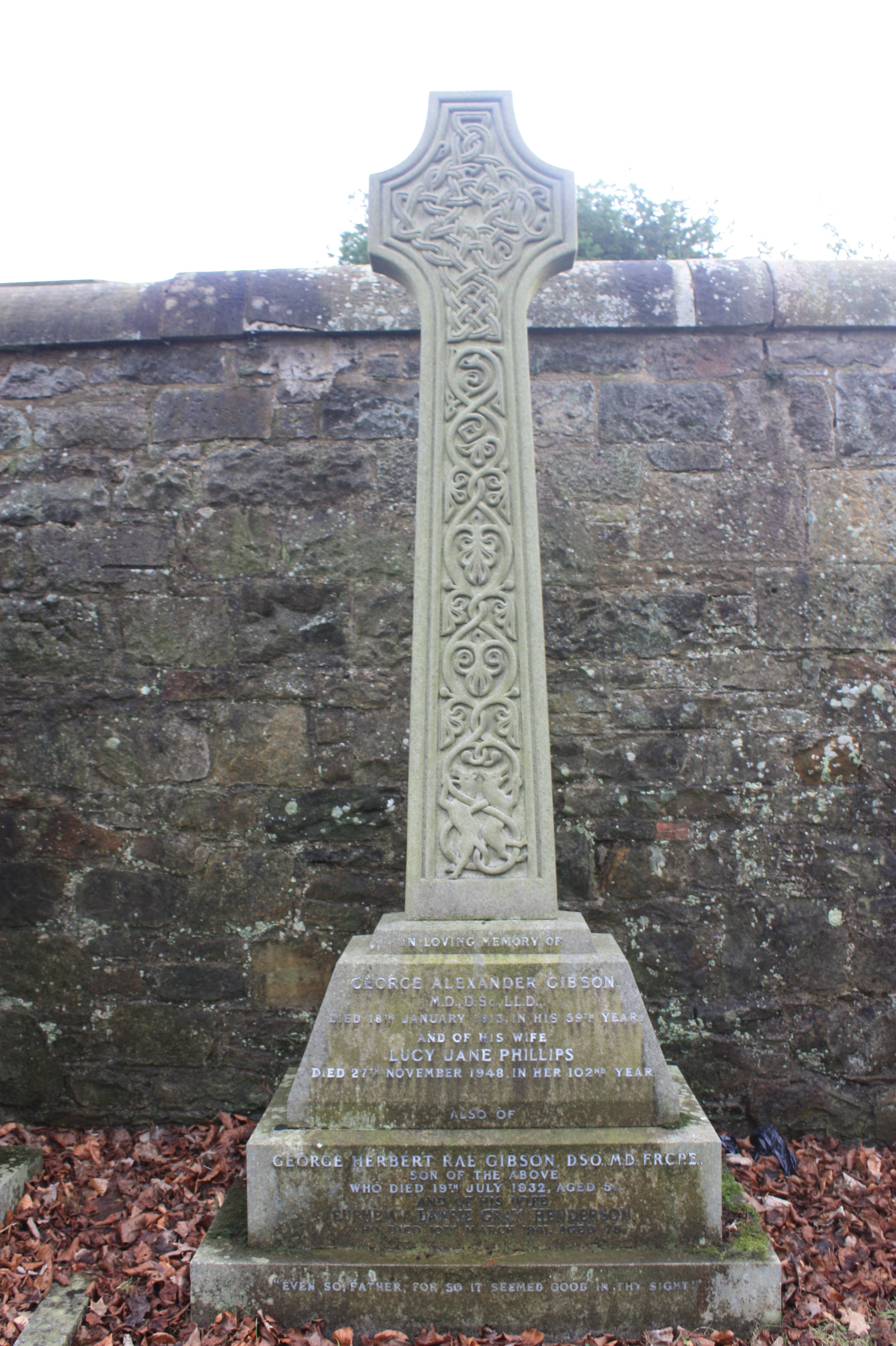
The grave of George Alexander Gibson, Dean Cemetery

George Alexander Gibson (27 January 1854 – 18 January 1913) was a Scottish physician, medical author, and amateur geologist. As an author, he wrote on the diverse fields of both geology and heart disease. The Gibson Memorial Lecture is named after him. He was the first to discover a heart condition – the Gibson Murmur – which is named after him.

== Life ==
He was born at Kelliebank in Muckhart on 27 January 1854, the son of George Gibson, a solicitor based in Alloa, and his wife Jane Rae Brown. He was educated at Dollar Academy. He then studied law at both Glasgow University and Edinburgh University but instead chose to change his study to Medicine and graduated BSc in 1874. He won the Falconer Memorial Fellowship and graduated DSc in 1877 with a thesis on the old red sandstone of Shetland. He then undertook postgraduate studies in London, Dublin and Berlin, before gaining his MD from Edinburgh University in 1881.

After a very brief spell at Birmingham General Hospital, he was appointed Senior Physician at the Royal Infirmary of Edinburgh on Lauriston Place. He also worked at the New Town Dispensary and Deaconess Hospital. He was elected a Fellow of the Royal Society of Edinburgh in 1881. His proposers were Sir William Turner, Daniel John Cunningham, Sir Archibald Geikie and Sir Charles Wyville Thomson. In 1890 he was elected a member of the Harveian Society of Edinburgh. In 1910 he was elected a member of the Aesculapian Club.

In 1912 he spoke to the AGM of the British Medical Association on non-valvular cardiac disease. In August 1912 he became a victim of cardiac disease, and his health broke. A cruise to Norway failed to revive his health. Despite complete rest, his health went further into relapse at Christmas of 1912.

He died at home, 3 Drumsheugh Gardens, in Edinburgh's fashionable West End on the morning of Saturday 18 January 1913 and is buried in Dean Cemetery in the west of the city. The grave lies in the northern extension backing onto the dividing wall to the original cemetery near its east end.

After his death a campaign in the British Medical Journal quickly resulted in the foundation of the Gibson Memorial Lecture.

== Family ==
He was married to Lucy Jane Philips (1847-1948) who lived to the age of 101.

Their son George Herbert Rae Gibson DSO FRCPE Croix de Guerre (1881-1932) followed in his father's footsteps as a doctor and was also a noted war hero. He was also the author of the noted book Maple Leaves in Flanders Field.

== Discoveries ==
Gibson Murmur, a heart condition which he first described, (Note: "Gibson murmur a long rumbling sound occupying most of systole and diastole, usually localized in the second left interspace near the sternum, and usually indicative of patent ductus arteriosus. Called also machinery murmur." "Since the invention of stethoscope by Rene Laennec, auscultation has become sine qua non of clinical examination, especially for cardiovascular system. Many clinical signs are named after the first describer, as a tribute to their efforts. So is true for cardiac murmurs. ... The machinery murmur of patent ductus arteriosus was first described by George Alexander Gibson." "in 1900, George Gibson presented a more precise description. "It persists through the second sound and dies away gradually during the long pause. The murmur is rough and trembling. It begins softly and increases in intensity so as to reach its acme just about, or immediately after, the incidence of the second sound, and from that point gradually wanes until its termination.") is named after him.

== Publications ==
- The Old Red Sandstone of Shetland (1877)
- Cheyne-Stokes Respiration (1892)
- Diseases of the Heart and Aorta (1898) Edinburgh: Young J. Pentland
- Textbook of Medicine (c.1900) (2 volumes) Edinburgh: Young J. Pentland
- Gibson and Russell's Physical Diagnosis (1902) jointly with Dr William Russell. London, Edinburgh: Young J. Pentland
- Nervous Affections of the Heart (1905) London, Edinburgh: Young J. Pentland
- Memorials of Sir William Gairdner (1911)
- Gibson contributed to the 1912 edition of the Oxford Dictionary of National Biography, the Edinburgh Medical Journal and Encyclopædia Britannica.

== Other memberships ==
- President of the Royal Medical Society 1877 aged only 23
- President of the Dyslectic Society
- Secretary of the Edinburgh branch of the British Medical Association
- Secretary of the Medico-Chirurgical Society of Edinburgh
- Secretary of the Royal College of Physicians of Edinburgh
- Director of the Town and Gown Association
- Correspondent Etranger d'Honneur de la Societe de Thirapeutique de Paris
- Member of the Royal Company of Archers, the King's official bodyguard in Scotland.
- Examiner in Clinical Medicine at both Edinburgh and Oxford Universities.
