= Holmhills Community Park Cambuslang =

Park in Cambuslang, South Lanarkshire, Scotland

Coordinates: 55.81148°N 4.174097°W

Holmhills Community Park is a recreational area in the southern part of Cambuslang, a town on the south-eastern fringes of the City of Glasgow, Scotland, UK. The area is bordered to the east by Greenlees Road (opposite the entrance to Cambuslang Park), to the south by Western Road, to the west by Langlea Road (at Cathkin High School), and to the north by Grenville Drive.

Originally the ground was owned by the Lahore family of Whitlawburn Farm in the western part and the other families who owned Holmhills Farm and Greenlees Farm to the east. These lands were used for grazing Guernsey cattle and growing barley until the mid-1960s when John Lahore sold his property to the then Lanark County Council (now South Lanarkshire Council) and moved to Montrose. Shortly afterwards the remaining two farmers also sold up so that, by the end of the 1960s, all the lands comprising the current park were owned by the local authority – most of the territory was converted into housing at Whitlawburn.

In 2016 the park was highlighted as one of the best locations in the region for a "beautiful walk to enjoy the changing season".

In 2017, decorative seating – which had been installed in the park by the local community group to allow children to explore a pond – was ruined by vandals within a week.

== Gallery ==
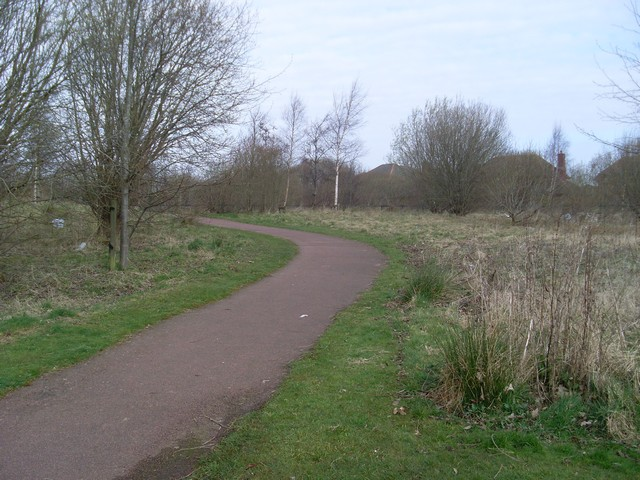
Pathway through park

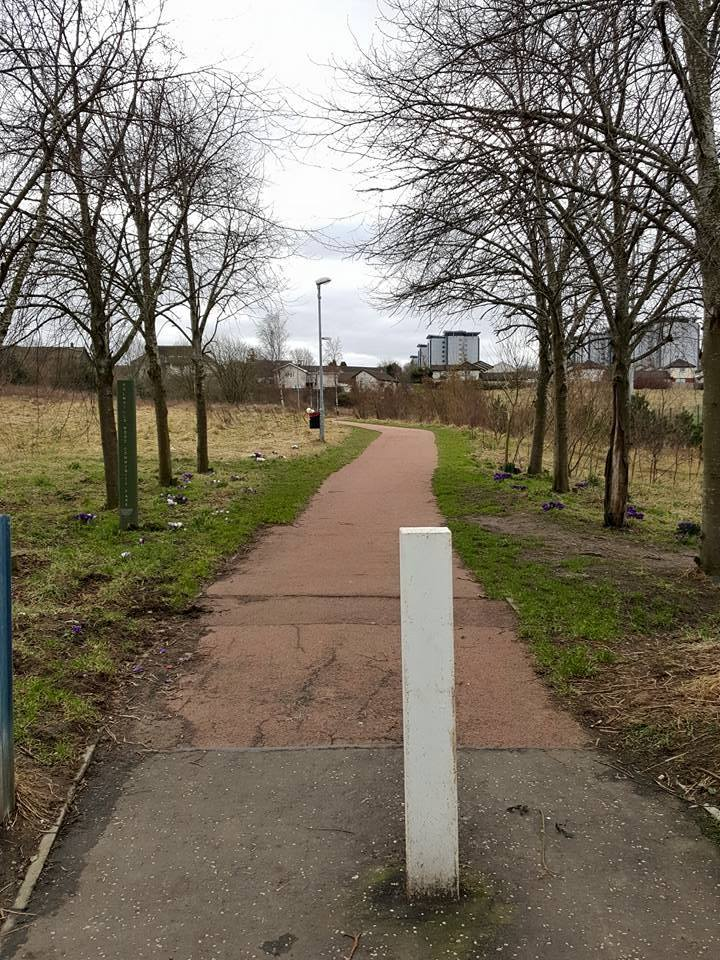
view from north entrance looking towards Whitlawburn

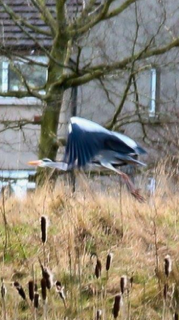
Heron in flight within park

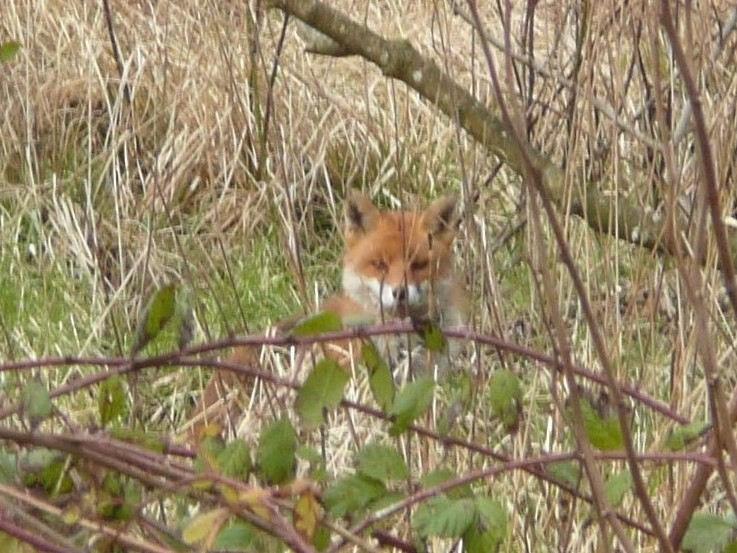
Fox in undergrowth
