= Kirkhill Golf Club =

Golf course in Cambuslang, South Lanarkshire, Scotland

Coordinates: 55.804440°N 4.173829°W

- Interactive map of Kirkhill Golf Club

Club information
- Location: Cambuslang, South Lanarkshire, Scotland
- Established: 1910
- Type: Private
- Tota holes: 18
- Tournaments: Kirkhill Pro-Am,
- Website: Kirkhill Golf Club
- Designed by: James Braid
- Par: 70
- Length: 6,010 yards (5,496 m)

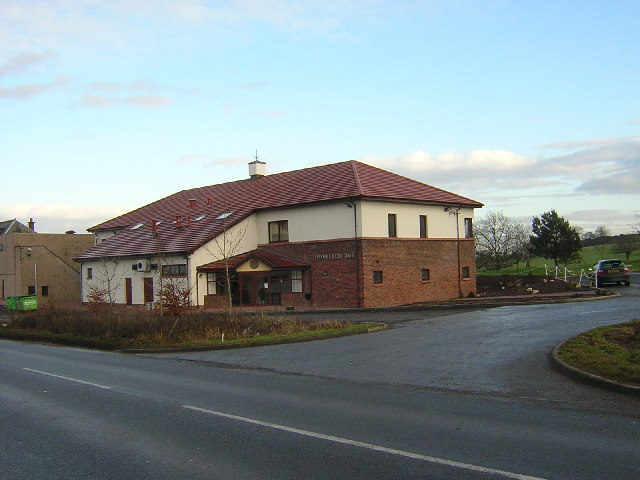
Kirkhill's clubhouse (2005)

Kirkhill Golf Club is a parkland golf course located in Cambuslang, South Lanarkshire, Scotland. The club was founded in 1910 from some former members of Cambuslang Golf Club. It is situated close to the Whitlawburn residential neighbourhood, and is adjacent to the A749 road between the southern edge of the Greater Glasgow urban area, and the town of East Kilbride located on higher ground further south; much of the course has panoramic views over the city.

The Club house was built as a dwelling house, just in case the new venture did not work out. The founders certainly had some vision, energy and only four years after the founding of the club they arranged an exhibition golf match which was held in June 1914. The legendary golfer Harry Vardon, 6 times Open champion played with George Duncan who also won the Open in 1920.
