= Whitlawburn =

Coordinates: 55.80826°N 4.180298°W

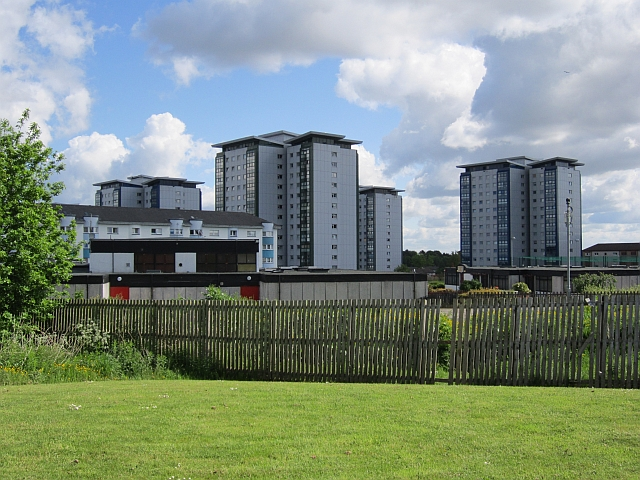
- Whitlawburn towers viewed from the south-west

- Location within Scotland Whitlawburn (Scotland)
- Population: 3,500
- OS grid reference: NS61815941
- Country: Scotland
- Sovereign state: United Kingdom
- Post town: GLASGOW
- Postcode district: G72 8
- Dialling code: 0141
- Police: Scotland
- Fire: Scottish
- Ambulance: Scottish
- UK Parliament: Rutherglen
- Scottish Parliament: Rutherglen

Whitlawburn is a residential area in the town of Cambuslang in South Lanarkshire, Scotland. It is located south of the town centre on high ground slightly north of the Cathkin Braes, overlooking the Greater Glasgow urban area.

== Location and housing ==
The majority of the housing is a local authority 'scheme' constructed in the late 1960s and early 1970s to alleviate housing shortages in the area; in particular, the tight network of poorly-appointed tenements on the north side of Cambuslang's main street was demolished wholesale and its residents decanted to new tower blocks and to the periphery of the town, echoing the events on a larger scale in the Gorbals district of neighbouring Glasgow. The territory was previously pastoral and included the Whitlawburn farm, which took its name from the Whitlaw Burn stream running down from the Cathkin Braes at the western side of the district. Private housing developments to the south of Western Road were later constructed in the late 1970s and early 1980s.

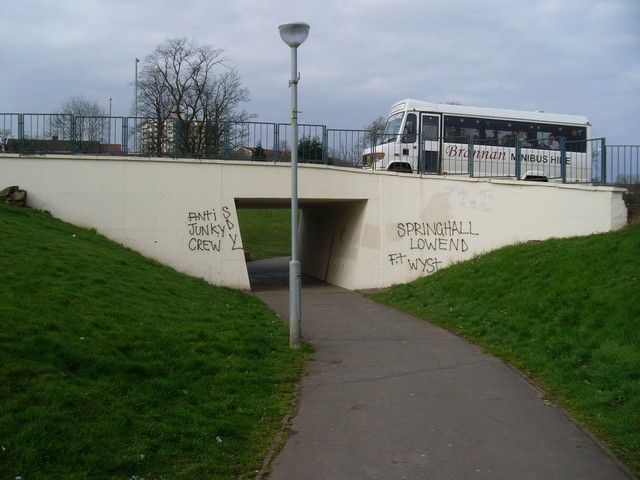
Pedestrian underpass between Springhall and Whitlawburn

A dual carriageway, part of the A749 road running from East Kilbride to Glasgow, carries a local bus route and also separates Whitlawburn from the adjacent areas of Springhall and Cathkin to the west which are part of the town of Rutherglen – however; most local amenities are shared between the three neighbourhoods. An underpass runs under the road between Springhall and Whitlawburn. To the east, a sprawling network of housing developments at Greenlees spreads out over fields towards Halfway. There is also an entrance to Cambuslang Park.

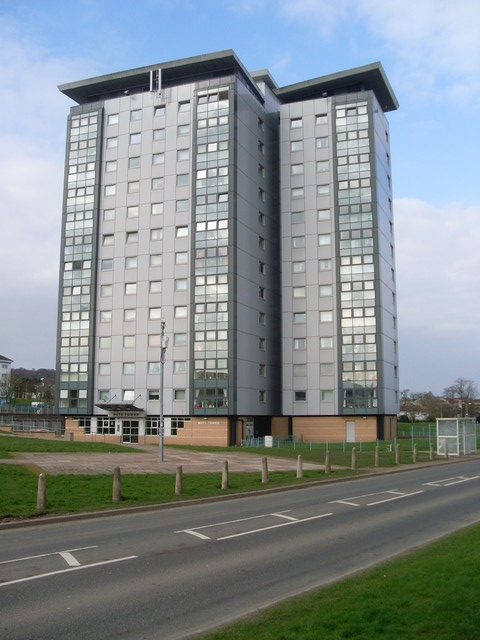
Bute Tower, one of six multi-storey blocks in the area

The Whitlawburn area itself is dominated visually by six near-identical 13-storey tower blocks constructed in 1970 (named Arran, Ailsa, Benmore, Bute, Kintore and Roslin and containing 432 apartments) on the south side of the main road through the district, with modern "Plattenbau" style tenement blocks arranged in a grid pattern to either side. A retail area was positioned at the centre of the estate - originally this was an Asda supermarket (one of the first in Scotland) which was constructed in 1975, but this site is now a (Nisa, Greggs, William Hill, soft play area, etc.). Built using the Reema method of construction (a large panel system) and originally uniformly grey concrete and brutalist in appearance, the area was regenerated from the 1990s onwards with the tenement buildings painted/rendered in brighter colours and given pitched roofs (they had originally been flat-roofed despite the frequently wet conditions in the west of Scotland) and the tower blocks fitted with cladding, roofs and ambient lighting in a £21m project.

The towers had the same original design as five others nearby (Springhall, Halfway, three in central Cambuslang), but now have an appearance very different from the others as a result of the refurbishment. In 1989, West Whitlawburn Housing Co-operative was established by residents who were unhappy with deteriorating housing conditions and out of a sense of unfairness at the tenements being prioritised. The organisation also put in place an extensive CCTV and concierge system.

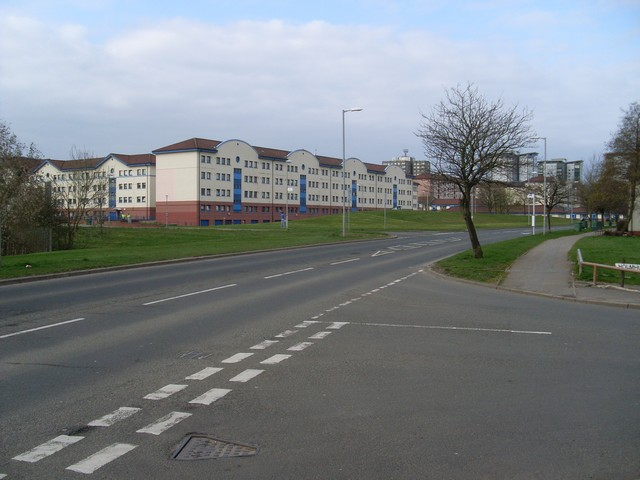
Lorne Terrace tenements in East Whitlawburn

In 2016, plans which had been in proposed some years earlier were approved to further improve the area by replacing the less popular flats in the eastern part of the scheme with new houses; this followed confirmation that parts of the district were among the most deprived communities in the country according to the 2016 Scottish index of multiple deprivation. When the East Whitlawburn Tenants Management Cooperative handed their managed properties back to council control in 2013, the datazone was in the bottom 0.5% in Scotland for deprivation. By 2019, demolition of some blocks was in progress and local construction firm CCG had drawn up plans for the replacement homes, with a planned completion date of 2021.

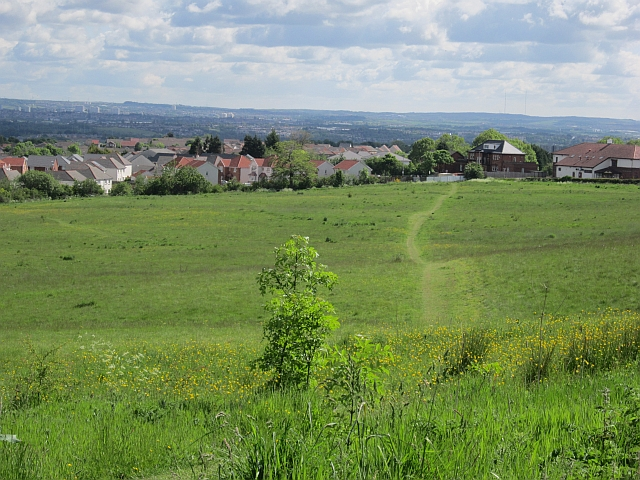
Field to the south of the neighbourhood (2012) which has since been converted into a housing development

The local community centre featuring a 5-a-side football pitch is situated to the south of the towers, as are two small 21st century housing zones: a development of large private residences with a separate vehicle entrance off the bypass road, known as Lomond View, and a group of 100 modest houses built by West Whitlawburn Housing Co-operative accessed from the main road. These properties back onto farmland and a golf course (Kirkhill Golf Club) which are part of the green belt at the edge of the Glasgow urban area. However, in 2016 a planning application by Persimmon for 240 new houses in a vacant field (accessed via the road passing the golf club) was approved for construction, despite some concerns regarding possible flooding and school provision. With the development nearing completion in late 2019, residents were surprised to find that their streets were still within the boundaries of the East Kilbride constituency for the 2019 United Kingdom general election, as had been the case before its construction when the land was a field and therefore of little consequence in that context.

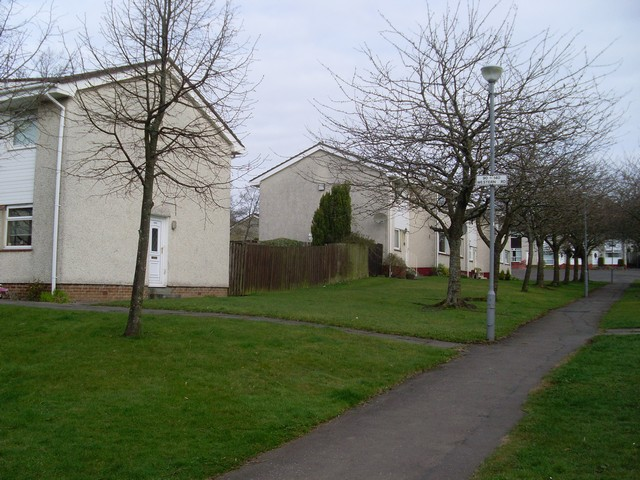
cottage flats off Western Road

On the north side of the road is a system of terraced houses and cottage flats with common parking areas, as well as the local public house, the new buildings of Cathkin High School, a further group of small houses built on the school's previous site (Cathkin Rise by Barratt), and Holmhills Park which leads to the Kirkhill residential area to the north. Coats Park, the ground of Cambuslang Rugby Club, is also nearby.

== Amenities ==
Administratively, Whitlawburn lies within the Cambuslang West ward of the South Lanarkshire Council area which is also the extent of the neighbourhood community policing zone. The nearest train stations are Burnside and Kirkhill which are both approximately 1 mile from the western end of the district.

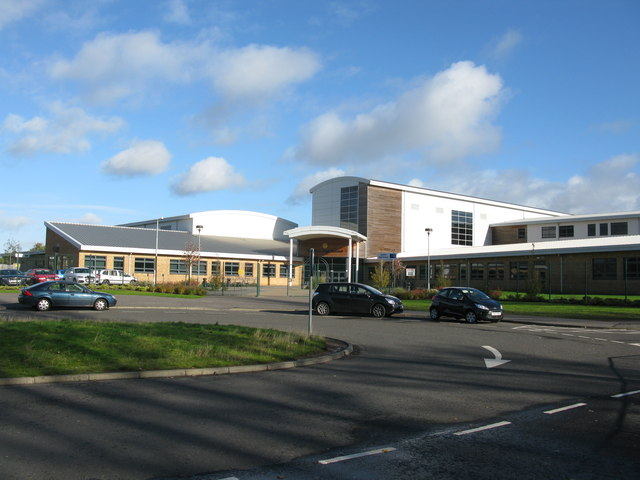
the new Cathkin High School is situated to the north of Whitlawburn; the original was on the main road within the neighbourhood

The closest schools for younger children are Loch Primary and St Anthony's RC Primary (both in Springhall – the schools are built on adjacent sites, a common occurrence in Scotland, and nowadays share a playground) and West Coats Primary (Kirkhill); however, children living in the new Persimmon development will attend Cairns Primary in Halfway due to capacity issues. For older children, nondenominational Cathkin High School (which also houses a nursery and Rutherglen High School, an additional support needs facility) is on the doorstep of Whitlawburn, but Catholic students have to make their way to Eastfield to attend Trinity High. A standalone pre-school facility, Springlaw ELC (intentionally named after both communities as a gesture of unity) was built on a piece of vacant land in Springhall, opening in 2021.

== Notable residents ==
- Darren Young, footballer (Aberdeen F.C., Dunfermline Athletic, Scotland u21) and manager (Albion Rovers)
- Derek Young, footballer (also Aberdeen, Dunfermline and Scotland u21 plus Partick Thistle), brother of Darren
