= Hugh McIver =

Scottish recipient of the Victoria Cross

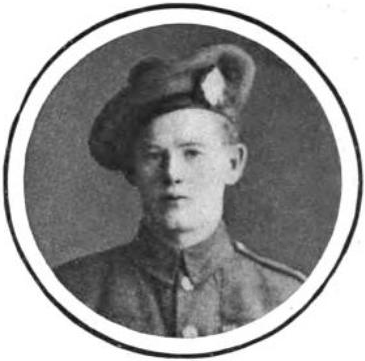
- Born: 21 June 1890; Linwood, Renfrewshire, Scotland
- Died: 2 September 1918 (aged 28); Courcelles, France
- Burial place: Vraucourt Copse Cemetery, Vaulx-Vraucourt
- Military career
- Allegiance: United Kingdom
- Branch: British Army
- Rank: Private
- Units: Royal Scots
- Conflicts: World War I †
- Awards: Victoria Cross; Military Medal & Bar

Hugh McIver VC MM & Bar (21 June 1890 – 2 September 1918) was a Scottish recipient of the Victoria Cross, the highest and most prestigious award for gallantry in the face of the enemy that can be awarded to British and Commonwealth forces.

He was 28 years old, and a private in the 2nd Battalion, The Royal Scots (The Lothian Regiment), British Army during the First World War.

Private McIver was employed as a company-runner during the conflict. On 23 August 1918, east of Courcelles-le-Comte, France, disregarding his own safety he carried messages under heavy artillery and machine-gun fire. He pursued an enemy scout into a machine-gun post, killed six of the garrison, captured twenty prisoners, and secured two machine-guns. Later he succeeded in stopping the fire of a British tank which was directed in error against the British Army's own troops. He was killed in action ten days later near Courcelles, France, on 2 September 1918.

His Victoria Cross is displayed at the Royal Scots Museum, Edinburgh Castle, Scotland.

Born in Linwood, Renfrewshire, he spent much of his life in Newton (Cambuslang) and is commemorated in both towns.

== Bibliography ==
- Gliddon, Gerald (2014) [2002]. Road to Victory 1918. VCs of the First World War. The History Press. ISBN 978-0750953610.
- Scotland's Forgotten Valour (Graham Ross, 1995)
