= West Whitlawburn Housing Co-operative =

Co-operative social housing provider in Cambuslang, South Lanarkshire, Scotland

Coordinates: 55.8079°N 4.1806°W

West Whitlawburn Housing Co-operative Limited
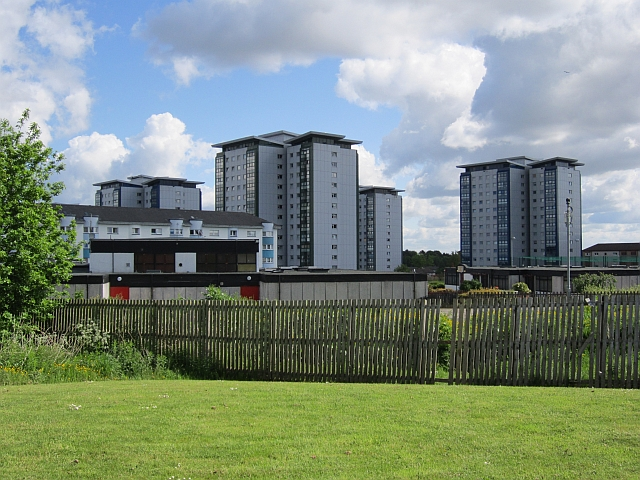
- Some of the blocks of flats on the estate
- Company type: Housing co-operative
- Founded: February 1989
- Key people: Paul Farrell (director); Anne Anderson (chair)
- Revenue: £4,644,342 (2020)
- Net income: £555,915 (2020)
- Total assets: £40,500,800 (2020)
- Members: 681 (2020)
- Number of employees: 36 (2020)
- Website: wwhc.org.uk

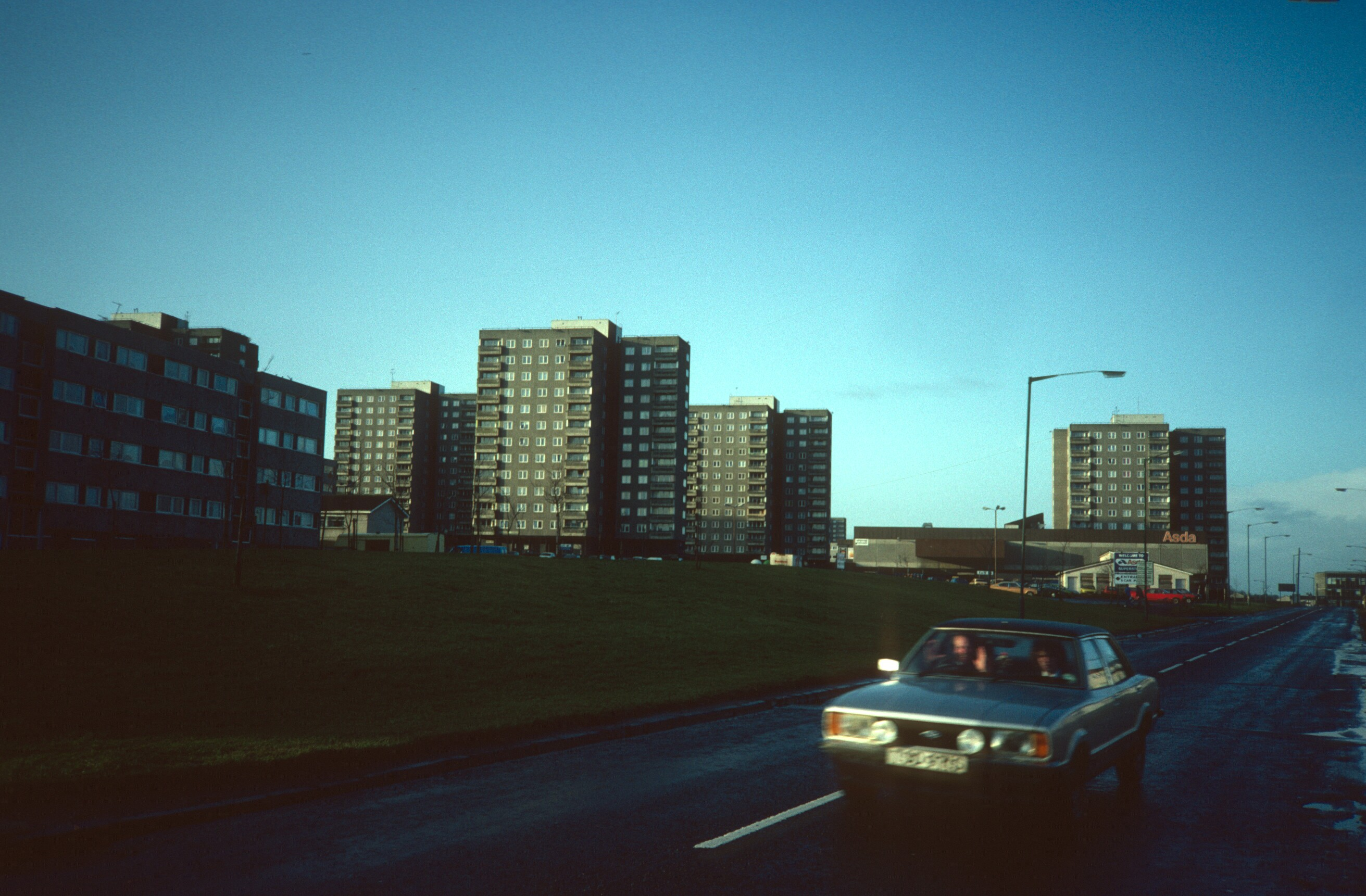
The West Whilawburn estate in 1988.

West Whitlawburn Housing Co-operative is a housing co-operative and registered social landlord on the outskirts of Glasgow, Scotland. Situated in Cambuslang the co-operative is a social housing provider managing 644 former council housing on the West Whitlawburn estate, housing approximately 2500 residents. As a fully mutual housing co-operative the tenants are members and shareholders and elect a management committee of members to oversee the running of the organisation. Founded in 1989 the co-operative is one of the largest housing co-operatives in Scotland, and one of the few stock transfer social housing co-operatives not to have been converted into a housing association.

== History ==
The estate was originally developed at the end of the 1960s by Lanark County Council as one of Glasgow's many new peripheral estates. Construction of the six present-day tower blocks was completed in 1970 with a total of 432 flats. The 13-storey pre-fabricated concrete towers blocks were built by Reema Scotland at a total cost of £1.25m. The newly built estate also included a number of low-rise blocks of flats.

As with many post-war tower blocks the development was initially lauded, with the developers extolling the aesthetics of the towers, the internal features, and the communal laundry.

However, by the 1980s tenants were dissatisfied with the management and upkeep of the properties by the Council alongside issues of crime and drug abuse. Frustrated by the perceived inaction of the council, in 1989 tenants formed a housing co-operative and through the stock transfer process took on the ownership and management of the estate.

In 1996 the co-operative established a community centre on the estate. In 2005 the co-operative became a fully mutual co-operative and a registered charity. As a registered social housing provider the co-operative is regulated by the Scottish Housing Regulator.

In 2008 the co-operative established Whitcomm Co-operative a separate consumer co-operative to provide fibre-optic broadband connections to members of the housing co-operative on a not-for-profit basis. As a consumer co-operative Whitcomm is similarly owned and governed by its customers.

In addition to the original blocks of flats the co-operative has also built an additional 100 low-rise flats on the estate.

To try and address concerns about fuel poverty the co-operative installed a district heating system using a 740 kW woodchip biomass boiler to provide hot water and heating to the properties.
