= Stonegrove Estate =

Housing estate in London

Stonegrove and Spur Road Estate
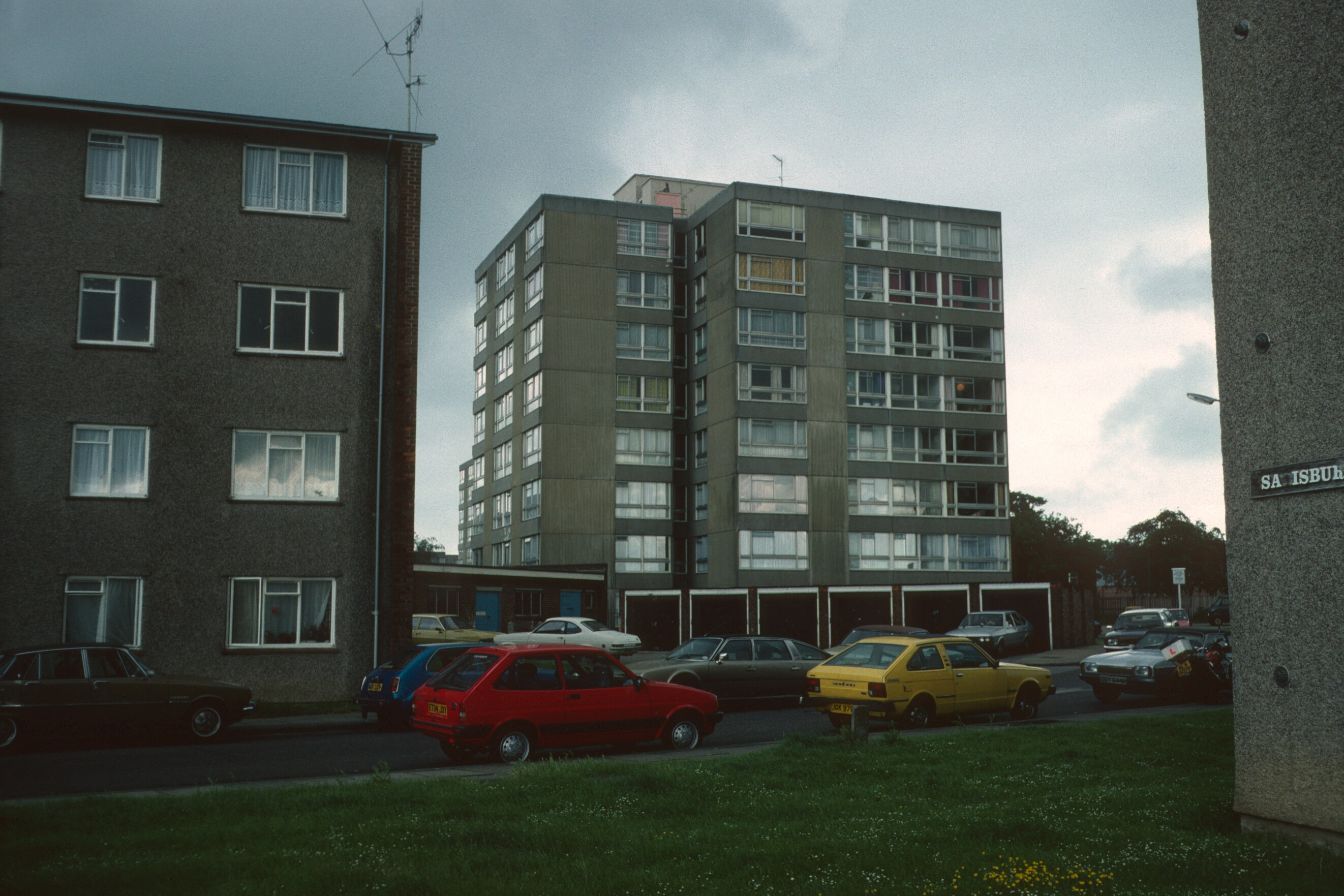
- Interactive map of Stonegrove and Spur Road Estate

General information
- Location: Edgware
- Coordinates: 51.620833°N 0.287778°W
- Area: London
- No. of units: 630

Construction
- Constructed: 1960s-70s
- Style: Modernist

Listing
- Demolished: 2018

Other information
- Governing body: Barnet Council

The Stonegrove and Spur Road Estate was a housing estate in Edgware situated on the edge of the green belt at the very northern edge of the London Borough of Barnet, close to Stanmore tube station and adjoining the London Borough of Harrow. The estate was built in the 60s and 70s, and were a mixture of 11-storey tower blocks and four-storey maisonette blocks.

== Stonegrove today ==
The estate was made up of 603 homes with a combination of one to three bedroom flats and maisonettes distributed across medium and low rise blocks. Stonegrove was surrounded by traditional suburban housing to the east, west and south, and to the north lies the green belt. The estate exhibited many of the issues associated with postwar public housing including poor access and parking arrangements.

== Regeneration plan ==
Due to the poor state of repair of the buildings and their high energy costs the Borough of Barnet resolved to regenerate the estate. All 603 properties were demolished and will be replaced (by 2018) with 937 new homes, with about a third for rent, half for sale and the remainder for low-cost home ownership. The aim of the regeneration is to provide new high quality suburban homes to meet the Decent Homes Standard and improve the estate's neighbourhood in keeping with its location on the edge of greenbelt countryside.

Barratt Homes, in partnership with the London Borough of Barnet and Family Mosaic Housing Association, appointed Sprunt to act as executive architects to develop a master plan for the regeneration.

St Peter's Community Church, Church Hall, Parsonage and Community Centre will also be demolished and replaced. There will be new roads and open spaces, improved parking provision and improvements will also be made to the important junction between Spur Road and Green Lanes.

== Olympics ==
Darwin Bernardo, a youth worker from 'Stonegrove Estates youth project', which is run out of St Peter's Community Church on the Stonegrove Estate, was chosen to carry the Olympic torch through Barnet to mark the start of the London 2012 Olympic Games.
