= Stock transfer =

Stock transfer may be:

- Stock transfer agent, an individual or organisation involved in transferring the name and certificate of one master shareholder of stock to another.
- Stock transfer (housing), the process in which ownership of council housing is transferred to a housing association.
- Empty stock transfer, the act of moving rolling stock from one destination to another without carrying passengers or freight
