= Routes To Work South =

Scottish welfare-to-work subcontractor

Routes to Work South is a welfare-to-work subcontractor based in South Lanarkshire, Scotland. South Lanarkshire residents are often referred to the organisation by their local Job Centre, but individuals are also 'encouraged' to contact it themselves. Routes To Work South has offices in Cambuslang, East Kilbride, Hamilton and Lanark.

== Current projects ==
The company has many different 'bespoke' welfare-to-work programmes operating within the framework of those of the DWP including South Lanarkshire Jobs Fund, Making it Work, Job Brokers, Employability, and Employer Service Consultants.
