= John McWhan =

John McWhan FRSE (1885-1943) was a Scottish mathematician and academic. His academic range included electrical engineering.

== Life ==
He was born in Cambuslang on 22 January 1885 the son of Maggie and John McWhan, headmaster of the local school. He was educated at Whitehill Secondary School in Glasgow. He won a bursary and then studied Mathematics and Natural Philosophy (Physics) at Glasgow University graduating MA in 1907. He then went under a further scholarship to the University of Göttingen under Carl Runge where he gained a doctorate (PhD) in 1910.

In 1910 he returned to Glasgow University as an Assistant Lecturer in Mathematics, becoming a lecturer in 1913 and continued in this role until death. He was elected a Fellow of the Royal Society of Edinburgh in 1921. His proposers were George Alexander Gibson, Andrew Gray, Robert Alexander Houston and James Gordon Gray.

He died at 37 Airthrey Avenue in Jordanhill, in Glasgow on 14 July 1943.

== Family ==
In 1926 he married Winifred Stevens. They had one son.
