= Cambuslang Park =

Park in Cambuslang, Scotland

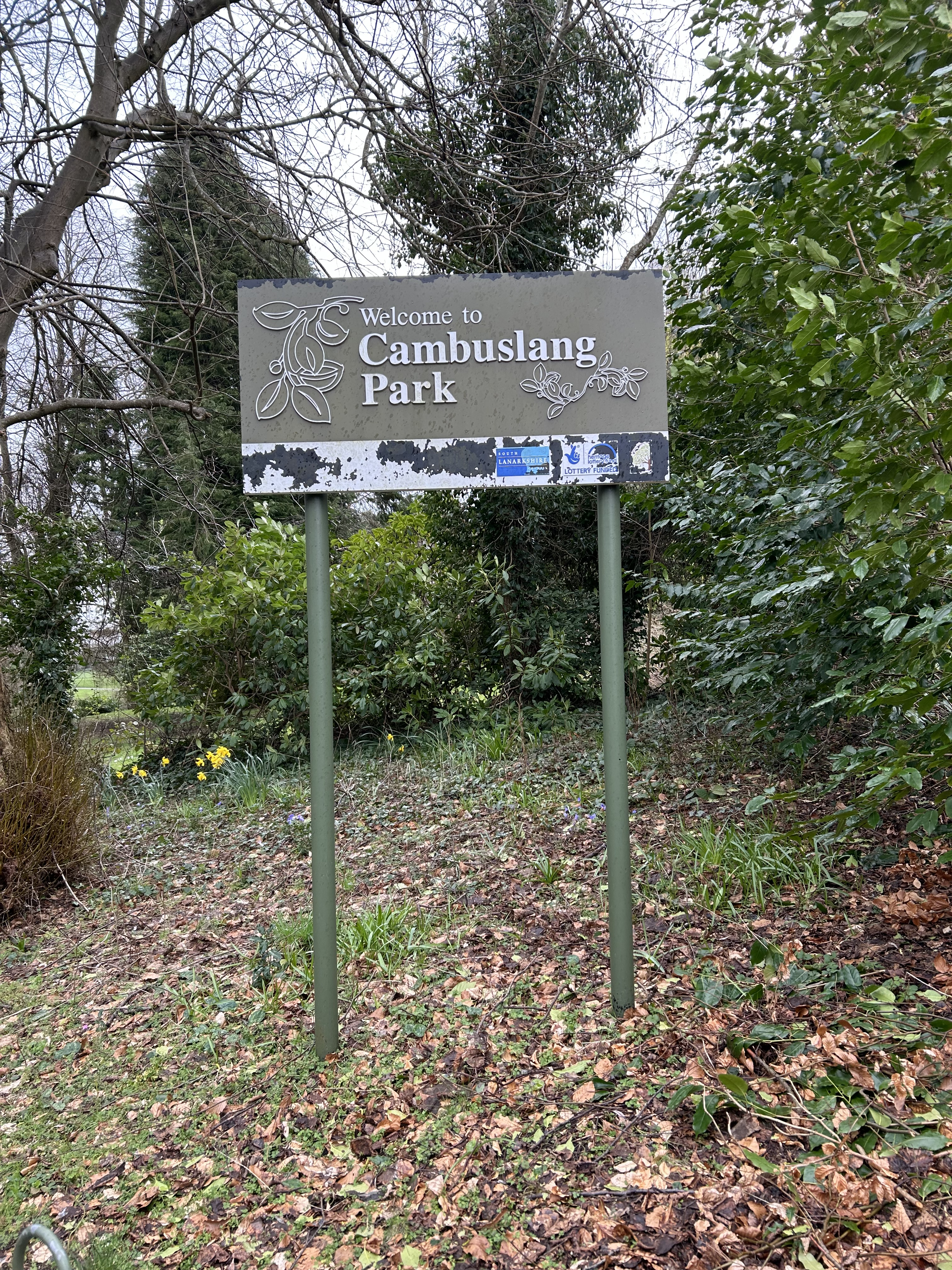
- Interactive map of Cambuslang Park
- Type: Public park
- Location: Cairns Road, Cambuslang, Scotland G72 8PZ
- Coordinates: 55.8112°N 4.1617°W
- Area: 27 hectares (67 acres)
- Operator: South Lanarkshire Council
- Open: Open all year

Cambuslang Park is a green flag awarded public park located in Cambuslang, part of the Greater Glasgow area, Scotland. The park spans 27-hectare (67-acre) and features floral displays, an amphitheatre, and a comprehensive network of pathways for walking. It features open parklands contrasted by the Borgie Glen, a steep tree-lined ravine.

== Current usage ==
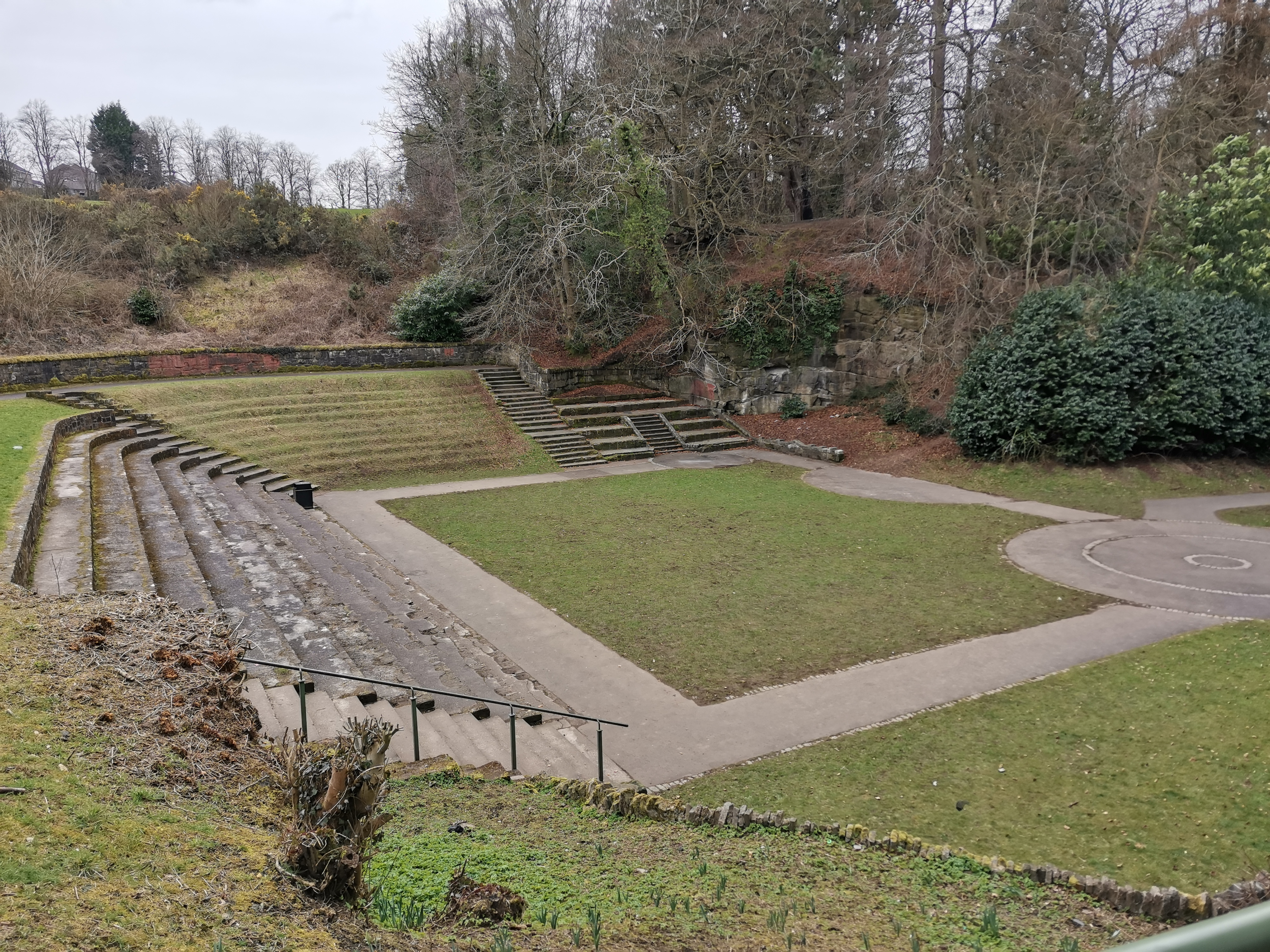
The park's amphitheatre

Cambuslang Public Park is renowned for its unique natural amphitheatre and varied ecological features, including a pond and extensive woodland areas which are home to rare species. The Borgie Glen, a notable feature within the park, contains a complex network of pathways. The bandstand area, serving as a natural amphitheatre, is particularly noted for its uniqueness.

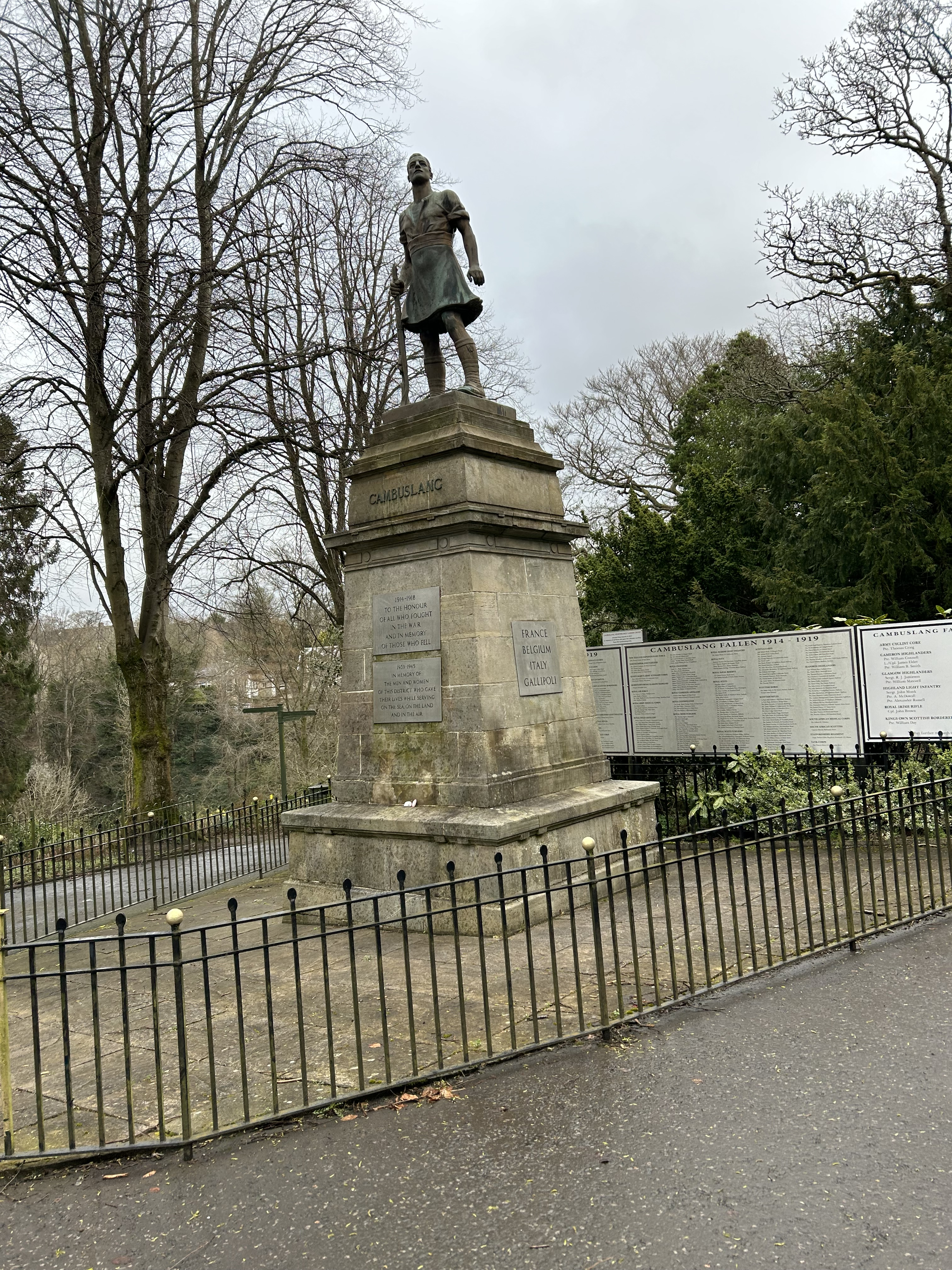
Cambuslang War Memorial

The town's war memorial is located within the park: this features a bronze statue of a kilted soldier (sculptor Alexander Proudfoot, unveiled 1922) – it is said to depict John McAlpine, the first man from Cambuslang killed in the First World War Local activists have researched the details of every local serviceman killed in the 1914–1918 and 1939–1945 conflicts (including Victoria Cross recipient Hugh McIver), which are displayed on plaques behind the statue. Due to the park being somewhat isolated from the town centre, an additional Remembrance Garden was installed at the east end of Cambuslang Main Street in the 2010s.

Other installations include a line of 18 oak trees (two each representing local schools) planted in 1937 to mark the Coronation of George VI, a small cairn at the 'Preaching Braes' erected in 2008 to commemorate the Cambuslang Work (an important religious revival event which took place there in the mid-18th century), and an inscribed boulder marking the centenary of the park in 2013.

By 2023 the park had received ten consecutive Green Flag Awards ("the benchmark for clean, safe and well-maintained parks and green spaces") on the back of refurbishments carried out following a National Lottery grant of £550,000 in 2010.

== Facilities ==
The park offers a large, accessible play area that caters to toddlers and juniors, providing varied play experiences plus an outdoor gym. The park contains three grass football pitches and a Multi-Use Games Area (MUGA), which supports a variety of sports activities.

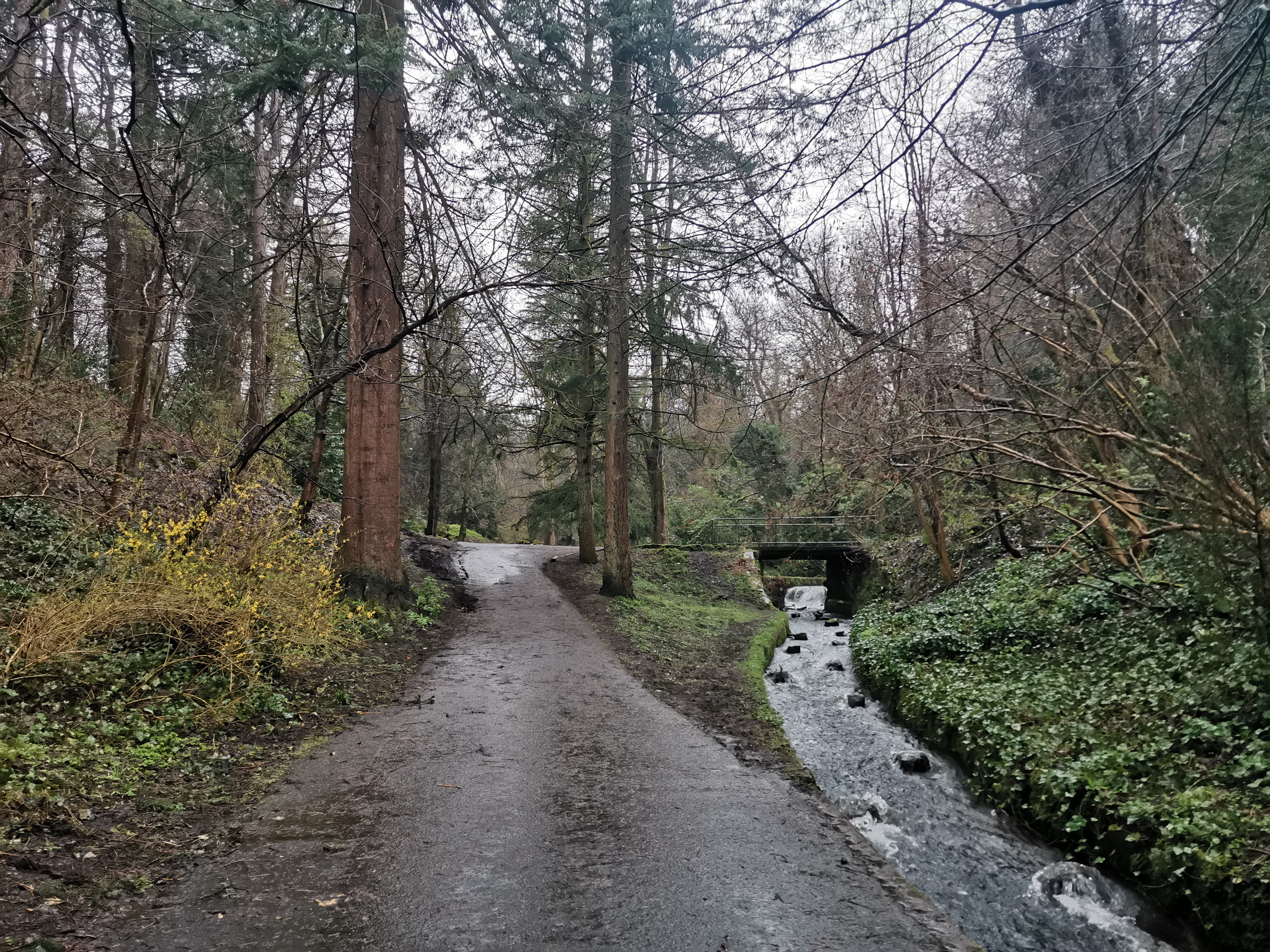
Part of the Borgie Glen section

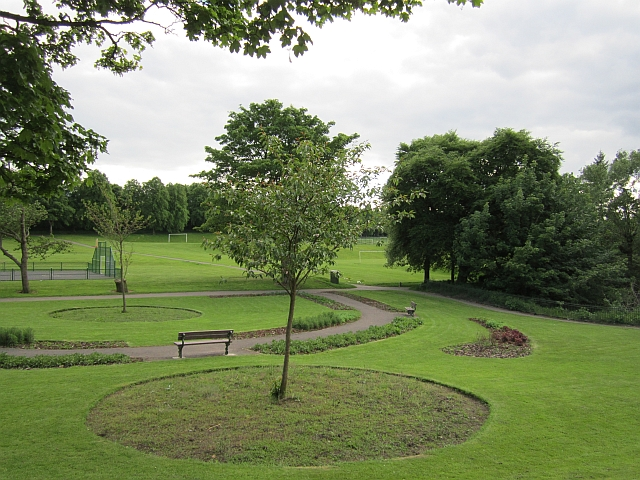
The open side of the park viewed from Cairns Road (flowerbeds in foreground)

Described as being in four sections, the landscape can be divided broadly into just two: the west side accommodates the inclined and wooded Borgie Glen, the burn of which flows northwards to a small pond, while on the north side a similar burn emerges from a culvert and flows westwards in a similar wooded setting towards the same pond; the east and south section is comparatively flat, open and grassed and includes the flowerbed area, playpark and football pitches. The amphitheatre, which is at the geographical centre of the park, takes up part of the difference in elevation between the grassed area and the pond area, with the natural sloping cliff adapted into nine concrete stepped rows forming a 'V' shape.

The main water course, part of the Kirk Burn which forms at west side of Dechmont Hill and eventually flows into the River Clyde near the Clydeford Bridge (A763), is enclosed in a stone-lined channel to prevent flooding, with a number of small ponds, weirs and footbridges as both the burn and path wind their way downhill through the gorge, which includes some cliff faces. Beyond the pond and Preaching Braes cairn is another incline forming a natural boundary to the glen, with the grounds of Cambuslang Old Parish Church situated at its head and the burn culverted below. At this point a short section of railway (Cathcart Circle Lines Newton branch) is also visible before it enters a tunnel turning north-east. A separate section of the Borgie Glen continues further north, but in an overgrown untended and dangerous condition in the 21st century.

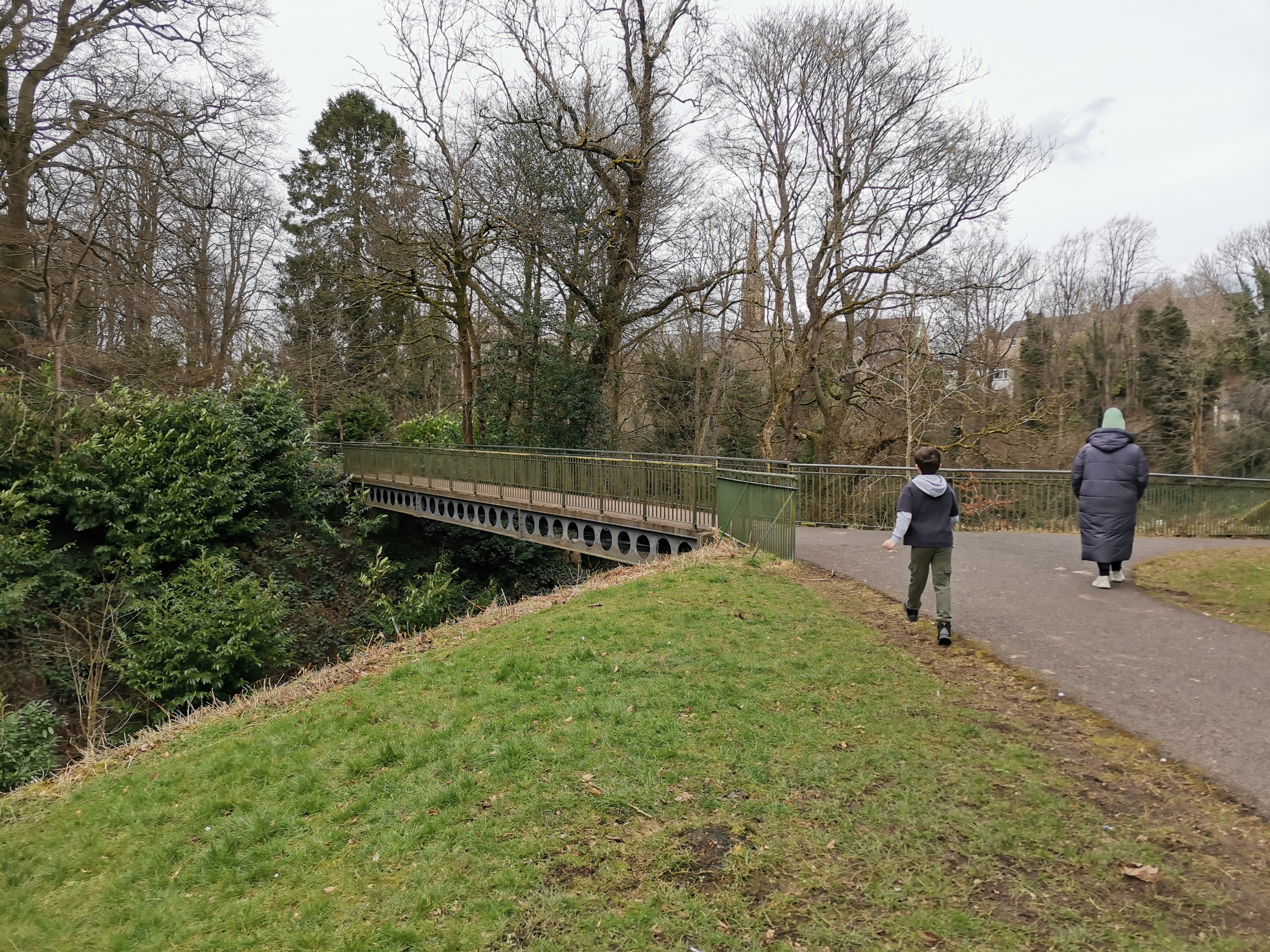
A footbridge links the two sides of the glen

The park has three primary entrances: Greenlees Road (south-west corner at the top of the glen, close to the Whitlawburn neighbourhood), Mansefield Avenue (north-west near the war memorial, close to Kirkhill railway station) and Cairns Road (north-east near the playpark, close to the Halfway neighbourhood). Most of the main pathways facilitate easy access for those with mobility issues, with a metal footbridge across the glen providing a route from the north-west to north-east at almost the same elevation, and paths off this route arranged in gradual descents to the lower pond area. However, although the path from the south-west is a smooth and well-maintained surface without stairs, its incline may prove a challenge to some visitors in places. There are several secondary entrances at various locations around the perimeter, but the majority involve a combination of a steep descent to the main paths, uneven/loose surfaces and/or steps. All major paths and areas of the park can be explored via a circuitous route of around 2.4 kilometres (1.5 miles).

There are no formal car parking facilities. Typically, spaces can be found in the residential streets a short distance from the entrances.

== Community involvement ==
Local community groups are highly active in the maintenance and enhancement of the park, organising clean-ups and community events. The park is also a focal point for local wildlife conservation efforts, with designated areas to support urban biodiversity.
