= J. B. Lockhart =

Scottish mathematician and teacher

James Balfour Lockhart FRSE (1886–27 January 1969) was a Scottish mathematician and teacher. He was generally known as J. B. Lockhart or simply JBL. He was a Fellow of the Royal Society of Edinburgh.

== Life ==
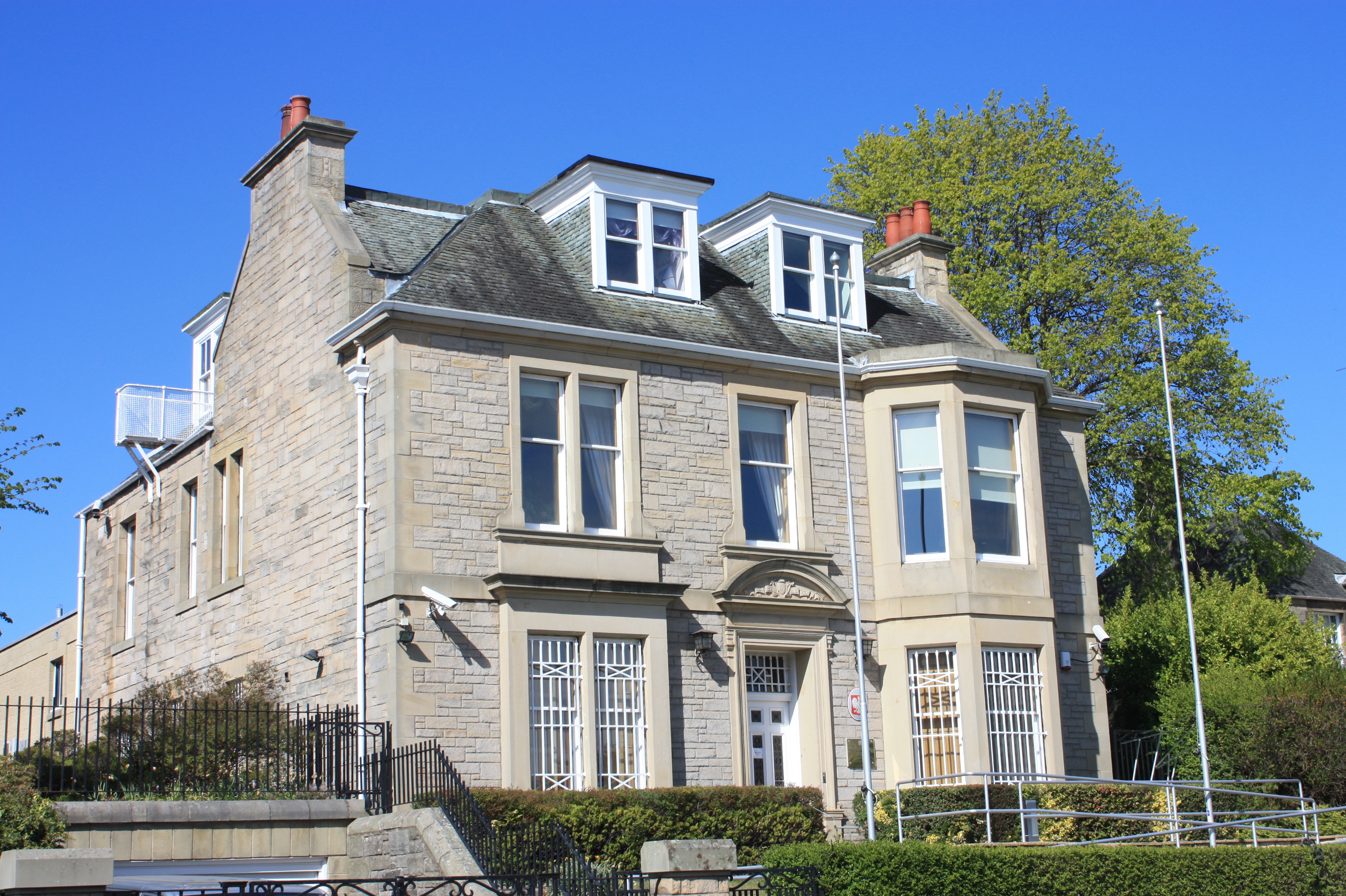
2 Kinnear Road, Edinburgh

He was born in Cambuslang in 1886. He was educated locally then studied for the civil service at Skerry's College in Glasgow. In 1912 he decided to start studying mathematics and natural philosophy (physics) at the University of Edinburgh. His studies were interrupted by the First World War, during which he served in Egypt and Gallipoli. He appears to have been a Private in the Royal Army Medical Corps. Returning to university after the war he graduated with first class honours also receiving the Napier Medal for best mathematician in 1920. After graduation he decided to stay in Edinburgh and began teaching at Edinburgh Academy. In 1930 he became house-master of Dundas House, a boarding facility for the academy at 2 Kinnear Road. In 1932 he was elected a Fellow of the Royal Society of Edinburgh. His proposers were Sir Edmund Taylor Whittaker, Herbert Turnbull, Charles Barkla and Sir Charles Galton Darwin.

In 1937 he moved to Inverleith Grove, and in 1940 took over as Head of Mathematics. In October 1950 he fell ill and in 1951 was forced to retire due to a heart condition. He died of complications following an operation on a broken leg in Glenfarg Hospital on 27 January 1969. His wife died in July of the same year.

== Family ==
He was happily married to Adie, whom he had met as a student at Skerrys College. Holidays were spent at his cottage in Kingskettle in Fife. On his retirement they moved to Balmony, a cottage in Glendevon in southern Perthshire (now part of Clackmannanshire). His hobbies included bee-keeping.
