= Rutherglen High School =

Location
- Cambuslang, South Lanarkshire, G72 8ES; Scotland; 55.81288°N 4.181950°W

Information
- Motto: Respect, Happy, Safe
- Established: 1999
- Authority: South Lanarkshire Council
- Head teacher: Richard Millar
- Scottish Highers: 1st Year (11/12) – 6th Year (16/17)
- Gender: Mixed
- Enrollment: 90
- Colors: Dark blue, dark green, black
- Website: www.rutherglen.s-lanark.sch.uk

Rutherglen High School is a non-denominational, co-educational secondary school in Cambuslang, South Lanarkshire, Scotland, for pupils with additional support needs.

The school was established in August 1999 and has shared a campus with Cathkin High School in the neighbourhood of Whitlawburn since the opening of new buildings in October 2008; prior to this, it occupied the vacated annexe of Stonelaw High School (originally Gallowflat School) in central Rutherglen, about 1.5 miles (2.4 km) further north, with the relocation met with opposition by some parents and board members due to the anticipated disruption to the pupils' routines. A nursing home now occupies the Rutherglen site.
