= Courcelles-le-Comte =

- Commune
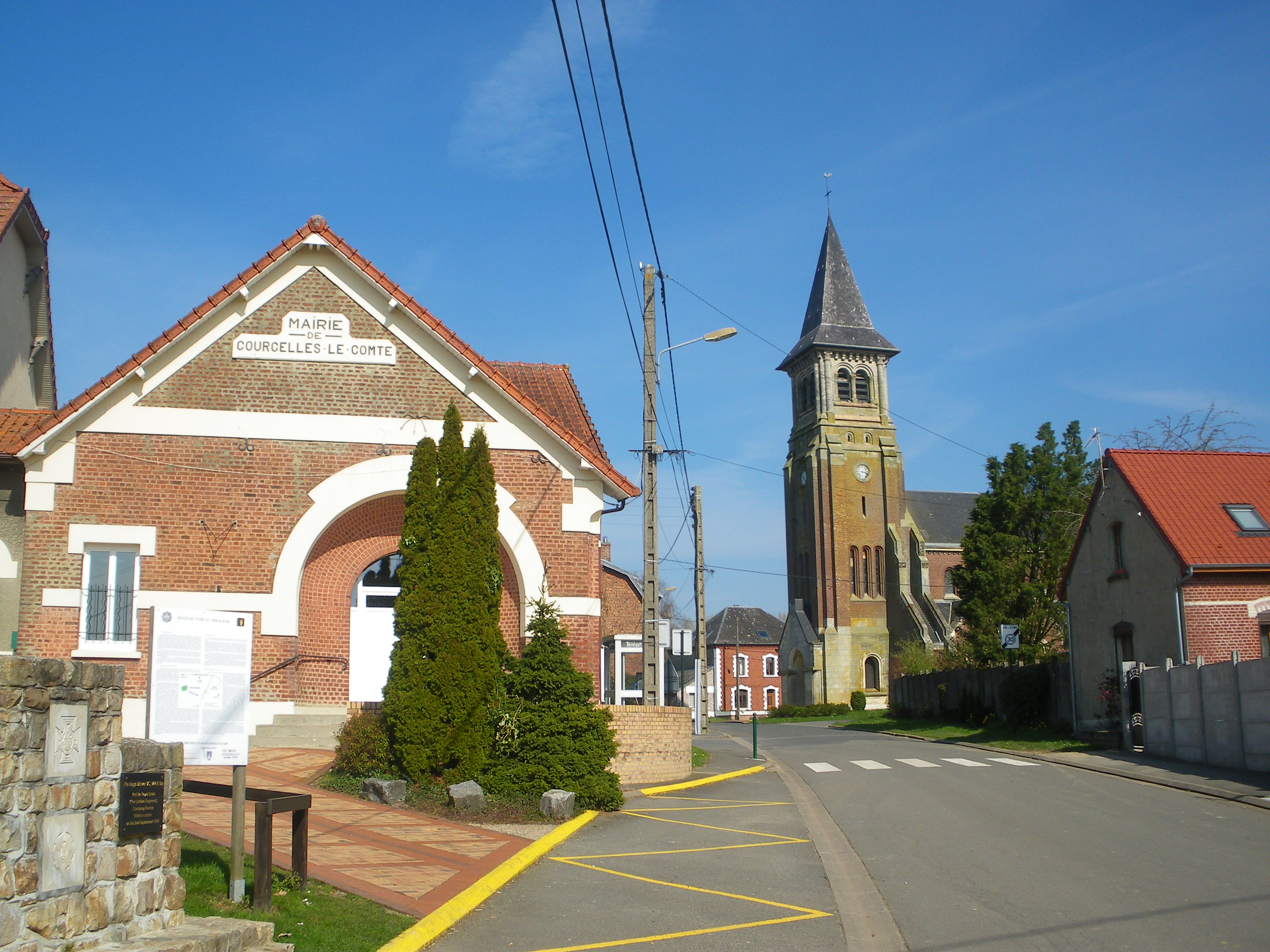
- The centre of Courcelles-le-Comte

- Coat of arms
- Location of Courcelles-le-Comte
- Location within France Location within Hauts-de-France
- Coordinates: 50°09′48″N 2°46′32″E
- Country: France
- Region: Hauts-de-France
- Department: Pas-de-Calais
- Arrondissement: Arras
- Canton: Bapaume
- Intercommunality: CC Sud-Artois

Government
  - Mayor (2020–2026): Jérôme Petit
- Area^{1}: 7.94 km^{2} (3.07 sq mi)
- Elevation: 112 m (367 ft)
- Highest elevation: 137 m (449 ft)
- Lowest elevation: 99 m (325 ft)
- Population (2023): 479
  - Density: 60.3/km^{2} (156/sq mi)
- Time zone: UTC+01:00 (CET)
  - Summer (DST): UTC+02:00 (CEST)
- INSEE/Postal code: 62248 /62121
- ^{1} French Land Register data, which excludes lakes, ponds, glaciers > 1 km^{2} (0.386 sq mi or 247 acres) and river estuaries.

Courcelles-le-Comte (French pronunciation: [kuʁsɛl lə kɔ̃t]; Picard: Courchelle-Comte) is a commune in the department of Pas-de-Calais, France.

== Geography ==
Courcelles-le-Comte is located 11 miles (17 km) south of Arras at the junction of the D12 and D32 roads.

== Population ==
Historical population
Year	Pop.	±% p.a.
1968	501	—
1975	419	−2.52%
1982	412	−0.24%
1990	409	−0.09%
1999	421	+0.32%
2007	459	+1.09%
2012	447	−0.53%
2017	461	+0.62%
2023	479	+0.64%
Source: INSEE

== Places of interest ==
- The church of St.Sulpice, rebuilt, as was most of the village, after the ravages of World War I.
- The Commonwealth War Graves Commission cemetery.
- Remains of an old castle.

== See also ==
- Communes of the Pas-de-Calais department
