= Decent Homes Standard =

UK technical standard for public housing

The Decent Homes Standard is a technical standard for public housing introduced in 2006 by the United Kingdom government. It underpinned the Decent Homes Programme brought in by the Blair ministry (Labour party) which aimed to provide a minimum standard of housing conditions for those housed in the public sector - i.e. in council housing or by housing associations.

In 2000, the government set out a target that it would "ensure that all social housing meets set standards of decency by 2010, by reducing the number of households living in social housing that does not meet these standards by a third between 2001 and 2004, with most of the improvement taking place in the most deprived local authority areas."

Local authorities were required to set out a timetable under which they will assess, modify and, where necessary, replace their housing stock according to the conditions laid out in the standard.

== Housing standards ==
The standard's criteria for housing are as follows:

1. it must meet the current statutory minimum standard for housing
2. it must be in a reasonable state of repair
3. it must have reasonably modern facilities and services
4. it must provide a reasonable degree of thermal comfort."

The standard was updated in 2006 to take account of the Housing Act 2004, included the implementation of the Housing Health and Safety Rating System (HHSRS).

The Renters' Rights Bill introduced into Parliament in 2024 provides for a new decent homes standard.

== Private sector involvement ==
The policy also makes it possible for local councils to privatise their housing stock via stock transfer to registered social landlords, housing associations or private companies, and to seek funding under the Private Finance Initiative in order to fund future developments.

== Local authority outcomes ==
Some local authorities calculated that large proportions of their housing stock were in need of upgrade. For example, Norwich City Council calculated in 2006 that 36% still needed refurbishment. Other local authorities, such as the London Borough of Lewisham felt unable to meet the 2010 target and applied for extensions of time to 2012 on the grounds that the works required major regeneration.

The policy led to the demolition of some tower blocks and prefabricated buildings which were deemed beyond repair or too expensive to refurbish.

Many local authorities set up ALMOs to manage their homes in order to access extra funding. However, in 2009 the Government diverted some of this funding to new building, to the dismay of the tenants who had got involved with the new management organisations.

At the start of 2010, the CLG announced that 95% of Council homes would meet the standard by the end of the year. However, provisional figures published in August that year indicated that 10.2% had failed the standard at the original target date of April 2010, and figures for London published in September showed that a quarter of Council homes still fell below the standard. By 2022, this figure had dropped to one in seven homes in the capital.
