= Stock transfer (housing) =

Stock transfer is a process whereby the ownership of council housing is transferred to a housing association. The term was first used in the United Kingdom. Here 1.3 million dwellings were transferred between 1998 and 2008.

== Evolution of stock transfer from 1988 in the United Kingdom ==
Stock transfer has become an increasingly centralised process. The term social housing was not originally widely used as Council housing outnumbered Housing association housing by about 6:1.

=== 1988–92 ===
There was no special legislation. Chiltern District Council was the first Council to take up stock transfer. 4,650 homes were transferred.

=== 1993–99 ===
An annual programme was introduced.

=== From 2000 and the Decent Homes programme ===
Stock transfer was part of a centrally driven programme. In 2000 when the Decent Homes Programme was brought in by the Labour government the policy also made it possible for local councils to privatise their housing stock via stock transfer to registered social landlords, housing associations or private companies.

== In New Zealand ==
In 2013 in New Zealand the National government announced the Social Housing Reform Program. One element of the reforms are the transference of state housing stock to the third sector. Criticisms include Salvation Army's Alan Johnson calling the stock transfers "privatisation by stealth".

On 31 March 2016 the Tamaki Redevelopment Company became the first recipient of a stock transfer. They received 2,800 state houses in Glen Innes, East Auckland. Housing commentator Alan Johnson called the transfers "privatisation by stealth".

== See also ==
- Privatisation
