= Cambuslang =

Scottish locality south of Glasgow

Coordinates: 55.819°N 4.1671°W

Cambuslang: Scottish Gaelic: Camas Lang; Scots: Cammuslang
- Town
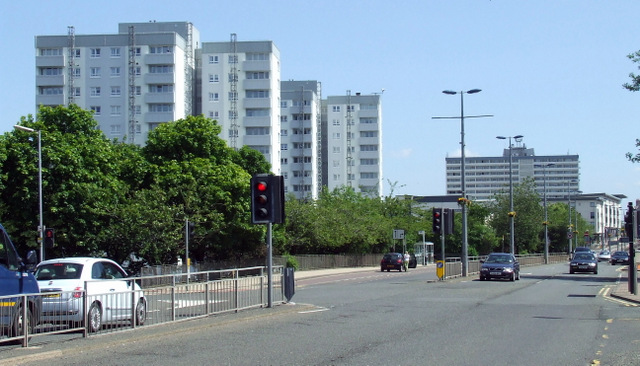
- Cambuslang main street, 2013

- Location within Scotland Cambuslang (Scotland)
- Population: 30,790 (2020)
- OS grid reference: NS642605
- Lieutenancy area: Lanarkshire
- Country: Scotland
- Sovereign state: United Kingdom
- Post town: GLASGOW
- Postcode district: G72
- Dialling code: 0141
- Police: Scotland
- Fire: Scottish
- Ambulance: Scottish
- UK Parliament: Rutherglen
- Scottish Parliament: Rutherglen

Cambuslang /ˈkæmbəsˈlæŋ/ (Scots: Cammuslang, from Scottish Gaelic: Camas Lang) is a town on the south-eastern outskirts of Greater Glasgow, Scotland. With approximately 30,000 residents, it is the 27th-largest town in Scotland by population, although, never having had a town hall, it may also be considered the largest village in Scotland. It is within the local authority area of South Lanarkshire and directly borders the town of Rutherglen to the west. Historically, it was a large civil parish incorporating the nearby hamlets of Newton, Flemington, Westburn and Halfway.

Cambuslang is located just south of the River Clyde and about six miles (ten kilometres) southeast of the centre of Glasgow. It has a long history of coal mining, from at least 1490, iron and steel making, and ancillary engineering works, most recently The Hoover Company (in the town from 1946 to 2005). The Clydebridge Steelworks and other smaller manufacturing businesses continue but most employment in the area comes from the distribution or service industries. The headquarters of the Scottish Fire and Rescue Service is in Cambuslang.

== History ==
The local geography of Cambuslang explains a great deal of its history. It has been very prosperous over time, depending first upon its agricultural land (supplying food, then wool, then linen), then the mineral resources under its soil (limestone and coal and to some extent, iron). These were guarded by the medieval Church, and later by the local aristocracy, particularly the Duke of Hamilton (previously Barons of Cadzow and Earls of Arran).

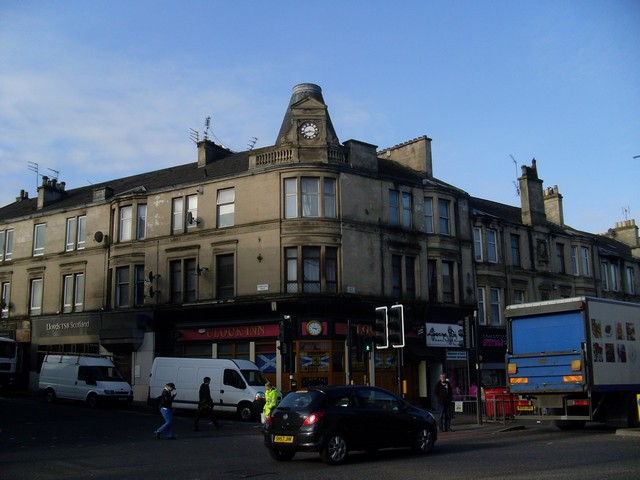
The Clock Inn bar, junction of Main Street and Greenlees Road

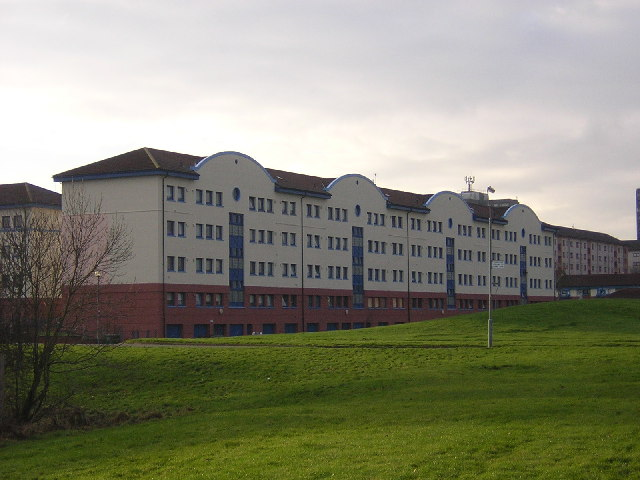
Modern tenements in the Whitlawburn housing scheme – demolished in the early 2020s

Because of its relative prosperity, Cambuslang has been intimately concerned in the politics of the country (through the Hamilton connection) and of the local Church. Bishop John Cameron of Glasgow, and Cardinal Beaton, were both Rectors of Cambuslang. This importance continued following the Protestant Reformation. From then until the Glorious Revolution a stream of Ministers of Cambuslang came, were expelled, or were re-instated, according to whether supporters of the King, Covenanters, or Oliver Cromwell were in power. The religious movements of the 18th century, including the Cambuslang Wark, were directly linked to similar movements in North America. The Scottish Enlightenment was well represented in the person of Rev Dr James Meek, the Minister. His troubles with his parishioners foreshadowed the split in the Church of Scotland during the 19th century.

The manufacturing industries that developed from the agricultural and mineral resources attracted immigrants from all over Scotland and Ireland and other European countries. Cambuslang has always benefited from its closeness to the burgeoning city of Glasgow, brought closer in the 18th century by a turnpike road then, in the 19th century, by a railway. In the 21st century, it continues to derive benefit from its proximity to Glasgow and to wider communication networks, particularly via the M74 motorway system. Its increasing (and increasingly diverse) population posed problems, over the centuries, of employment and housing as well as of schooling and health, not all of which have been solved; in this regard, it is fairly typical of most Scottish towns.

In sport, Cambuslang F.C. were founder members of the Scottish Football League whose most notable achievement was being the runners-up in the 1887–88 Scottish Cup. They folded by the early 20th century, as did Scottish Junior Cup winners Cambuslang Hibernian, but a new team Cambuslang Rangers F.C. was established and continues to this day – they enjoyed great success in the 1970s.

== Governance ==
=== Westminster ===
Cambuslang is in the Rutherglen Constituency for elections to the House of Commons at Westminster, having been within Rutherglen and Hamilton West between 2005 and 2024.

As of October 2023, Michael Shanks of the Scottish Labour Party is the local MP. He won a by-election after the previous incumbent Margaret Ferrier, latterly an independent, was removed in a recall petition. Ferrier won the 2015 and 2019 elections representing the Scottish National Party, with Labour's Ged Killen serving from 2017 to 2019. Michael Shanks retained the seat comfortably when the revived Rutherglen constituency was first contested in 2024.

=== Holyrood ===
Cambuslang was originally in the Glasgow Rutherglen Constituency for the Scottish Parliament at Holyrood. In 2011 the boundaries were redrawn and the new constituency renamed simply Rutherglen, despite its boundaries taking in not only Cambuslang but also Blantyre.

In the 2016 election, Clare Haughey won the seat for the SNP with 15,222 votes, giving a majority of 11.4%, replacing James Kelly who had been elected both in 2007 and 2011. Haughey was re-elected in 2021 with a slightly increased majority. Kelly remained in the Parliament as a 'list member' for the Glasgow region, elected on a proportional representation basis, until 2021.

For the 2026 Scottish Parliament election, Cambuslang will be part of the new Rutherglen and Cambuslang constituency.

=== South Lanarkshire Council ===
Administratively, the town centre is within the Cambuslang West ward of South Lanarkshire Council, which has a population of around 15,000. Taking another ward encompassing the eastern parts of the town into consideration, its overall population was approximately 30,000 in 2016. With neighbouring Rutherglen's figures being very similar, the many services and amenities shared between the towns should provide for 60,000 residents, many assessed as living in economic hardship.

- South Lanarkshire Council election results detailing local wards: 1995, 1999; 2003; 2007; 2012; 2017; 2022.

== Geography ==
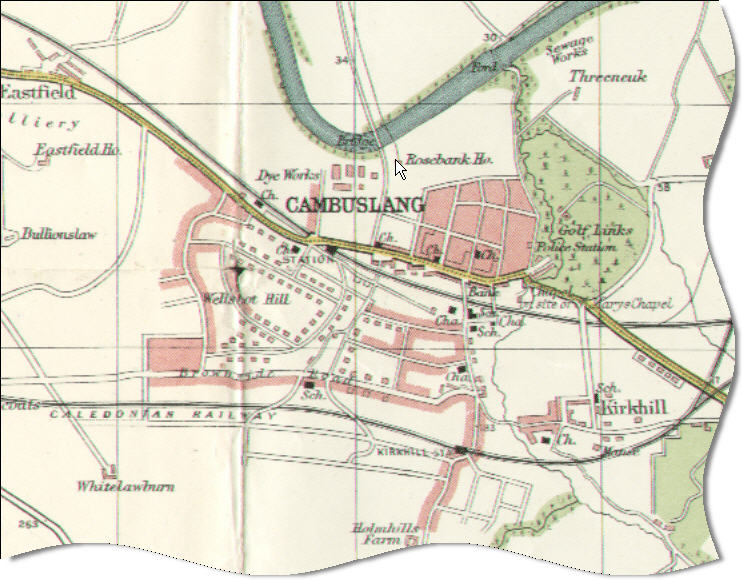
Map of Cambuslang, published in 1923

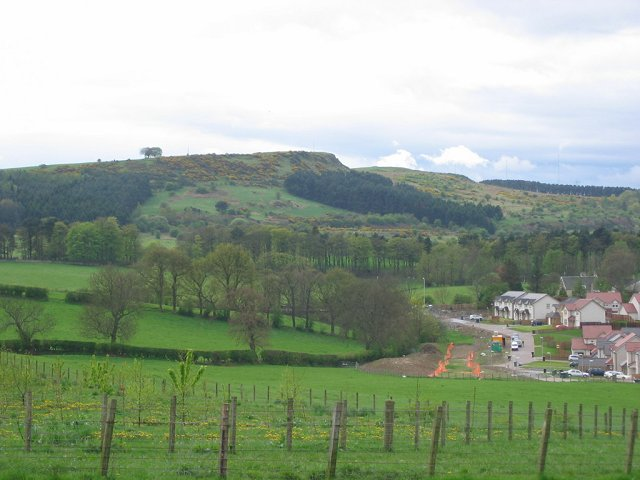
View north from Hallside towards Dechmont Hill

Cambuslang is located on a lengthy bend on the River Clyde, south-east of Glasgow. The town is accessible from the nearby M74; the nearby A724 links to Glasgow city centre and Hamilton; the town is also accessible by car from East Kilbride by the A725, A749 and then the B759. The town's railway station, Cambuslang, lies on the Argyle Line between central Glasgow and Lanark.

The Reverend Dr John Robertson, Minister of Cambuslang Kirk, described the Parish in the Second Statistical Account of Scotland 1845. "It is bounded by the Clyde on the north, which separates it from the Parish of Old Monkland; by the Calder on the east, which separates it from Blantyre; by part of Blantyre and Kilbryde, on the south; and by Carmunnock and Rutherglen on the west." The highest points in this low-lying Parish are Dechmont Hill (602 ft) and Turnlaw (or Turnlea) Hill (553 ft.) There are remains of an Iron Age fort on Dechmont.

== Landmarks ==
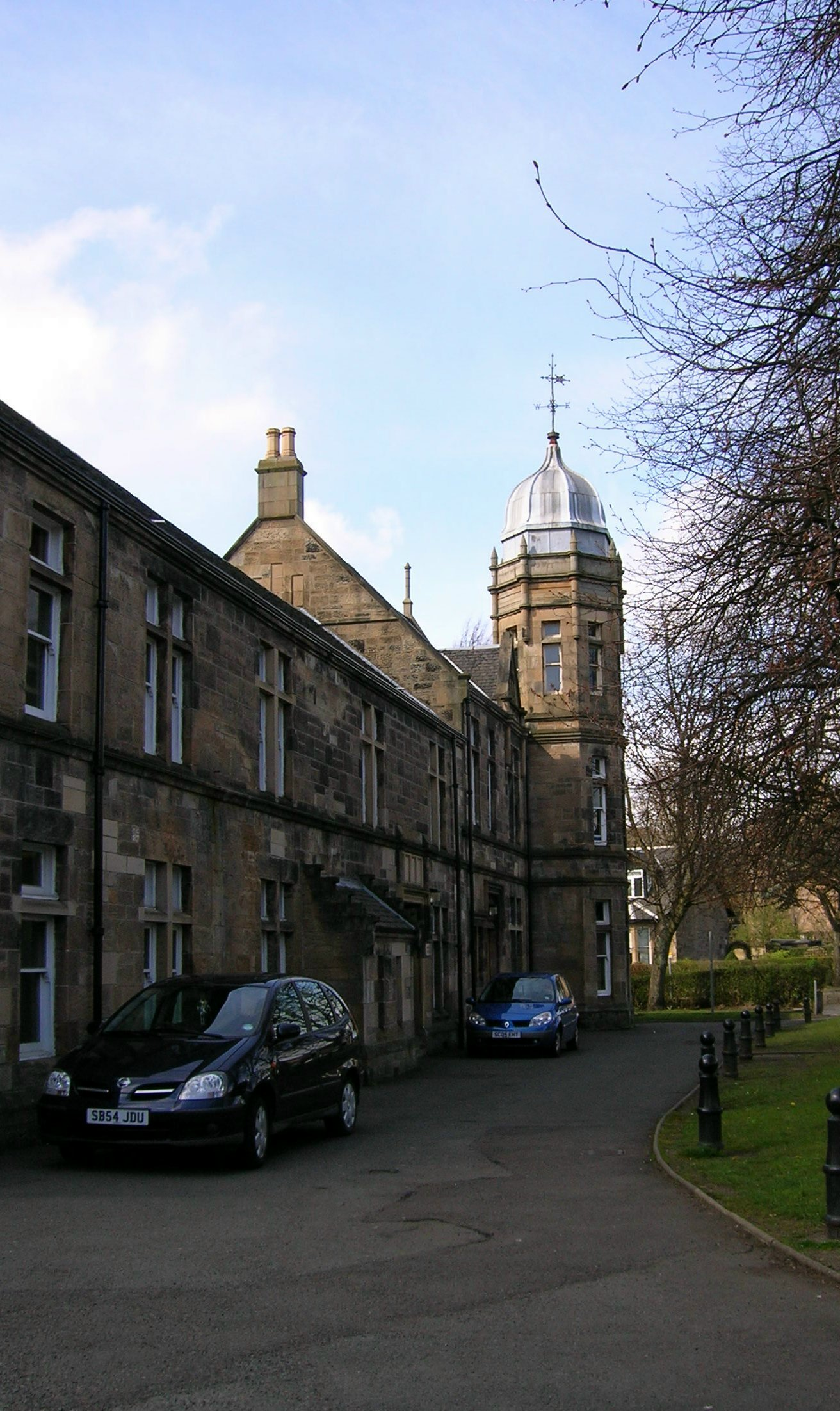
Cambuslang Institute

Cambuslang has an interesting range of churches, public buildings, schools, industrial and commercial buildings (see Buildings of Cambuslang). Its domestic buildings range from 19th-century mansions, villas and tenements to modern flats and detached houses, along with sheltered and nursing homes.

=== Sites ===
Cambuslang Park spans 27 acres (11 ha) encompassing the contrast of open parkland and the Borgie Glen, which is a steep tree-lined ravine, containing a complex network of pathways. The park also features a pond, sports pitches, war memorial (depicting a soldier in a kilt), woodland areas and the Bandstand, which is a natural amphitheatre, near where the famous Cambuslang Wark took place in the 18th century.

== Education ==
There is a range of schools in Cambuslang, and a history of further education colleges, although there are no longer any in the town.

=== Primary schools ===
Primary schools (2022–23 pupil roll in parentheses:

- Cairns Primary School (333)
- Hallside Primary School (254)
- James Aiton Primary School (148)
- Newton Farm Primary School (639)
- Park View Primary School (206)
- St Bride's Primary School (273)
- St Cadoc's Primary School (140)
- St Charles' Primary School (350)
- West Coats Primary School (409)

=== Secondary schools ===
- Cathkin High School (1006)
- Trinity High School (1186)
- Rutherglen High School (additional support needs) (110)

Some parts of Cambuslang are within the catchment area of Stonelaw High School, which is situated in Rutherglen, the adjoining town. Uddingston Grammar School, one train stop from Cambuslang on the Motherwell via Bellshill line, includes Newton Farm Primary in its catchment.

=== Colleges ===
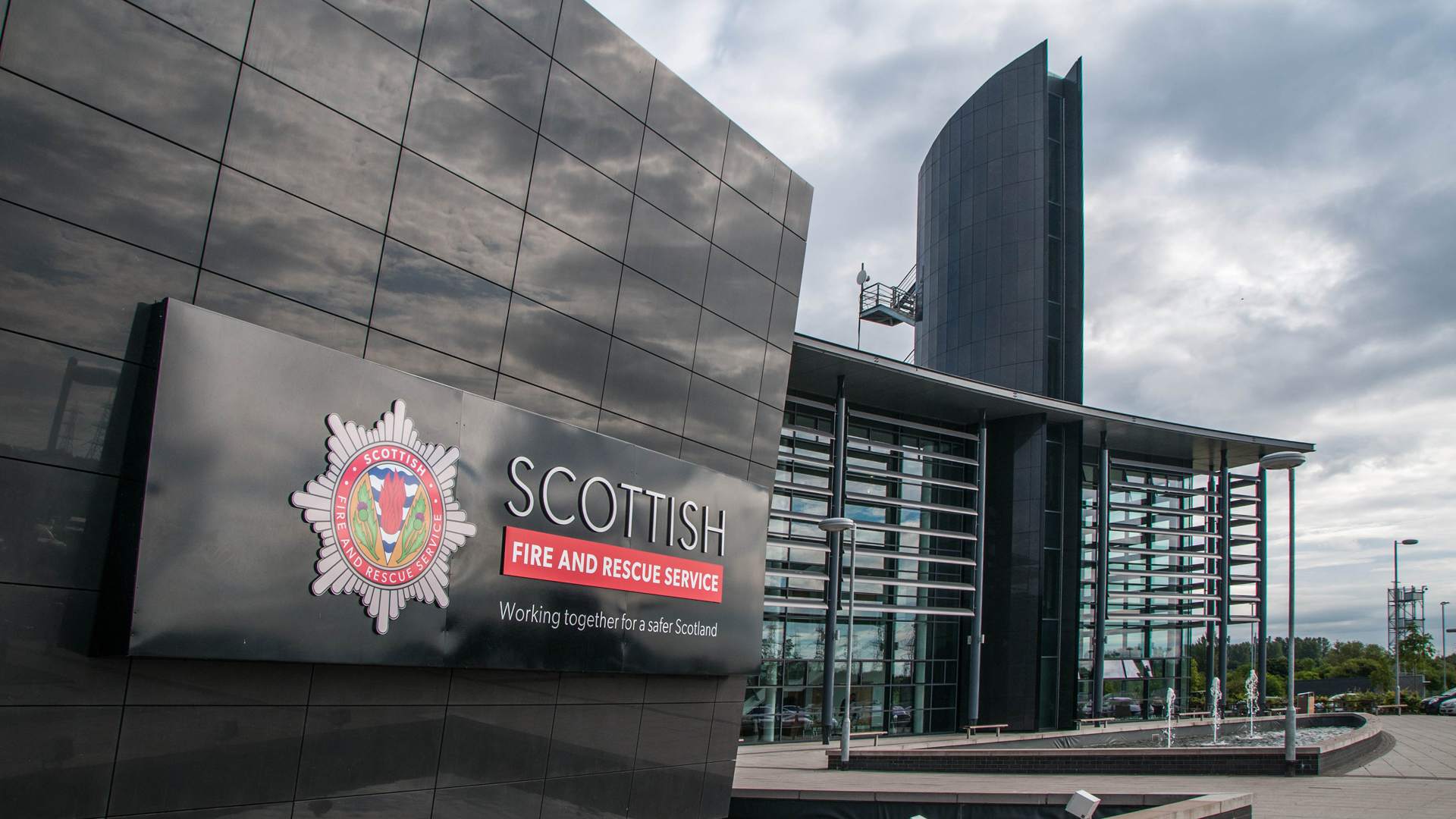
Scottish Fire and Rescue Service headquarters and training centre, Cambuslang

Cambuslang College of the Building Trades was a specialist college established in the mid-twentieth century but it gradually expanded to teach other trades and academic subjects. It became Cambuslang College of Further Education in the 1960s, and went on to open a campus in East Kilbride, as well as facilities in Hamilton and Wishaw. A substantial annexe remained in Cambuslang on Hamilton Road, by now located in the former Gateside School. Reflecting its wider geographical coverage, it became South Lanarkshire College in 2000. In 2008, the Cambuslang campus closed and all South Lanarkshire College facilities were moved to a new, custom-built campus in East Kilbride.

South Lanarkshire College has links with University of the West of Scotland, Hamilton Campus, a degree-awarding higher education institution, 3 miles (5 km) away in Hamilton, so that local students can progress through to degrees.

As well as hosting the headquarters of the Scottish Fire and Rescue Service, the Scottish national training centre for firefighters is based in Cambuslang (having previously been located in Gullane, East Lothian).

=== Early schools in Cambuslang ===
There has been a Parish school in Cambuslang at least since the Reformation, and probably before that. The schoolteacher was appointed and paid by the heritors, though he also charged fees. Free primary education came with the Education Act for Scotland (1871).

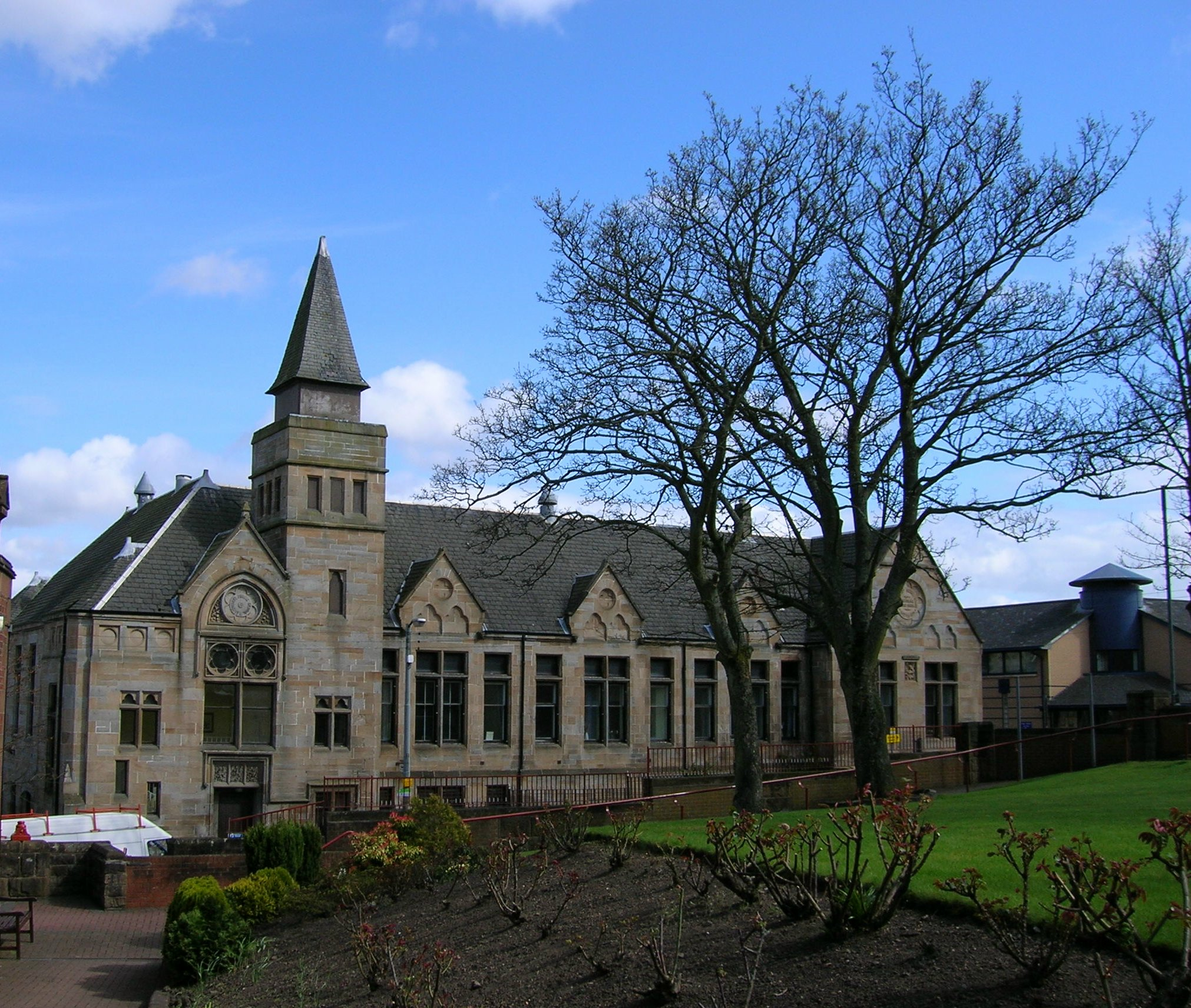
Cambulang's original public school (1882) became Cambuslang College of the Building Trades and then subsequently a nursing home.

The original Cambuslang Public School can be seen on Greenlees Road, where it is now Greenlees Care Home. It had been for some time the Cambuslang College of the Building Trades, which became part of Cambuslang College (now South Lanarkshire College ). An even earlier school is now a Gospel Hall in Bushiehill Street.

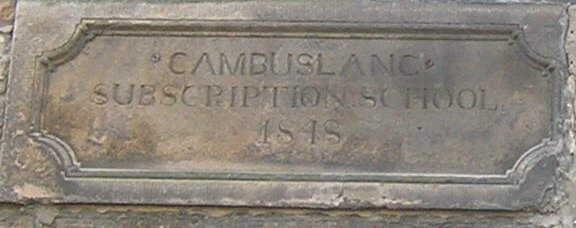
Cambuslang Subscription School 1848, now a Gospel Hall

The Cambuslang Subscription School of 1848 provided basic education to the children of miners and weavers in return for a few coppers. It was attractive to those who did not like the influence of the gentry and the minister on the parish school.

== Transport ==
There are three railway stations within the boundaries of Cambuslang - Cambuslang itself, on the Argyle Line section of the West Coast Main Line, Kirkhill on the Newton branch of the Cathcart Circle, and Newton, which is situated at a junction serving all of the aforementioned lines. Several bus routes pass through Cambuslang, with First Bus Glasgow currently operating most services between Lanarkshire and Glasgow. Several private hire taxi firms currently operate out of Cambuslang too.

National Cycle Route 75 passes through Cambuslang and extensive cycle lanes were added to the Main Street (A724) in 2016, although these were to prove controversial.

== Notable natives/residents ==
=== Cadoc ===
St Cadoc (c 497 – c 580), also called "Cadow" or "Cattwg", reputedly founded a monastery on the site of the present Old Parish Church in the later sixth century. He is the patron saint of Cambuslang, where there is a modern primary school named after him. His feast day is 25 September. In medieval times, Cadoc was called on for help by (among others) deaf people and those suffering from cramp.

He was a Celtic saint – previously, a Prince of Glamorgan – who brought succour to the native Christians against the invading Saxons. Cambuslang is at the northernmost reach of the Welsh speaking Brythons, so he may well have visited here in his wanderings, or in an effort to secure help against the Saxons. He had travelled to Ireland, to Brittany (to visit the Welsh-speaking monks there), Rome (the centre of Western Christianity) and Jerusalem (from where he brought back two altar stones that had touched the Holy Sepulchre.

The Europe he walked through was being battered by the barbarian invasions, so it is not improbable that he managed to reach Cambuslang. However, as no mention is made in the legends of an expedition this far north, it might have been a disciple, or a pilgrim returning from Glamorgan with a relic, who established the church at Cambuslang. Cadoc was cut down, while serving Mass, by a Saxon raiding party at "Benevenna", most probably near Weedon Bec, Northamptonshire.

St Cadoc was prestigious enough in his lifetime for local chiefs to have recourse to him to settle disputes. This reputation lasted well into the Middle Ages, where solemn bonds and oaths were sworn over his (or his followers') remains. Just before the Reformation, a wealthy Cambuslang notable expressed in his will a desire to be interred "with the ashes of St Cadoc", in the Parish Kirk.

=== David Dale ===
David Dale (1739–1806) was a Scottish industrialist and philanthropist. His efforts to establish a cotton-spinning factory at Flemington failed but he was very successful as co-founder of the New Lanark Mills in 1786. Dale owned the estate of Rosebank in Cambuslang, which he used as a summer retreat from his townhouse (reputedly still standing) in Charlotte Street Glasgow and to where he retired and lived until his death. The estate was sold after his death to the Caledonian Railway Company, which divided it in two to accommodate the new railway. The half to the north of the railway line, including Rosebank House, eventually became Rosebank Industrial Estate. The southern half was sold to Thomas Gray Buchanan, a Glasgow merchant, related to the Buchanan who established Buchanan Street in Glasgow, who established a country retreat at Wellshott House, but his son Michael sold off the lands to build suburban villas in the 1860s.

=== James Meek ===
Rev Dr James Meek (1739–1810) was Minister of Cambuslang from 1774 until his death. He had been Dean of the Chapel at Glasgow University, when the Rector was Edmund Burke and the professors included the philosopher Thomas Reid. He was Moderator of the General Assembly of the Church of Scotland in 1795. He wrote the entry for Cambuslang in the First Statistical Account of Scotland. The cool, objective account in his report of the Cambuslang Wark remains the prime historical source for that event. He kept a detailed "Journal and Register of the Weather..." for each day over 29 years, with remarks on weather and events throughout Britain and the world. This Journal is still quoted in modern histories of the weather. He is buried in the Old Parish Church kirkyard, just inside the gate.

=== Other notable persons ===
- David Beaton (c. 1494–1546) was Rector of Cambuslang from 1520. He was appointed to this post by his uncle, James Beaton, Archbishop of Glasgow, and was a prebendary, which means he lived off the tithes and never lived there, leaving the work of a parish priest to a vicar.
- Claudius Buchanan (1766–1815), Scottish theologian, an ordained minister of the Church of England, and an evangelical missionary to India.
- Sir George Burns (1795–1890), shipping magnate and co-founder of the Cunard Line resided at Rosebank House.
- Robert Crawford (1959–), Scottish poet and Professor of Modern Scottish Literature at St Andrews University, and wrote a poem called "Cambuslang".
- William de Cambuslang (died 1361), Bishop of Dunblane (1347–1361).
- John Dunlop (1755–1820), one-time Lord Provost of Glasgow resided at Rosebank House.
- John Colin Dunlop (1785–1842), historian and son of John Dunlop, also lived at Rosebank House.
- Robert Fleming the elder (1630–1694), Presbyterian minister at Cambuslang and Rotterdam.
- Sammy Gilmore (1939–2011), shipyard trade-unionist; most notably a leader of the Upper Clyde Shipbuilders work-in in 1971.
- Duncan Munro Glen (1933–2008), prolific poet and historian, Emeritus Professor of Visual Communication at Nottingham Trent University.
- William Hamilton of Gilbertfield (1665–1751), wrote a metrical abridgement, in 18th-century Scots, of Blind Harry's poem The Actes and Deidis of the Illustre and Vallyeant Campioun Schir William Wallace on Sir William Wallace, whose 17th-century castle remains, though in ruins. He corresponded with Allan Ramsay and his poetry was praised in an epistle by Robert Burns – where he referred to him as "Gilbertfield".
- Scott Harrison (1977–), World Boxing Organisation featherweight champion for 2002.
- Jimmy Jackson (1875–c. 1914), Scottish-Australian footballer.
- Robin Jenkins (1912–2005), novelist.
- John Claudius Loudon (1783–1843), a famous gardener (or rather "horticultural writer, dendrologist and designer"), wrote the Encyclopaedia of Gardening (1822), and invented a flexible iron-bar sash which made possible such monumental greenhouses as the Palm House at Kew Gardens and the Crystal Palace.

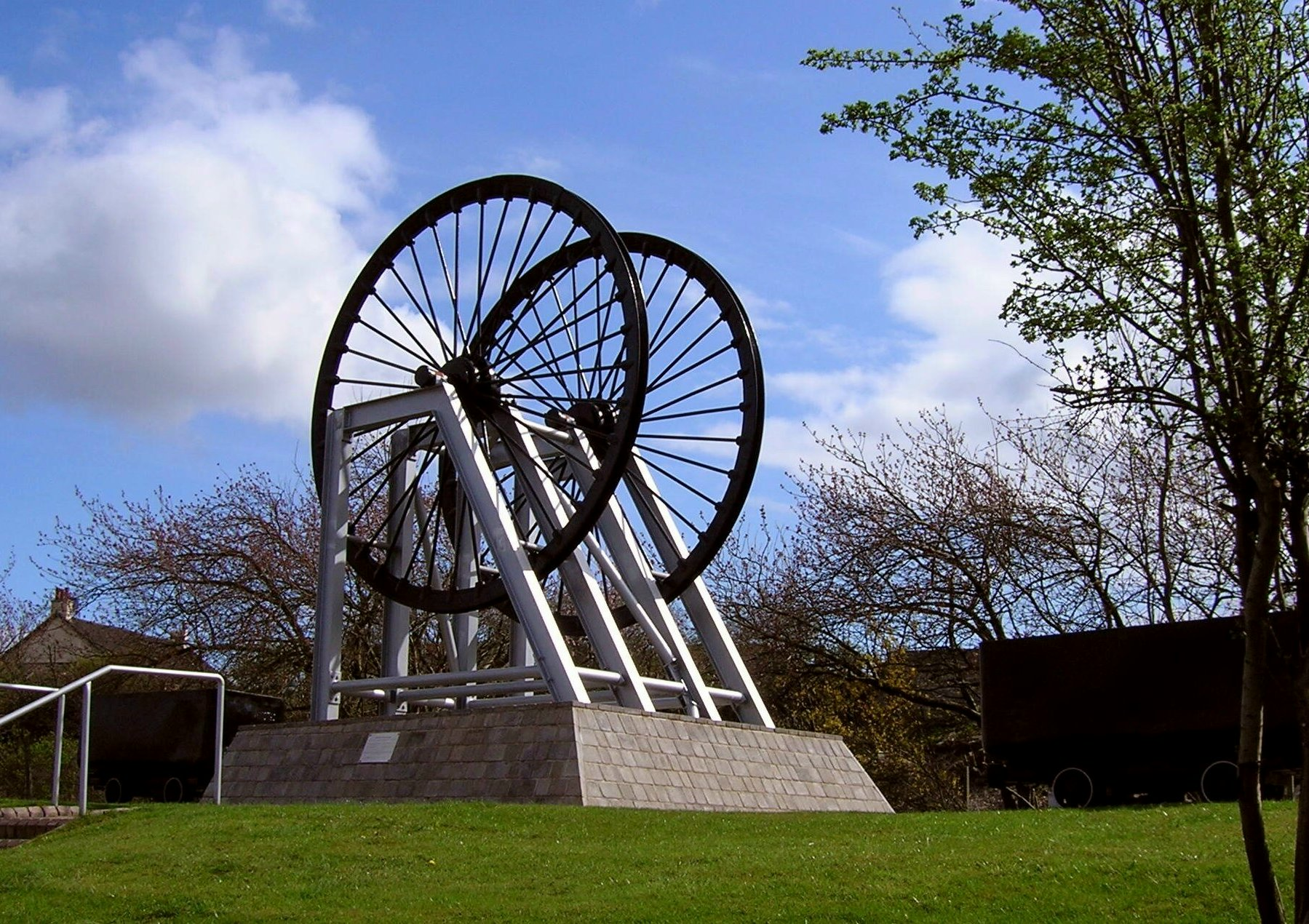
Cambuslang Miners Monument "In memory of the men, women and children, many of whom died whilst working in the pits and collieries of Cambuslang [...] Also to the memory of Mick McGahe

- Sir Thomas Lipton (1850–1931) of tea fame lived in the Johnstone Villa in Cambuslang, which was named after his mother's family.
- J. B. Lockhart (1886-1969) mathematician and educator.
- Rev David Lunan (1944–), Moderator of the General Assembly of the Church of Scotland (effective 2008).
- Mick McGahey (1925–1999), miners' leader.
- John McWhan (1885–1943), mathematician and educator
- Dr David Forbes Martyn (1906–1970), physicist and radiographer, contributing to the development of coastal and air defence radar for Australia during World War II.
- Brendan O'Hare (1970–), musician.
- Dorothy Carleton Smyth (1880–1933), Scottish artist and an active supporter of the Woman's Suffrage Campaign.
- Midge Ure (1953–), pop-singer and anti-hunger campaigner (Band Aid and Live 8).
- Mike Watson (1949–), previously a Labour life peer as Lord Watson of Invergowrie, was given a 16-month prison sentence in 2005 for wilful fire-raising. Though born in Cambuslang in 1949, Watson moved early to Invergowrie near Dundee.
- Robert Wilson (1907–1964), opera and concert singer (D'Oyly Carte Opera Company) and recording artist (Parlophone and His Master's Voice).

== See also ==
- Routes To Work South
