= Overtoun Park =

Park in Rutherglen, Scotland

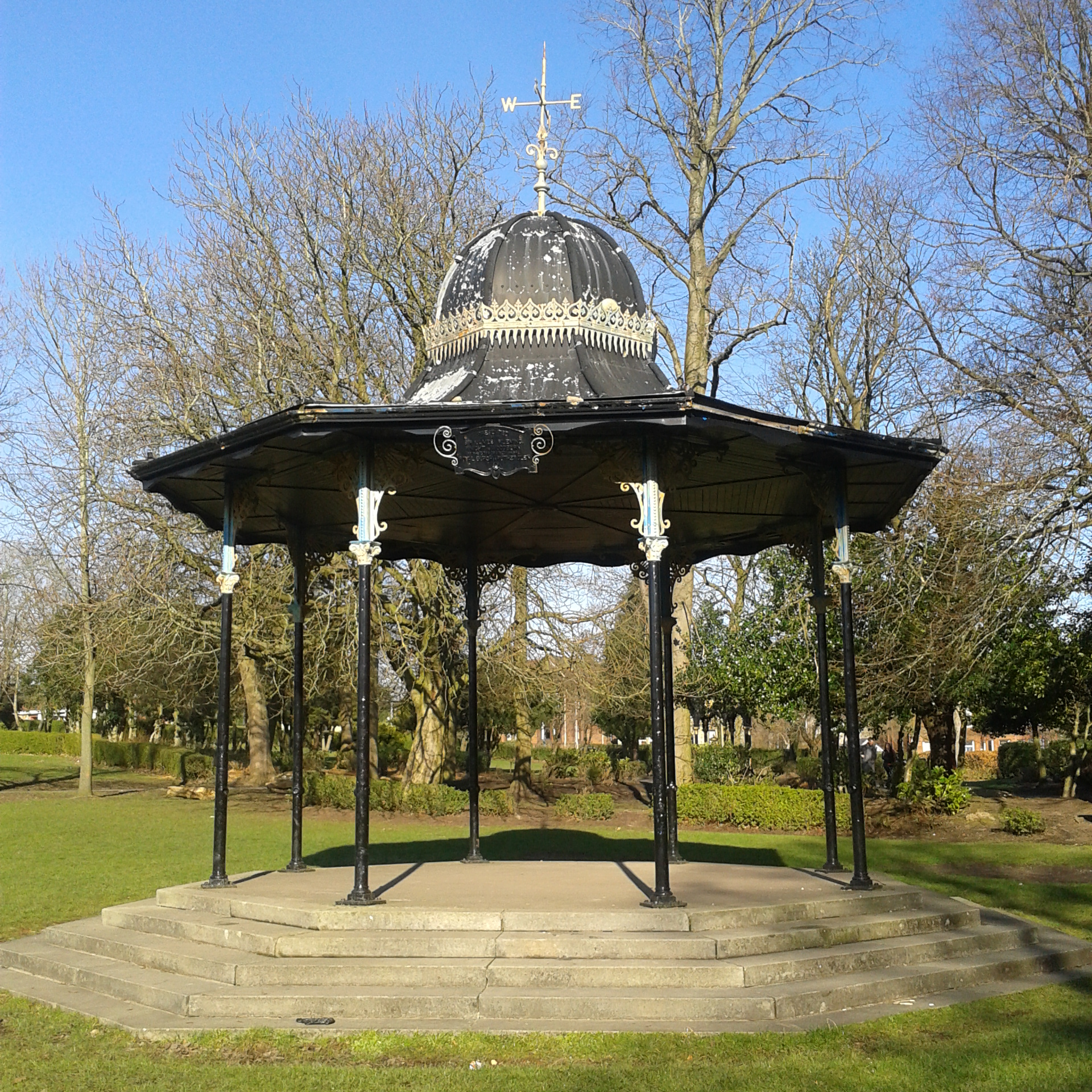
- Bandstand (1914) at the centre of the park
- Interactive map of Overtoun Park
- Type: Public park
- Location: Rutherglen, Scotland
- OS grid: NS6131460919
- Coordinates: 55.8216°N 4.2139°W
- Area: 8 hectares (20 acres)
- Operator: South Lanarkshire Council

Overtoun Park is a public park in Rutherglen, South Lanarkshire, Scotland.

Located close to the geographical centre of the town (surrounded by the High Crosshill, Stonelaw, Clincarthill and Quigleys residential neighbourhoods as well the local health centre), it is easily accessible to residents from many parts of the town and is thus fairly well used at most times.

== History ==
The park was laid out on land donated to the Burgh in 1904 by Lord Overtoun, whose White's Chemical Works also ruined much of the area by reckless dumping of their toxic byproduct. Around the same time he made a similar donation for a park in Dalmuir near his family home, Overtoun House (both today in West Dunbartonshire), which initially had the same name and is bounded by Overtoun Road but is now known simply as Dalmuir Park.

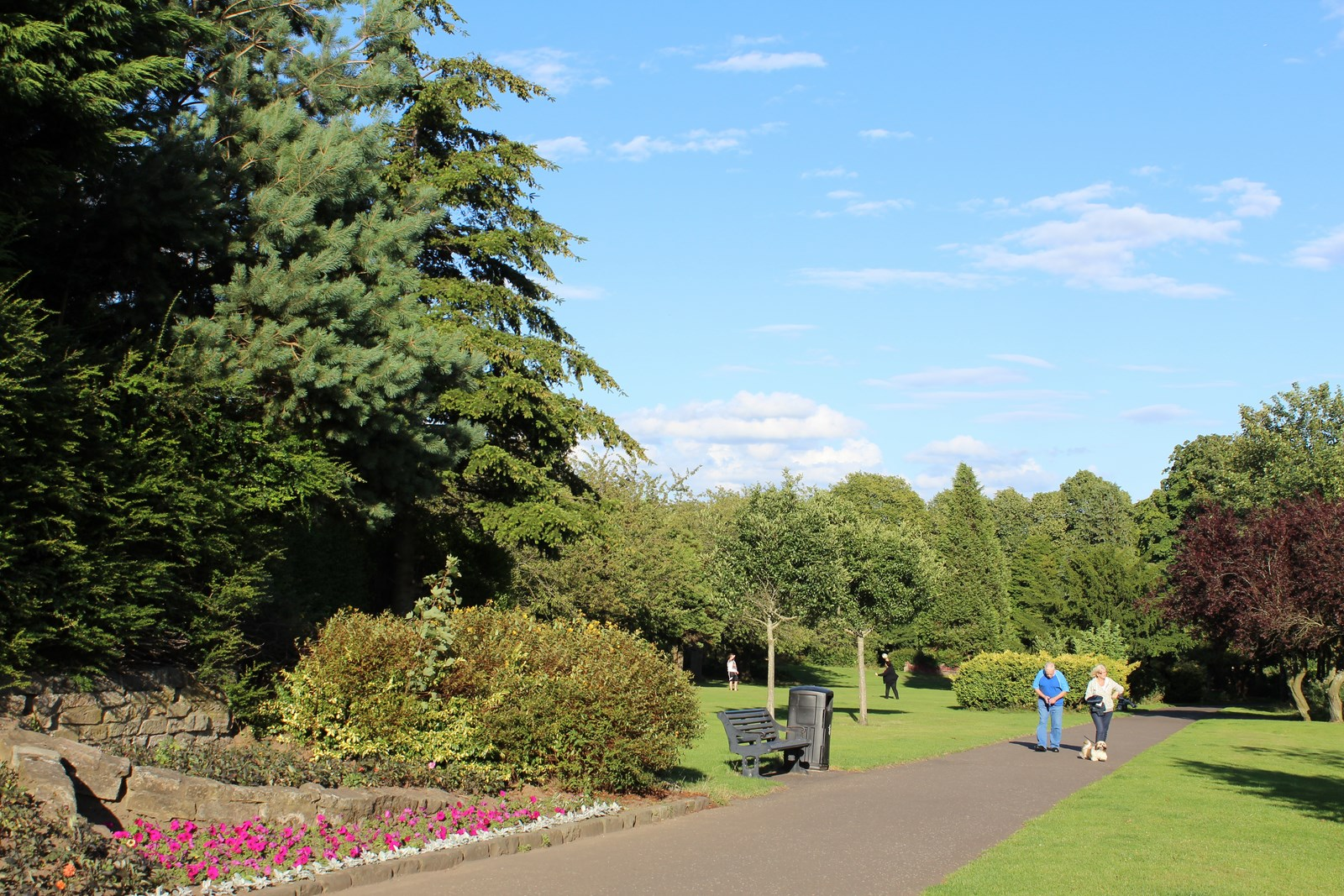
Path and rockeries at north-west part of park

Rutherglen's Overtoun Park, the landscaped part of which – 13 acres (5.3 ha) in area – is roughly square-shaped with entrances at each corner but with the north-west corner on a much higher elevation than the others, was once the location of much of the annual Landemer Day fair and parade celebrations (early June), now confined to the Main Street. It was briefly one of the City of Glasgow District Parks when Rutherglen was under Glasgow rule from 1975 to 1996.

=== Listed structures ===
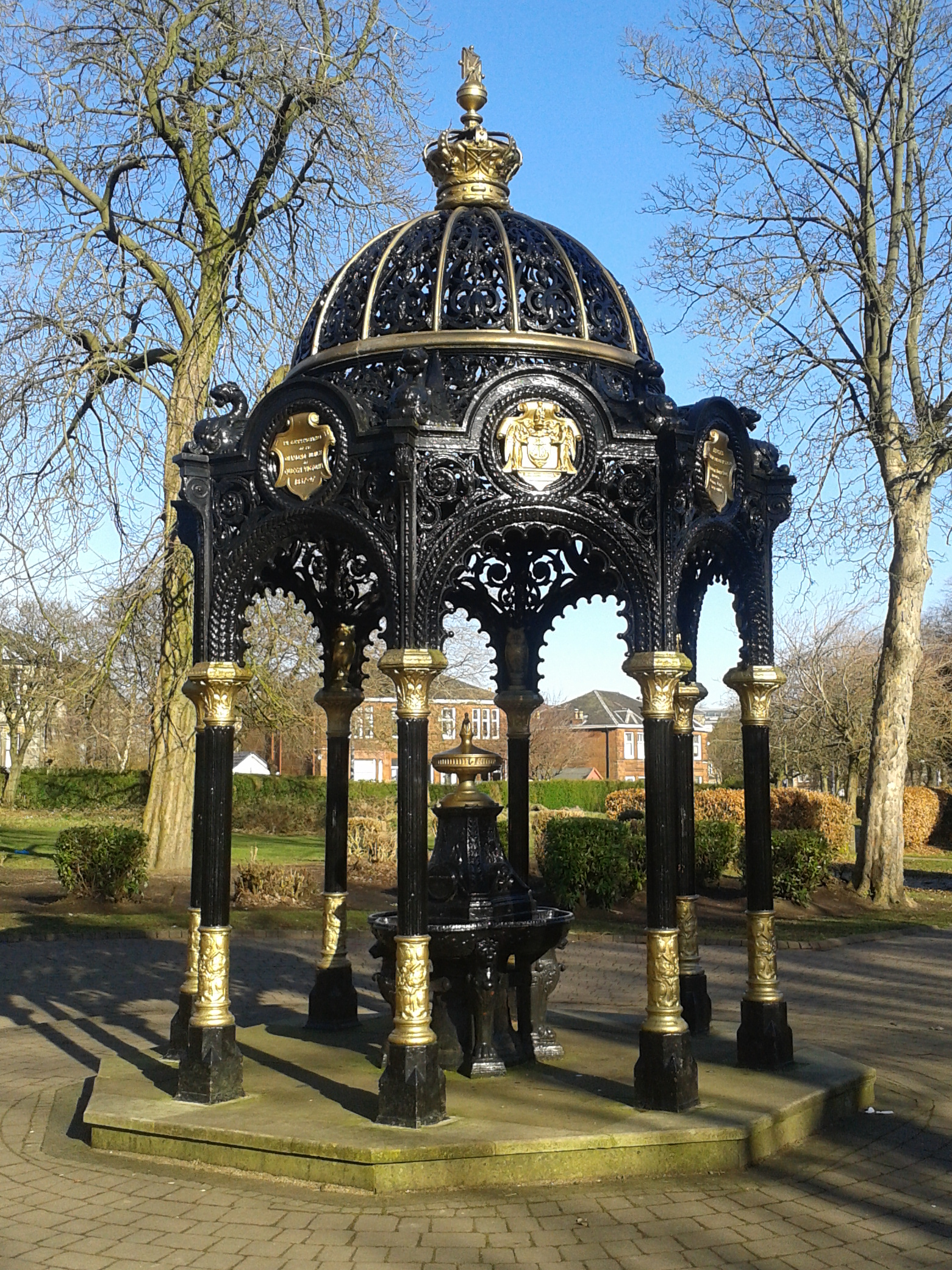
Queen Victoria fountain

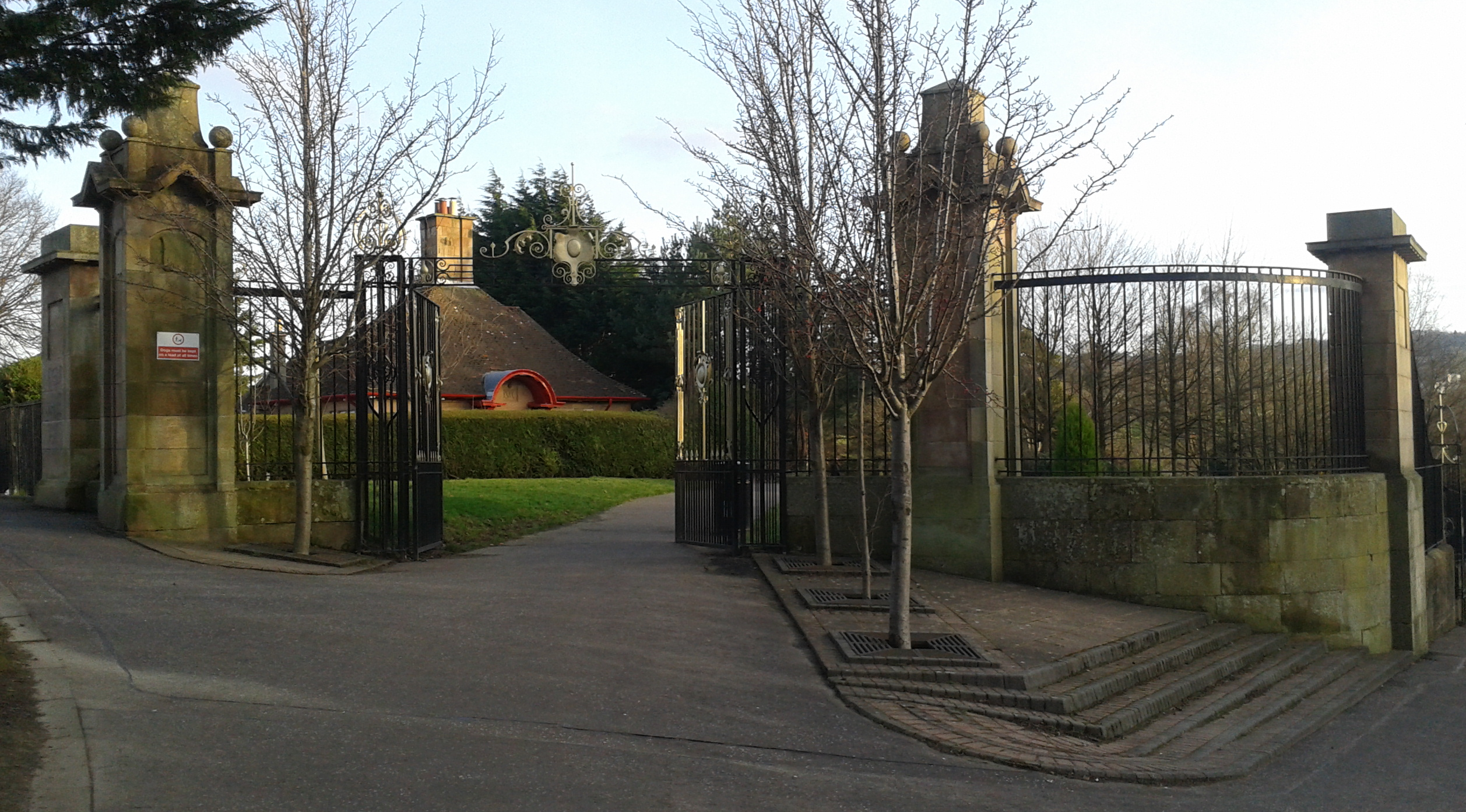
Park gates at Mill Street / Overtoun Drive

The Category B listed cast iron drinking fountain in the park, created by the Saracen Foundry in northern Glasgow was erected in 1897 to mark Queen Victoria's Diamond Jubilee (not all commissioned fountains from the era survived into the 21st century, although near-identical models can still be found at various locations in the British Isles, and as far afield as Tasmania, Jamaica and South Africa). It was originally located at the western end of Rutherglen Main Street at 'the Gushet' but was moved to the park in 1911 as it had become an obstacle to the increasingly popular motor car.

The ornate bandstand (1914, also from the Saracen Foundry, similar in design to a number of surviving examples across Britain, and a very similar one in Elder Park, Adelaide, Australia) is also Category B listed. It was initially sited at the west side of the park surrounded by flowerbeds until it was removed in the late 1980s for the dual purpose of being used at the 1988 Glasgow Garden Festival, and to create space for the transformation of Mill Street into a dual carriageway (A730), which also involved the acquisition of a strip of land from the park and the repositioning of its ornamental iron and stone north-west gates (its third listed feature). The roadworks were completed in 1994, by which time the bandstand had been re-sited on a grass area in the centre of the park; it gradually fell into some disrepair due to a lack of use and maintenance, and in 2021 it was estimated that a six-figure sum would be required to fully restore it. It was extensively damaged in an arson attack in 2024 and removed for restoration, with the local authority announcing in 2025 that it could be returned by the time of the town's nonacentennial events the following year.

=== Other features ===
The main children's play area towards the southern end of the park was extensively refurbished and extended in the 2010s, although the basketball hoop and red 'play train' further uphill became dilapidated and were removed. National Cycle Route 756 runs through the park via its tree-lined north-south footpath.

Some other original recreational features are also no longer present (mostly sited on the flat land near to Rutherglen Maternity Hospital allocated for sport which was formally Rutherglen Public Park, while Overtoun Park was the more landscaped western sector): its red blaes football pitches disappeared entirely in the late 1980s with a care home built upon them – reducing this part of the park to 8.5 acres (3.4 ha) The tennis courts were neglected and eventually turfed over by the turn of the 21st century; in 2020, proposals were made by the Burnside-based Rutherglen Tennis Club to have these restored and roofed to attract players during the winter, however this in itself was controversial as it would involve a portion of the land being transferred to a private company. The plans received planning approval from the council despite some local objection, but then stalled in 2022 when expected funding from the sport's governing bodies did not materialise. The adjacent BMX tracks have been retained.

The environmental charity Grow73 have their base between the lawn bowling greens (operated as a standalone club with the public-access greens no longer in use) and the BMX tracks, and have been involved in several projects to improve the park's appearance and horticultural aspects, including a community garden; there is also a Friends of Overtoun Park volunteer group with similar aims in respect of its facilities and play features.

== See also ==
- List of listed buildings in Rutherglen, South Lanarkshire
