= List of listed buildings in Rutherglen, South Lanarkshire =

This is a list of listed buildings in the parish of Rutherglen in South Lanarkshire, Scotland.

== List ==
Name	Location	Date Listed	Grid Ref. (Note: Sometimes known as OSGB36, the grid reference (where provided) is based on the British national grid reference system used by the Ordnance Survey. • "Guide to National Grid". Ordnance Survey. • "Get-a-map". Ordnance Survey.)	Geo-coordinates	Notes	LB Number (Note: Historic Environment Scotland assign a unique alphanumeric identifier to each designated site in Scotland, for listed buildings this always begins with "LB", for example "LB12345".)	Image
1-5 (Inclusive Nos) Blairbeth Terrace And 76 Blairbeth Road				55°48′56″N 4°12′12″W	Category B	33703	Upload another image
14 Burnside Road, The Ingle, Including Gateway, Quadrants, Piers, Gates, Railings, Coach House/Stable Block And Summer House				55°48′44″N 4°12′01″W	Category B	33704	Upload another image
152, 154 Main Street, Rutherglen, Kirkwood Street, St Columbkille's RC Church And Presbytery				55°49′39″N 4°12′50″W	Category A	33567	Upload another image
King Street, Burgh Primary School With Boundary Walls, Railings And Gatepiers				55°49′45″N 4°13′02″W	Category B	50135	Upload another image
141 -147 (Odd Nos) Main Street, Rutherglen				55°49′43″N 4°12′51″W	Category C(S)	33565	Upload another image
Melrose Avenue, Rutherglen, Stonelaw High School (Main Block)				55°49′31″N 4°12′34″W	Category B	33568	Upload another image
Mill Street, Overtoun Park, Bandstand				55°49′18″N 4°12′48″W	Category B	33569	Upload another image
Mill Street, Overtoun Park, Gateway				55°49′22″N 4°12′58″W	Category B	33570	Upload another image
153 Stonelaw Road, Stonelaw Parish Church Including Gatepiers And Railings				55°49′25″N 4°12′30″W	Category B	33573	Upload another image
20-24 Queen Street And 115 King Street, Masonic Hall				55°49′44″N 4°12′58″W	Category C(S)	50134	Upload another image
209 Main Street, Bower Bar				55°49′44″N 4°12′42″W	Category C(S)	50136	Upload another image
73 Blairbeth Road, Duncraggan, Including Gatepiers And Boundary Walls				55°48′59″N 4°12′10″W	Category B	33702	Upload Photo
18 Farmeloan Road, Rutherglen, Former Rutherglen East Church				55°49′44″N 4°12′36″W	Category B	33554	Upload another image
Main Street Rutherglen, Mercat Cross				55°49′43″N 4°12′48″W	Category C(S)	33558	Upload another image
131, 139 Main Street, Rutherglen, District Council Offices (Originally Town Hall)				55°49′43″N 4°12′53″W	Category A	33564	Upload another image
Mill Street, Overtoun Park, Queen Victoria Jubilee Fountain				55°49′19″N 4°12′48″W	Category B	33571	Upload another image
56,58 And 60 Main Street, Mecca Bingo (Former Vogue Cinema)				55°49′40″N 4°13′02″W	Category C(S)	50139	Upload another image
3 Western Avenue, Rutherglen West Parish Church (Munro Church) Church Of Scotland				55°49′45″N 4°13′14″W	Category B	33700	Upload another image
Main Street Rutherglen, Old Parish Churchyard Including Kirk Port And Gateways				55°49′42″N 4°12′57″W	Category B	33561	Upload another image
34 Broomieknow Road, Blairtum Park House Including Gatepiers				55°49′01″N 4°12′39″W	Category C(S)	33550	Upload another image
Main Street Rutherglen, Queen Street Rutherglen Old Parish Church				55°49′43″N 4°12′57″W	Category B	33562	Upload another image
159, 161, 163 Main Street, Rutherglen, Post Office And Library				55°49′43″N 4°12′50″W	Category B	33566	Upload another image
53 Overtoun Drive, Mill Street, Overtoun Park, Superintendent's House				55°49′21″N 4°12′55″W	Category B	33572	Upload another image
Dalmarnock Road, Dalmarnock Bridge				55°50′14″N 4°12′34″W	Category B	33551	Upload another image
Main Street, Rutherglen Tower And Fragments Of Old Church				55°49′43″N 4°12′55″W	Category A	33563	Upload another image
41 Dalmarnock Road, Rutherglen, And 1, 3 Baronald Street Including Tennents Bar				55°50′01″N 4°12′28″W	Category C(S)	33875	Upload another image
84, 86 Hamilton Road, Rutherglen, Cairn Hall				55°49′35″N 4°12′23″W	Category C(S)	33555	Upload another image
Maccallum Avenue, Rutherglen, Stonelaw High School, Gallowflat Annexe (East Block)				55°49′37″N 4°12′20″W	Category B	33557	Upload another image
63, 65 Main Street, Rutherglen, Narplan House				55°49′43″N 4°13′02″W	Category C(S)	33559	Upload another image
Main Street, Rutherglen, Statue To Dr Gorman				55°49′42″N 4°12′58″W	Category B	33560	Upload another image

== Key ==
The scheme for classifying buildings in Scotland is:

- Category A: "buildings of national or international importance, either architectural or historic; or fine, little-altered examples of some particular period, style or building type."
- Category B: "buildings of regional or more than local importance; or major examples of some particular period, style or building type, which may have been altered."
- Category C: "buildings of local importance; lesser examples of any period, style, or building type, as originally constructed or moderately altered; and simple traditional buildings which group well with other listed buildings."

In March 2016 there were 47,288 listed buildings in Scotland. Of these, 8% were Category A, and 50% were Category B, with the remaining 42% being Category C.
