= List of Category A listed buildings in South Lanarkshire =

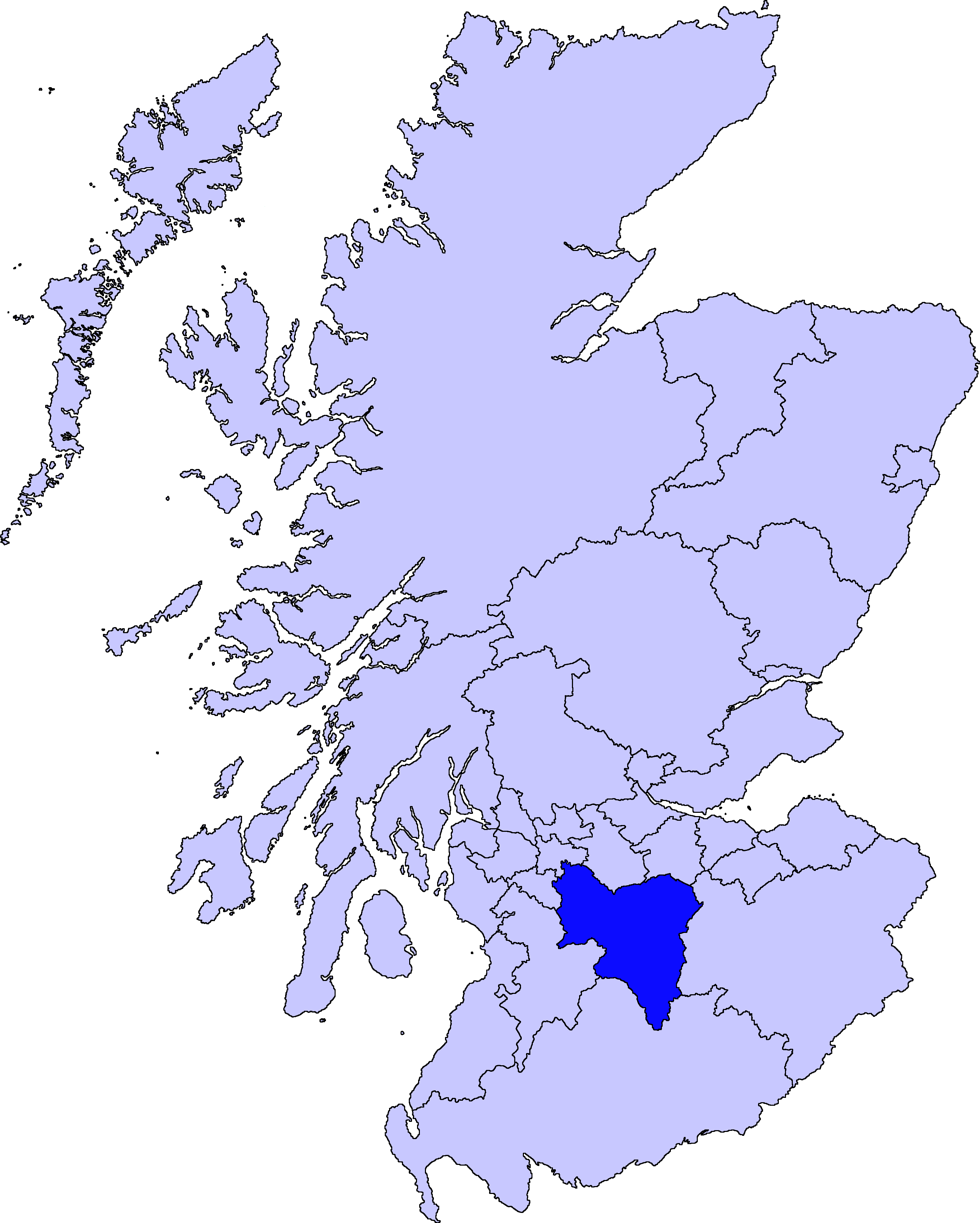
South Lanarkshire shown within Scotland

This is a list of Category A listed buildings in South Lanarkshire, central Scotland.

In Scotland, the term listed building refers to a building or other structure officially designated as being of "special architectural or historic interest". Category A structures are those considered to be "buildings of national or international importance, either architectural or historic, or fine little-altered examples of some particular period, style or building type." Listing was begun by a provision in the Town and Country Planning (Scotland) Act 1947, and the current legislative basis for listing is the Planning (Listed Buildings and Conservation Areas) (Scotland) Act 1997. The authority for listing rests with Historic Scotland, an executive agency of the Scottish Government, which inherited this role from the Scottish Development Department in 1991. Once listed, severe restrictions are imposed on the modifications allowed to a building's structure or its fittings. Listed building consent must be obtained from local authorities prior to any alteration to such a structure. There are approximately 47,400 listed buildings in Scotland, of which around 8% (some 3,800) are Category A.

The council area of South Lanarkshire covers 1,772 square kilometres (684 sq mi), and has a population of around 310,100. There are 90 Category A listed buildings in the area.

== Listed buildings ==
Name	Location	Date listed	Geo-coordinates	Notes	LB number	Image
Brownsbank Cottage	Candy Mill, Elsrickle		55°39′41″N 3°28′19″W	19th-century farm cottage, former home of poet Hugh MacDiarmid	640	Upload Photo
Old Collegiate Church, St. Mary's Aisle, and Graveyard	Carnwath, St Mary's Church		55°42′01″N 3°37′55″W	15th-century aisle of former church, located adjacent to present parish church	692	Upload another image See more images
Carnwath Cross	Carnwath		55°42′01″N 3°37′33″W	17th-century market cross	694	Upload another image See more images
Carstairs House (Monteith House)	Carstairs		55°40′51″N 3°41′04″W	Tudor Gothic house by William Burn, 1823, later used as a hospital and nursing home	712	Upload another image See more images
Tower of Hallbar	Crossford		55°42′13″N 3°50′55″W	16th-century tower house	723	Upload another image See more images
High Mill	Carluke, Chapel Street		55°44′12″N 3°50′03″W	Late-18th-century windmill tower and 19th-century house, the most complete windmill in Scotland	726	Upload another image
Scots Mining Company House	Leadhills		55°24′52″N 3°45′40″W	Early classical house built 1736, possibly by William Adam, for the manager of the lead mines	732	Upload Photo
Crossbasket	East Kilbride		55°47′00″N 4°07′40″W	16th-century tower with 19th-century house	1004	Upload another image
The Peel	Busby		55°46′40″N 4°14′41″W	16th-century tower with later additions	1005	Upload another image
The Peel, stable or barn	Busby		55°46′39″N 4°14′38″W	17th-century stable building	1006	Upload Photo
Wester Kittochside Farm	East Kilbride		55°46′49″N 4°13′14″W	18th-century farm, gifted to the National Trust for Scotland in 1992, now part of the National Museum of Rural Life	1008	Upload another image See more images
Earl of Angus' Monument	Douglas		55°33′30″N 3°50′57″W	Monument to James Douglas, Earl of Angus, sculpted by Thomas Brock, erected 1892	1457	Upload another image See more images
St Bride's Chapel	Douglas		55°33′30″N 3°50′50″W	Choir and south aisle of late-14th-century Gothic church, restored in 1878 by Robert Rowand Anderson, containing tombs of some of the Earls of Douglas	1490	Upload another image See more images
Newbigging Market Cross	Newbigging		55°41′48″N 3°34′06″W	Market cross dated 1693	5093	Upload Photo
Covington Parish Church	Covington, Thankerton		55°38′26″N 3°37′48″W	15th-century church, renovated 1903	5094	Upload another image See more images
Bothwell Parish Church (St Bride's Collegiate Church)	Bothwell		55°48′12″N 4°04′04″W	14th-century choir, extended by David Hamilton, 1833, restored 1898 by Robert Rowand Anderson	5134	Upload another image See more images
Bothwell Parish Church, Joanna Baillie Monument	Bothwell		55°48′11″N 4°04′06″W	Italianate Doultonware monument to poet Joanna Baillie	5135	Upload Photo
Bothwell Bridge	Bothwell, over the River Clyde		55°47′45″N 4°03′29″W	Earlier 17th-century four-arch bridge, altered in the 19th century, on site of the Battle of Bothwell Bridge, 1679	5138	Upload another image See more images
Craigievar and Gleneden	Bothwell, Laighlands Road		55°48′09″N 4°03′40″W	1855 villa by Alexander Thomson	5151	Upload Photo
Uddingston Viaduct	Uddingston		55°49′24″N 4°05′45″W	Three-arch cast-iron railway viaduct over River Clyde, 1848	5153	Upload another image See more images
Scottish National Memorial to David Livingstone	Blantyre, Station Road, David Livingstone Memorial		55°48′08″N 4°05′00″W	18th-century workers' houses, now the David Livingstone Centre	5162	Upload another image See more images
Dalserf Parish Church	Dalserf		55°44′06″N 3°54′47″W	17th- and 18th-century T-plan church with later alterations	5170	Upload another image See more images
Mauldslie Bridge	Dalserf		55°43′51″N 3°54′24″W	Three-arch stone bridge over the River Clyde by David Bryce, 1861, as private access to Mauldslie Castle (demolished)	5175	Upload another image See more images
Canderside Bridge	Canderside, Stonehouse		55°42′17″N 3°57′58″W	Three-arch stone bridge over Cander Water, by Thomas Telford, 1821	6452	Upload another image
Corehouse	Falls of Clyde		55°39′17″N 3°46′41″W	Tudor Revival country house by Edward Blore, 1824-1827	7679	Upload another image See more images
Corra Castle	Falls of Clyde	12 January 1971	55°39′12″N 3°46′40″W	Ruined tower	7680	Upload another image See more images
Chatelherault Hunting Lodge and Leopard House	Chatelherault Country Park, Hamilton		55°45′44″N 4°00′55″W	Ornamental hunting lodge by William Adam, 1731, associated with Hamilton Palace	12485	Upload another image See more images
Avon Bridge	Hamilton, Carlisle Road		55°46′11″N 4°01′04″W	Single-span bridge by Thomas Telford, 1820, carrying the A72 road over the Avon Water	12516	Upload another image See more images
Old Avon Bridge	Hamilton, Old Avon Road		55°46′06″N 4°01′15″W	17th-century three-arch bridge over the Avon Water	12518	Upload another image See more images
Hamilton Monument	Hamilton		55°45′58″N 4°01′39″W	Bust of William Hamilton, 11th Duke of Hamilton by T. Mossmann, dated 1869	12520	Upload another image
Barncluith House, terraces and summerhouse	Hamilton		55°46′01″N 4°01′33″W	16th-century garden terraces	12522	Upload another image
Baronald (Cartland Bridge Hotel)	Lanark		55°40′55″N 3°47′35″W	Large Scots Baronial mansion by Sir John James Burnet, 1891	12967	Upload another image
Jerviswood	Lanark		55°41′25″N 3°46′38″W	17th-century house	13053	Upload Photo
Hyndford Bridge	Lanark		55°39′16″N 3°43′35″W	Five-arch bridge of 1773, carrying the A73 road over the River Clyde	13055	Upload another image See more images
Corra Linn, Bonnington Pavilion	Falls of Clyde		55°39′14″N 3°46′26″W	18th-century classical viewing pavilion	13065	Upload another image See more images
Symington House	Symington		55°36′01″N 3°34′23″W	Neo-Georgian mansion of 1915 by Andrew Prentice	19673	Upload another image
Gas Showrooms	Biggar, Gasworks Road		55°37′24″N 3°31′40″W	Showrooms of circa 1840	22170	Upload another image
Gaswork Manager's House	Biggar, Gasworks Road		55°37′24″N 3°31′39″W	House of circa 1840	22171	Upload Photo
Biggar Gasworks	Biggar		55°37′24″N 3°31′41″W	Important early gaswork with many original features, 1839 onwards	22172	Upload another image See more images
Cadger's Brig	Biggar		55°37′21″N 3°31′41″W	18th-century single-arch bridge	22173	Upload another image See more images
St Mary's Church	Biggar		55°37′30″N 3°31′31″W	16th-century church	22257	Upload another image See more images
The Hunter Museum (formerly Hunter House)	East Kilbride, Maxwelton Road		55°46′36″N 4°09′01″W	18th-century house, converted to museum 1996	26607	Upload another image See more images
Brousterlands	East Kilbride, Brousterhill		55°45′49″N 4°10′40″W	Late-17th-century classical laird's house	26619	Upload another image
Mains Castle	East Kilbride		55°46′41″N 4°11′21″W	Mid 15th-century tower house, restored in the 1970s	26626	Upload another image See more images
St Bride's Roman Catholic Church	East Kilbride		55°45′47″N 4°10′06″W	1964 church by Gillespie, Kidd and Coia	26630	Upload another image See more images
Rutherglen Tower and fragments of Old Church	Rutherglen		55°49′43″N 4°12′55″W	Late medieval with later rebuilding	33563	Upload another image See more images
Rutherglen Town Hall	Rutherglen		55°49′43″N 4°12′53″W	Scots baronial town hall by Charles Wilson, 1862	33564	Upload another image See more images
St Columbkille's Roman Catholic Church	Rutherglen		55°49′39″N 4°12′50″W	Church by Gillespie, Kidd and Coia, 1934-40	33567	Upload another image See more images
Sheriff Court Buildings	Hamilton, Almada Street		55°46′46″N 4°02′56″W	Mid 19th-century classical buildings	34470	Upload another image See more images
Lanark County Buildings (South Lanarkshire Council Headquarters)	Hamilton, Almada Street		55°46′45″N 4°03′03″W	International modern tower by D G Bannerman, 1959-64	34472	Upload another image See more images
Hamilton Old Parish Church	Hamilton		55°46′34″N 4°02′13″W	Church by William Adam, 1732	34473	Upload another image See more images
Hamilton Old Parish Church, churchyard	Hamilton		55°46′35″N 4°02′12″W	17th- and 18th-century monuments, and medieval Netherton Cross	34474	Upload another image
92-94 Cadzow Street	Hamilton		55°46′38″N 4°02′13″W	Large commercial building built along with Cadzow bridge, by Babtie & Bonn, structural engineers, 1903	34503	Upload another image
Cadzow Bridge, Cadzow Street	Hamilton		55°46′37″N 4°02′15″W	19th-century bridge widened in 1903 by Babtie & Bonn	34504	Upload another image
Hamilton Mausoleum	Hamilton		55°47′00″N 4°01′54″W	Roman style mausoleum of Alexander, 10th Duke of Hamilton, built 1855 by David Bryce	34518	Upload another image See more images
Hamilton Burgh Museum	Hamilton, Muir Street		55°46′46″N 4°02′07″W	18th-century house by James Smith and later assembly rooms, now part of the Low Parks Museum	34521	Upload another image See more images
Riding School	Hamilton, Muir Street	Not listed	55°46′47″N 4°02′07″W	19th-century building, now part of the Low Parks Museum	34522	Upload Photo
Gates, gatepiers and railings at Auction Room and Cattle Market	Lanark, Hyndford Road		55°40′10″N 3°46′05″W	Pair of wrought- and cast-iron former toll gates, circa 1820	37024	Upload Photo
Cemetery Chapel	Lanark, Hyndford Road	7 May 1980	55°40′10″N 3°46′06″W		37029	Upload another image
Clydesholm Bridge	Lanark, Mousemill Road		55°40′32″N 3°48′02″W	3-span bridge built by John Lockhart of Birkenhead, 1696-99, the oldest surviving crossing of the River Clyde	37032	Upload another image See more images
New Lanark, Community Hall (former church)	New Lanark		55°39′52″N 3°46′54″W	Simple Gothic church by Thomas Carlaw, 1899	37037	Upload another image See more images
New Lanark, 1-10 Braxfield Row	New Lanark		55°39′54″N 3°47′02″W	Gabled terrace of mill workers' houses, circa 1790	37038	Upload Photo
New Lanark, 1-8 (inclusive) Caithness Row and the Counting House	New Lanark		55°39′47″N 3°46′48″W	Gabled terrace of mill workers' houses, circa 1790, with Counting House of 1816, restored 1966	37039	Upload another image
New Lanark, 9-16 (inclusive) Caithness Row with garages (former abattoir)	New Lanark		55°39′45″N 3°46′46″W	Gabled terrace of mill workers' houses, circa 1790, restored 1966	37040	Upload Photo
New Lanark, 1-8 (inclusive) Double Row, known as Wee Row	New Lanark		55°39′51″N 3°46′57″W	Late-18th-century terrace of mill workers' houses, restored 1994	37041	Upload another image
New Lanark, 9-24 (inclusive) Double Row	New Lanark		55°39′52″N 3°47′00″W	Late-18th-century gabled terrace of mill workers' houses	37042	Upload another image
New Lanark, 1-14 (inclusive) Long Row	New Lanark		55°39′52″N 3°46′59″W	Late-18th-century terrace of mill workers' houses, the longest terrace at New Lanark	37043	Upload another image
New Lanark, New Buildings	New Lanark		55°39′49″N 3°46′50″W	Classical Palazzo-style gabled terrace of mill workers' tenements, 1798, restored from 1978	37045	Upload another image
New Lanark, 1-11 (inclusive) Nursery Buildings	New Lanark		55°39′49″N 3°46′49″W	Terrace of mill workers' tenements with village bakery, 1809 with 1850 additions	37046	Upload another image
New Lanark, 1 and 3 Rosedale Street, Robert Owen's House	New Lanark		55°39′50″N 3°46′54″W	Gabled house of circa 1790	37047	Upload another image
New Lanark, 5 and 7 Rosedale Street, David Dale's House	New Lanark		55°39′51″N 3°46′56″W	Gabled house of circa 1790	37048	Upload another image
New Lanark, Visitor Centre (formerly New Institution For The Formation Of Character and Engine House)	New Lanark		55°39′47″N 3°46′51″W	Classical former Institution of 1816, engine house added to north in 1881	37049	Upload another image
New Lanark, Education Centre (formerly the School)	New Lanark		55°39′45″N 3°46′49″W	Symmetrical classical former school, 1817	37050	Upload another image
New Lanark, Mill No 1	New Lanark		55°39′49″N 3°46′58″W	5-storey mill, built 1786, rebuilt after fire 1789, restored as a hotel in the 1990s	37051	Upload another image
New Lanark, Mill No 2	New Lanark		55°39′48″N 3°46′56″W	5-storey textile mill, built circa 1789 and linked to Mill No 1 by 1817, extended north in 1885	37052	Upload another image
New Lanark, Mill No 3 with Turbine House	New Lanark		55°39′48″N 3°46′55″W	6-storey classical textile mill, built 1833, the best-preserved of the New Lanark mills	37053	Upload another image
New Lanark, Mechanics' Workshop	New Lanark		55°39′42″N 3°46′48″W	2-storey classical block of 1806	37054	Upload another image
New Lanark, Scottish Wildlife Trust Visitor Centre (formerly dyeworks and foundry)	New Lanark		55°39′42″N 3°46′49″W	Former foundry, 1806	37055	Upload another image
New Lanark, Retort House Chimney	New Lanark		55°39′40″N 3°46′50″W	Octagonal sandstone chimney of earlier 19th-century gas-making plant	37056	Upload another image
St Mary's Roman Catholic Church	Lanark, St Vincent Place		55°40′20″N 3°46′24″W	Mid 19th-century Gothic revival church by Goldie and Hadfield, rebuilt 1908 after fire	37062	Upload another image See more images
St Mary's Church Hall	Lanark, St Vincent Place		55°40′21″N 3°46′25″W	Mid 19th-century school by Goldie and Hadfield	37065	Upload Photo
St Mary's Presbytery	Lanark, St Vincent Place		55°40′20″N 3°46′22″W	Mid 19th-century L-plan building by Goldie and Hadfield	37066	Upload Photo
New Lanark, Weir, Tunnel and Lade	New Lanark		55°39′33″N 3°46′48″W	Stone and timber weir and rock-cut tunnel, built 1785	44552	Upload another image
Mauldslie West Lodge, gateway and gates	Mauldslie, Dalserf		55°43′51″N 3°54′26″W	Gothic lodge, probably David Bryce, dated 1861	45125	Upload another image See more images
New Lanark, Water Houses	New Lanark		55°39′48″N 3°46′59″W	Terrace of former stores, built 1810 and converted to residential use in the 1990s	46471	Upload Photo
Torrance House	Calderglen Country Park, East Kilbride		55°44′55″N 4°08′41″W	Early-17th-century L-plan tower house, with 18th-century additions to designs by William Adam, and 19th-century Scots Baronial alterations	48654	Upload another image
Dollan Aqua Centre	East Kilbride	13 June 2002	55°45′43″N 4°10′57″W	Swimming pool by Buchanan Campbell, 1965, with parabolic roof	48682	Upload another image See more images
Stonebyres Power Station	Falls of Clyde	11 February 2011	55°40′38″N 3°49′43″W	Hydro-electric plant	51719	Upload another image
Stonebyres Power Station weir and bridge	Falls of Clyde	11 February 2011	55°40′34″N 3°49′20″W		51720	Upload another image
Bonnington Power Station	Falls of Clyde	3 March 2011	55°39′20″N 3°46′31″W	Hydro-electric plant	51727	Upload another image
Bonnington Power Station weir and bridge	Falls of Clyde	3 March 2011	55°40′34″N 3°49′20″W		51728	Upload another image

== See also ==
- List of listed buildings in South Lanarkshire
- Scheduled monuments in South Lanarkshire
