= St Mary's Roman Catholic Church, Lanark =

St Mary's Church
- St Mary's Roman Catholic Church
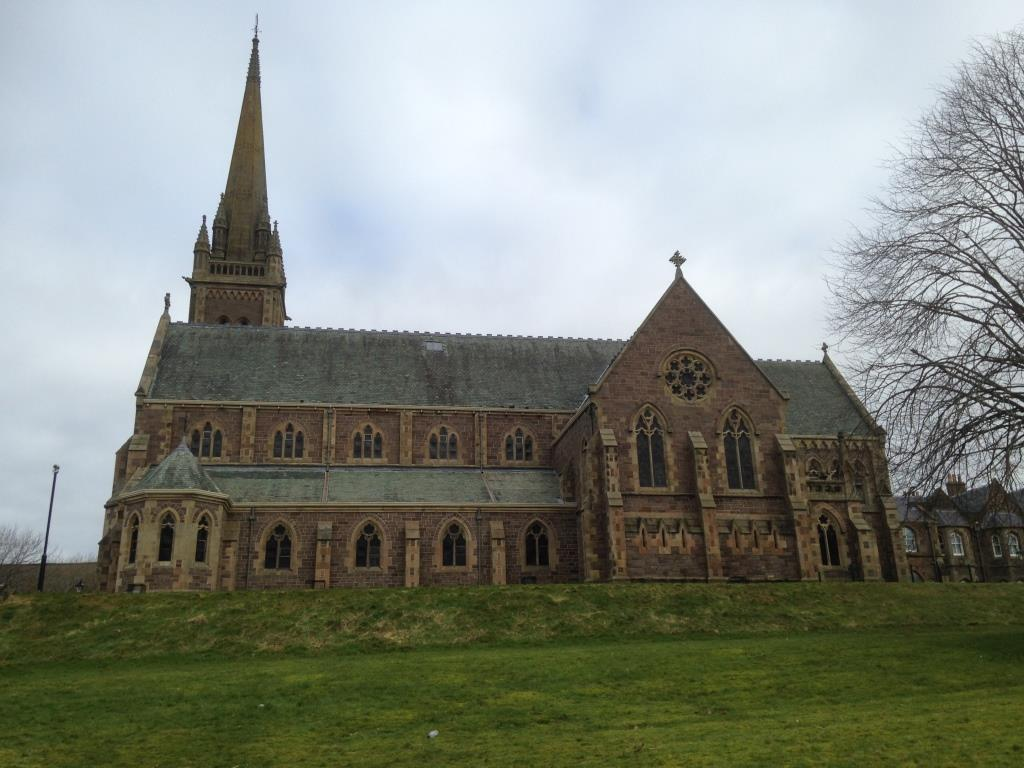
- St Mary's Church
- 55.672268°N 3.773062°W
- Location: Lanark, South Lanarkshire
- Country: Scotland
- Denomination: Roman Catholic
- Religious institute: Vincentians (1859–2006)
- Website: www.stmaryslanark.org.uk

History
- Founded: 1859

Architecture
- Heritage designation: Category A Listed Building
- Style: Gothic Revival
- Completed: 1910

Administration
- Archdiocese: Glasgow
- Diocese: Motherwell
- Deanery: Wishaw
- Parish: Lanark

Clergy
- Bishop: Joseph Toal
- Priest: Rev John-Paul McShane

St Mary's Church is a Roman Catholic church in Lanark, South Lanarkshire, Scotland.

The church building and presbytery are Category A listed buildings. Also listed in Category A is the L-shaped school building to the north of the west end of the church.

The entrance gates to the church grounds and the Sisters of Charity convent, which form part of the St Mary's Church site, are Category C listed buildings.

In September 2011, the two-storey Hall that stood on Ladyacre Road was badly damaged by fire and was later demolished.
