= Hamilton Low Parks Museum =

Low Parks Museum
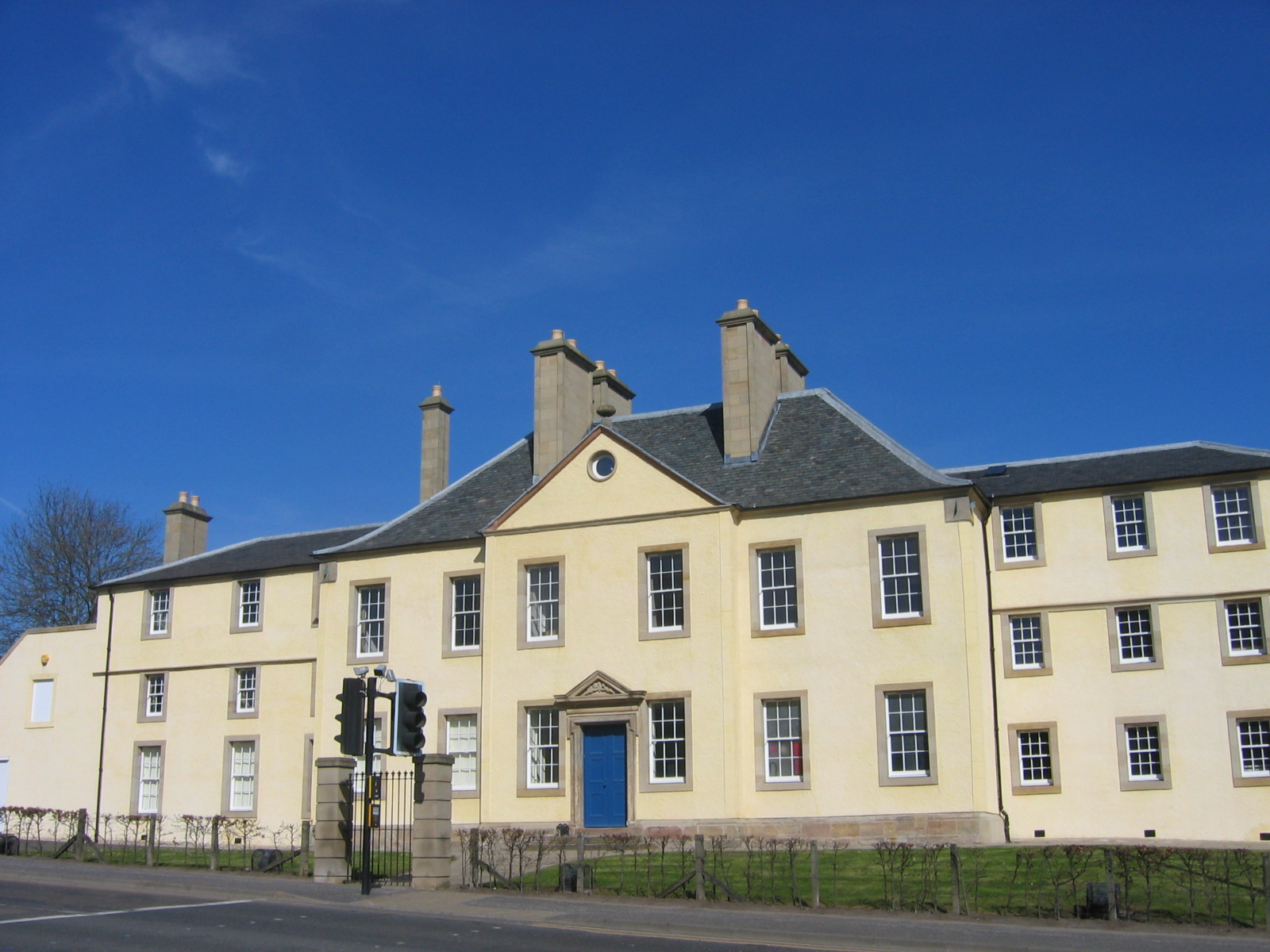
- Low Parks Museum, Portland Building

- Shown in South Lanarkshire
- Established: 1967
- Location: Hamilton, South Lanarkshire
- Coordinates: 55.779581°N 4.03503°W
- Type: Regimental museum
- Website: www.cameronians.org/museum/

The Low Parks Museum is located in Hamilton, South Lanarkshire, Scotland and traces the local history of South Lanarkshire through numerous exhibits on provincial industries and events of local historical importance.

== History ==
The Low Parks Museum first opened on 3 November 1967 as the Hamilton District Museum, and is housed within two historic buildings, both closely linked to the history of Hamilton and its Dukes throughout the years. The Museum is located next to the site of Hamilton Palace, demolished in 1927, and the history of the buildings is directly linked to the palace.

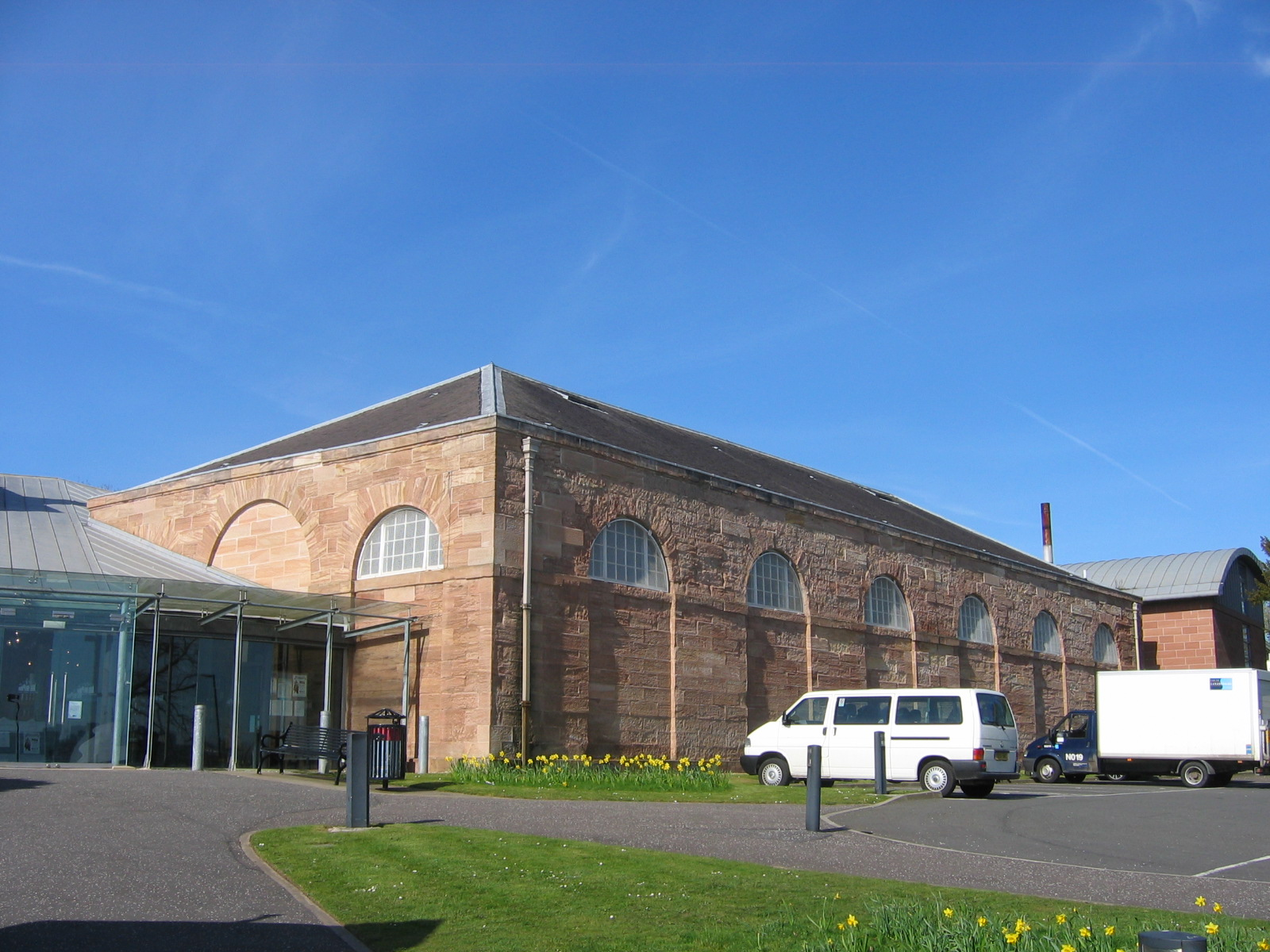
The former Palace Riding School

The first of these buildings, now known as Portland, was designed by the architect James Smith and built in 1696 as the private home of David Crawford, secretary and lawyer to Anne Hamilton, 3rd Duchess of Hamilton, and was sited near the foot of the 'Hietoun' close to the precincts of Hamilton Palace. It is believed to be the oldest surviving building in Hamilton. To the rear of the building is an assembly room and fives court, added after the 8th Duke bought the house in 1784. The house subsequently became a coaching inn on the London to Glasgow road, until the road was realigned in the 19th century. From 1835 the inn became the Duke of Hamilton's estate offices. The building was then purchased by Hamilton Burgh Council in 1964 and subsequently made into the museum that now stands today. The second building is the former Palace Riding School, built in 1837 by Alexander Hamilton, 10th Duke of Hamilton, to designs by William Burn to replace the stables court within the Hamilton Palace complex. The Riding School building became the regimental museum of the Cameronians (Scottish Rifles) in 1983. A refurbishment project in 1993 added new linking buildings and an entrance to the combined museums, which are category A listed for their national importance.

== Exhibits ==
=== Cameronians Museum ===
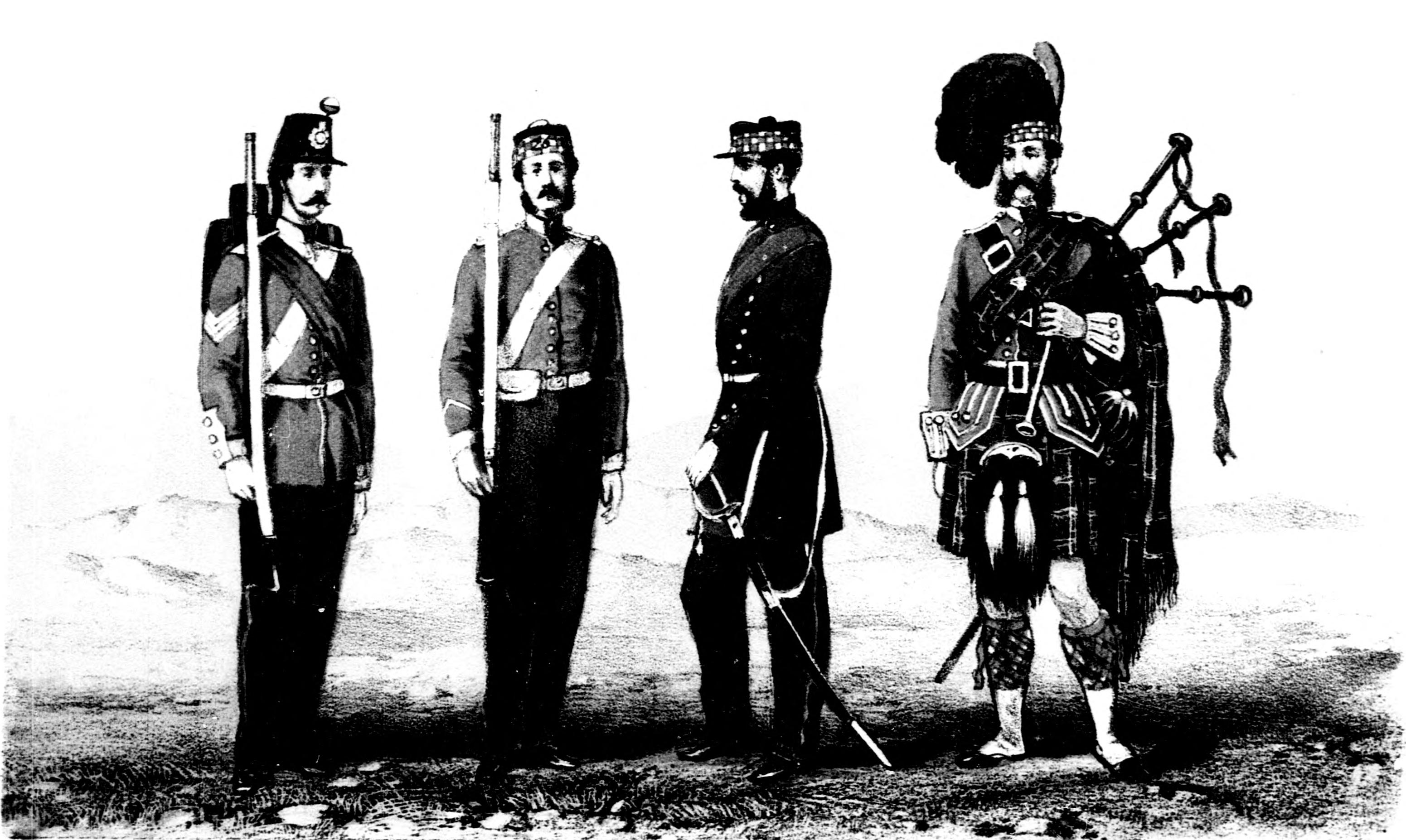
Soldiers of the 26th (Cameronian) Regiment in 1866

The main collection on show in the museum is that of the former British Army Regiment, the Cameronians (Scottish Rifles). The Cameronians were formed on 14 May 1689, with their name being in memory of Richard Cameron, "The Lion of The Covenant", a Scottish preacher who died at the Battle of Airds Moss in 1680. The Cameronians still hold the distinction of being the only regiment in the British military to have a religious origin, with their initial recruits all being Covenanters. In 1881 the 26th (Cameronian) Regiment and the 90th Perthshire Light Infantry amalgamated to form the Cameronians (Scottish Rifles). The Cameronians were the only rifle regiment in Scotland and featured in many campaigns over their almost 300 years in military service. The Cameronians are an important part of South Lanarkshire history with the regiment being based in the county for most of their history. Rounds of cuts in the military eventually resulted in the regiment being disbanded, instead of losing its identity through an amalgamation, on 14 May 1968, bringing to an end 279 years of military history.

The museum's Cameronians (Scottish Rifles) collection features many exhibits on the history of the regiment. A number of the regiment's flags and banners are on display, such as the Bluidy Banner, which Covenanting forces carried at the Battle of Bothwell Bridge in 1679. The museum also contains over 1,000 medals and awards earned by soldiers and officers from the Cameronians (Scottish Rifles), including seven Victoria Crosses.

=== Hamilton Palace ===
One of the most well-known displays in the Museum tells the story of one of the nation's lost treasures – Hamilton Palace. The Palace was the primary residence of the Hamilton family from at least 1591 until 1919, and was the largest non-royal residence in Britain. However, as a result of mining decline, it was demolished in the 1920s—one of the largest ever losses to Scottish national heritage. Many items from within the palace are on display, such as a large floor-to-ceiling mirror. The museum also contains many images of the Palace prior to its demolition in 1927.

=== Coal mining ===
Another of the museum's displays is based on coal mining. Before the late 19th century coal mining had not fully developed as an industry in Hamilton, but due to the mining boom in 1874 the prominence of coal mining in the area grew: there were 22 collieries in just the Hamilton Parish. The display in the museum looks at this period in South Lanarkshire's coal mining history and also holds a small exhibit on the Blantyre Mining Disaster of 1877 where 207 miners were killed in a firedamp explosion. This disaster is still Scotland's most fatal mining disaster.

=== Agriculture ===
Previous to the industrial revolution the primary occupation of almost all of the residents of South Lanarkshire was in agriculture. The museum's agricultural display focuses on the most famous piece of farm life in the area – the Clydesdale Horse.

=== Weaving ===
A very important industry in the history of Lanarkshire was weaving, and there was a weavers' loom in every cottage in every town and village throughout the area. One of the original weaving looms can be seen in the museum's Textile gallery. This gallery also holds information on the story of Hamilton's peculiar lacemaking industry, which was introduced in by Duchess Elizabeth in 1752.

=== Ducal buildings ===
This displays information on the history of the remaining ducal buildings in the town, including those on the museum site—Portland, the Palace Riding School, and Hamilton Mausoleum. The exhibit on the ducal buildings describes the history of these nationally important buildings and the people who built and used them.

=== Early settlement in South Lanarkshire ===
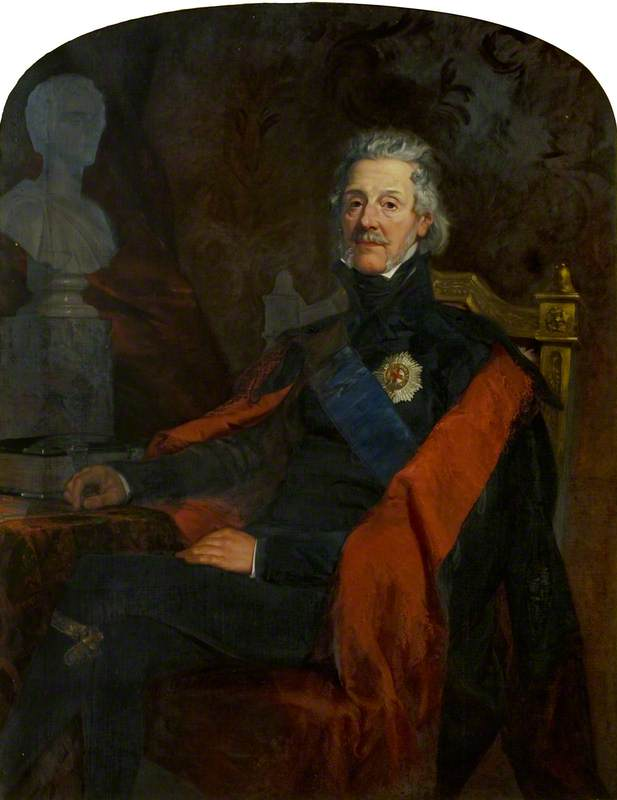
Alexander, 10th Duke of Hamilton, the subject of the exhibit 'At Home with the Duke and Duchess'

One of the most unusual and interesting objects in the Museum is a 4,000-year-old Bronze Age burial. Found during sand quarrying operations at Ferniegair in the 1930s, this well-preserved skeleton represents one of the very early residents of South Lanarkshire.

=== Previous exhibitions ===
The museum has held numerous temporary exhibitions. A robot exhibition in 2013 featured robotic characters from film and television, such as R2-D2 from Star Wars, the NS-5 robot from I, Robot, and a full size RoboCop costume. It has also previously presented artwork by Scottish Autism's Hamilton group; The Talented Young Adults with Autism in 2013 and regularly hosts demonstrations of period costumes and weaponry giving revelers the chance to take part in such activities as archery and medieval coin striking. The museum has even given a glimpse into the life of Duchess Anne and Alexander Hamilton, 10th Duke of Hamilton through the dramatized ‘At Home with the Duke and Duchess’ where professional actors took on the role of the important figureheads of Hamilton’s past.

== See also ==
- List of Category A listed buildings in South Lanarkshire
- List of listed buildings in Hamilton, South Lanarkshire
- List of museums in Scotland
