= National Museum of Rural Life =

National museum in South Lanarkshire, Scotland

Coordinates: 55°46′31.4″N 4°13′16.8″W

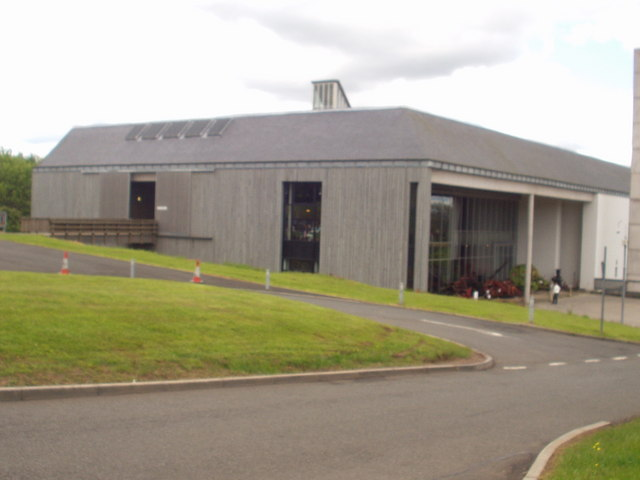
- Former name: Museum of Scottish Country Life
- Established: 2001
- Location: Wester Kittochside Farm
- Website: https://www.nms.ac.uk/national-museum-of-rural-life/

The National Museum of Rural Life, previously known as the Museum of Scottish Country Life, is based at Wester Kittochside farm, lying between East Kilbride in South Lanarkshire and Carmunnock in Glasgow. It is run by National Museums Scotland.

== Creation of the museum ==
The project, opened in 2001, cost more than £9 million and was made possible through a partnership between the National Museums of Scotland, the National Trust for Scotland, the Heritage Lottery Fund, the European Regional Development Fund, South Lanarkshire Council, Scottish Natural Heritage and a number of private funders.

The National Museum of Rural Life has greatly extended the work of the former Scottish Agricultural Museum, founded in 1949, latterly located within the Royal Highland Showground at Ingliston, west of Edinburgh.

The completed National Museum of Rural Life features a 50,000-square-foot (4,600 m^{2}) museum and visitor centre, the Georgian buildings of Wester Kittochside farm, the species-rich fields and hedgerows around it and a 24-hectare (59-acre) events area.

== Lairds of Kittochside ==
The 44-hectare (109-acre) farm was gifted in 1992 to the National Trust for Scotland by Mrs. Margaret Reid who had run the farm for many years with her late husband James, the last of ten generations of Reids. The Reids, as Lairds of Kittochside, farmed the property over a period of 400 years from 1567 to 1992.

Originally, John Reid, previously the tenant, had purchased the lands of Kittochside in 1567 from Robert Mure of Caldwell. Mure tried to take back the lands by force and after burning down Kittochside the case came to be adjudicated at the Privy Council of James VI in 1600, the result being that Robert Mure was jailed for six months but was released after paying a fine of 500 merks to John Reid with a promise of 1015 merks on 11 November 1600 and then the Reids were free to develop the farm buildings and lands.

During the covenanting troubles the Reids were prominent and they fought against the king at the Battle of Bothwell Brig in 1679. At one point in the battle the Kilbryd (Kilbride) Parish Flag was taken by the enemy and James Reid fought his way to its rescue, ripping it off its pole and wrapping it around his body as he ran with it. His brother John was captured and would have been sent to the West Indies as a slave if it were not for the intervention of the Duke of Hamilton. John was jailed for about 6 years and then returned in less violent times to manage Wester Kittochside farm.

=== The Laird's House ===
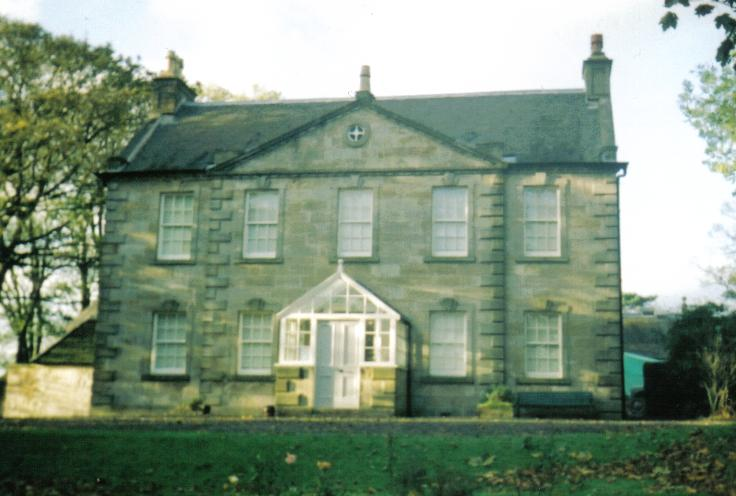
The Laird's House

The fine Georgian dwelling house was built in 1782–1784 and cost £45.12.7, not an inconsiderable sum for the time, paying for a Laird's home of almost miniature classical country house appearance. An extension to the house was built in 1906 allowing for remodelling of the interior layout. Electricity was installed in the 1950s, replacing the use of oil lamps and candles. The interior of the house has been left as it was in the 1950s.

Some of the buildings have carved ball finials on the gable ends as per the architectural fashion of the time. The finial can also function as a lightning rod, and was once believed to act as a deterrent to witches on broomsticks attempting to land on one's roof. On making her final landing approach to a roof, the witch, spotting the obstructing finial, was forced to sheer off and land elsewhere.

Both the house and the farm stand on an exposed hill top and are screened from the elements by mature trees, a particularly fine old Sycamore or Plane (Acer pseudoplatanus) being prominent amongst them.

== Wester Kittochside Farm ==
=== Farm buildings ===
The north and west ranges were built in 1782–1784 by John Reid. The north range stands on the foundations of an earlier building, probably a 17th-century longhouse. The small byre was re-roofed and upgraded in the mid 19th and early 20th centuries. The corn barn still has its threshing floor where a flail would have been used by hand until a horse-engine and threshing machine was installed in around 1820 to 1840. This was in turn replaced in 1860 by the present threshing mill. Finally around 1870 travelling mills made even this mill redundant.

The 6th laird was involved in quarrying and limestone-burning, hence the need for a stable with room for three horses and loose box, with a loft above. Various modifications took place over the years and a Dutch barn was built in 1949. Dairying ceased in 1980 and the farm turned to raising beef cattle until 1992 when the National Trust for Scotland took over the running of the farm operations.

==== Horse engine or gin ====
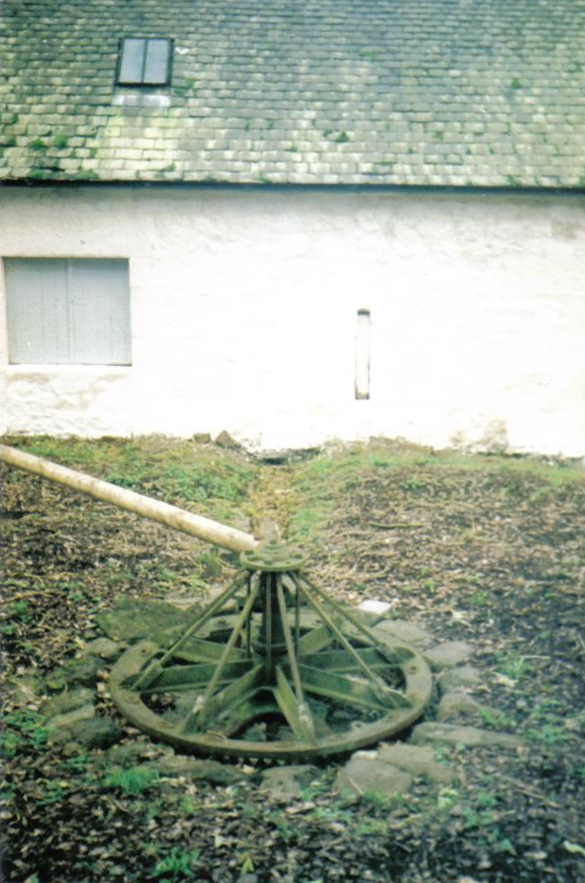
The cast-iron horse gin or horse engine

The very rare survival of a 'horse mill', engine or 'gin' at Wester Kittochside has been professionally excavated and restored to working condition. It had been used to drive farm machinery, such as the winnowing machine in the corn barn which removes the husk from grain, powered via a rotating horizontal axle drive from the gin. As already stated, prior to using horse driven machines a flail was used by the farm workers to separate the grain from the husk. The flail itself being a wood pole with a smaller pole linked at the end via a chain or leather thong. Another door opposite the existing barn door used to provide sufficient wind to separate the grain from the chaff or seed husks.

==== Bothy ====
A single room to house a bachelor farm servant was called a bothy. The example at Wester Kittochside was used as a tack room in the early 20th century, but came back into use during the Second World War when it was used as quarters for a German prisoner of war, Heinrich Luckel, who remained in contact with the Reid family for many years after the end of the conflict.

==== Doocot, cart and gig sheds ====
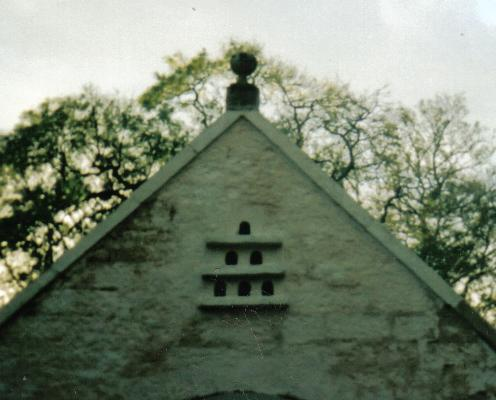
The doocot and the ball finial

A typical dovecot or doocot is located above the door of the cart shed building. The doocot is a typical feature of country estates, as the right to build one was strictly limited to the major landowners initially, and only later were small freeholders permitted to build them; at a more recent date tenants could sometimes gain permission from their landlord to build doocots to provide food or to add a picturesque feature to their properties. (Peters 2003). In the Middle Ages doocots or pigeon-houses were a badge of manorial privilege and distinctive, often very ornate buildings were constructed (Buxbaum 1987). The Kittochside doocot is a simple and practical design, however the problem of the pigeons feeding off the farm crops still had to be balanced against the benefits of the all year round meat supply that the doocot provided. A lean-to gig shed, (gig: a light, two-wheeled sprung cart pulled by one horse) was built at the north end of the stable in the early 19th century.

==== Stathel ====
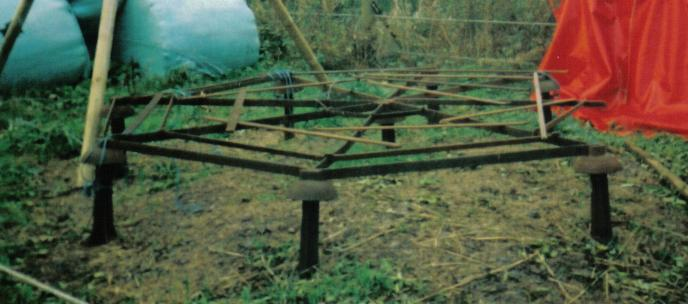
A cast-iron stathel at the farm

Wester Kittochside has two stathels, both made in Edinburgh. The structure is basically a cast-iron version of a set of staddle stones with its upper wooden framework. These rare survivals are still in use for supporting ricks, keeping the material well aired and dry underfoot, as well as free from rats and mice which cannot run up the legs of the structure and make it "up and over" the "mushroom shaped" tops and thence into the hay, etc.

==== Whin stone ====
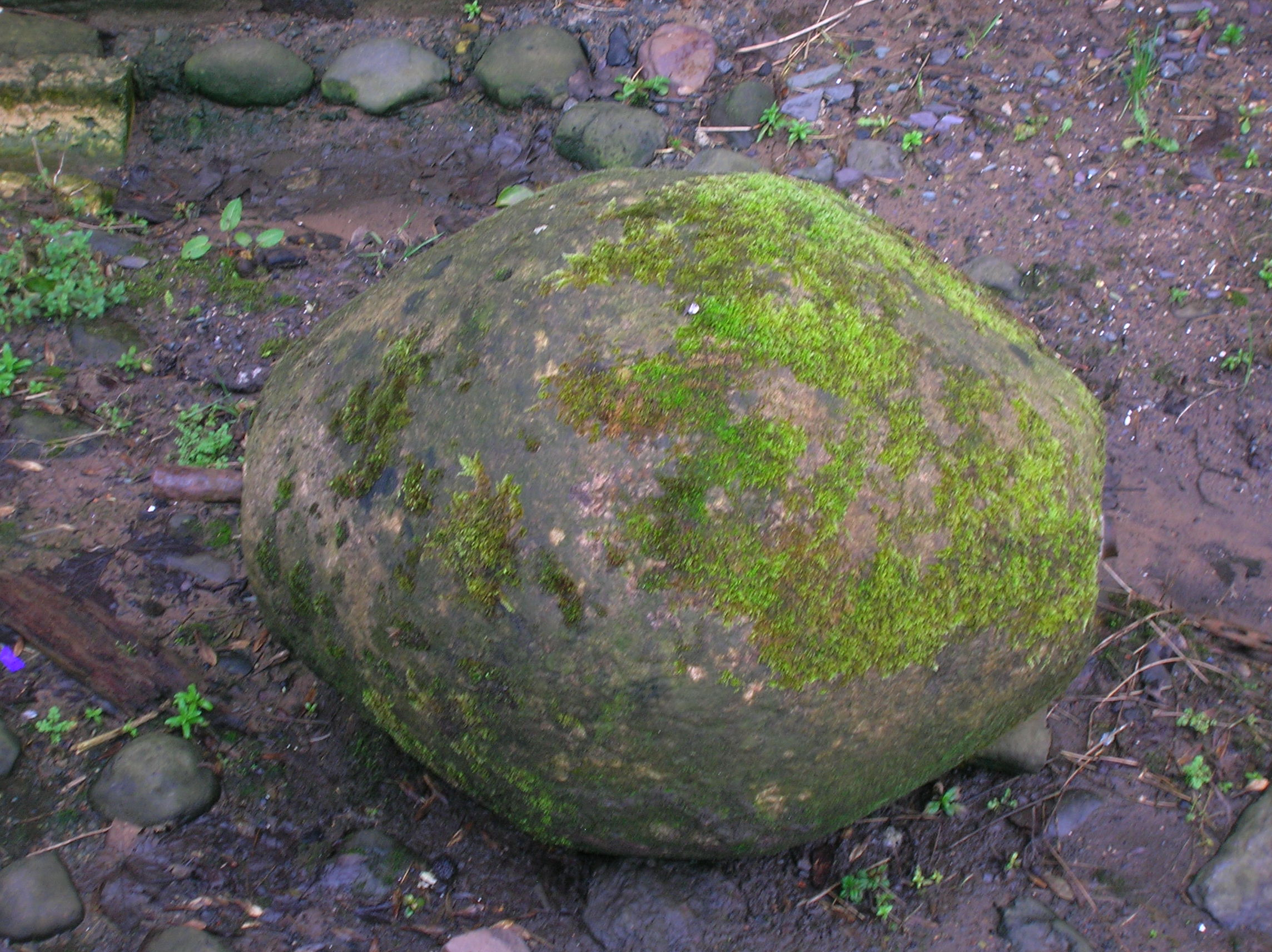
A whin stone at Dalgarven Mill, North Ayrshire

Lying outside in the farm courtyard is a large oval sandstone object with metal attachments on its central axis. This was used to crush whin or gorse in a shallow trough, the stone being dragged up and down by a horse, making the spiny and tough branches of the plant suitable for use as animal feed. It was normally only used when other sources of feed were lacking.

==== Field names ====
An interesting survival and a source of historical information, is the record of field names from the 1858 farm map, giving us such names as Buchans, Long Croft, Short Croft, Greenlawford, Fauselands, Queyspark, etc. The meaning of these names are explained in the Laird's House where an exhibition room is dedicated to the history of the Reid family and their farm.

==== Slip Gate ====
Sandstone slip gate piers are found at the bottom entry point to the Buchans field beside the pedestrian footpath. Such slip gates were built with a series of downward-facing L-shaped grooves on one side and a matching concavity on the other gatepost. Wood bars could then be inserted across and parallel, giving a gate without a hinge. These are sometimes still found in the countryside at large, but they are almost always adapted to carry metal hinged gates. In some areas wood rather than stone was used to construct this type of hinge-less gatepost.

==== Rig and furrow ====
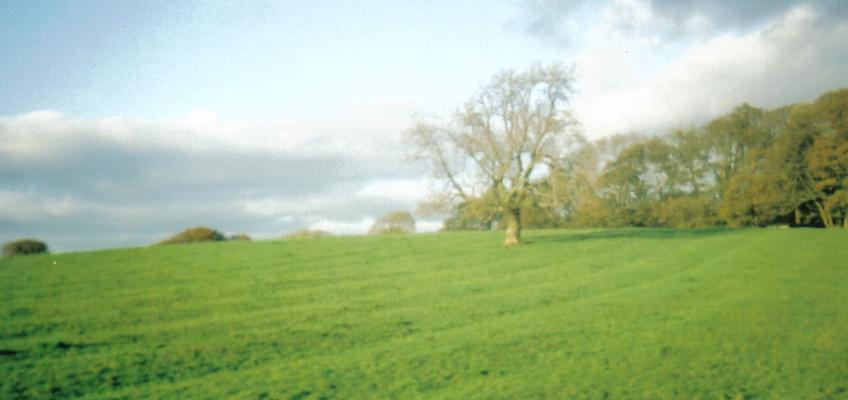
Rig and Furrow marks in Buchans Field

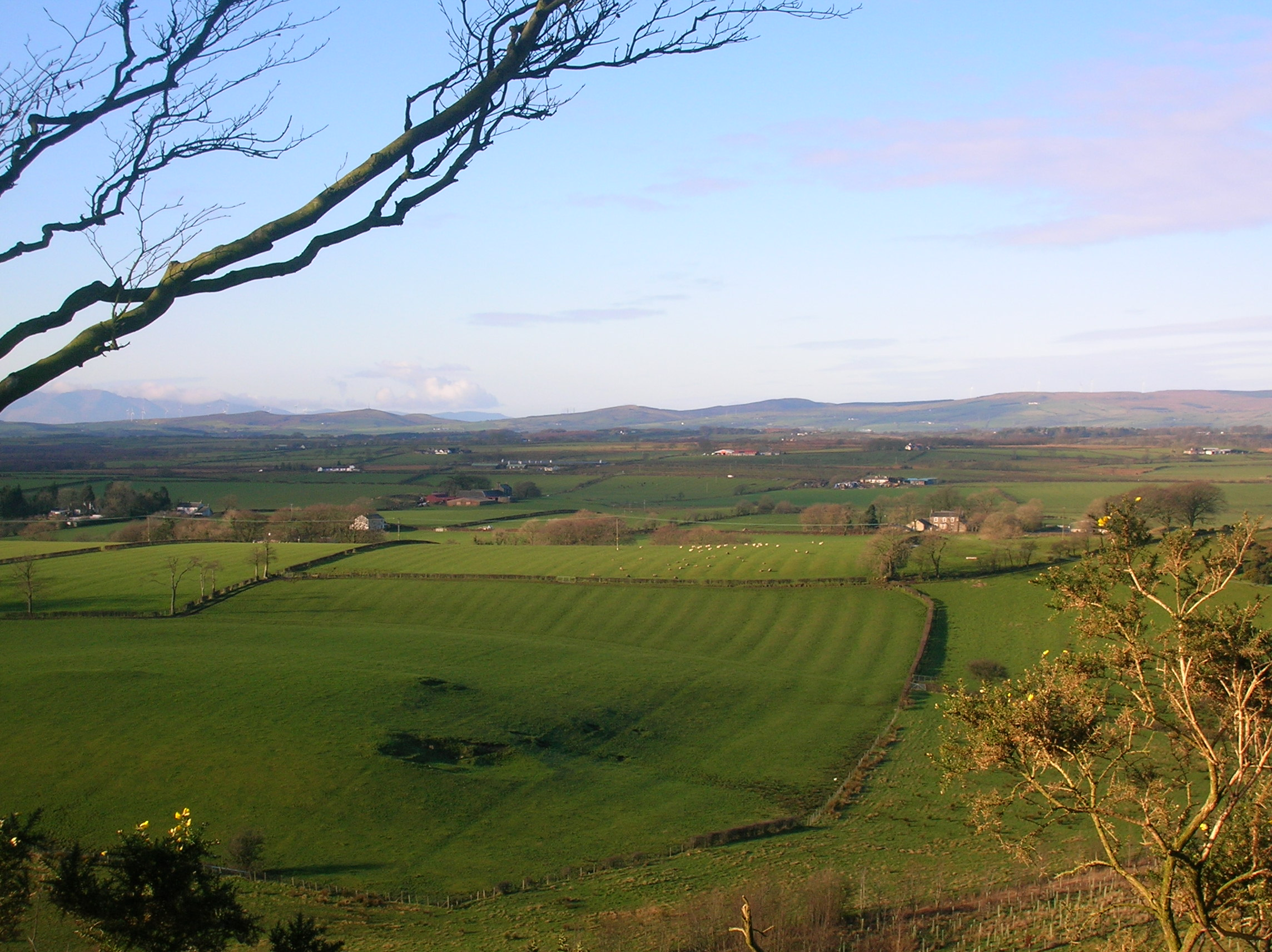
Clear 'rig & furrow' marks in a field near Aiket Castle in East Ayrshire.

The familiar rig and furrow marks in the Buchans field are exceptionally well preserved due to the fact that heavy machinery was rarely used here. These marks represent the way in which earth was built along the centre of a long strip or rig of land with drains or furrows at either side. This is how crops were grown up until the 17th century before enclosure with hedges and fences took place, as well as great social changes, improved farm machinery, etc., all of which altered the way in which fields were ploughed and managed (Blair 1976).

==== Archaeology ====
As part of Scottish Archaeology Month in September 2005, 50 volunteers took part in a fieldwalking exercise to the SW of Wester Kittochside Farm (NS65NW 72). An area of 110 x 20 m was gridded out in 10 m squares, and the volunteers spent 5 minutes in each grid collecting all the visible artefacts.

Most of the artefacts recovered are of 19th-century origin. These include white and brown glazed pottery, stoneware, bottle and window glass, porcelain figurines, clay pipes and roof slates. More unusual finds include beads, buttons, burnt bone, lead toy soldiers, medieval green-glaze pottery and flint. Most of these items would probably have come from the night soil deposited on the midden and then spread with the manure from the farmyard midden.

== Exhibition building and collections ==
The Exhibition Building was designed by Page\Park Architects and constructed in 1998–2001 on newly purchased land. It is designed to reflect its links with the world of agricultural and nature, with large sliding entrance doors giving access to a wood-clad barn-like building. The other outer walls appear to be 'white-washed' and the lower portion of almost the whole of one side appears to be open to the ground outside, echoing the design of typical barns, cart sheds, etc.

The three main themes to the museum are land, tools and people. Many of the artifacts and equipment originally came from the existing museum at Ingliston, others came from an operational traditional working farm, as well as items which were donated and some which were specific acquisitions. The displays illustrate how people lived and worked the land in the past, and how this helped shape the countryside which we see today. The museum also includes items which highlight the folklore aspects of the farming way of life, including a 'cup marked' stone, a collection of charms and many other display items.

Specifically themed exhibitions include agricultural tools and equipment, clothing, toys, musical instruments, and household items. Amongst the preserved machinery is the reaping machine invented by Patrick Bell (1799–1869), the earliest surviving example of an iron plough invented by James Small (1730–1793) and the best collection of combine harvesters in Europe, mostly housed in an area which can be visited upon request.

The High Breck of Rendall Mill is a permanent exhibit. It is the oldest known surviving threshing mill in the world.

The museum has a large collection of scale and other models from the Highland Society and other sources relating to farm machinery, water wheels, etc.

== Visitor experience ==
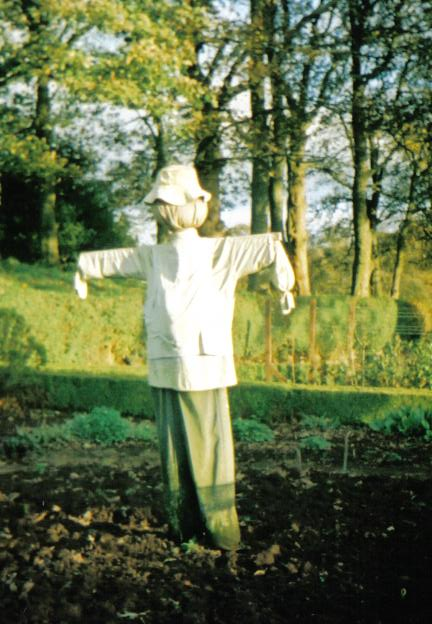
The Scarecrow in the kitchen garden at the farmhouse

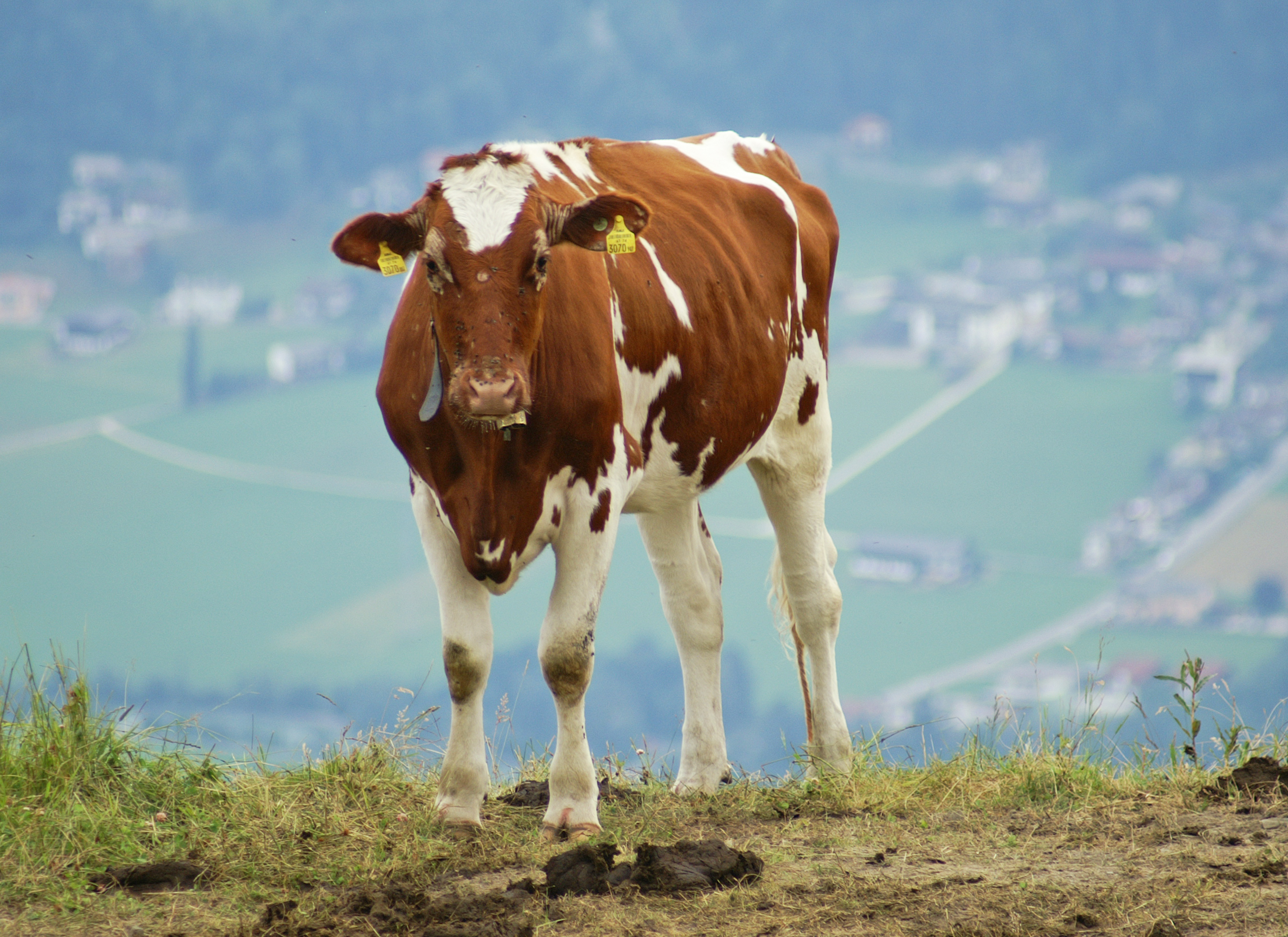
An Ayrshire calf

A day at the National Museum of Rural Life gives an opportunity for visitors to get back to the land and experience the traditional way of life as it was on the rural and partly mechanised Scottish farm of the 1950s. Ploughing, sowing, haymaking and harvesting are all carried out on this working farm. Interpretation guides enable visitors to understand and appreciate the many activities which are part and parcel of the Scottish farming year. Tractor rides take visitors to the farm where they can also see the herd of pedigree Ayrshire cattle which calve from January–March being milked every day at 3.00 pm and the Kittochside flock of Scottish blackface ewes (sheep) which lamb in early April.

An annual programme is offered of demonstrations of country skills, workshops and ranger-guided walks. Activities are spread throughout the year, such as the heavy horse show, the tractor show, the horse shoeing competition, the sheepdog trials, Kittochside Fair, Toytrac Scotland, Christmas at the Farm, the Halloween Party, Willow Harvest, etc. The museum received 113,525 visitors in 2019.

== Kittochglen and Philipshill Mill ==
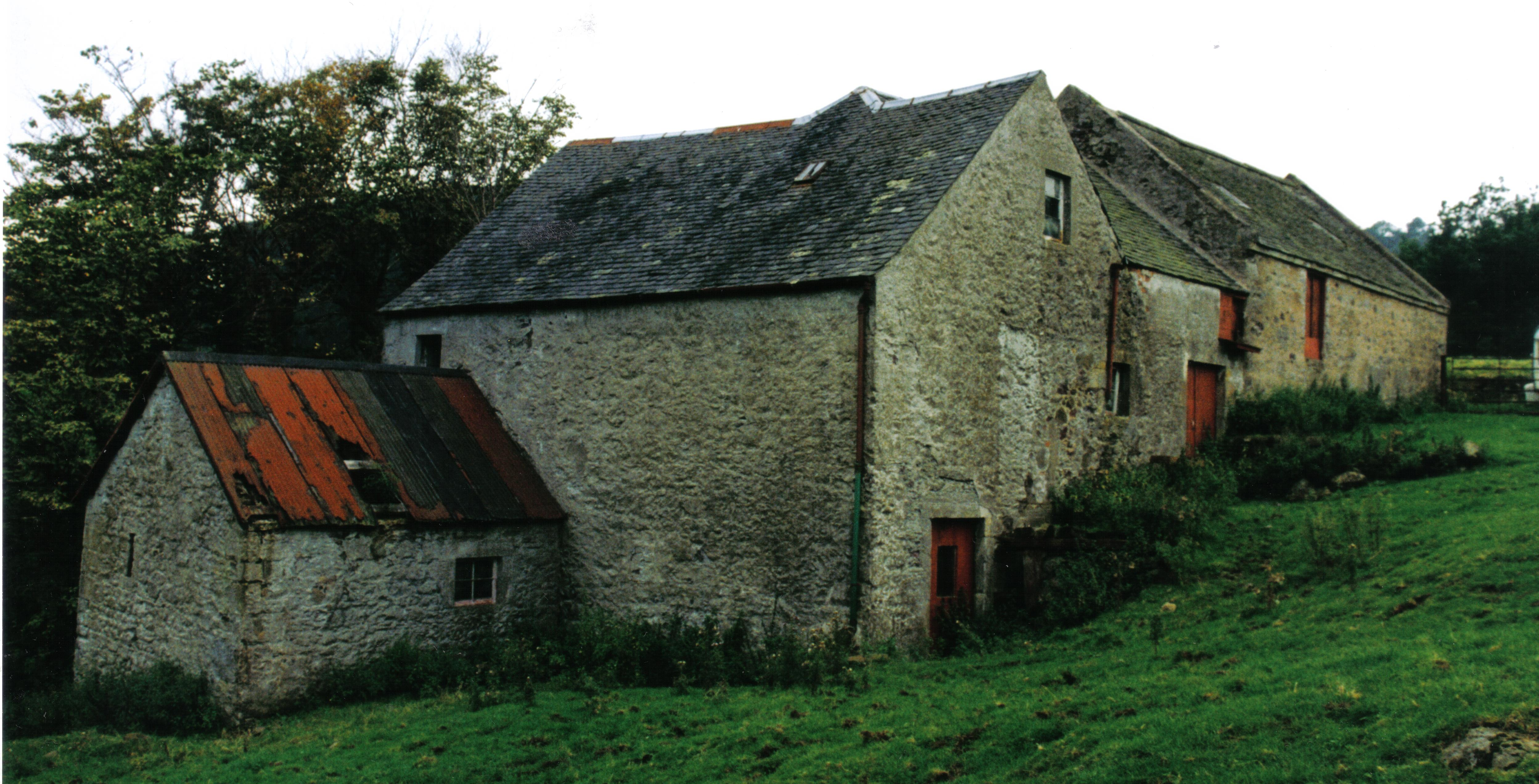
Typical mill buildings, here at Coldstream Mill in North Ayrshire.

Below the Exhibition Building is the glen through which the Kittoch Water runs, previously powering the grain mill which stood on the further bank of the Kittoch Water. The mill cottage still stands and the Weir is visible further up the glen looking towards the road bridge. It had a cast iron wheel, providing a direct link with the MoSRL and its collection of wheelwright's patterns for waterwheels exhibited in the land gallery of the Exhibition Building.

== Education ==
The museum provides a national educational resource on countryside practices, biodiversity, the environment, traditional and more recent farming methods involving pesticides and fertilisers, topical issues, etc. It focuses on the long history of agriculture in Scotland and on the lives of those who lived and worked in the countryside.

== See also ==
- Dalgarven Mill The Ayrshire Museum of Country Life and Costume.
- Staddle stones
- Painted pebbles
- Dunlop cheese
- List of Category A listed buildings in South Lanarkshire
- List of listed buildings in East Kilbride, South Lanarkshire
- Royal Commission on the Ancient and Historical Monuments of Scotland
- A Researcher's Guide to Local History terminology
