= South Lanarkshire =

Council area of Scotland

South Lanarkshire: Siorrachd Lannraig a Deas (Scottish Gaelic); Sooth Lanrikshire (Scots)
- Council area
- Flag Coat of arms
- Motto: Latin: Vigilantia, lit. 'Watchfulness'
- South Lanarkshire shown within Scotland
- Coordinates: 55°36′N 3°47′W
- Sovereign state: United Kingdom
- Country: Scotland
- Lieutenancy area: Lanarkshire
- Unitary authority: 1 April 1996
- Administrative HQ: Lanark County Buildings

Government
  - Type: Council
  - Body: South Lanarkshire Council
  - Control: No overall control
  - MPs: 4 MPs: David Mundell (C); Joani Reid (I); Imogen Walker (L); Michael Shanks (L)
  - MSPs: 5 MSPs: Màiri McAllan (SNP); Collette Stevenson (SNP); Christina McKelvie (SNP); Clare Haughey (SNP); Stephanie Callaghan (SNP)

Area
  - Total: 684 sq mi (1,772 km^{2})
  - Rank: 11th

Population (2025)
  - Total: 334,330
  - Rank: 5th
  - Density: 490/sq mi (189/km^{2})
- Time zone: UTC+0 (GMT)
  - Summer (DST): UTC+1 (BST)
- ISO 3166 code: GB-SLK
- GSS code: S12000029
- Website: southlanarkshire.gov.uk

South Lanarkshire (Scots: Sooth Lanrikshire; Scottish Gaelic: Siorrachd Lannraig a Deas) is one of 32 unitary authorities of Scotland. It borders the south-east of the Glasgow City council area and contains some of Greater Glasgow's suburban towns, as well as many rural towns and villages. It also shares borders with Dumfries and Galloway, East Ayrshire, East Renfrewshire, North Lanarkshire, the Scottish Borders and West Lothian. It includes most of the historic county of Lanarkshire.

The administrative centre of South Lanarkshire is Hamilton, with the seat of the local authority, South Lanarkshire Council, located at Lanark County Buildings.

== History ==
South Lanarkshire covers the southern part of the historic county of Lanarkshire. Lanarkshire had existed as a shire from around the time of King David I, who ruled Scotland from 1124 to 1153. The county took its name from the original county town at Lanark, which had been the site of the first Parliament of Scotland under Kenneth II in 978.

Local government was reformed in 1975 under the Local Government (Scotland) Act 1973, which replaced Scotland's counties, burghs and landward districts with a two-tier structure of upper-tier regions and lower-tier districts. Lanarkshire became part of the Strathclyde region, which was divided in 19 districts.

South Lanarkshire was created in 1996, when the regions and districts created in 1975 were replaced with single-tier council areas. South Lanarkshire covered the whole area of three of the abolished Strathclyde districts, being Clydesdale, East Kilbride and Hamilton, plus an area including Rutherglen and Cambuslang from the City of Glasgow district. The Rutherglen and Cambuslang area was included following a referendum on whether to stay in Glasgow or become part of the new South Lanarkshire council area.

== Geography ==
The large and varied geographical territory takes in rural and upland areas, market towns such as Lanark, Strathaven and Carluke, the urban burghs of Rutherglen, Cambuslang, and East Kilbride which was Scotland's first new town.

== Governance ==
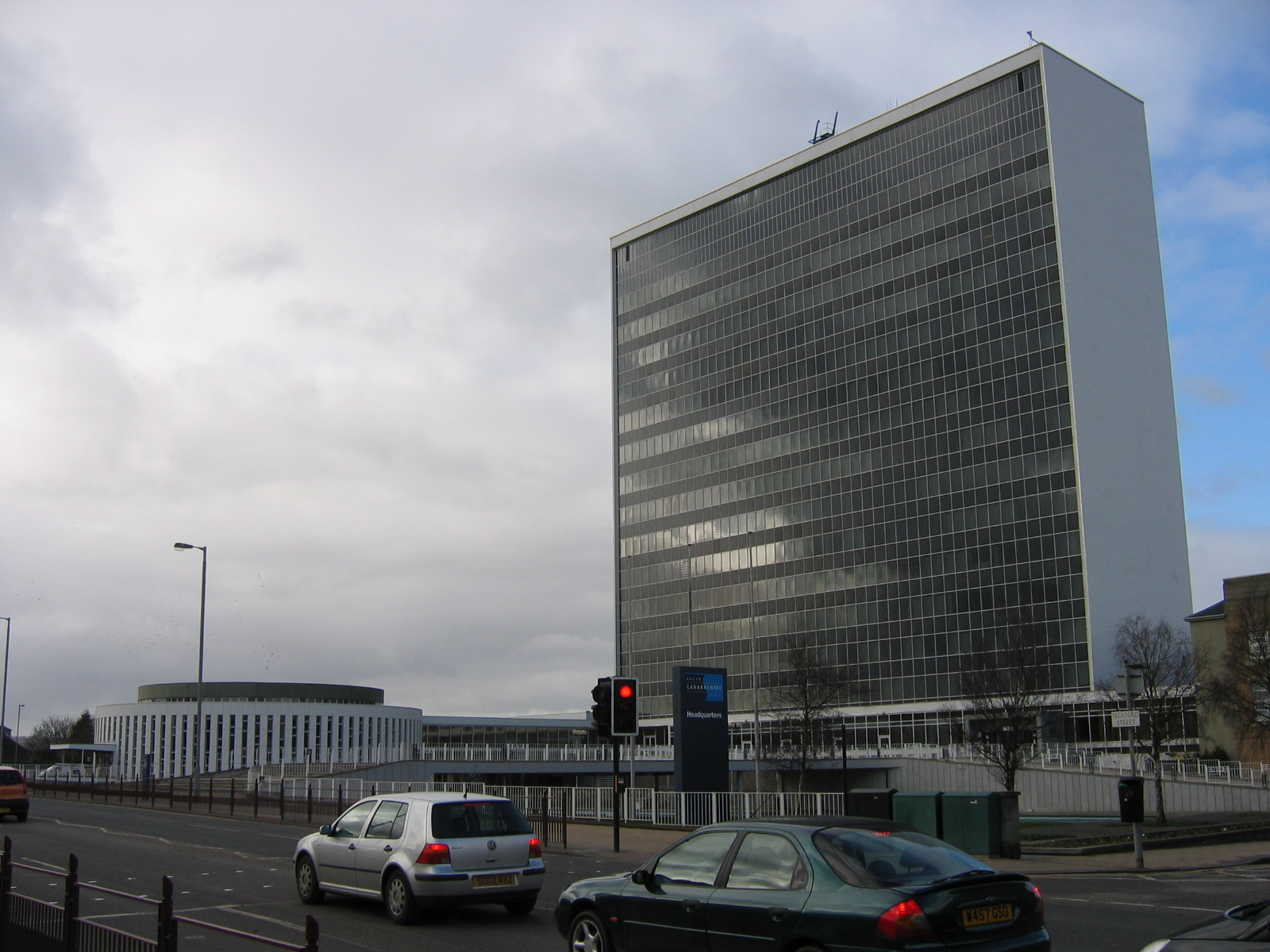
Lanark County Buildings, HQ of South Lanarkshire Council

South Lanarkshire is served by South Lanarkshire Council. The council has its headquarters in Hamilton at the Lanark County Buildings. The building, situated on Almada Street, was built as the Lanark County Buildings in 1963, and designed by county architect David Gordon Bannerman. The 17 storey, 200 feet (61 m) tower is the tallest building in the council area, is Category A-listed, and is a highly visible landmark across this part of the Clyde Valley. The modernist design was influenced by the United Nations building in New York City. At the front of the building is the circular council chamber, and a plaza with water features. Between 1975 and 1996 the building had been used as a sub-regional office of Strathclyde Regional Council, with Hamilton District Council using Hamilton Townhouse in that time. On the creation of South Lanarkshire Council in 1996 the new council chose to base itself at the Almada Street building.

Since the 2007 South Lanarkshire Council election, there are 20 council wards in South Lanarkshire, each serving a population ranging from 13,000 to 20,000 and each ward represented on the council by 3 or 4 councillors elected using single transferable vote; in 2007 and 2012 this produced a total of 67 available seats, which was adjusted down to 64 in 2017 along with boundary adjustments, although the same number of wards overall. The most recent election saw the Scottish National Party again returned with the most seats at 27 but remained shy of an overall majority. Labour made small gains to again finish second with an increased number of members with 24 – up two from 2017 – while the Conservatives lost half their number to return seven members. The Liberal Democrats and independents both made two gains to return three and two members respectively while the Greens won their first ever seat in South Lanarkshire. On 18 May, Labour and the Lib Dems announced that they would run the council as a coalition, alongside one independent councillor, with support from the Conservatives.

== Economy ==
In 2022, it was estimated that South Lanarkshire was home to 9,500 businesses, primarily within the food and drink, construction, manufacturing, Health & Social Care and logistics sectors. The area has the highest percentages of positive destination rates across Scotland for young people leaving secondary education, and the local authority consistently outperforms other local authorities across Scotland in new housing completions.

In December 2023, South Lanarkshire's employment rate was 77.1%, higher than the Scottish average, with roughly 4,700 (2.9%) people in South Lanarkshire unemployed in December 2023. This marked a decrease in the unemployment rate in South Lanarkshire, with the percentage of unemployed in the area standing at 3.3% in the previous year (December 2022).

Economic inactivity in South Lanarkshire is lower than it is across Scotland, with 42,300 people (21.2%) of the South Lanarkshire population being classed as "economically inactive" in December 2023, in comparison to 34,500 people (17.6%) in December 2022. In Scotland as a whole, 22.5% were classed as economically inactive in December 2023.

== Education ==
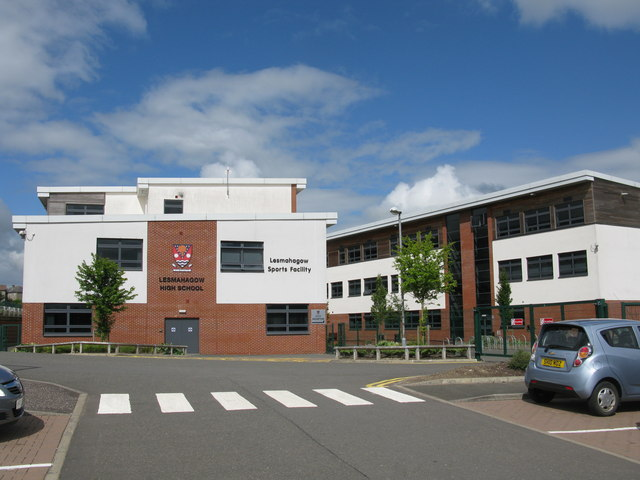
Lesmahagow High School in Lesmahagow

In 2003, South Lanarkshire Council embarked on a Schools Modernisation Programme, which envisioned all school estates being either rebuilt or refurbished and modernised. These include 124 primary schools – including 62 with nursery classes and 16 Additional Support Needs (ASN) bases; 17 secondary schools; 12 nursery centres; four ASN primary schools; three ASN secondary schools; and 15 community rooms or wings within the primary school builds. The total cost is about £1.2 billion.

The final primary school to be rebuilt was Black Mount Primary, which officially opened in October 2019 (although a new school for the expanding area of Jackton was opened in 2023). At the beginning of 2024, the project was fully completed with the completion of the Early Learning Unit in Hamilton, which is a specialist nursery catering for mainstream and ASN children. At the peak of the project, about nine nurseries and primary schools were being rebuilt each year. It is thought that this was the largest schools modernisation project in Europe, and that the council now has the most modern, well-equipped primary school estate in the whole of Europe.

There are currently about 46,000 children - 15,000 primary and 19,000 secondary pupils - in the school system in South Lanarkshire.

Gaelic Medium Education is offered at Mount Cameron Primary School and Calderglen High School, both in East Kilbride.

=== Secondary education ===
- Biggar High School
- Calderglen High School
- Calderside Academy
- Carluke High School
- Cathkin High School
- Duncanrig Secondary School
- Fernhill School
- Hamilton College
- Hamilton Grammar School
- Holy Cross High School
- John Ogilvie High School
- Lanark Grammar School
- Larkhall Academy
- Lesmahagow High School
- Rutherglen High School
- Williamwood High School
- Sanderson High School
- St Andrew's and St Bride's High School
- Stonelaw High School
- Strathaven Academy
- Trinity High School
- Uddingston Grammar School

=== Tertiary education ===
- South Lanarkshire College
- University of the West of Scotland (formerly Bell College, University Of Paisley)

== Demographics ==
Ethnic Group	2001		2011		2022	
Ethnic Group	Number	%	Number	%	Number	%
White: Total	298,812	98.87%	306,625	97.70%	313,148	95.75%
White: Scottish	283,624	93.85%	287,491	91.61%	285,577	87.32%
White: Other British	10,223	3.38%	12,068	3.85%	17,882	5.47%
White: Irish	2,678	0.89%	3,187	1.02%	3,078	0.94%
White: Gypsy/Traveller (Note: New category created for the 2011 census)	–	–	203	0.06%	158	0.05%
White: Polish	–	–	1,140	0.36%	2,225	0.68%
White: Other	2,287	0.76%	2,536	0.81%	4,225	1.29%
Asian, Asian Scottish or Asian British: Total	2,416	0.80%	5,156	1.64%	8,119	2.48%
Asian, Asian Scottish or Asian British: Indian	536	0.18%	1,344	0.43%	2,033	0.62%
Asian, Asian Scottish or Asian British: Pakistani	968	0.32%	2,117	0.67%	3,972	1.21%
Asian, Asian Scottish or Asian British: Bangladeshi	29	–	93	–	99	–
Asian, Asian Scottish or Asian British: Chinese	718	0.24%	1,012	0.32%	1,055	0.32%
Asian, Asian Scottish or Asian British: Asian Other	165	0.05%	590	0.19%	960	0.29%
Black, Black Scottish or Black British (Note: Category restructured for the 2011 census)	43	–	–	–	–	–
African: Total	111	–	664	0.21%	1,805	0.55%
African: African, African Scottish or African British	–	–	637	0.20%	167	0.05%
African: Other African	–	–	27	–	1,636	0.50%
Caribbean or Black: Total	–	–	207	0.07%	224	0.07%
Caribbean	48	–	108	–	66	–
Black	–	–	67	–	14	–
Caribbean or Black: Other	–	–	32	–	144	–
Mixed or multiple ethnic groups: Total	482	0.16%	779	0.25%	2,439	0.75%
Other: Total	304	0.10%	399	0.13%	1,321	0.40%
Other: Arab	–	–	232	0.07%	443	0.14%
Other: Any other ethnic group	–	–	167	0.05%	878	0.27%
Total:	302,216	100.00%	313,830	100.00%	327,056	100.00%

=== Languages ===
The 2022 Scottish Census reported that out of 317,750 residents aged three and over, 103,190 (32.5%) considered themselves able to speak or read the Scots language.

The 2022 Scottish Census reported that out of 317,755 residents aged three and over, 2,592 (0.8%) considered themselves able to speak or read Gaelic.

== Settlements ==
The largest settlements in South Lanarkshire

Largest settlements by population:

Settlement	Population (2020)
East Kilbride	75,310
Hamilton	54,480
Rutherglen	30,950
Cambuslang	30,790
Blantyre	16,800
Larkhall	15,030
Carluke	13,810
Lanark	8,880
Strathaven	8,090
Bothwell	6,870
Uddingston	6,300
Stonehouse	5,550
Kirkmuirhill and Blackwood	4,380
Lesmahagow	4,300
Law	3,090
Biggar	2,640

== Places of interest ==
- Biggar & Upper Clydesdale Museum
- Bothwell Castle
- Calderglen Country Park, East Kilbride
- Chatelherault Country Park, Hamilton, including Cadzow Castle
- Clyde Valley
- Craignethan Castle
- The David Livingstone Centre, Blantyre
- Dollan Aqua Centre, East Kilbride
- Falls of Clyde
- Greenhall Estate/Country Park; contains ruins of Greenhall mansion and industrial relics.
- Hamilton Mausoleum
- Jackton distillery
- James Hamilton Heritage Park, East Kilbride
- The John Hastie Museum, Strathaven
- Lanark Loch
- Langlands Moss nature reserve
- Little Sparta, near Dunsyre, Lanark
- Low Parks Museum, Hamilton
- The National Museum of Rural Life, a part of National Museums Scotland
- New Lanark, a World Heritage Site
- Rutherglen Town Hall and medieval church tower
- Sites of the Battle of Drumclog and the Battle of Bothwell Bridge
- Strathaven Castle
- The Tunnock's factory, Uddingston
- Wilsontown Ironworks

== See also ==
- List of Category A listed buildings in South Lanarkshire
- Routes To Work South
- Scheduled monuments in South Lanarkshire
