= Scheduled monuments in South Lanarkshire =

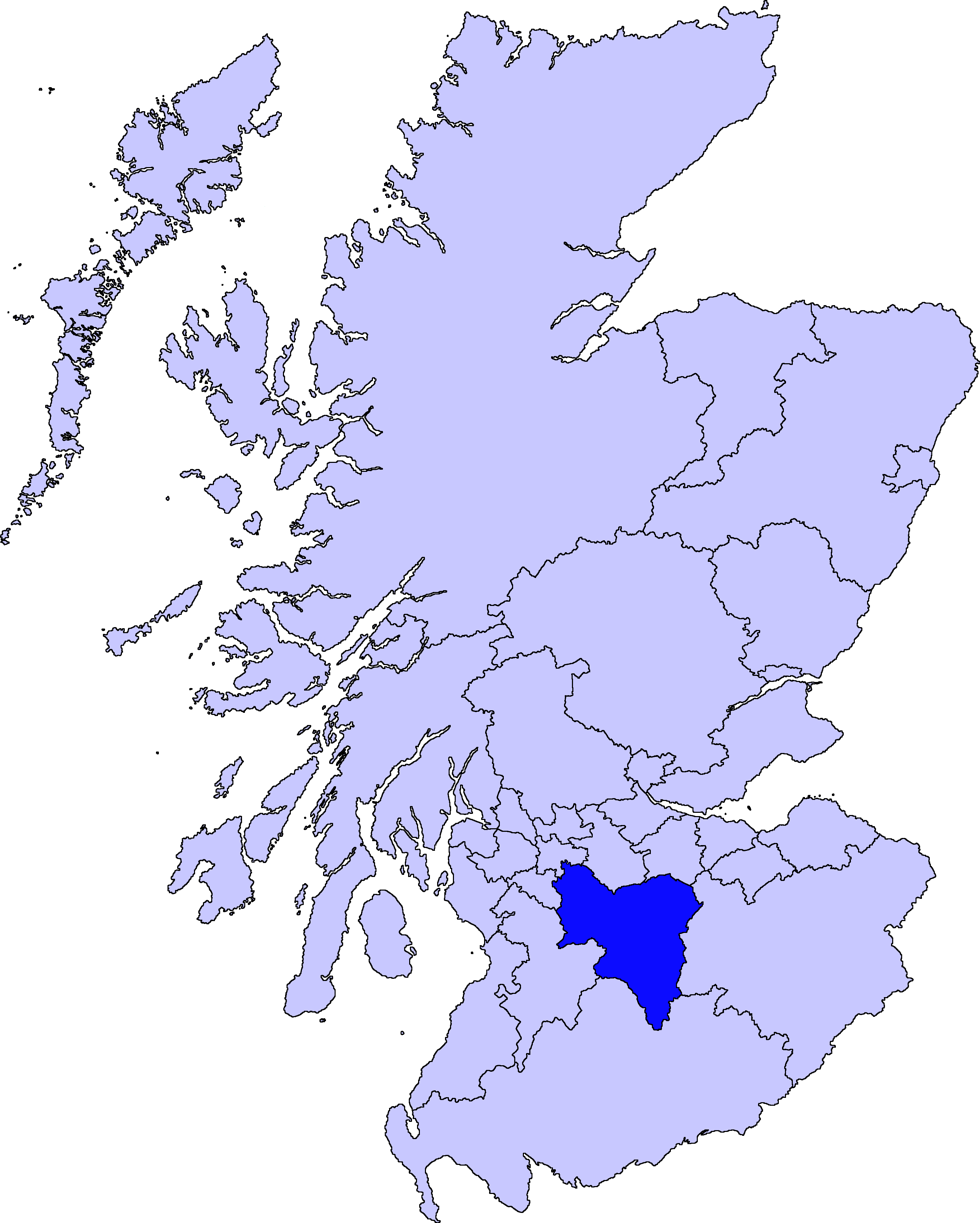
South Lanarkshire shown within Scotland

A scheduled monument in Scotland is a nationally important archaeological site or monument which is given legal protection by being placed on a list (or "schedule") maintained by Historic Environment Scotland. The aim of scheduling is to preserve the country's most significant sites and monuments as far as possible in the form in which they have been inherited.

The process of scheduling is governed by the Ancient Monuments and Archaeological Areas Act 1979, which aims "to make provision for the investigation, preservation and recording of matters of archaeological or historical interest". The term "scheduled monument" can apply to the whole range of archaeological sites which have been deliberately constructed by human activity but are not always visible above ground. They range from prehistoric standing stones and burial sites, through Roman remains and medieval structures such as castles and monasteries, to later structures such as industrial sites and buildings constructed for the World Wars. Some buildings or structures which were both scheduled and listed have had their listing designations removed to reduce the duplication.

In 2017 there were 8238 scheduled monuments in Scotland.

== Notable Scheduled Monuments in South Lanarkshire ==
Name	Location	Description	Ref No	Image
Hallbar Tower	Crawford	Barmkin associated with Hallbar Tower	SM1148	
Corra Castle	Lesmahagow	Ruined tower-house	SM2597	
Avondale Castle	Avondale	Ruined castle	SM2619	
Crawford Castle or Lindsay Tower	Crawford	Ruined castle	SM2633	
Normangill Henge	Crawford	Prehistoric henge cut through by road	SM3292	
Couthally Castle	Carnwath	Ruined 12th-century L-plan castle	SM3909	
Gilbertfield Castle	Cambuslang	Ruined 17th-century L-shaped mansion	SM5270	
Bothwell Castle	Bothwell	Ruined 13th-century castle	SM90038	
Craignethan Castle	Lesmahagow	Standing medieval castle	SM90083	
St Bride's Church	Douglas	Ruined church with standing south aisle and octagonal clock tower	SM90265	
Cadzow Castle	Hamilton	Ruins of late medieval castle	SM90342	

== See also ==
- List of Category A listed buildings in South Lanarkshire
