= Rutherglen Town Hall =

Municipal building in Rutherglen, Scotland

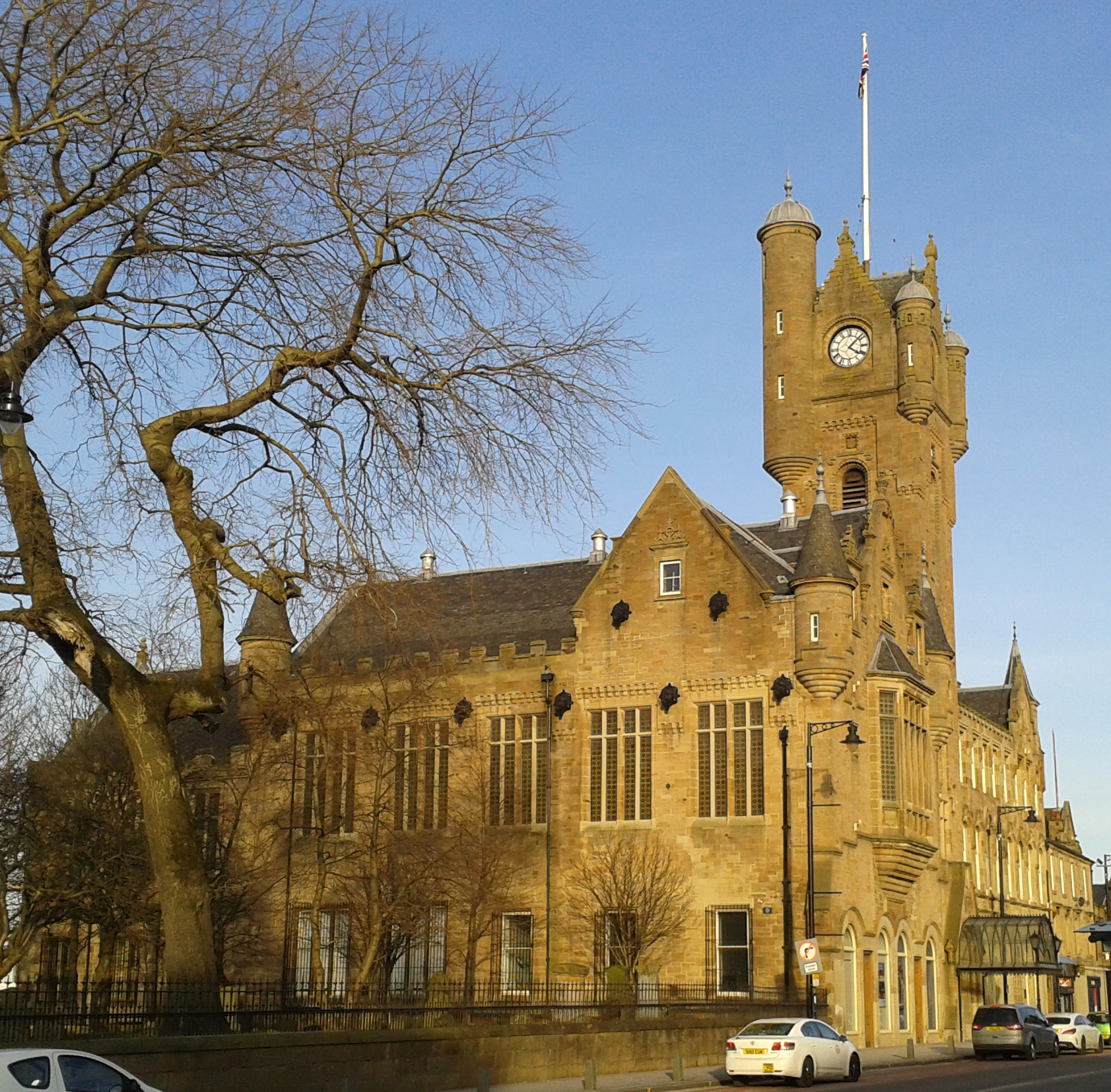
- Rutherglen Town Hall

- Shown in South Lanarkshire
- 55.8286°N 4.2144°W
- Location: 139-143 Main Street; Rutherglen; G73 2JJ

History
- Built: 1862

Site notes
- Architect: Charles Wilson
- Architectural style: Scottish baronial style

Listed Building – Category A
- Designated: 4 March 1971
- Reference no.: LB33564

Rutherglen Town Hall is a municipal facility on the north side of Main Street in Rutherglen, Scotland. The town hall, which was the headquarters of Rutherglen Burgh Council, is a Category A listed building.

== History ==
The current building was commissioned to replace an earlier town hall, known latterly as "the old jail", which had been completed in 1766. After significant population expansion associated with the growth in the mining industry, civic leaders decided to procure a new town hall although the two structures coexisted almost alongside each other until 1900.

The foundation stone for the new building was laid by with full masonic honours by Sir Archibald Alison on 16 July 1861. It was designed by Charles Wilson in the Scottish baronial style and completed in 1862. The design involved an asymmetrical frontage of five bays facing Main Street; the left hand section of four bays featured four round-headed windows on the ground floor and a large oriel window on the first floor with a gable above; the right hand bay featured a doorway with a gable head and a prominent 110 feet (34 m) four-sided asymmetric clock tower with corner bartizans. On either side of the oriel window carved panels were erected, one with "circa David I 1126" and the other with "circa William I 1189", as reminders of the dates when ancient privileges were awarded to the town. The building was extended to the east by an extra eight bays to the designs of Robert Dalgleish and John Thomson in 1877 and an iron canopy was erected outside the doorway in 1902. Internally, the principal rooms were the council chambers, a courtroom and a public hall.

The town hall was the seat of government of Rutherglen Burgh Council until it was gutted during a conversion to offices in 1967, and became surplus to requirements after the town was absorbed into Glasgow District under the Local Government (Scotland) Act 1973 in May 1975. It was then closed to the public in the 1980s and fell into a state of disrepair. The building was refurbished and extended with the addition of a twin-level glass atrium to the rear at a cost of £12 million (supported by Historic Scotland and the Heritage Lottery Fund for Scotland) in 2004. It continues to be used as a venue for weddings, theatrical performances and exhibitions, while still providing some local services such as the Licensing and Registration Office.

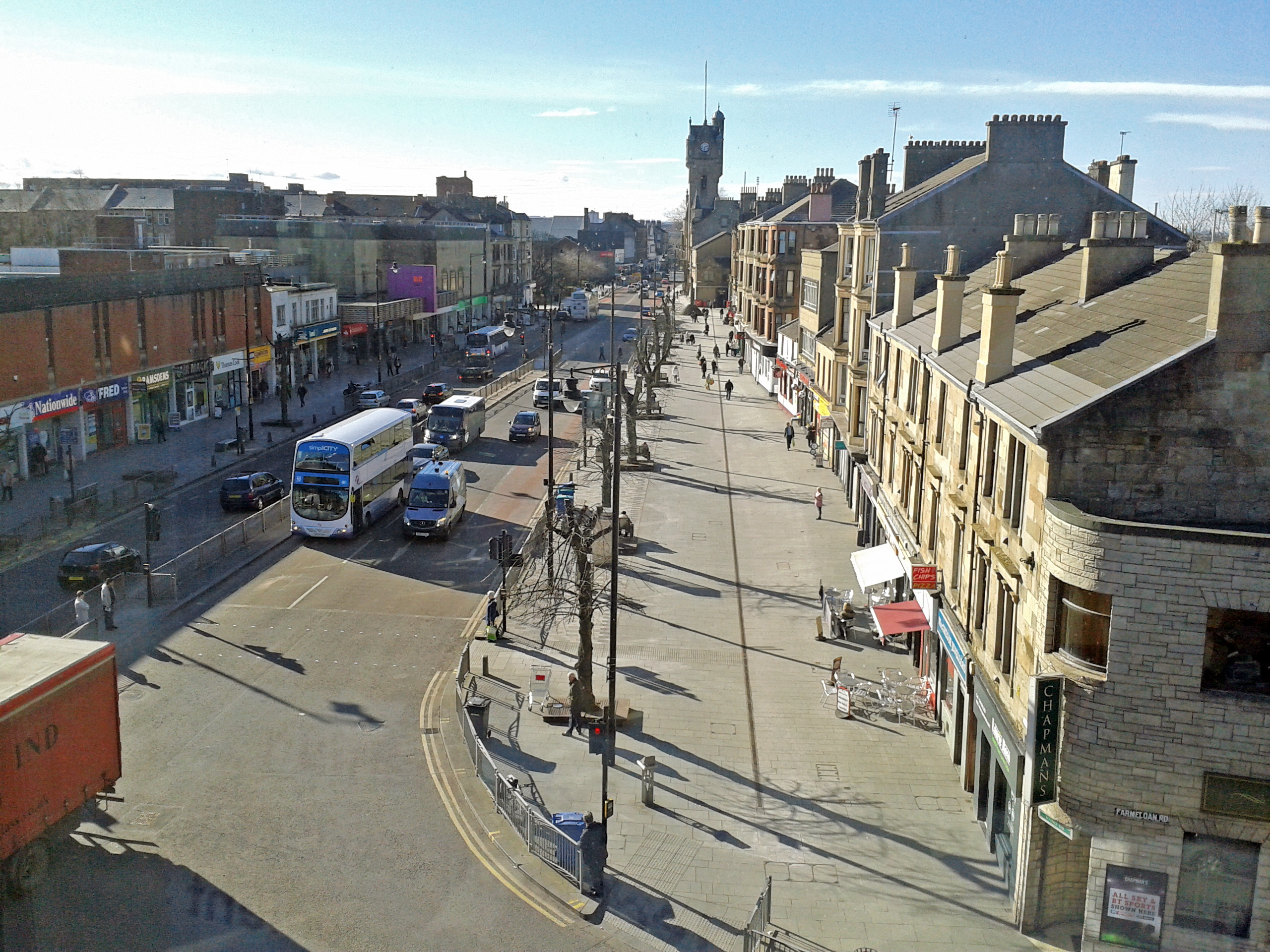
Elevated view of Main Street from the east with the tower of the town hall prominent

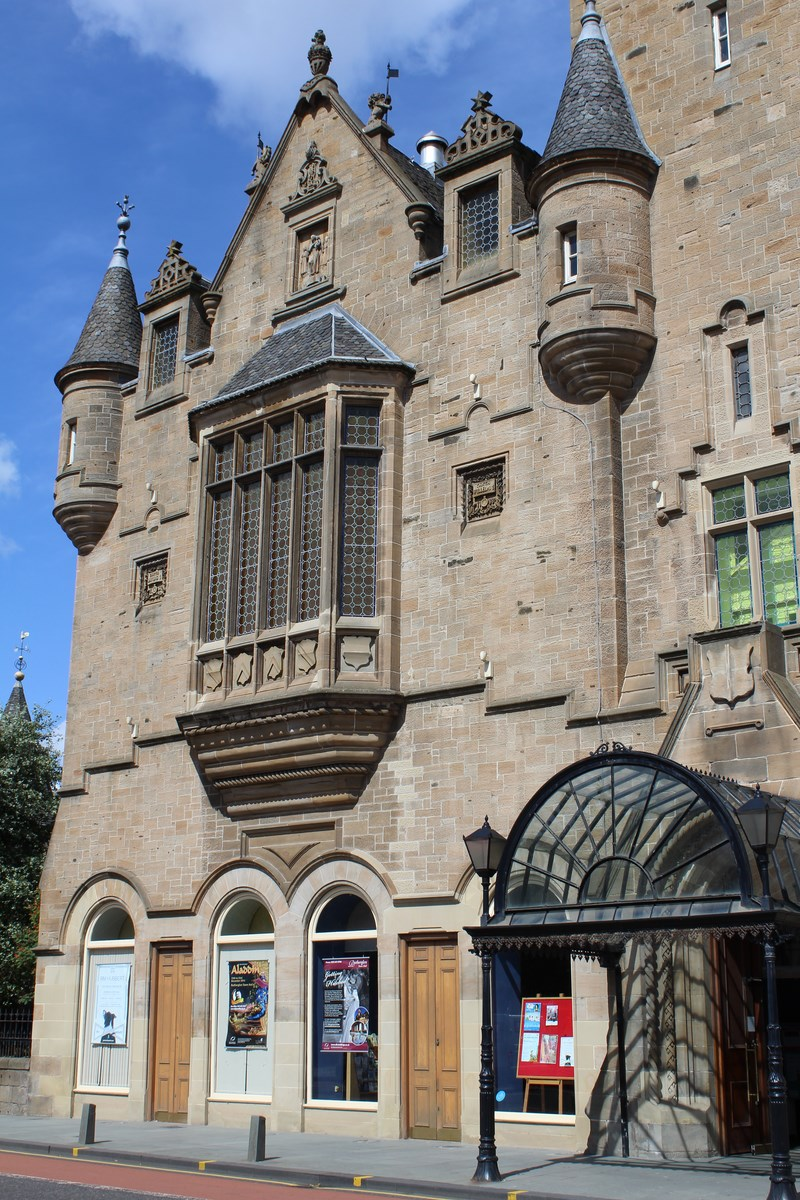
Exterior detail of the original Grand Hall

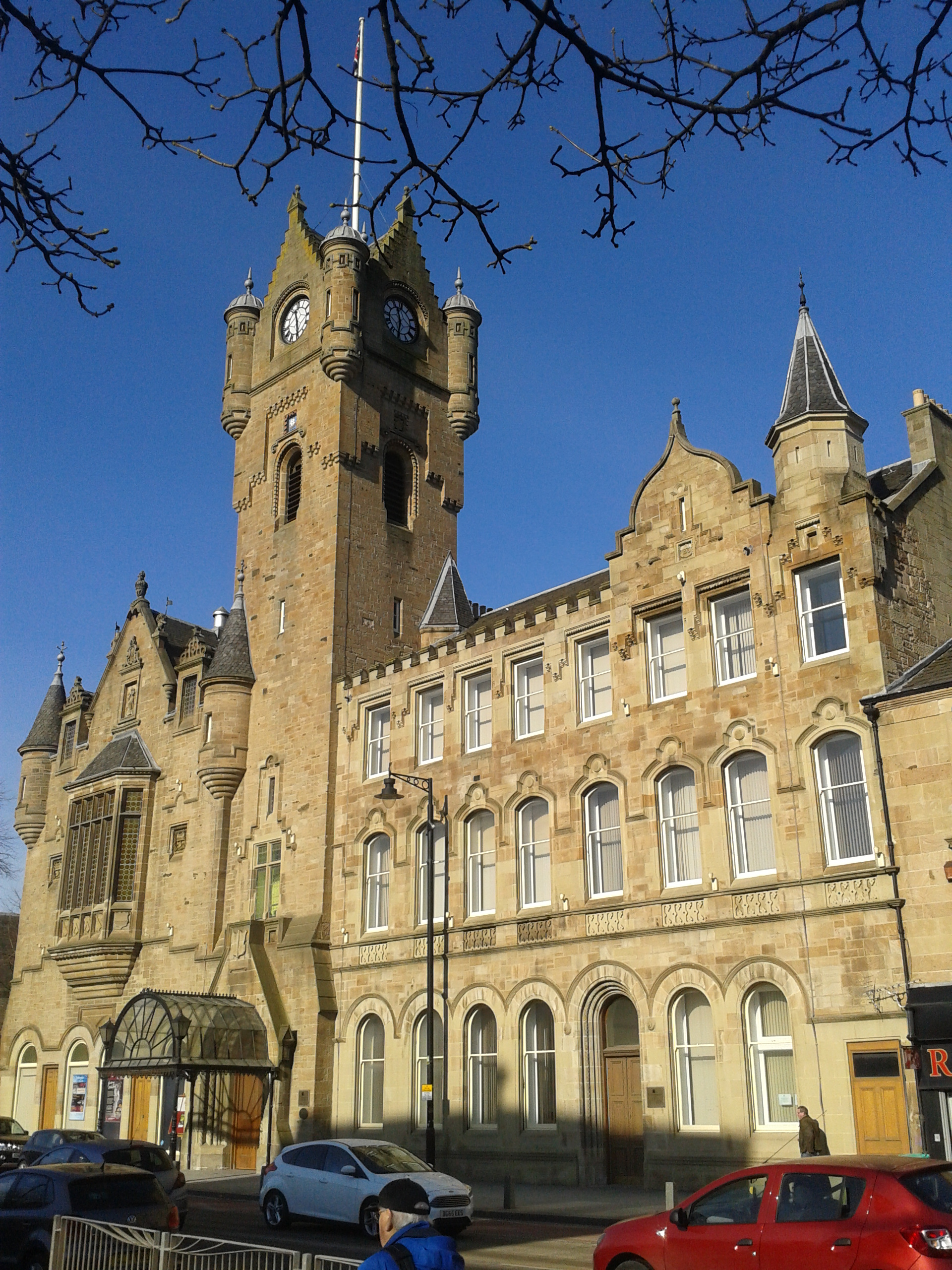
View from south showing 1877 east extension

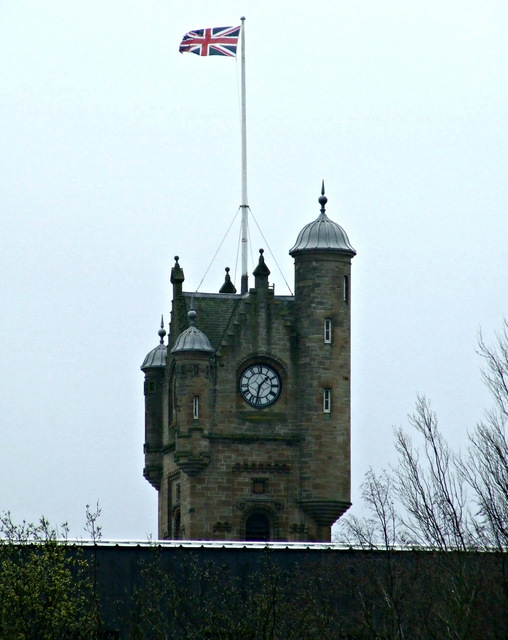
View of the clock tower

Rutherglen's other Category A listed buildings are located very near to the town hall: a medieval clock tower and churchyard is situated immediately to the west, while St Columbkille's RC Church (completed in 1940) is directly opposite on the other side of Main Street. There are also several Category B structures in close proximity (library, Old Parish Church, statue of Dr Gorman, tenement adjoining the town hall's east wing).

== See also ==
- List of Category A listed buildings in South Lanarkshire
- List of city and town halls in Scotland
- List of listed buildings in Rutherglen, South Lanarkshire
- List of theatres in Scotland
