= Lanark Hydro Electric Scheme =

Two power stations in South Lanarkshire, Scotland

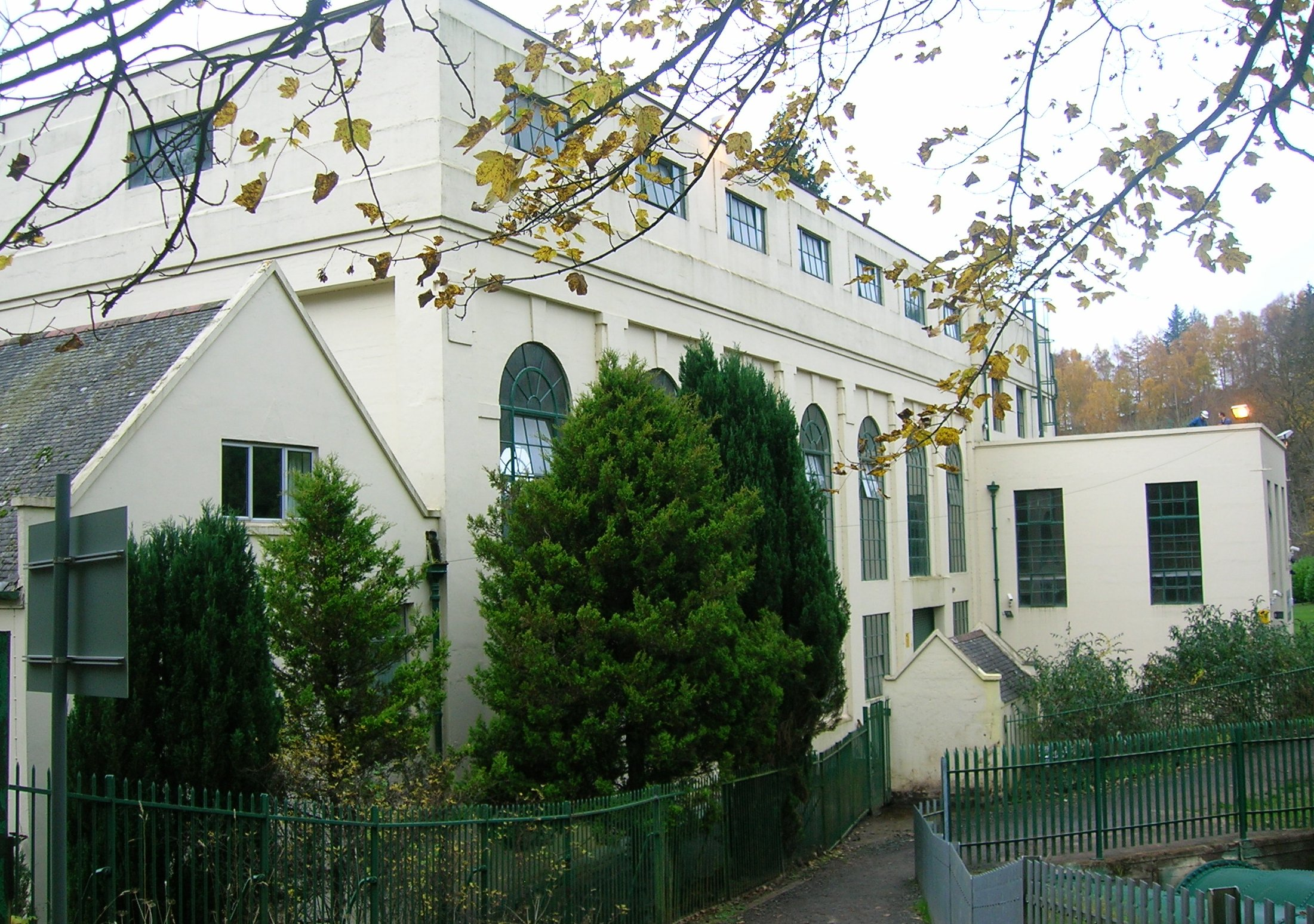
- Bonnington power station
- Location: South Lanarkshire, Scotland
- Coordinates: 55°39′16.85″N 3°46′17.37″W
- Status: Operational
- Construction began: 1926
- Opening date: 1926
- Owner(s): Drax Group

Power Station
- Installed capacity: 17 MW; Bonnington 11 MW; Stonebyres 6 MW

The Lanark Hydro Electric Scheme consists of two hydroelectric plants in the Clydesdale area of South Lanarkshire, Scotland. They are run-of-the-river power stations, using water from the River Clyde near to the Falls of Clyde. Bonnington Power Station gets its water supply from just above Corra Linn in New Lanark, while Stonebyres Power Station takes water from above Stonebyres Linn near Kirkfieldbank. Bonnington is the larger of the two stations, which between them can produce 17 MW.

The Lanark Hydro Electric Scheme was the first large-scale scheme in the United Kingdom to produce clean renewable energy for public supply, using water from the Falls of Clyde to power homes and meet the growing demand for electricity after World War I. The scheme does not use dams for water storage, relying instead on there being sufficient water in the river and flowing down the waterfalls to enable the power stations to operate for most of the year. The two stations generate enough electricity for power over 17,000 homes, and make a significant contribution to the target of producing 40 per cent of Scotland's energy from renewable sources by 2020.

== History ==
The idea of using the Falls of Clyde to generate electricity was first suggested in 1909 by Sir Charles Ross. The scheme did not proceed, because it would have generated more power than local markets would need. The Clyde Valley Electric Power Company built coal-fired power stations at Yoker, Clyde's Mill and Motherwell, which were sufficiently successful that they had become the largest producer and distributor of electricity in Scotland by the end of the First World War. As the system grew, it needed rationalising, and G T Goslin moved from the Glasgow Corporation Electricity Department to become the General Manager. He had previously worked with Edward MacColl from the Corporation's Tramway Department, and convinced him to become the technical engineer for the company. MacColl devoted his energy to designing equipment to control high voltage transmission systems, generators and transformers. This work was sufficiently successful that fuel costs for the existing stations were reduced considerably.

In the early 1920s, the Power and Traction Finance Company looked again at the possibility of hydro-electric power from the Falls of Clyde. This was a consortium, consisting of the civil engineers Sir William Arrol & Co., steelmakers John Brown, shipbuilders Cammell Laird, industrialists English Electric and Prudential Insurance. They tried to address the issues of how to store water in case there was a drought, and where to sell the electricity that would be generated. For the second problem, they contacted the Clyde Valley Company, who were the 'authorised undertakers' for the sale of electricity in the region. MacColl looked at issues of water rights, and ensuring that the beauty of the scenery would not be spoiled. He also investigated flows on the Clyde, and decided that a run-of-the-river scheme could be built, which would not need reservoirs to store the water. The catchment for the river was over 400 square miles (1,000 km^{2}) and he was convinced that there would be adequate flow throughout the year. The Clyde Valley company formed a subsidiary in 1924, the Lanarkshire Hydro-Electric Power Company, to manage the project.

When the plans were published, there were objections from the Gourock Rope Company, who operated the watermills at New Lanark at the time. They thought that their water supply would be compromised, as the watermills were located between the proposed sites of the two power stations, but this issue was resolved, and the Westminster parliament approved plans to construct Lanark Hydro Electric Scheme on the Clyde in 1924. Buchan & Partners were responsible for the design work, while Guy Maunsell, who was working for Sir William Arrol, was the site agent. Construction began in 1926, and the Bonnington and Stonebyres power stations, which were around 3 miles (4.8 km) apart, were completed by the end of that year. The power stations hold the distinction of being the first large-scale hydro-electric plants in the United Kingdom to be constructed to provide a public supply, rather than for industrial use. The Grampian scheme near Pitlochry was authorised two years earlier, in 1922, but construction did not start until 1928.

=== Construction ===
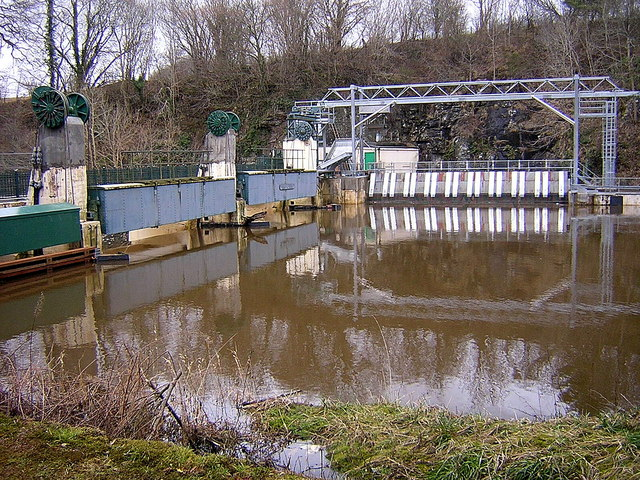
The sluice gates which control the water supply to Stonebyres power station

Because the Falls of Clyde were in an area of outstanding natural beauty, much thought was given to ensuring that the scheme fitted in well with its surroundings. This included appointing a panel of architectural advisors, including Sir John Stirling-Maxwell, the Earl of Home and the renowned Scottish architect Sir Robert Lorimer, to advise on the design. MacColl chose to use a run-of-the-river scheme, so that the nature of the river would not be changed by the construction of reservoirs, and he designed ingenious tilting weirs, that would control river levels to within 6 inches (15 cm) of the optimum required to maintain flow over the falls and supply water for the turbines. Each consisted of three gates with counterweights, which could only move downwards by their lower section hinging, to allow more water to reach the turbines, when the water level and pressure rose above the optimum. The mechanism had not previously been used anywhere, but proved to be successful. The original gates were manufactured by Ransomes & Rapier of Ipswich, but some new gates were added at Bonnington in the early 21st century.

Bonnington power station was the furthest upstream, and its tilting weir fed water into a pipeline which was 2,300 feet (700 m) long and 10 feet (3.0 m) in diameter. A circular concrete surge tank, which was finished in white render, and two tall concrete surge shafts were constructed behind Bonnington Pavilion. The tank was connected to the turbine house by twin steel pipes of 6.5 feet (2.0 m) diameter, which were painted green. Within the turbine house were two Francis turbines, supplied by English Electric, connected to generators which could each produce 4.92 Megawatts (MW) of power. The original turbines are still in place, but the generators have since been upgraded so that the station can now produce 11 MW. The turbine house is a rectangular two-storey building, finished in white render, with large round-topped arched windows, smaller rectangular windows, and a flat-topped roof. A similar but smaller wing houses the electrical switch gear, and there is a house for the attendant with a pitched roof.

Stonebyres power station is very similar in design. The main pipeline is 1,550 feet (470 m) long and 11 feet (3.4 m) in diameter. The circular surge tank is located behind the turbine house, with twin pipes feeding the two turbines, which were rated at 2.84 MW each. The buildings are similar to those at Bonnington, with simple classical detailing, and some of the original switchgear is preserved on a balcony within the switch room. The access doors on the north side of the building have since been blocked up, to allow a new transformer station to be constructed.

=== Operation ===
Much of the original systems remain, but there have been a number of upgrades made to the stations since their inception. Both Bonnington and Stonebyres were automated in 1970, and at the same time, the original synchronous generators were replaced by induction generators, still driven by the original turbines. In 1991/2, the oil-filled circuit breakers in the switchrooms were replaced by new gas-operated breakers, while in 1994/5 three stators were replaced. The turbine runners were replaced by new stainless steel parts in the late 1990s, resulting in a ten per cent improvement in efficiency, and the maximum output increasing by 14 per cent. At the same time, the control systems were updated, to allow Bonnington station to be controlled remotely from Stonebyres. Following the publication of the Renewables Obligation (Scotland) in 2002, both stations were refurbished over the next two years to enable them to be certified under that legislation. The turbine runners and guide vanes were replaced as part of the upgrade. Both stations have been fitted with oil interceptor systems, to ensure that if an oil spill were to occur, it would be trapped before it could pollute the river.

The twin steel pipes at Bonnington, which are 750 feet (230 m) long, were grit blasted and repainted in 2006/7, while those at Stonebyres, which are only 69 feet (21 m) long, were replaced with new pipes. In the late 2010s, the deck of the bridge over Bonnington weir was replaced, while at Stonebyres, the weir gates were replaced. These are 38 by 9 feet (11.6 by 2.7 m) and each one weighs around six tonnes. Since the upgrades, Bonnington can produce 11 MW and Stonebyres 6 MW. The electricity is generated at 11 kilovolts (kV), and is transmitted to a remote substation, where it is stepped up to 132 kV so that it can be distributed by the National Grid.

The electricity industry was nationalised after the passing of the Electricity Act 1947, but whereas in the north, the North of Scotland Hydro-Electric Board was responsible for both generation and distribution of power, in the south there were four bodies responsible for the same functions. This was resolved by the Electricity Reorganisation (Scotland) Act 1954 which gave the South of Scotland Electricity Board a similar remit to the northern board, and management of the Lanark scheme became their responsibiiity. The scheme remained a public asset for several decades, until the privatisation of the energy industry. From 1990 it was owned by Scottish Power, but in 2018 Drax Group plc acquired the Lanark Hydro Electric Scheme when it purchased Scottish Power's hydro and pumped storage assets from Iberdrola.

== Assessment ==
The power stations are located in an area of outstanding natural beauty, where the River Clyde passes through a steep-sided valley, surrounded by woodland, and containing three large waterfalls. The landscape has been a tourist attraction since the early 1700s, when Bonnington Pavilion, which was once known as the Hall of Mirrors was constructed, overlooking the Corra Linn waterfall. By the 1830s, it had become part of a network of riverside walks, cut through the woodland, to enable visitors to appreciate the grandeur of the river. A cast-iron footbridge linked the right bank of the Clyde to an island, enabling visitors to view the Bonnington Linn waterfall more easily. It was manufactured by Paterson of Carmichael in 1829.

The cotton-spinning village of New Lanark was constructed on the right bank between the waterfalls from 1786. By the late 19th century, a turbine had been installed to generate electricity, and the original water wheels were removed in the 1930s.

Against this backdrop, Edward MaccColl, (later Sir Edward), set about creating power stations that would not spoil the natural beauty of the area, and maintain the flow over the waterfalls, so that they could still be enjoyed by tourists. The scheme was branded "MacColl's Folly" by those who thought that burning coal was the only way to produce electricity, but his pioneering designs for this run-of-the river scheme led to him becoming one of the foremost engineers for hydro-electric schemes of the 20th century. His use of an advisory committee to oversee the designs, high quality architecture and innovative engineering of a high standard were all carried forwards to his work for the North of Scotland Hydro-Electric Board from 1943 onwards. Lanark was the first of three pre-war public supply schemes, and the Galloway and Grampian schemes followed suit in their use of good architecture and engineering. All of MacColl's structures at Lanark have since been listed as Grade A structures, including the turbine house buildings, the surge towers, weirs, tanks and even the pipelines, because they are outstanding examples of early hydro-electric power stations.

Since 2001, the core of New Lanark, covering 360 acres (146 ha), has been a designated World Heritage Site. Although neither of the power stations are in this area, there is a larger buffer zone around the site, and Bonnington station is within the buffer zone.

== Ecology ==
The Falls of Clyde National Nature Reserve is located along the banks of the Clyde at New Lanark, and consists of 150 acres (59 ha) of habitat which in 2011 was jointly managed by the Scottish Wildlife Trust, Scottish Power and the Corehouse Estate. The reserve is visited by around 60,000 people each year, and Scottish Power sponsor a ranger who interacts with visitors and carries out wildlife surveys. They have also contributed to a study to find out how access to Bonnington Pavilion and Bonnington Linn footbridge can be improved. Every year, the turbines are shut down for a few weeks, to allow maintenance to be carried out, and to allow visitors to see the falls with larger volumes of water flowing down them.

Scottish Power also worked closely with the Scottish Environment Protection Agency and local communities. They produced their first biodiversity action plan in 2005, which detailed how they aimed to protect the wildlife and plant life at the Hydro Electric scheme. A second plan was produced in 2009, which included timescales for implementing their objectives. The habitats around the power stations are known to support over 1,900 species, many of which are listed in the UK Biodiversity Action Plan as needing support from conservation initiatives. Among the one hundred species of birds that have been observed, 15 are listed in the Biodiversity action plan. Species found within the reserve include red squirrels and otters, while species listed in the Biodiversity action plan include brown hares, polecats, soprano pipistrelle bats, water voles, adders, slow worms and common lizards. Around 700 species of plants have been recorded, including the lesser butterfly-orchid. Species which are not native to the area, including sycamore and rhododendrons, are being removed while some coppicing of the trees is carried out, to encourage the growth of vegetation at ground level. The Wildlife Trust has installed some 120 bird and bat boxes, which have been partially funded by the hydro-electric scheme. Peregrine falcons returned to the gorge in 1997, and visitors can watch live video footage of them in the visitor centre.

== Bibliography ==
- Fleetwood, David (2010). Power to the people (PDF). Historic Scotland. ISBN 978-1-84917-036-9. Archived from the original (PDF) on 4 March 2016.
- Payne, Peter L (1988). The Hydro. Aberdeen University Press. ISBN 978-0-08-036584-8.
