= Corehouse =

Country house and estate in Scotland

Coordinates: 55.6549°N 3.7778°W

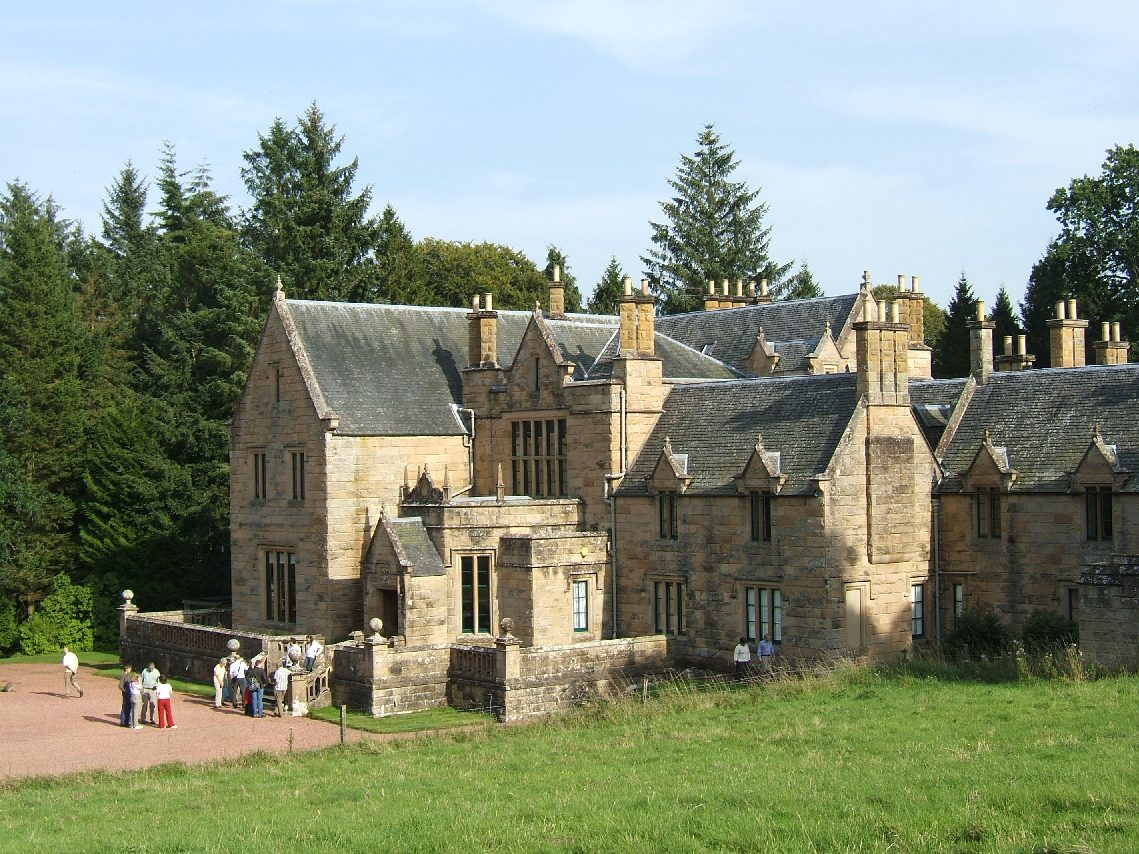
The entrance front of Corehouse

Corehouse is a country house and estate, located 2 kilometres (1.2 mi) to the south of Lanark, Scotland. The estate is by the Corra Linn Falls on the River Clyde, and close to the World Heritage Site of New Lanark. The house was designed by Sir Edward Blore for George Cranstoun, Lord Corehouse, and was completed in 1827.

== History ==
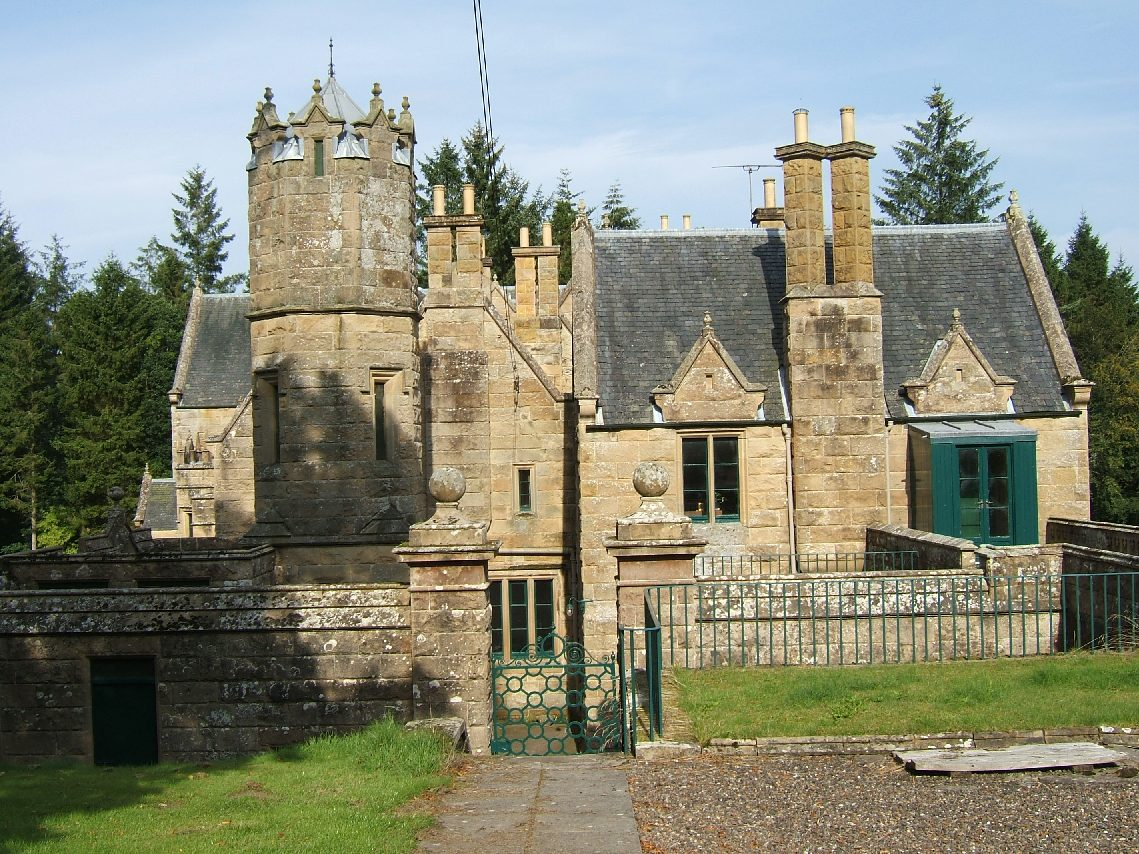
West facade of the house

The Corehouse estate was owned in 1799 by the Misses Edmonson, and a Georgian house stood on the site. By 1824 the estate was in the possession of the advocate George Cranstoun, a grandson of the 5th Lord Cranstoun. On the recommendation of his friend Sir Walter Scott, Cranstoun commissioned the architect Edward Blore to design a new house, which was completed in 1827. Cranstoun later took the title Lord Corehouse when he was appointed to the College of Justice. Blore's design, executed in an "Elizabethan Cotswold manor house style" was influential on the development of country house architecture in England and Scotland, including the work of William Burn.

Corehouse is a category A listed building, and its grounds form part of the Falls of Clyde site which is listed in the Inventory of Gardens and Designed Landscapes in Scotland. Part of the estate was given to the Scottish Wildlife Trust, to form the Corehouse Nature Reserve.

== Corra Castle ==
The remains of Corra Castle, a 15th-century fortified farmhouse built by the Bannatyne family, stand close to Corehouse and by the Corra Linn Falls, defended by cliffs on three sides. The ruins comprise the remains of a tower with basement cellars, and a small courtyard to its east.

== See also ==
- Bonnington Pavilion
