= Corra Castle =

Ruined 16th-century castle in Scotland

- New Lanark, South Lanarkshire in Scotland
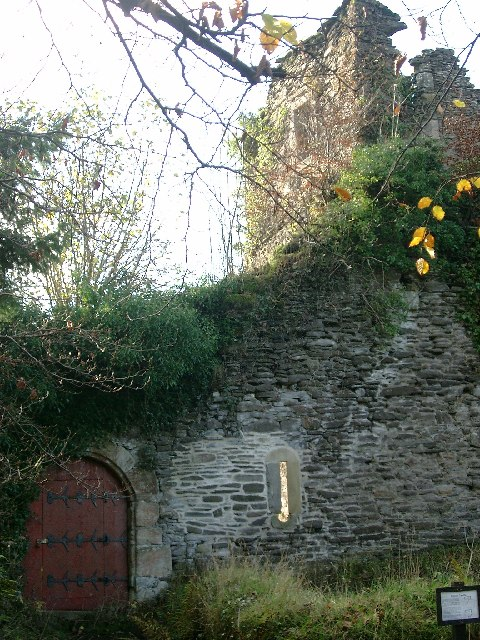
- Present day ruins of the castle

Site information
- Owner: Scottish Wildlife Trust
- Condition: Ruined

Location
- Location within South Lanarkshire
- Coordinates: 55.653394°N 3.777935°W

Site history
- Built: 1572
- Materials: Rubble masonry

Corra Castle (also known as Corrax, Corax or Corehouse Castle) is a ruined 16th-century castle within the Corehouse Estate near New Lanark, Scotland. It overlooks Corra Linn, one of the four waterfalls which make up the Falls of Clyde. In 1967 it became a scheduled monument.

The site was chosen because it was seen as being impregnable, as it is surrounded by sharp cliffs on three sides. It features a ha-ha as part of its design, offering an unobstructed view of the surrounding countryside.

Corra Castle was at one time the residence to one of the branches of the notable family of Somerville. In his 1832 book, The Edinburgh Encyclopædia, David Brewster wrote:

...and directly above the upper fall, stands the ruinous castle of Corra, formerly the residence of a family of the name of Somerville...

== See also ==
- Corehouse
- Bonnington Pavilion
- Corra Castle, Kirkgunzeon County Dumfries and Galloway
