= Clyde Walkway =

Foot and bike path in Scotland

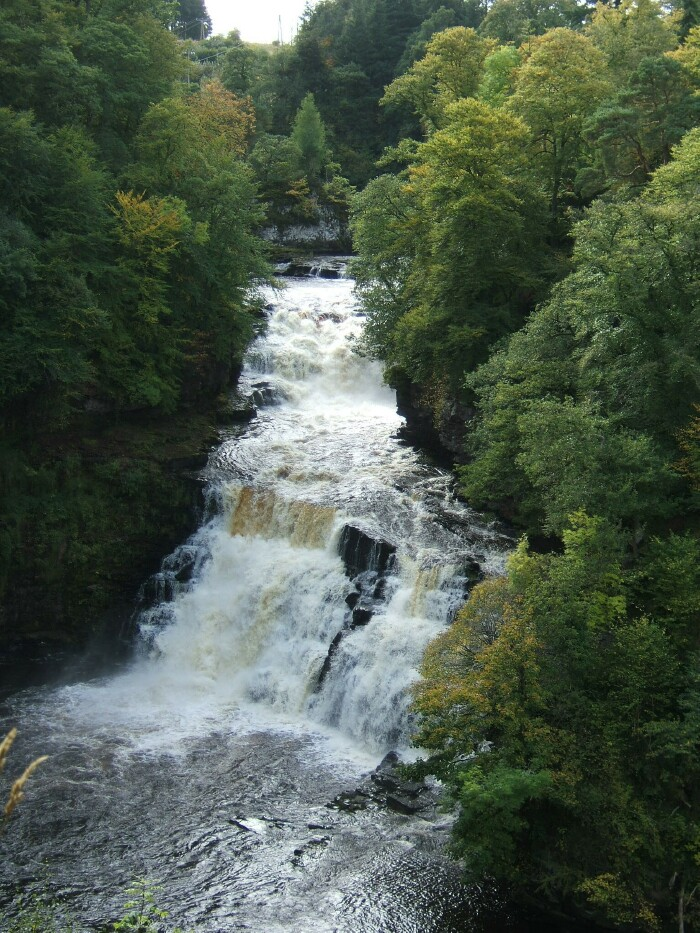
- Corra Linn above New Lanark
- Length: 65 km (40 mi)
- Location: Central Scotland
- Established: 2005
- Designation: Scotland's Great Trails
- Trailheads: Partick station, Glasgow 55.870°N 4.309°W; Bonnington Linn, New Lanark 55.647°N 3.77°W
- Use: Hiking
- Elevation gain/loss: 720 metres (2,360 ft) gain
- Sights: River Clyde

The Clyde Walkway is a foot and mountain bike path which runs from Glasgow, Scotland, to just above the UNESCO World Heritage Site of New Lanark. The path runs close to the River Clyde for most of its length. It was completed in 2005, and is now designated as one of Scotland's Great Trails by NatureScot. The route is 65 kilometres (40 mi) long, and combines rural sections on the upper Clyde in South Lanarkshire, including the Clyde Valley Woodlands National Nature Reserve and the Falls of Clyde, with urban walking through the centre of Glasgow. About 155,000 people use the path every year, of whom about 7,750 undertake multi-day journeys including those covering the entire route.

== Route of the path ==
=== Glasgow to Cambuslang Bridge ===
This section, which is 15 kilometres (9.3 mi) long, starts at Partick station (which is on a railway line from Glasgow Central station) and proceeds on the north bank of the River Clyde to Cambuslang Bridge. The bridge is a short distance from Cambuslang railway station. The path passes by a number of other long distance paths, including the Glasgow to Inverness National Cycle Route, the Kelvin Walkway and paths to Edinburgh, Irvine and Greenock. The path passes a number of sites of interest.

=== Cambuslang Bridge to Strathclyde Country Park ===
For most of this section the path stays close to the River Clyde. It passes Bothwell Castle, the ruins of Blantyre Priory (opposite bank via a detour), the David Livingstone Centre, the remains of Craighead Viaduct, Raith Haugh Nature Reserve and Bothwell Bridge Lido. Parts of the path also pass extensive remains of past mining spoil, and the wooded confluence of the Rotten Calder Water. After crossing Bothwell Road at the Lido the path formerly returned to the riverside, but has since been rerouted following an upgrade to the Raith Interchange. The walkway here now shares the cycle paths over the interchange and under the M74 in order to connect with Strathclyde Park. Care is needed due to the convoluted routes in this section, and their variety, which often leads to path users becoming lost. This section of the path ends at the Watersports Centre in Strathclyde Country Park. The nearest railway station is approximately 1 mile (1.6 km) away at Motherwell on both the West Coast Main Line and Argyle Line. This section is 14 kilometres (8.7 mi) in length.

=== Strathclyde Country Park to Cardies Bridge ===
This section, which is 14 kilometres (8.7 mi) long, mostly follows the north bank of the River Clyde through low-lying urban fringe countryside, some of it wooded. It passes the Avon Walkway which can be followed to Chatelherault Country Park. The section ends at Cardies Bride which is 5.1 kilometres (3.2 mi) from the closest train station at Wishaw.

This section passes through or by a number of sites of interest, including: Baron's Haugh nature reserve, Dalzell House and Park with Roman Fort site, St. medieval Patrick's Kirkyard, the medieval St. Michael's kirkyard (old Cambusnethan Kirk), the ruins of Cambusnethan Priory, various disused Clyde Valley orchards, Garrion Bridge, and finally Garrion Tower. At Cardies Bridge it enters the Mauldslie Woods.

=== Cardies Bridge to Crossford ===
This 10 km (6.2 mi) section runs through attractive areas of riverine countryside, orchards and meadows, much of it wooded. This part of the Clyde Valley was once famous for the produce of its orchards and greenhouses. Many remain, though few of the orchards are still in commercial production. The path passes the well preserved Milton Lockhart gatebridge over the Clyde; a memorial to Board of Ordnance pioneer William Roy; and the 16th century Craignethan Castle, which sits on a rocky outcrop above the Nethan Water, an important tributary of the Clyde. This section ends at the village of Crossford. There are bus services to Lanark, and to Hamilton. The nearest railway station is approximately 5.6 kilometres (3.5 mi) away, uphill at Carluke.

=== Crossford to New Lanark ===
This section, which is 11 kilometres (6.8 mi) long, is commonly regarded as the most attractive section of the walkway. The path proceeds through furth riverine countryside dotted with areas of settlement along the banks of the River Clyde. It first passes Stonybyres Hydroelectric Station. This came into operation in 1927. The Stonebyres Linn here - one of the four 'Falls of Clyde' - are 21 m (69 ft) high. This marks the upper limit on the Clyde for migrating salmon and sea trout, as they cannot overcome the height of the cascade. After passing Lanark town (Royal Burgh granted 1180) the path enters the UNESCO World Heritage Site of New Lanark. The village and mills here were mostly built in the late 18th century to harness the power of the River Clyde in order to process cotton using mechanised means. The site is now a restored museum, hotel and events venue as well as residential accommodation in the wider village. Beyond the village the path enters the Falls of Clyde Nature Reserve beside the second Falls of Clyde - Dundaff Linn. Here the route passes the Bonnington Hydroelectric Station, and the remaining two Falls of Clyde. The most spectacular of these is the 28 m (92 ft) high Corra Linn.

This 'upper' Falls of Clyde section of the walkway incorporates the designed landscape of Bonnington, and connects with a wider path network through other estates, such as Corehouse. The area is concentrated in archaeological features, including formal viewpoints, disused bridges, Lady Mary's Well, Lady Mary's Steps, Wallaces Cave, Wallaces Leap, and the Bonnington Pavilion or 'Hall of Mirrors' constructed in 1708.

The path ends in open countryside at the topmost of the falls - Bonnington Linn - where there is a dam and sluice diverts water to the power station downhill. Lanark railway station is approximately 1.5 miles (2.4 km) from New Lanark. The station is one of the termini of the Argyle Line.
