= Bothwell Bridge Lido =

Swimming pool in South Lanarkshire, Scotland

Coordinates: 55.795199°N 4.057598°W

Bothwell Bridge Lido was a lido on the south-west side of Bothwell Bridge in Hamilton, South Lanarkshire, Scotland. The lido was opened in the 1930s and was in use until the early 1980s, when much of the area was built over by the A725 road, known locally as the East Kilbride Expressway.

The lido is unique with the water being the River Clyde. It also had Victorian-style gardens named "Lido Gardens". This is easiest to see from the Clyde Walkway and NCR 74 which run parallel to the A725, but have stairs down to the gardens. Remains of the sandy beach are still visible as of 2020.

== See also ==
- History of lidos in the United Kingdom
