= Bonnington Pavilion =

Coordinates: 55°39′14.6″N 3°46′28.6″W

The Bonnington Pavilion or Hall of Mirrors, now a ruin, is situated in the grounds of the old estate of Bonnington, near New Lanark, overlooking Corra Linn falls on the River Clyde in Lanarkshire, Scotland. Alternative names are the Corra Linn Pavilion and the Falls of Clyde summerhouse. It is said to have been the first Camera obscura built in Scotland. The name comes from the Gaelic 'currach', a marshy place. A legend gives 'Cora' as a daughter of King Malcolm II, who leapt to her death here whilst trying to escape imagined danger.

Location of the Bonnington Pavilion, Falls of Clyde

== The history of the pavilion ==
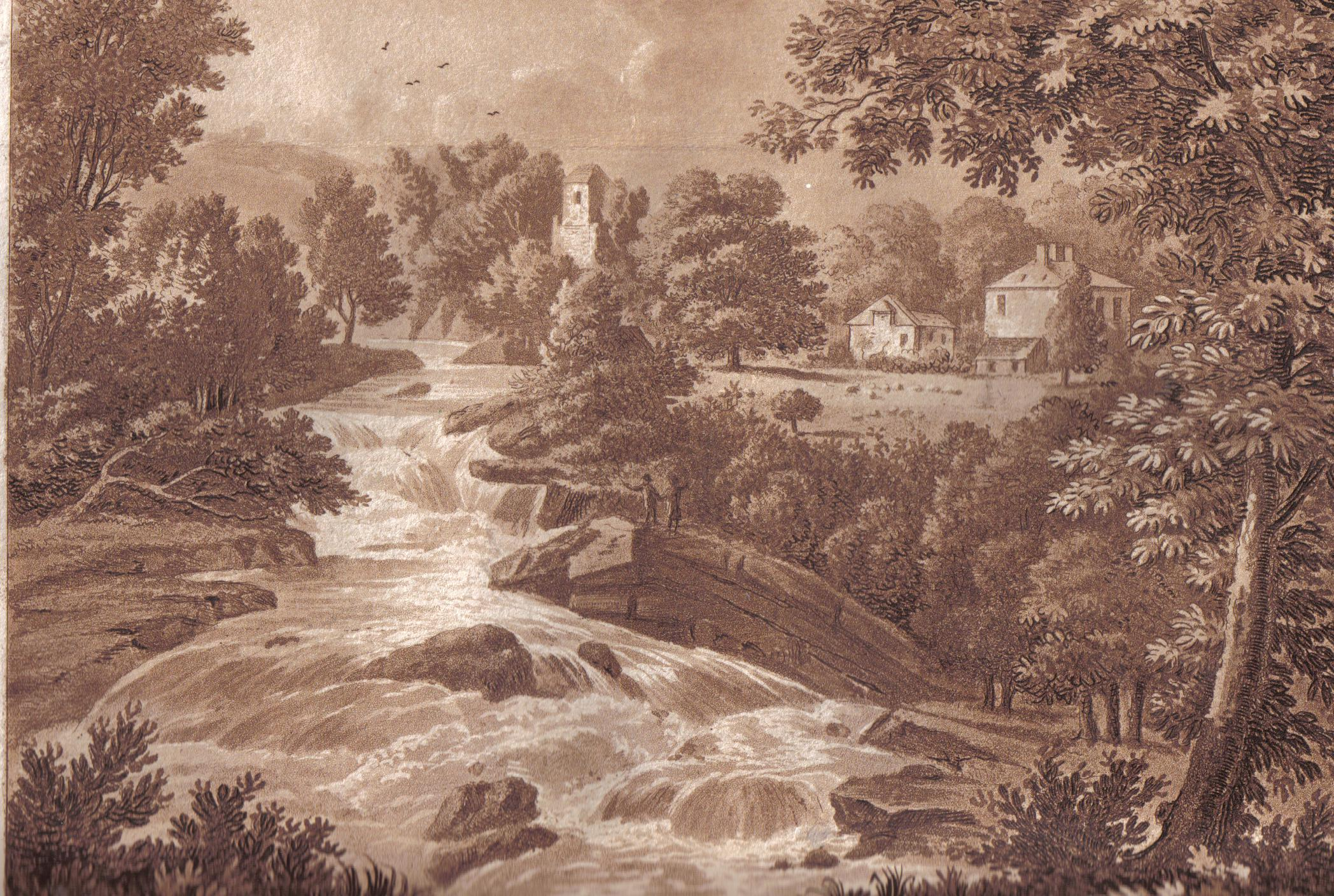
Corra Linn in 1799 – 1800.

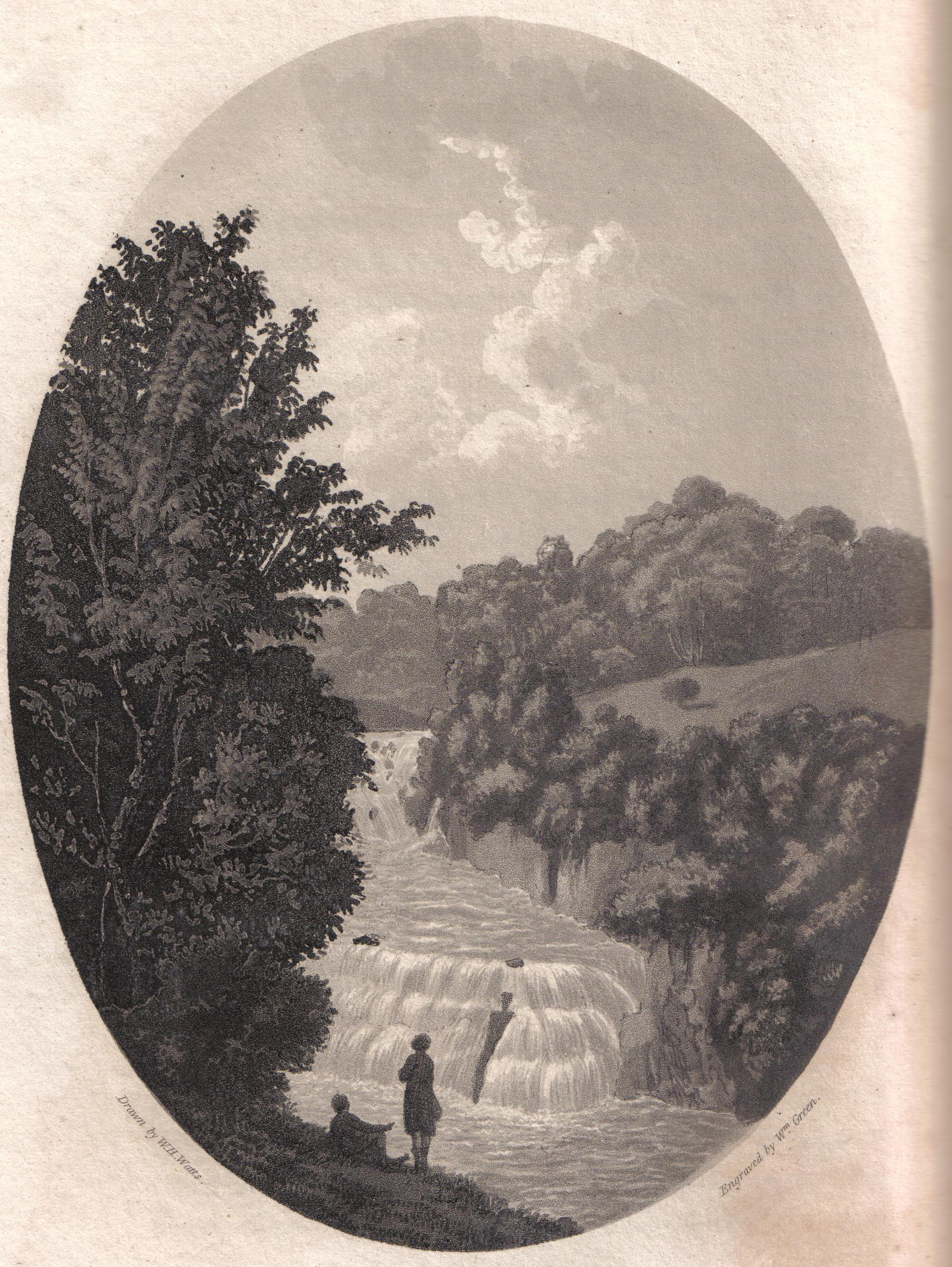
Corra Linn in 1800.

The building is dated 1708 over the entrance and was constructed by Sir James Carmichael of Bonnington House for the entertainment of his friends and guests. The building had mirrors installed which gave a view of the Falls of Clyde. A view of Corra Linn in 1799 – 1800 taken from Stoddarts Remarks on Scottish scenery gives some idea of the view that visitors would have seen in the 18th-century.

At the time of the construction of the pavilion it was generally felt amongst the aristocracy that nature was cruel and ugly and that women of good breeding should not look upon it unless it was reflected in a mirror or seen through a frame, thereby detaching the view from the aspect of harsh reality and transferring it to that of good taste and high art.

The building was still in use in the early 19th century, although Stoddart refers to it as a summerhouse. Garnett on his 1800 tour refers to the building as a 'pavilion' and mentions the mirrors, saying that .. as at Dunkeld, mirrors are placed, by the reflection of which we had different views of the water. He also comments on the fine view of the cotton mills that was to be had from the west window. It is not clear when it was abandoned, and the structure is now included on the Buildings at Risk Register for Scotland.

== Design details of the pavilion ==
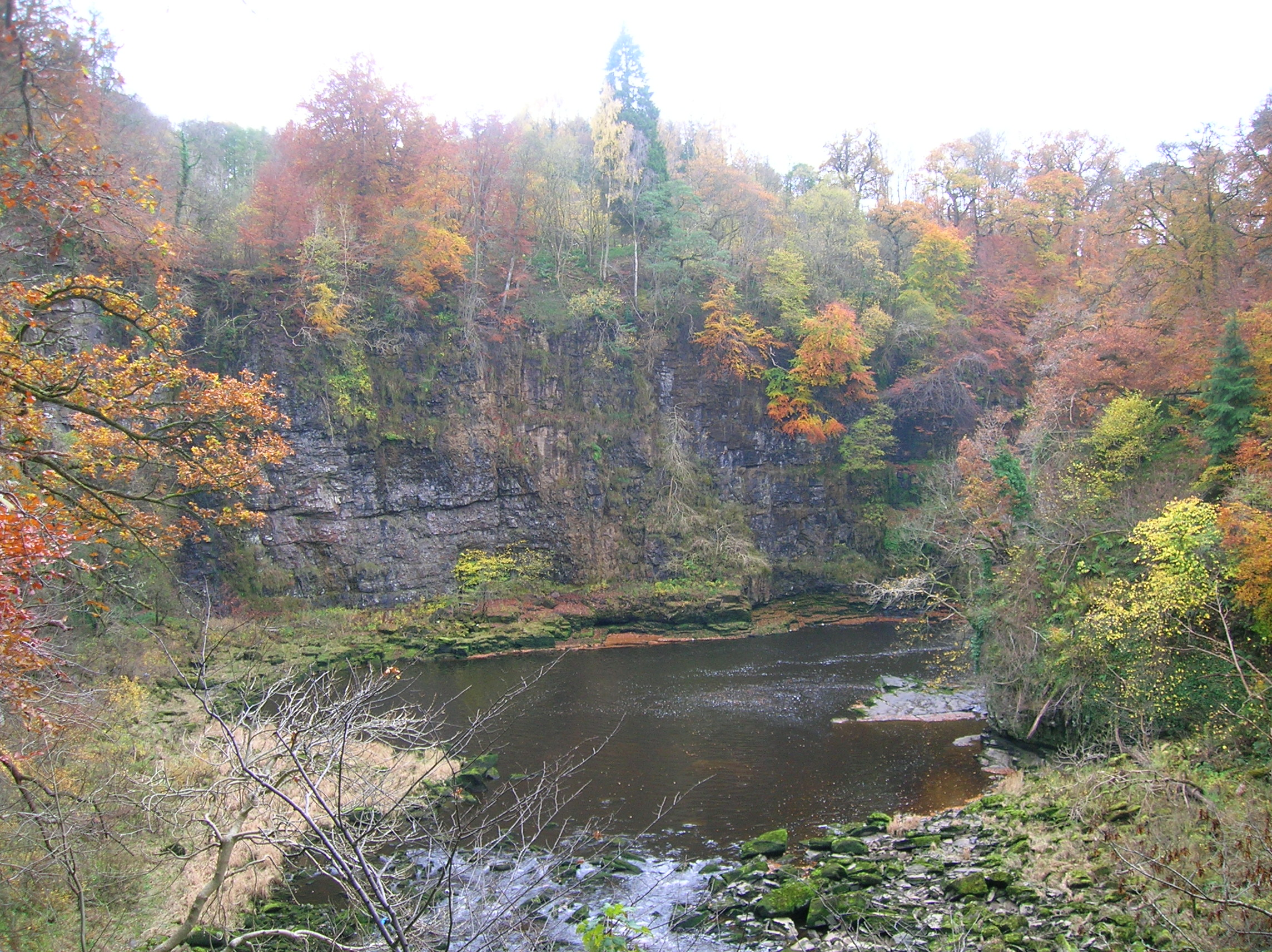
The natural amphitheatre below Corra Linn.

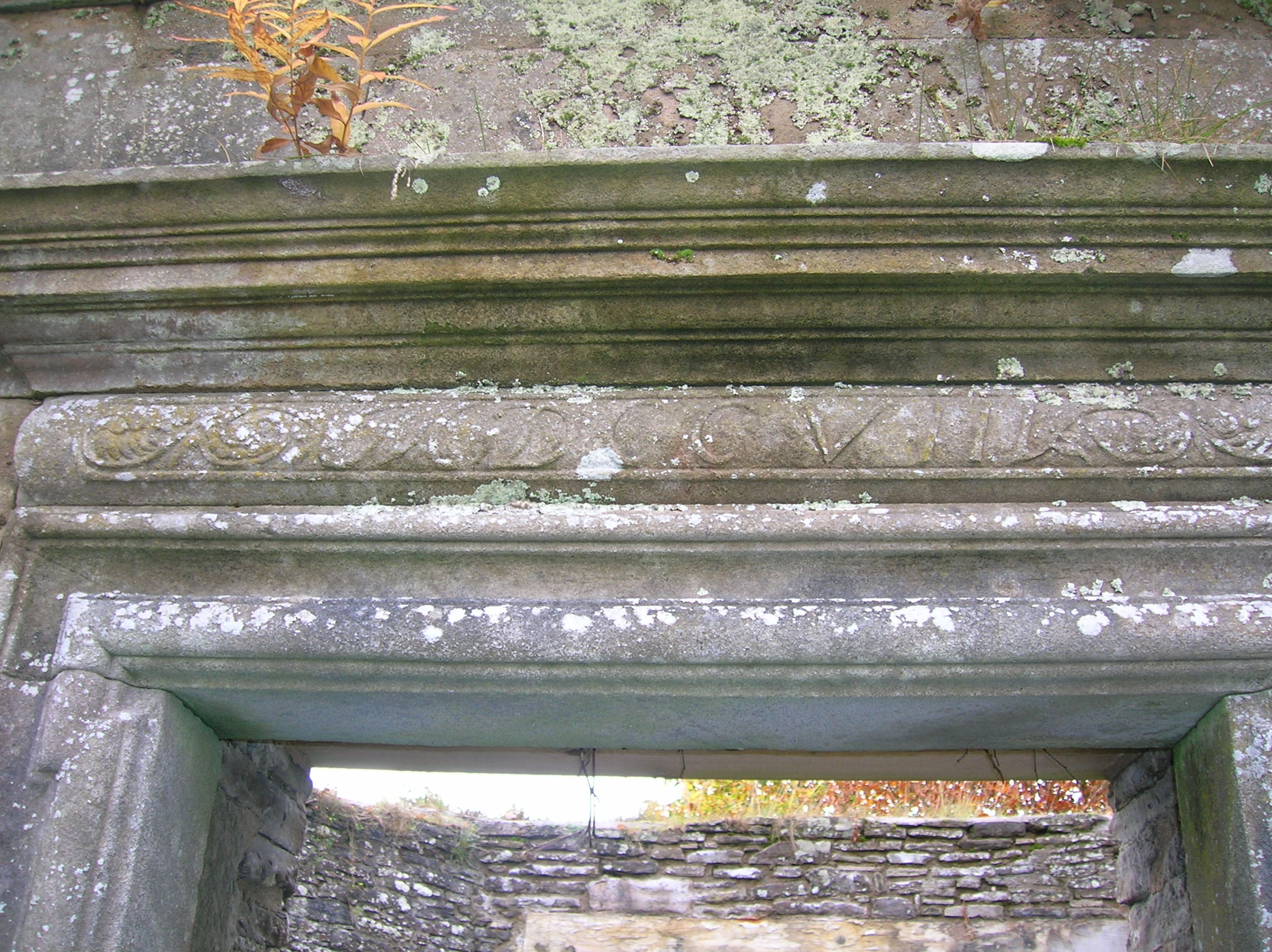
The door and 1708 date stone.

The pavilion had 2 floors, and the bottom floor may have been used at one stage as a kitchen for the preparation of refreshments for the ladies and gentlemen who came down from Bonnington House to view the falls.

Although a relatively large window, probably originally having shutters either side, looks onto the falls only a small hole is required for a camera obscura to function as this feature may be a later addition. The entrance door has a window set on each side, which would have prevented the projection of an image onto mirrors placed onto this 'back' wall. A window and ground floor door were present in each of the two side walls of the building; providing up to three doors altogether into the ground floor and a total of five windows, providing for exceptionally good views out of the building. The only apparently uninterrupted surface was the upper ceiling. The artist Alexander Archer sketched the pavilion from the south-west in 1837, probably including some 'artistic licence' . This sketch shows a different arrangement of the steps leading up to the door and a stone gable end, with highly ornate 'crow step' ornamentation, which would have given the building a typical arched sloping roof rather than a flat one as suggested by the remains today (2007). It may well be that the changes to the entrance steps took place when the hydroelectric power station was constructed in 1926 as the pipes carrying the water to the turbine house run very close to the pavilion entrance and they had to be moved to run parallel to the front of the building.

The building shows signs of other alterations, such as the closing up of one of the lower ground front 'servants' entrance to the suggested kitchen area and the provision of a balustrade at the viewing window, suggesting that at a later date the method of use of the building changed. Some modern repairs have been carried out to stabilise the building as indicated by recent pointing work, new wood lintels, etc.

=== The purpose of the mirrors ===
The pavilion had mirrors which reflected the falls, giving visitors, who sat with their backs to the window, the illusion, once the shutters or 'doors' were thrown open, that they were standing in the middle of the waterfalls. According to another report, the Pavilion had mirrors on its back wall. When the doors were opened visitors supposedly had the illusion of standing beneath the falls.

Swan records that "A beautiful though more distant view of this extraordinary scene, may be had from the window of a pavilion, erected by Sir James Carmichael of Bonniton, placed far above, on the very summit of the sloping bank which rises from the perpendicular rocks, can contemplate the whole freed from those feelings of terror with which in nearer situations, he cannot fail to be visited. Indeed, the scene has here more of the effect of a picture, or a beautiful panoramic view; the trees through which it is seen adding their interest to the foreground, or forming as it were a framework at the sides. At the opposite end of the pavilion, a Mirror is placed, in which this rich landscape is reflected; and from its position, the spectator is almost led to believe that the cataract is tumbling upon his head. Unfortunately, however, the illusion is not made so perfect as it might obviously be. The Mirror is neither of sufficient size, of a proper shape, or sufficiently concealed in the wall. Were a little expense laid out on the pavilion, which appears to be exactly as it was left by Sir John, a hundred and twenty years ago, the illusion might be exceedingly striking."

=== Views of the Bonnington Pavilion ===
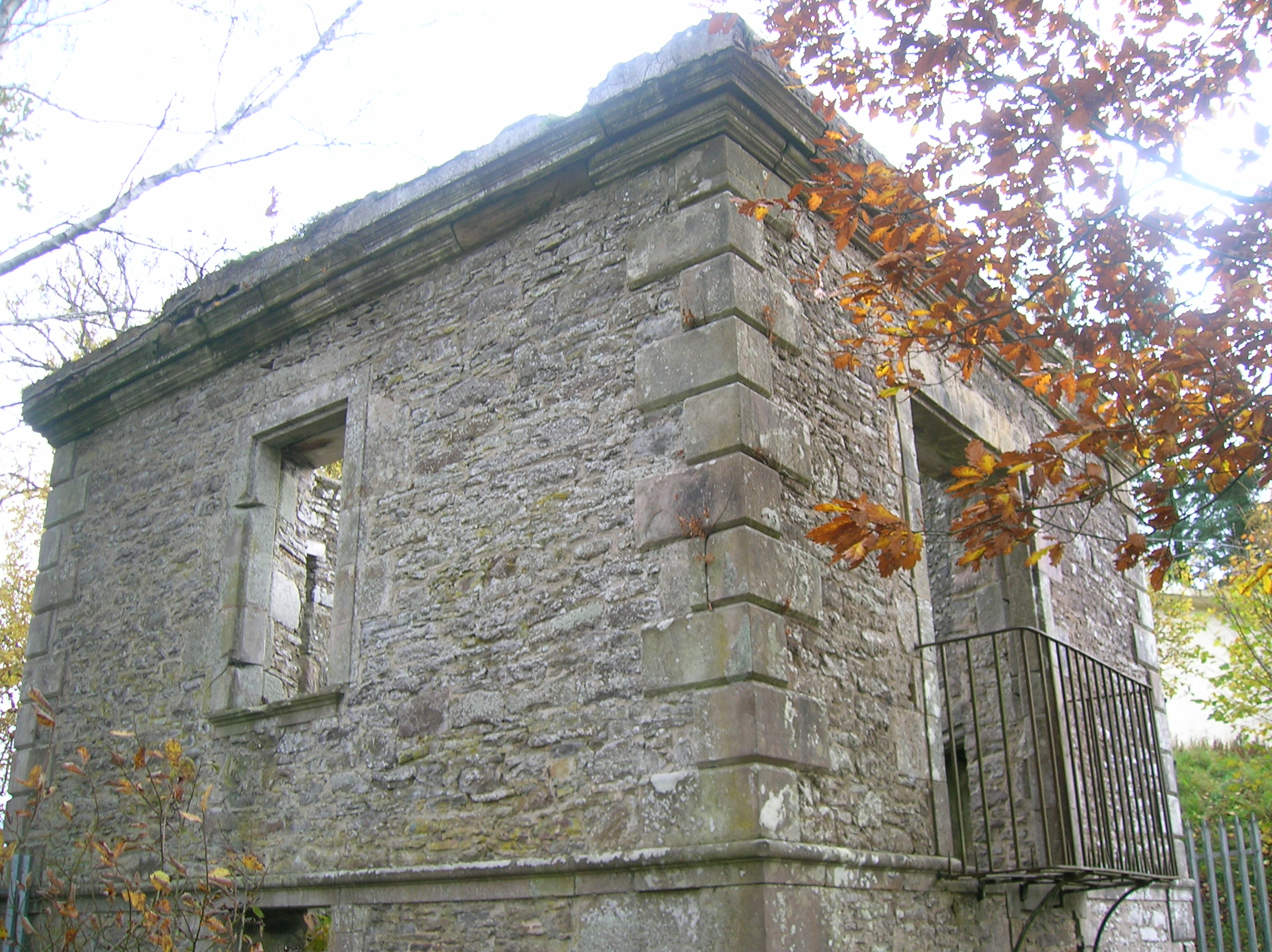
The 'New Lanark facing side' of the pavilion.

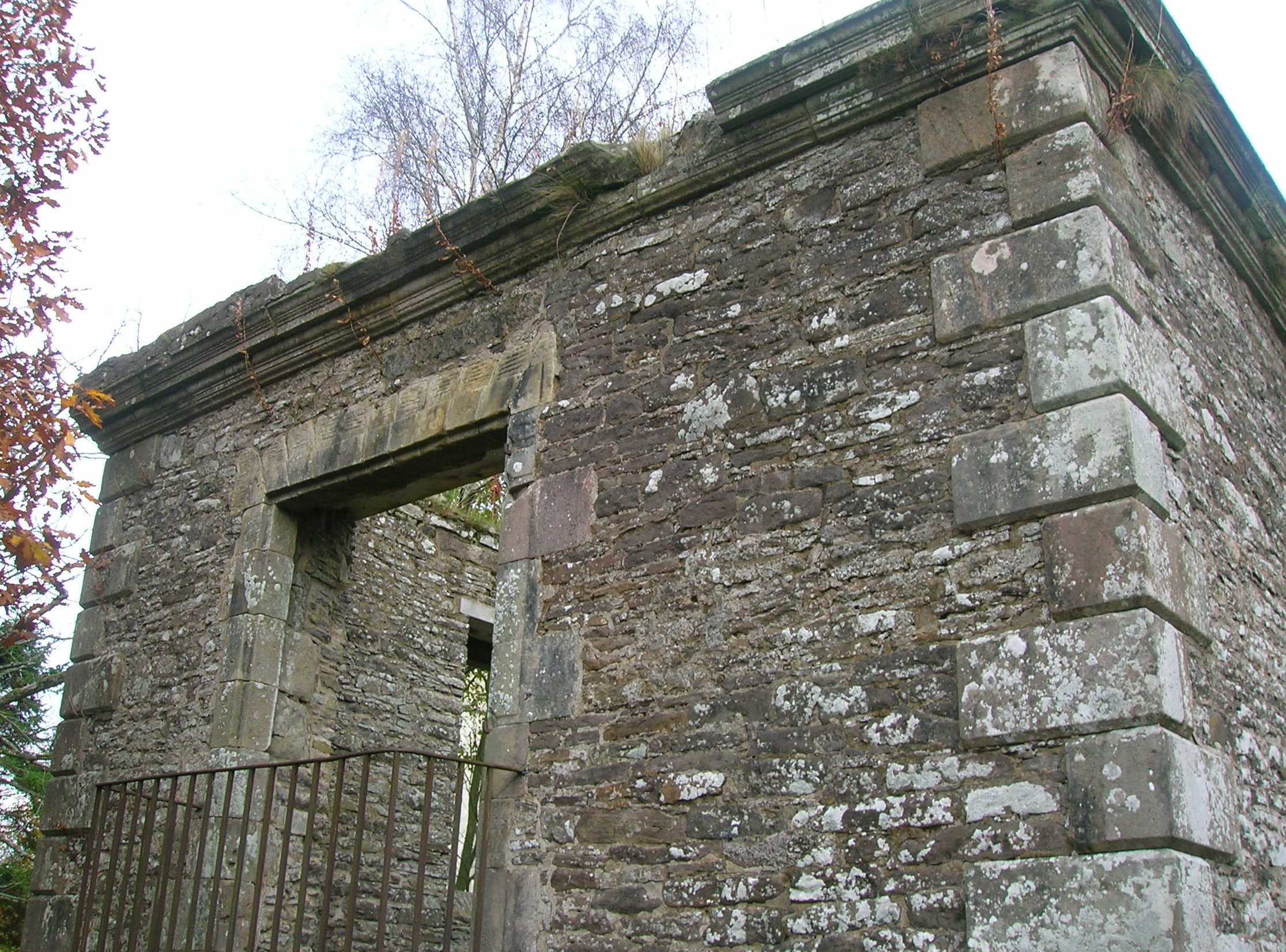
The viewing window from the outside showing the later iron balustrade.

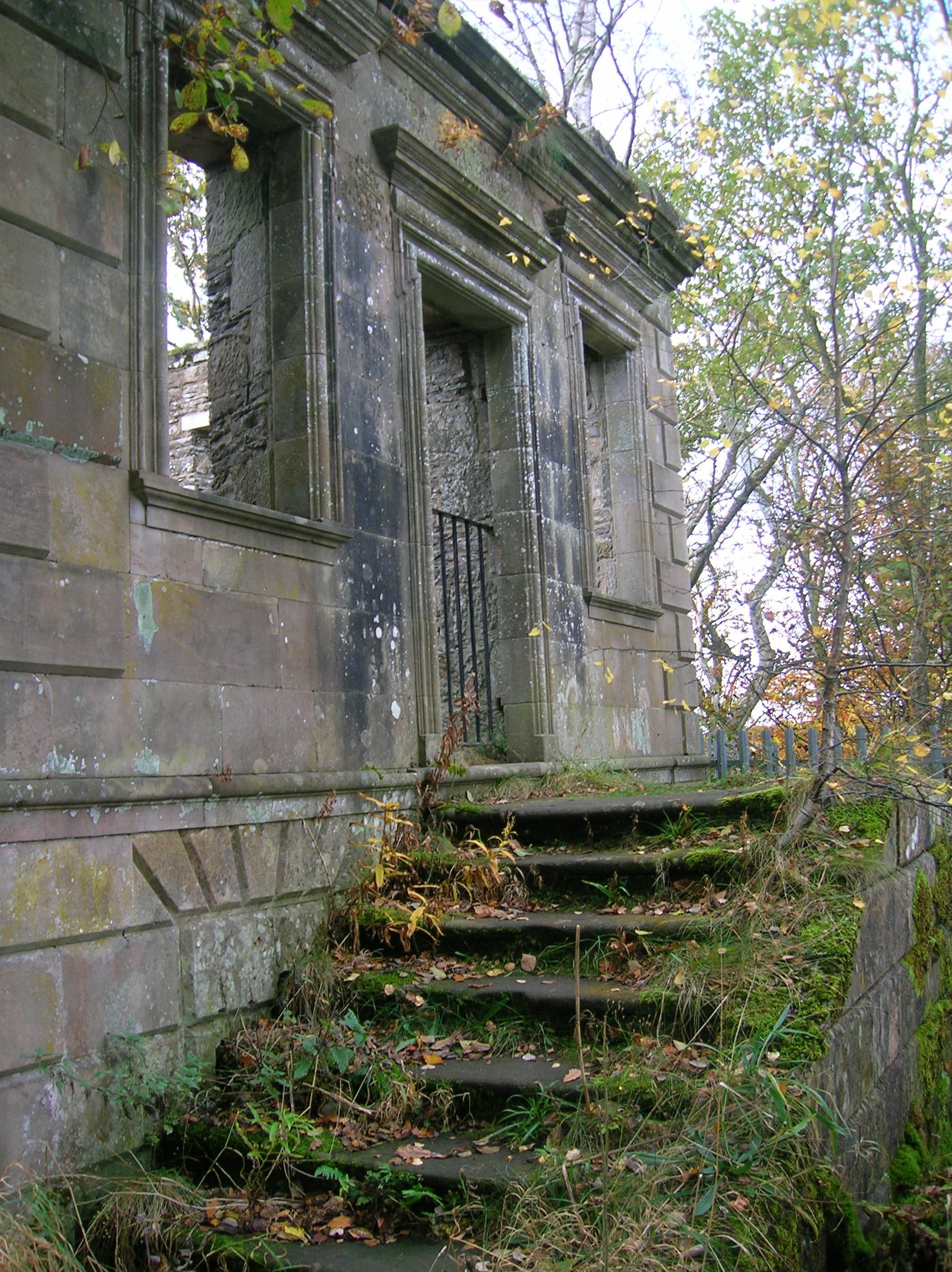
The altered steps up to the entrance.

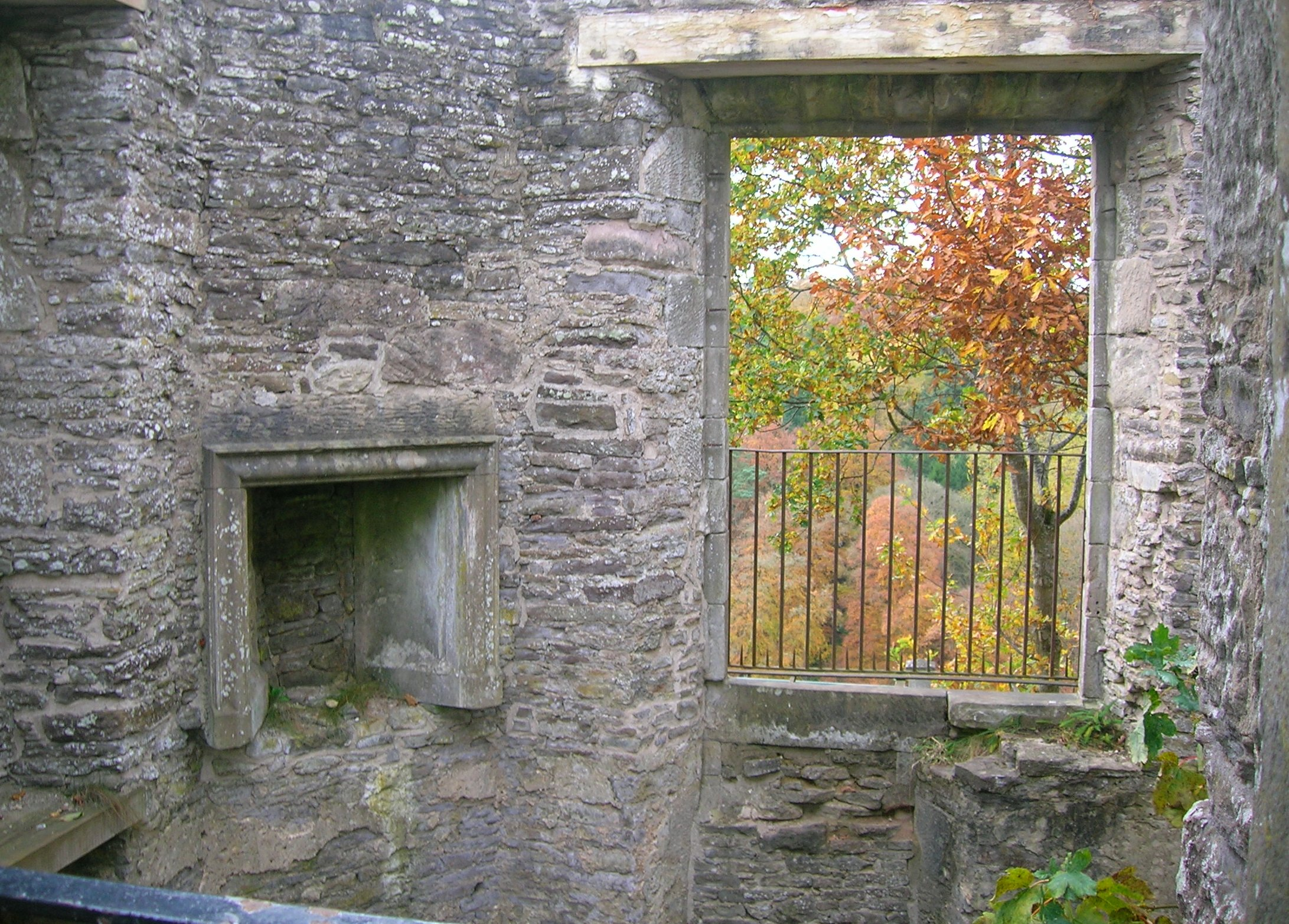
The old fireplace and the viewing or projection window from the inside.

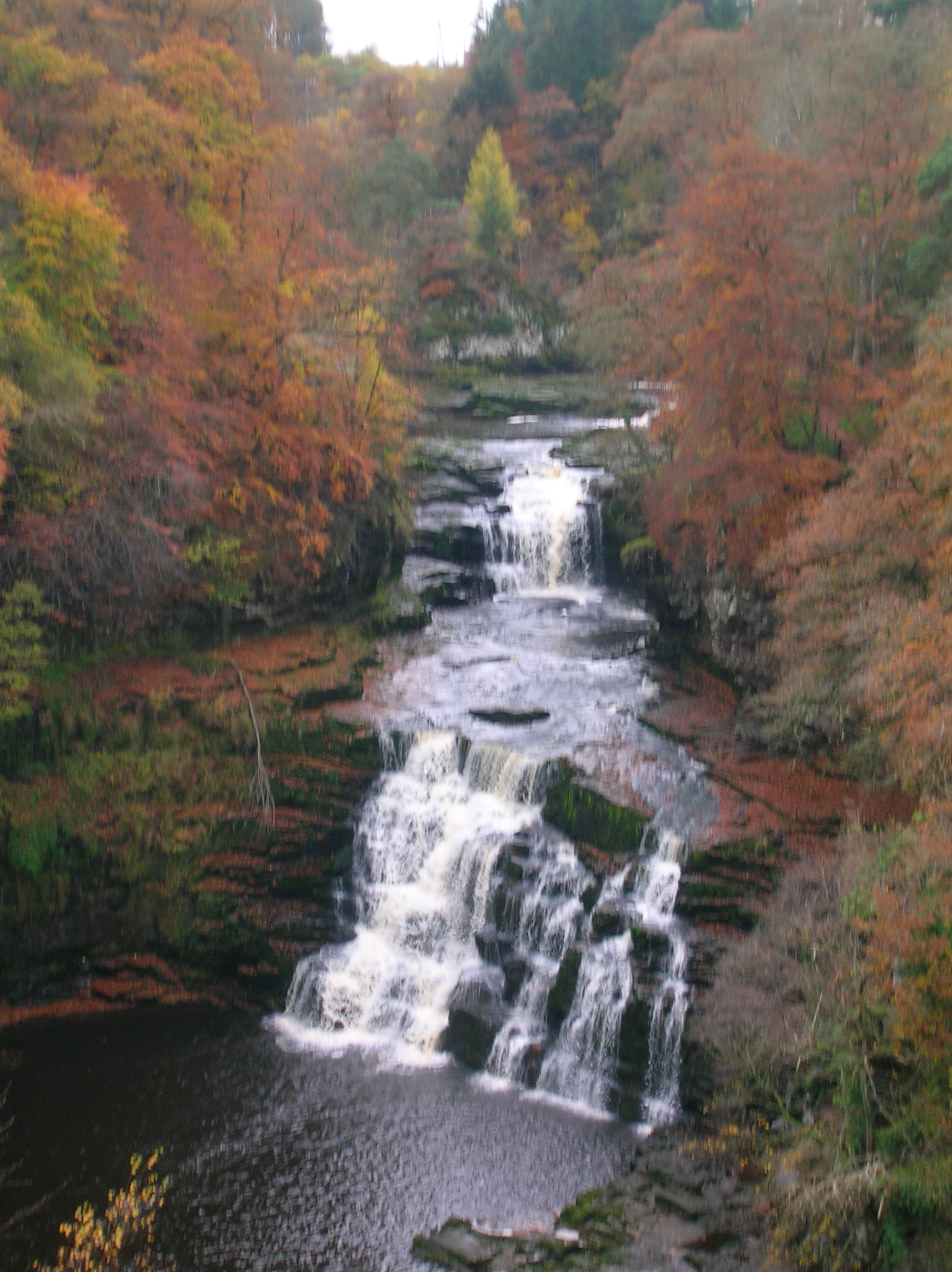
Corra Linn in the autumn.

== Famous visitors ==
The interpretation board at the Falls of Clyde viewpoint records that J. M. W. Turner, Sir Walter Scott, Samuel Taylor Coleridge and his friend William Wordsworth all visited. Turner produced a painting of the falls and Wordsworth immortalised Corra Linn in verse in 1802. We cannot be sure that they visited the pavilion, but it is not unlikely, given the presence of a guide at Bonnington House lodge.

The Oxford educated cleric Rev. William Gilpin (1724–1804), a schoolmaster in Surrey, toured Britain and visited the Falls of Clyde. He built an enormously influential theory on this convergence of travel and artistic recreation. John Stoddart relates that when he visited in 1799 - 1800 the mansion house of Bonnyton (Bonnington) was the seat of Lady Ross. He commends her for permitting unrestricted access to the falls and states that a porter was based at the Bonnyton Lodge house who would escort visitors to the best viewing points and to the 'summer-house' as he calls it. Most frustratingly he did not wish to be 'restrained' and failed to visit the actual pavilion itself.

=== Falls of Clyde views ===
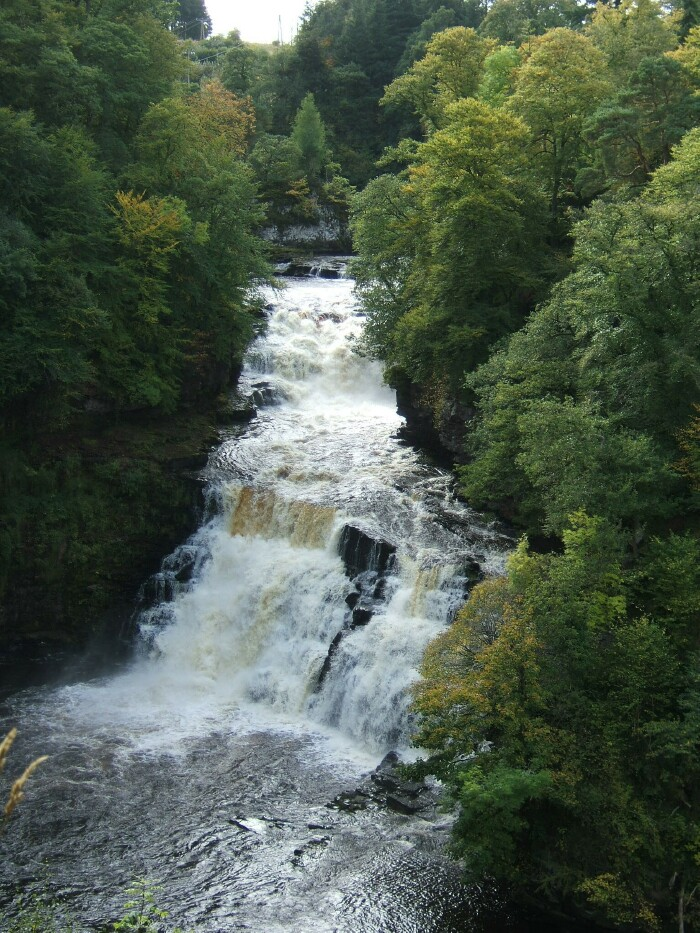
Corra Linn

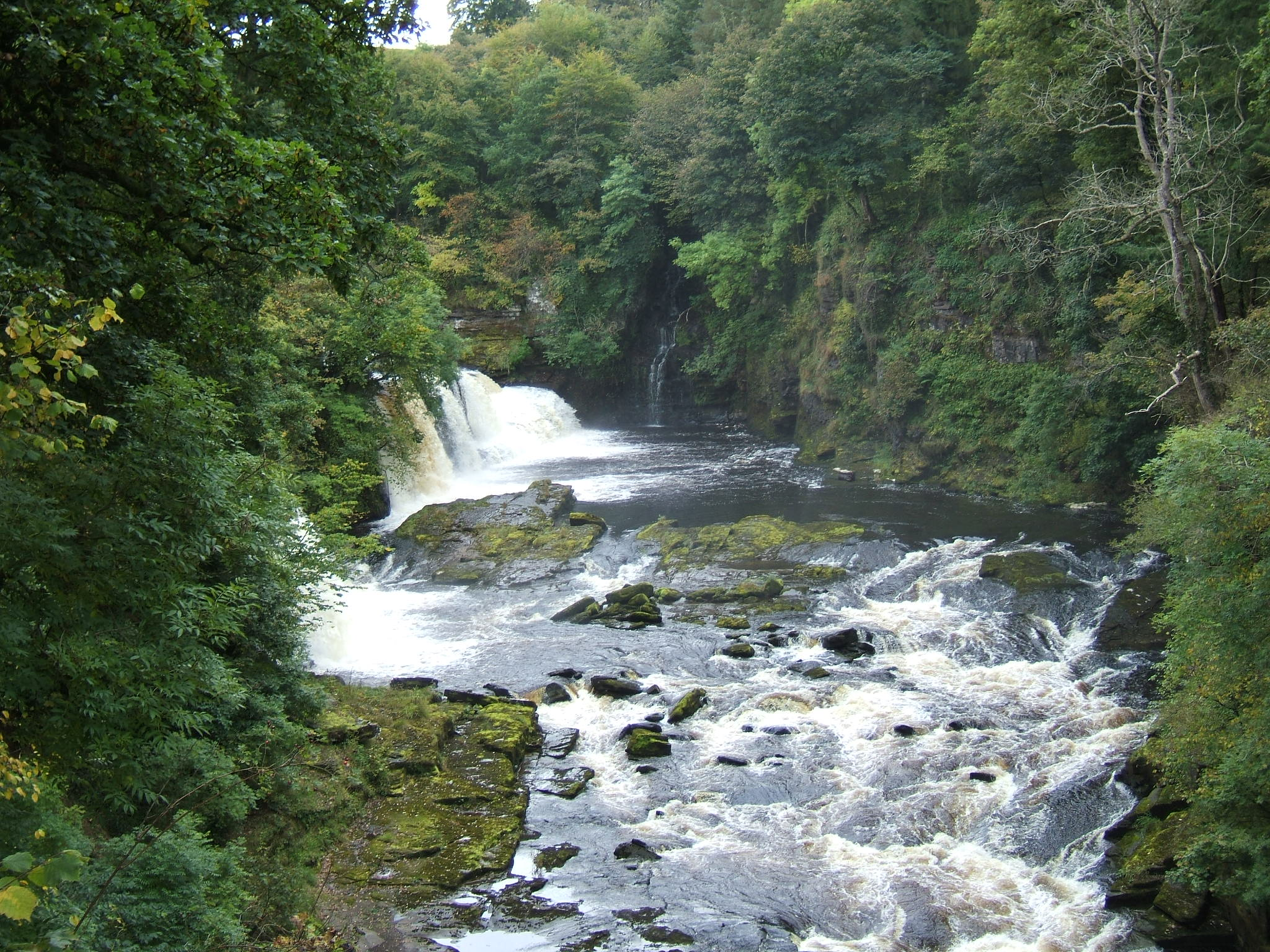
Bonnington Linn.

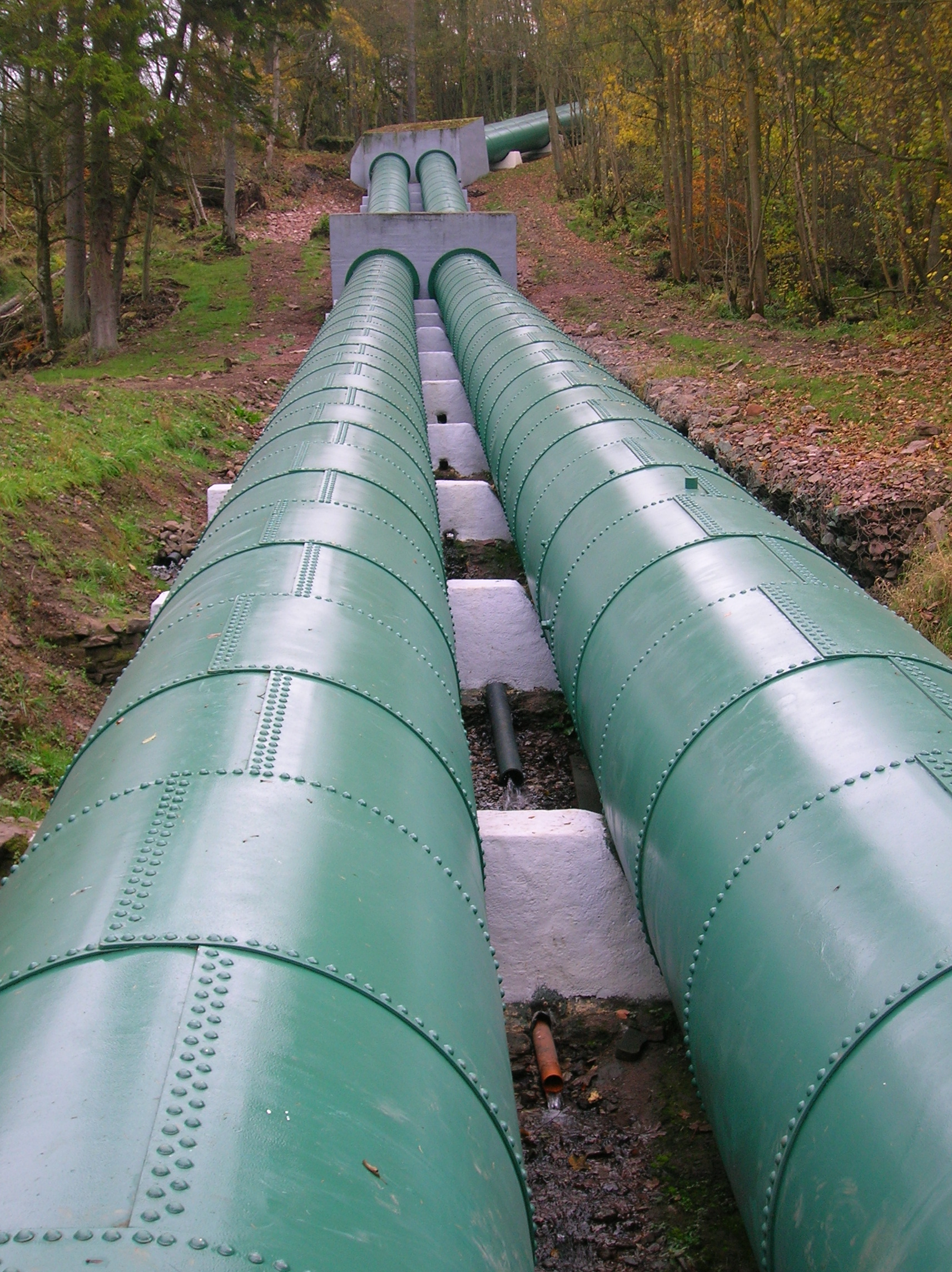
The pipes supplying water from the Clyde to Bonnington hydroelectric power station which run past the pavilion.

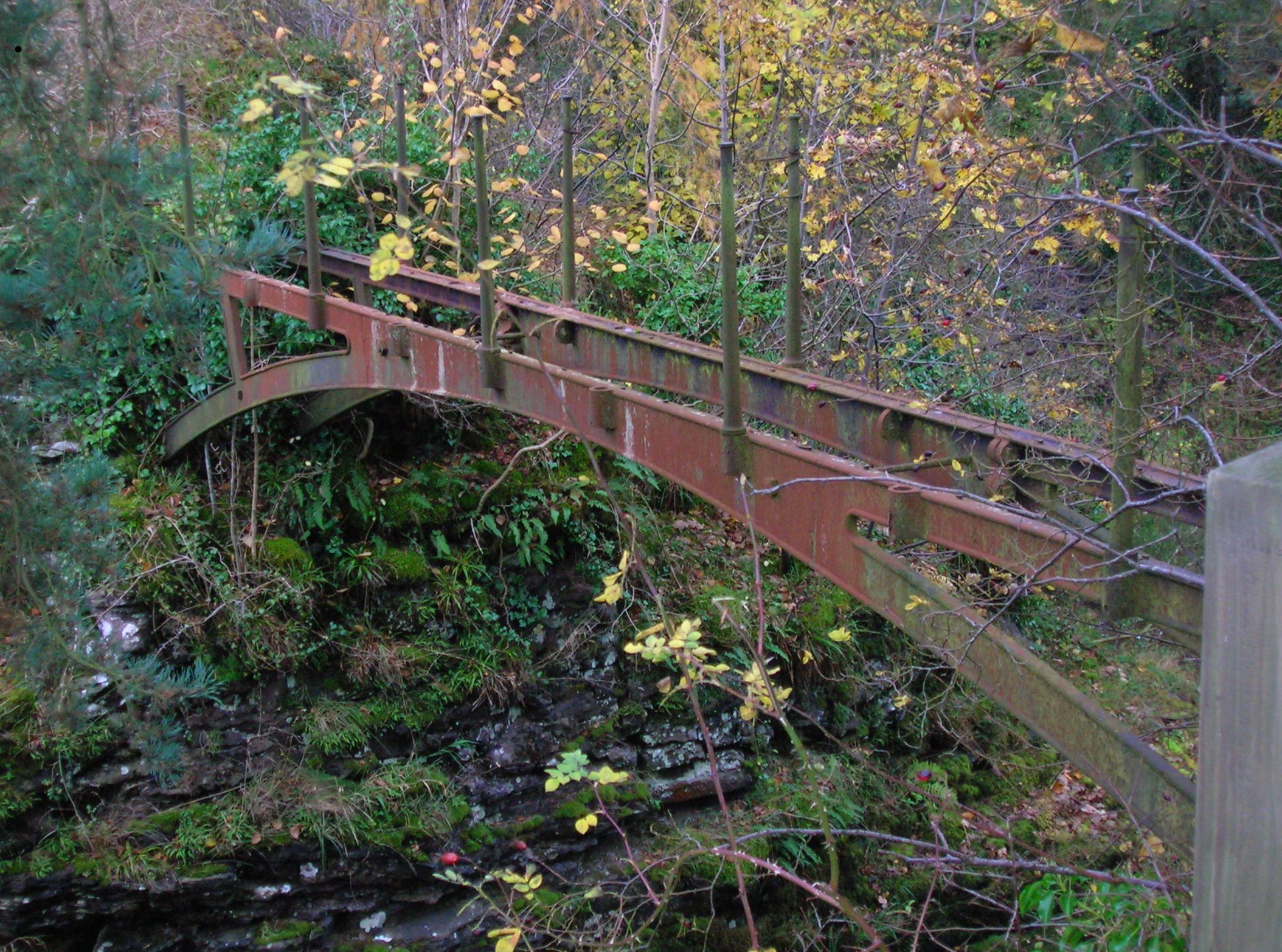
The old iron bridge at the Bonnington Falls.

== Nearby points of interest ==
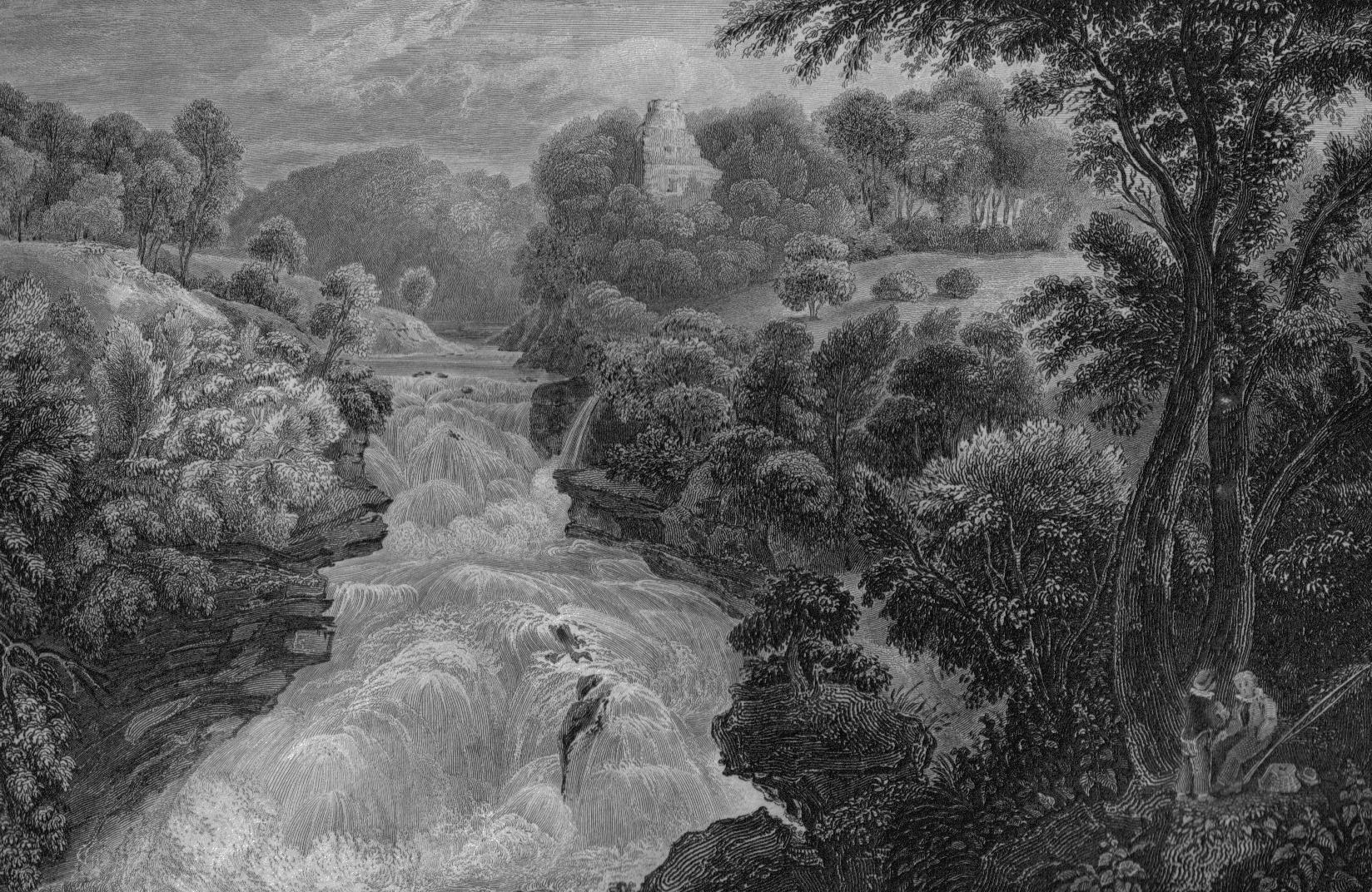
Corra Linn and Corra castle in 1830.

Wallace's Cave is a cavity in the face of the cliff near Corra Linn, nearly circular in form, 12 feet (3.7 m) in height and about 10 feet (3.0 m) in diameter. It is said to have been a hiding place of William Wallace, however the late Mr G Ross remembered the cave being formed during the construction of a swing bridge. Stoddart mentions the "Wallace's cove" in his records of his visit in 1799 - 1800.

Corra Castle's (also known as Corrax or Corehouse Castle) ruins are situated on the other side of the Clyde at map reference: NS 8822 4141. It belongs to the period from 1572 to 1700. The site of the castle is a precipitous rock which, on three sides, overlooks the Clyde. On the fourth are the remains of a ditch which at its west end drops down into a chasm. The ruins comprise remains of a tower and a small courtyard.

Corehouse is a large country house, sited to the north of the castle, and the estate which includes the castle grounds and the nature reserve.

== Similar structures ==
- Ossian's Hall of Mirrors

== See also ==
- New Lanark
- Lanark
