= Falls of Clyde (waterfalls) =

Group of waterfalls in Scotland

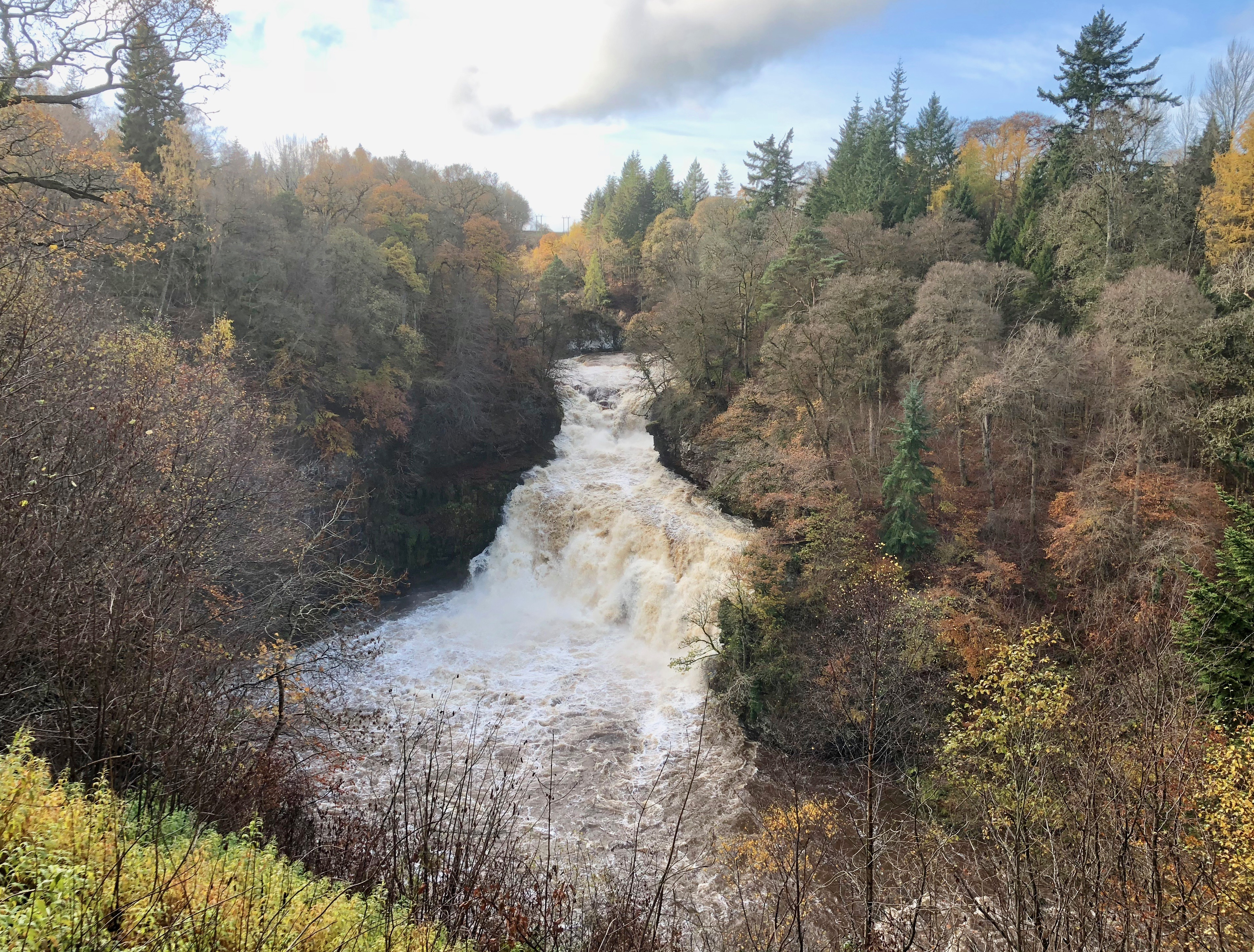
- Corra Linn in full spate

- Location within Scotland
- Location: Lanark, Scotland
- Coordinates: 55°39′12″N 3°46′36″W
- Number of drops: 4
- Longest drop: 26 m (84 ft)
- Watercourse: River Clyde
- World height ranking

Inventory of Gardens and Designed Landscapes in Scotland
- Official name: The Falls Of Clyde
- Designated: 31 March 2006
- Reference no.: GDL00358

The Falls of Clyde are a series of linns or waterfalls on the River Clyde, near Lanark, Scotland. They are renowned for their beauty and have frequently been painted by artists. There are four in total: Bonnington Linn, Corra Linn, and Dundaff Linn, all above Lanark, and Stonebyres Linn, some distance below the town. The highest and most impressive of the four is Corra Linn, with a fall of 84 feet (26 m).

== History ==
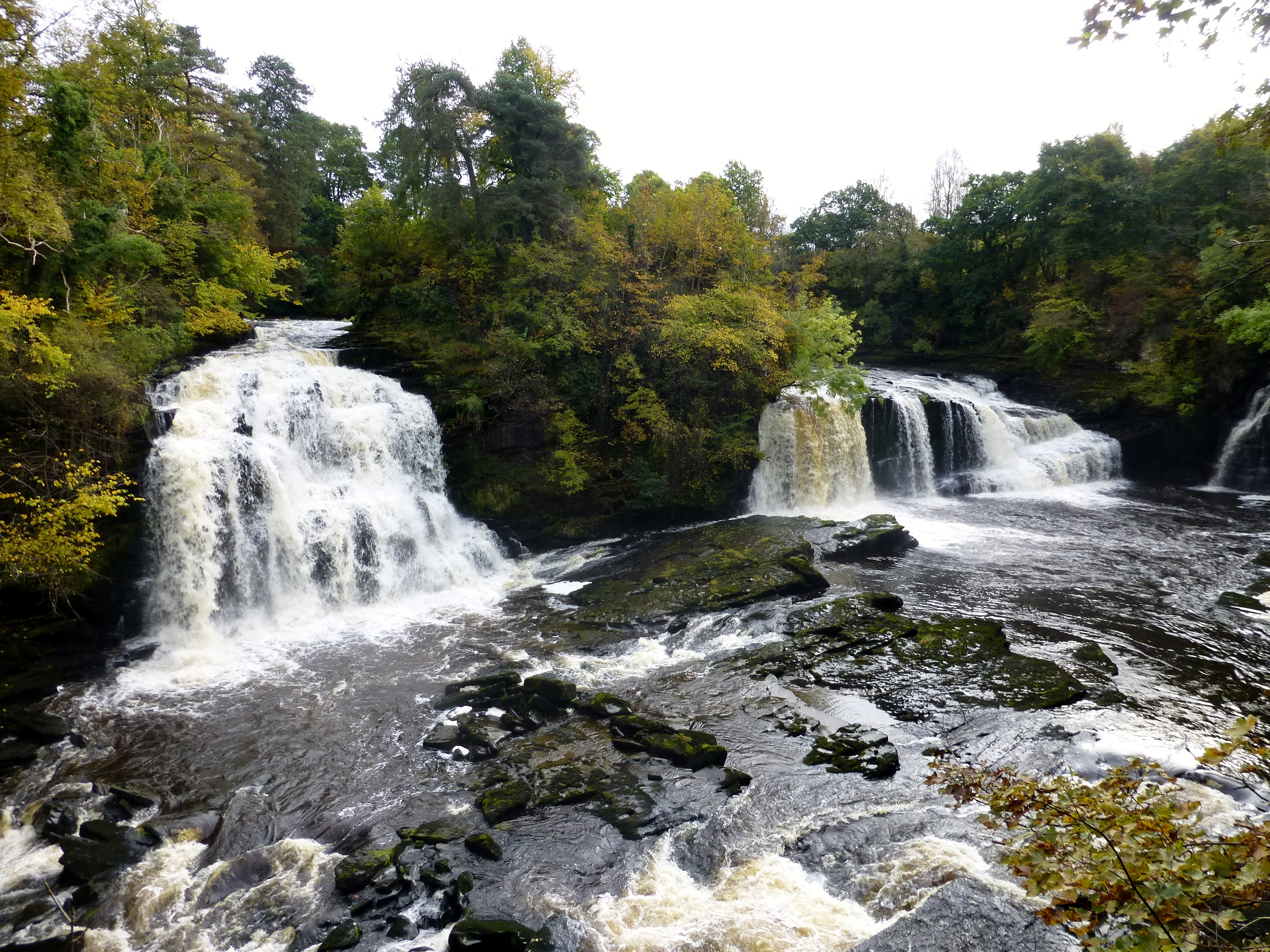
Bonnington Linn

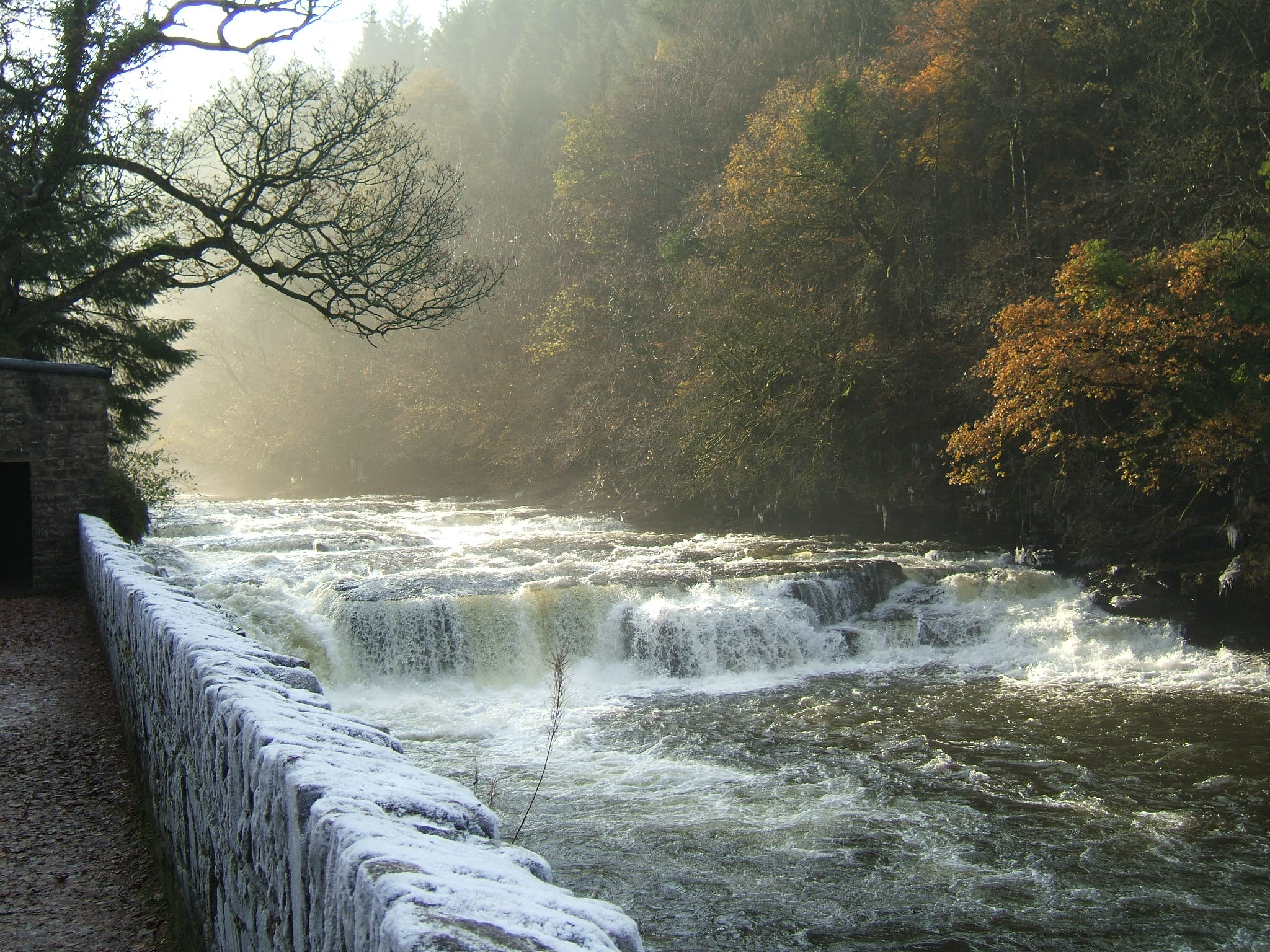
Dundaff Linn, seen from New Lanark

The area is a destination for visitors. The Wordsworths, Coleridge and Sir Walter Scott all visited the Falls. In 1802, William Wordsworth wrote a poem about Corra Linn, the largest of the waterfalls. Corra Linn has been painted by artists, including J. M. W. Turner. A legend gives "Cora" as a daughter of King Malcolm II, who leapt to her death here whilst trying to escape imagined danger.

Near Corra Linn is the Pavilion, built by Sir John Carmichael of Bonnington, probably in 1708. The Pavilion had mirrors on its back wall, and when the doors were opened visitors had the illusion of standing beneath the falls. The 15th-century Corra Castle is next to Corra Linn. It is now home to Daubenton's, Natterer's and whiskered bats. Corra is Gaelic for "weir", and as Corra Castle's early history is vague, some historians believe it was an early possession of the Weirs, the principal landowning family in the county after the Dukes of Hamilton from the 13th to 19th centuries. Corehouse, built in 1844, the home of the Cranstoun family, is nearby.

== Falls of Clyde Site of Special Scientific Interest ==
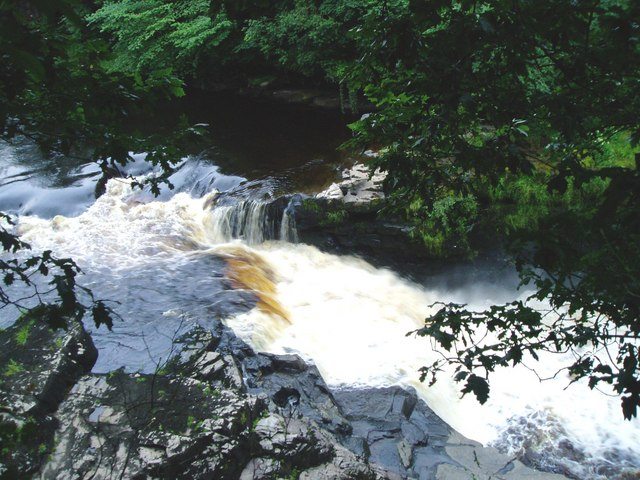
Stonebyres Linn

The Falls of Clyde Site of Special Scientific Interest (formerly the Corehouse Nature Reserve), a part of the Clyde Valley Woodlands National Nature Reserve, is an area of mixed woodland, including semi-natural native oakwoods and some areas of conifer plantation. It provides suitable habitat for badgers, roe deer, and over 100 species of bird. The site has a breeding pair of peregrine falcons, which are protected during the breeding season by Operation Peregrine, providing security for the birds and a chance for the public to view the birds through scopes and CCTV. Within the reserve the Clyde River is suitable habitat for otters and kingfishers as well as the protected brook lamprey.

The Falls of Clyde Visitor Centre, operated by the Scottish Wildlife Trust, features exhibits about the waterfalls, the woodland and the area animals, including a special bat display.

== Hydro-electric power ==
The Lanark Hydro Electric Scheme is situated between Corra Linn and Dundaff Linn, with a water inlet at Bonnington Linn, and is considered the oldest of the United Kingdom.

The scheme was conceived in 1925 under the chairmanship of Sir Edward MacColl and was completed in 1927 as the first hydro-electric power station in Scotland designed for public supply, rather than industry. The power station at Stonebyres was designed by Sir Robert Lorimer (who also acted as design advisor to the committee looking at the overall concept).

The plant generates approximately eleven megawatts of power. Another hydro-electric power station is situated near Stonebyres Linn, about three miles south of Corra Linn. This generates approximately six megawatts of power. Both stations are owned and operated by Scottish Power.

== See also ==
- List of waterfalls
- List of waterfalls in the United Kingdom
