= Scottish Wildlife Trust =

Scottish charitable organisation

- (Scottish Gaelic: Urras Fiadh-bheatha na h-Alba)
- Formation: 1964
- Type: Wildlife Trust
- Headquarters: Harbourside House, Leith, Edinburgh
- Members: 41,956 (March 2025)
- Official language: English
- Chair: Kenny Taylor
- Chief Executive: Jo Pike
- Website: Scottish Wildlife Trust website

The Scottish Wildlife Trust (Scottish Gaelic: Urras Fiadh-bheatha na h-Alba) is a registered charity dedicated to conserving the wildlife and natural environment of Scotland.

The Trust's vision is for a network of healthy, resilient ecosystems on land and sea, supporting Scotland’s wildlife and people.

== Description ==
As of February 2026, the Trust had over 40,000 members. It acquired its first wildlife reserve in 1966 and now has approximately 100 reserves throughout Scotland, with visitor centres at Loch of the Lowes (Perth and Kinross), Montrose Basin (Angus), and the Falls of Clyde (South Lanarkshire). As well as providing homes for wildlife these sites are valuable places for people to interact with and enjoy nature. The Trust also seeks to influence and challenge legislation for the benefit of wildlife, and empower communities to engage with and protect nature.

The Scottish Wildlife Trust was a lead partner in a trial reintroduction of the Eurasian beaver to Scotland. Begun in 2009, the trial ran at Knapdale until 2014. The beaver was given native species status in 2016.

The trust is one of 46 Wildlife Trusts operating in the United Kingdom and the Crown Dependencies.

== Current major projects ==
Cumbernauld Living Landscape

Cumbernauld Living Landscape is a partnership initiative which works to restore greenspaces and connect local communities to nature in the town of Cumbernauld.

The initiative has worked with people across the town through its Living Windows and Creating Natural Connections project to improve habitats for wildlife, improve access to greenspaces, connect people to nature, and improve health and wellbeing through nature.

Its latest project is called Nurturing Natural Connections and is led by the Scottish Wildlife Trust, with partners North Lanarkshire Council, The Conservation Volunteers and Sanctuary Scotland, funded by The National Lottery Heritage Fund.

Living Seas

The Trust’s Living Seas team undertake community engagement and advocacy work focused on Scotland’s seas and marine wildlife.

From 2019 – 2024, the Oceans of Value project captured the range of values placed on the marine environment in Orkney, incorporating ecosystem services such as food, employment, recreation, wellbeing, carbon capture and biodiversity.

Since 2025, the Living Seas team have been working with coastal communities to increase ocean literacy across Scotland through the Sea the Connection project. The project identifies barriers to getting involved in policy level discussions about the marine environment, and empowers people who live or work on the sea to bring their experience and expertise into such discussions.

Living Seas is supported by the Esmée Fairbairn Foundation.

Riverwoods

Riverwoods is a partnership project working to establish a network of river woodlands and healthy river systems across Scotland. This will provide critical benefits, including flood protection, improved water quality and healthier fisheries, and contribute to addressing the twin challenges of climate change and biodiversity loss.

The project is working with partners towards the following goals:

- Collectively sharing knowledge of the science underpinning riparian woodland restoration;
- Supporting landowners to carry out practical conservation work;
- Identifying and addressing evidence and knowledge gaps;
- Showcasing best practice;
- Exploring novel forms of financing to enable riparian restoration to be carried out at scale.

The primary funder of Riverwoods is the National Lottery Heritage Fund.

Saving Scotland’s Red Squirrels

Saving Scotland’s Red Squirrels works with local communities to improve conditions for native red squirrels across Scotland, including by combating the spread of grey squirrels, which are an invasive non-native species in the United Kingdom.

Grey squirrels outcompete reds for food and habitat. Some grey squirrels also carry the squirrelpox virus. Studies show that grey squirrels can completely replace reds within 15 years and this process and can be up to 20 times faster when squirrelpox is present.

The project uses public sightings and data from its own monitoring methods to track populations of both red and grey squirrels.

Saving Scotland's Red Squirrels is funded by the Scottish Government's Nature Restoration Fund, managed by NatureScot.

Ayrshire Nectar Network

The Ayrshire Nectar Network is a project led by the Scottish Wildlife Trust to create and connect nectar and pollen-rich habitats in both North Ayrshire and South Ayrshire Council areas. The project working with local community groups to establish pollinator highways by planting pollinator-friendly trees and wildflowers.

Words of the Wild

Words of the Wild is an annual nature writing competition which was first run in 2024 to celebrate the Scottish Wildlife Trust’s 60^{th} anniversary. Entrants must submit an original piece of written work, such as a poem or a personal story, about Scotland’s wildlife and wild places. Adult and junior winners are selected for each language category: English, Scots and Scottish Gaelic.

== Selected reserves ==
- Bemersyde Moss
- Handa Island
- Falls of Clyde
- Montrose Basin
- Loch Fleet
- Loch of the Lowes
- Pease Dean, Scottish Borders

== See also ==
- The Royal Society of Wildlife Trusts
