= Earnock Estate =

Housing estate in Hamilton, South Lanarkshire, Scotland

Coordinates: 55°46′4″N 4°4′40″W

Earnock Estate is a residential area in Hamilton, South Lanarkshire, Scotland, which is located east of High Earnock and south of Hillhouse. The area was developed in the 1960s and is home to some of the oldest buildings in the area.

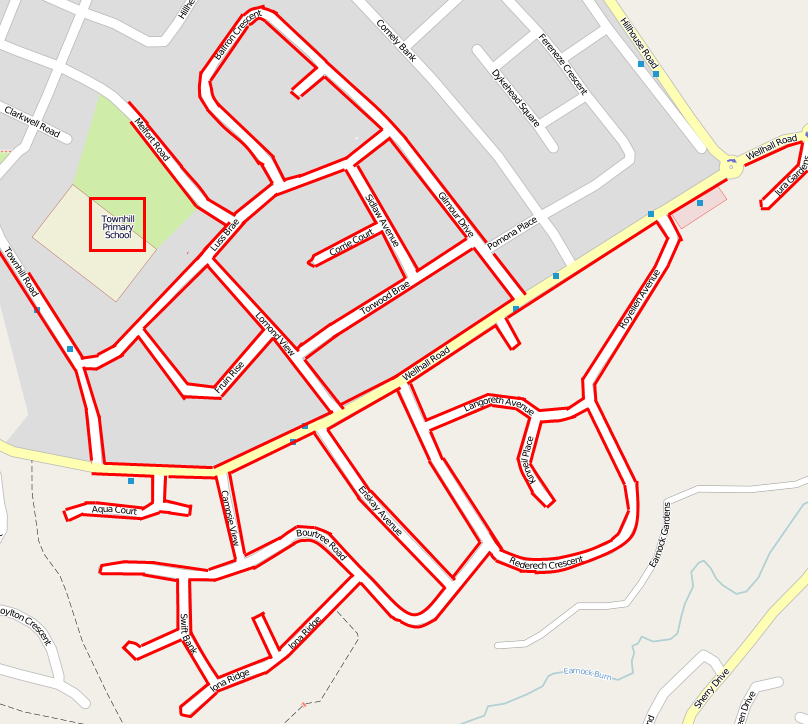
Map of Earnock Estate. Streets (and parts of streets) that are highlighted in red are part of the Earnock Estate area.

== Amenities ==
Almost all amenities with Earnock Estate are located on Wellhall Road, the main road running through the estate that links all parts of the neighbourhood.

=== Shops ===
There are four shops within the Earnock area, all on Wellhall Road: Fillipetti's (small licensed convenience shop), Aldi supermarket (opened in winter 2006, built on the site of a former Safeway store) an Esso petrol station and a Boots chemist (formerly part of the Moss chain, and before that known as The Wellhall Pharmacy) is located on the corner of Hillhouse Road and Wellhall Road.

=== Public houses ===
Earnock's only public house, The Avon, was located on Wellhall Road. It was demolished in 2016 to make way for a new residential development.

=== GP surgeries ===
Earnock is home to one GP surgery, the Wellhall Medical Centre. The surgery opened in the mid-1990s and is located at 4 Hillhouse Road.

=== Community centre ===
The Hillhouse & Earnock Community Centre is situated on Hillhouse Road and is used by residents of both Hillhouse and Earnock. It was reopened in 2003 having undergone refurbishment after an arson attack in 2001. Facilities include a main hall which can be divided into two smaller halls (Jubilee Hall and the Hillhouse Room), a youth area, a crèche, a large library and an 'Active IT' area which provides computers, printing facilities and internet access for free. A café is also operated in the centre by local volunteers. The Routes to Work project is based in the Earnock Room and the Wellhall and Udston rooms are used for a range of activities organised by the Up4It project.

=== Parks and walking paths ===
Iona Ridge Park is situated at the centre of the estate, off Iona Ridge. At the moment this is just a large grassy park, however it previously had swings, a roundabout and climbing frames. The park has ample room for games of football or golf practice and access can be gained to the local "nature trail" or, as it is known to local children, "The Natchy" (nate-chay). The nature trail is a disused railway now transformed into a path. The path runs to Strathaven Road, and many residents can also gain access to it through their back gates.

=== Churches ===
There are currently no churches in Earnock, however, in neighbouring Hillhouse there are two: the Church of Scotland Hillhouse Parish Church and the Catholic St Ninian's Church. David Burt, minister of the Parish Church, serves as school chaplain to local non-denominational schools.

== Education ==
=== Primary education ===
The primary aged children of Earnock Estate, High Earnock and Hillhouse are served by the non-denominational Townhill Primary School, situated on Melfort Road. The school was opened in 1965, although the original building has been replaced by the new school, which opened on 17 February 2010. The school has pupil roll of approximately 350. St Ninian's Primary School is also available to Catholic school children residing in the area.

=== Secondary education ===
High school provision for children in Earnock Estate is met by the non-denominational Calderside Academy, Blantyre. Calderside Academy opened on Monday 13 August 2007, bringing together the old Earnock High School and Blantyre High School and was initially split over two campuses – one on the former Blantyre site and one on the former Earnock site, with 1st to 3rd year pupils attending the Blantyre campus and 4th to 6th year the Earnock Campus. On Monday 7 January 2008 a new single building was opened on the site of the former Blantyre High, thus completing the merger.

Catholic secondary school-aged children in the area often attend John Ogilvie High School or Holy Cross High School, both in Hamilton.

== Transport ==
Public transport from Earnock Estate is accessed from Wellhall Road; there are currently three bus routes that serve the Earnock Estate:

- First Glasgow 226: Hillhouse - Hamilton Town Centre - Fairhill via Hillhouse, Burnbank, Peacock Cross (Hamilton West railway station), Hamilton Town Centre (Hamilton bus station and Hamilton Central railway station), Hamilton Palace Grounds, Low Waters Road, Fairhill and Little Earnock (limited service). (Monday - Sunday)
- JMB buses X1: Udston - Glasgow Buchanan Bus Station via Hillhouse, High Earnock, Earnock, Fairhill and Hamilton bus station.
- JJ Travel 228: High Earnock - Laighstonehall - Hamilton Town Centre via Earnock, Fairhill, Laighstonehall to Hamilton bus station (Sunday only).

Services that stop near Hamilton West and Hamilton Central stations allow bus for passengers to change onto one of the four trains per hour to Glasgow or four trains per hour alternating in destination between Larkhall and Motherwell (with one of the Motherwell services continuing to Cumbernauld).

== Street names ==
Many of the street names originate from the rulers of the ancient Kingdom of Strathclyde in the 6th century, e.g. Rederech Crescent (King Rederech), Langoreth Avenue (Queen Langoreth) and Royellen Avenue (Princess Royellen). It is said that the family's summer hunting lodge was in the Earnock area. Some of the streets are also named after famous geographical features of Scotland: Lomond View (Ben Lomond), Fruin Rise (Glen Fruin) and Iona Ridge (the island of Iona).

== Politics ==
=== Councillors ===
Earnock sits within the council ward of Hamilton West and Earnock and has four councillors who sit on South Lanarkshire Council. Since the 2017 election, these are:

Councillors for Earnock
Councillor	Party
Mary Donnelly	Scottish National Party
Allan Falconer	Scottish Labour Party
Graeme Horne	Scottish National Party
Mark McGeever	Scottish Liberal Democrats (Note: Initially elected as a Scottish Conservative councillor, switching allegiance in 2019.)

=== Scottish Parliament and UK Parliament ===
Earnock lies in the Hamilton, Larkhall and Stonehouse constituency of the Scottish Parliament and is represented by Christina McKelvie of the Scottish National Party since 2011.

In the UK Parliament, Earnock is represented by Michael Shanks of the Scottish Labour Party, who has been the MP for the Rutherglen and Hamilton West constituency since the 2023 Rutherglen and Hamilton West by-election.
