= A724 road =

Road in Scotland

Coordinates: 55.80280°N 4.11634°W

A724

Route information
- Length: 8.2 mi (13.2 km)

Major junctions
- Northwest end: Rutherglen
- Southeast end: Hamilton

Location
- Country: United Kingdom
- Constituent country: Scotland

Road network
- Roads in the United Kingdom; Motorways; A and B road zones
← A723	→ A725

The A724 road in Scotland runs within South Lanarkshire between Rutherglen and Hamilton. It follows an ancient route which is marked on William Roy's Lowland Map of Scotland (1755) with only minor deviations from its modern course.

== Route ==
=== Rutherglen and Cambuslang ===
The A724 starts in a mixed industrial/residential urban setting at Farme Cross (the junction named after Farme Castle which was located a short distance to the north-east) generating from the A749 which runs northwards towards Glasgow as Dalmarnock Road and southwards towards Rutherglen Main Street (B768) as Farmeloan Road. The A724 heads south-east – its general direction for its entire route, remaining on the left bank of the River Clyde – as Cambuslang Road, soon meeting Junction 2 of the M74 motorway (opened in 2011) which offers full on/off access in both directions. It then passes under a railway bridge carrying the Argyle Line and West Coast Main Line tracks (the motorway follows the WCML into Glasgow from this point) then meets the B768 at Richmond Park roundabout.

It is briefly a dual carriageway running past Eastfield then reverts to single carriageway passing close to Trinity High School before a junction with the end of the B762 (Dukes Road) towards Burnside. The A724 continues uphill, this time going over the WCML just prior to Cambuslang railway station, where there is also a northbound junction for Somervell Park (Cambuslang Rangers F.C.) and the southern end of the A763 (an unusually short road for this classification at 1.4 miles (2.3 km) that crosses the River Clyde, passes Carmyle and meets the M74 at Junction 3, then the A74 at Foxley where it downgrades to the B765 towards Shettleston).

The A724 continues as Cambuslang Main Street, which in the 21st century has a separate main carriageway and a service/parking section for the local shops, sited only on its south side. After a southbound junction with the B759 (Greenlees Road) which leads south up towards East Kilbride, it becomes a more standard dual carriageway for a few hundred yards – with a northbound junction with Clydeford Road providing another access route to the motorway – followed by bus stop laybys in either direction. It then reverts to single carriageway as Hamilton Road, passing over the WCML again, then under the railway bridge carrying the Cathcart Circle Line between Kirkhill and Newton and entering Halfway, where it is again the main shopping street – the area derives its name from being mid-distance between Glasgow and Hamilton on this ancient thoroughfare. Historically also a route used by Glasgow Corporation Tramways until the mid-20th century, some wider sections of roadway here feature one or both of central fences and hatched markings separating the lanes. The road passes Lightburn and Flemington to the south and Drumsagard to the north, a roundabout serving the latter neighbourhood's shops which are situated on the edge of the Greater Glasgow urban area.

=== Blantyre and Hamilton ===
Still called Hamilton Road, the A724 runs through about a mile of open countryside forming part of the green belt between the city and the fairly dense network of Lanarkshire towns, with a cycle lane flanking each direction. Upon crossing over the Rotten Calder and reaching Blantyre, it becomes Glasgow Road, and immediately has a staggered junction with the B758 (Bardykes Road / Blantyre Farm Road), which is a narrow and twisting former farm track but is fairly busy as it connects the M74 and A721 in North Lanarkshire further north, and the A725 East Kilbride Expressway further south. The A724 runs on though Blantyre past shops and close to Calderside Academy, with mini-roundabouts for the local hypermarket, leisure centre, an industrial estate and Castle Park (Blantyre Victoria F.C.), then meets the elevated A725 at an atypical junction – the eastbound offslip is about 0.7 miles (1.1 km) before the onslip, and the eastbound offslip is about 0.5 miles (0.80 km) after the main onslip and features an additional onslip also fed mainly from the A724, via a roundabout and underpass.

Running past the Springwell neighbourhood, the road enters Hamilton, flanked by older shops at the west side of Burnbank before fringing its south side as a mini-bypass constructed in the 1970s – the original route straight through the district is now designed for local access only, the two meeting again at a roundabout which is also a main route into the Whitehill neighbourhood. Continuing as Burnbank Road, it reaches the part of the burgh referred to as Hamilton West, where the main carriageway proceeds to Peacock Cross where the B755 (Wellhall Road, south-west) and the A72 (Almada Street, north-east) begin, while a one-way (east then south) arm at Clydesdale Street passes Hamilton West railway station, a retail park and South Lanarkshire Council's Headquarters, then meets back up with Almada Street.

From Peacock Cross, the A724 becomes Union Street, going over the Cadzow Burn and passing Hamilton Grammar School, then becomes Brandon Street where it ends close to Hamilton Bus Station and Hamilton Central railway station as part of the town centre's one-way system, eastbound lanes turning north as the B7071 (Leechlee Road) and westbound lanes joining from the A723 from the direction of Motherwell via Duke Street from the east and Portland Place to the south. The other lanes of the A723 act as the main route through south-eastern parts of Hamilton such as Eddlewood, eventually leaving the town on its way to Strathaven.

=== Public transport ===
The '267' bus service, one of the primary routes by the major operator in the region, First Glasgow, runs along most of the length of the A724 within South Lanarkshire, joining the B768 Rutherglen Main Street at Richmond Park roundabout (within Glasgow it mainly follows the A730).
