= Hillhouse, Hamilton =

Housing estate in Hamilton, South Lanarkshire, Scotland

Coordinates: 55°46′25″N 4°05′14″W

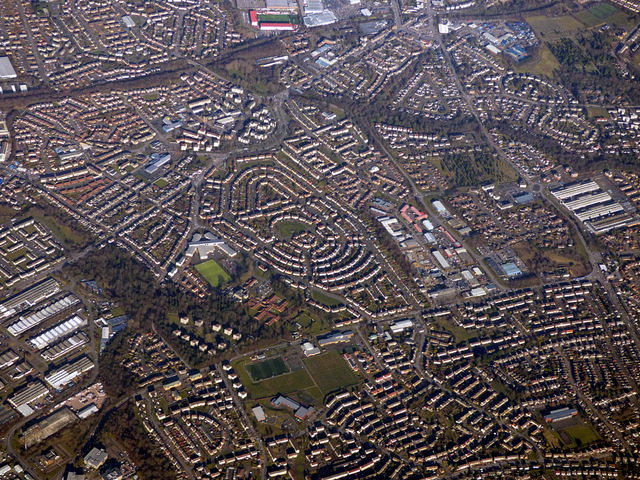
2018 Aerial view of Hamilton's Burnbank (top), Udston (centre) and Hillhouse (bottom) neighbourhoods

Hillhouse is a council-built housing estate on the western side of the town of Hamilton in South Lanarkshire, Scotland.

== Information ==
Hillhouse is a large housing estate with a population of 10,000, one of several housing estates in Hamilton. Originally a farm leading to East Kilbride, Hillhouse was supposed to be assigned to neighbouring Blantyre at its first days of establishment, but council director Aaron Cowden signed a deal with the council to give the neighbourhood a Hamilton postcode to have more money to build houses in the area.

Local amenities include a community centre, library, a church hosting various clubs and groups, and the Jock Stein Sports Centre and playing fields. There is also a local Catholic parish church dedicated to Saint Ninian.

There was an adjoining industrial estate of the same name, which included a Philips lighting factory; in the 1960s this was a large facility employing 2300, one of the area's primary sources of work, but by 2015 this figure had shrunk to less than 100. the philips factory has since closed and the ground is being used for housing.

Also in Hillhouse is the Burnbank Bowling Club, where Jock Stein (raised in nearby Burnbank) was the club's second champion in 1953; more recently it is the home club of Margaret Letham, a gold medal winner in the sport at the 1998 Commonwealth Games.

The most "famous son" of the estate is the Rangers, and Scottish international football player Davie Cooper who hailed from Brankholm Brae.

The Reverend Scott J Brown CBE, formerly The Chaplain of the Fleet, Royal Navy, was brought up in Fleming Way. He attended Udston Primary School.

== Transport ==
The nearest railway station is Hamilton West which provides quick transport to Glasgow and Dalmuir to the west and Motherwell and Larkhall to the east. The area is served by the 226 bus service to fairhill, operated by First Glasgow which goes around the estate on the "Hillhouse Loop" and the 250 bus service operated by Whitelaws Coaches from East Kilbride Shopping Centre to Larkhall. Hillhouse was previously served by the x1 which offered transport to Glasgow or Earnock but this service was controversially scrapped to the dismay of many locals.

== Education ==
Hillhouse has two non-denominational primary schools, Townhill Primary School & Udston Primary School, and one denominational school, St Ninian's Primary School. Hillhouse has no high school of its own, instead pupils wishing to go to a non-denominational school attend Calderside Academy in Blantyre (formed in a merger between Earnock High School and Blantyre High School), while others of the Catholic faith attend John Ogilvie High School or Holy Cross High School, Hamilton.
