= New Douglas Park =

Football stadium in Hamilton, Scotland

- Hamilton Community Stadium; NDP
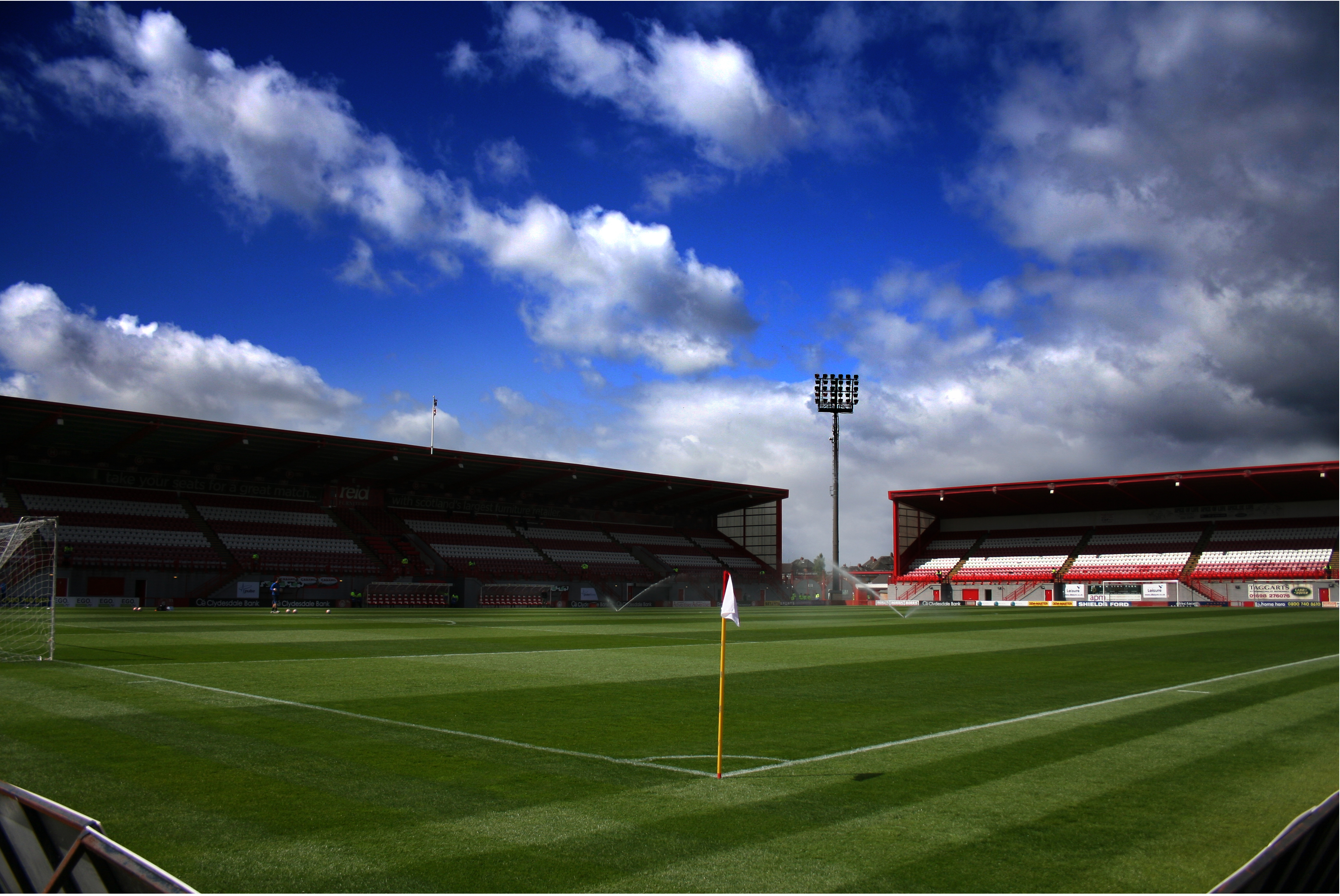

- Location within South Lanarkshire
- Former names: SuperSeal Stadium (2016–2018); Hope CBD Stadium (2018–2019); Fountain of Youth Stadium (2019–2022); ZLX Stadium (2022-2025)
- Location: Hamilton, Scotland
- Coordinates: 55°46′56″N 4°03′31″W
- Capacity: 6,018
- Surface: Grass (2001–2004); FieldTurf (2004–2008); Grass (2008–2013); TigerTurf (2013–2018); Greenfields MX (2018–)

Construction
- Opened: 2001

Tenants
- Hamilton Academical Hamilton Ac. Reserves/Youth Hamilton Ac. Women Clyde: 2001–2025; 2001–2025; 2003–present 2022–present

New Douglas Park, also known as The Hamilton Community Stadium for sponsorship reasons, is a football stadium in Hamilton, South Lanarkshire, Scotland, which serves as the home to Scottish League One side Hamilton Academical, as well as the current home of Scottish League Two side Clyde. It takes its name from Douglas Park, the Accies' former stadium which was located immediately to the south of the current site.

== Stadium ==
The stadium is located in the north of Hamilton, close to the Burnbank and Whitehill residential areas and to Hamilton West railway station. Construction of the stadium was completed by Ballast Nedam in 2001; the initial intention was for its name to be Ballast Stadium.

The pitch was converted to artificial FieldTurf in 2004, the more durable surface allowing the club to hold training sessions and youth academy matches there without damaging the playing field for first team matches. After Hamilton was promoted to the Scottish Premier League in May 2008, the artificial surface had to be replaced by grass due to league rules, an alteration which owner Ronnie MacDonald claimed had cost £850,000 (including the installation of undersoil heating). In addition to the turf replacement, a small temporary stand with a capacity of 500 was erected in March 2008 to bring the stadium's capacity up to the league requirement of 6,000 all seater.

At the beginning of season 2013–14, Hamilton returned to an artificial playing surface, this time produced by TigerTurf with an installation cost of £400,000. In June 2018, that surface was voted as the worst of 42 SPFL venues in a survey of the league's players. The following day, the club made public their intention to install a new Greenfields surface in time for the 2018–19 season, costing £750,000 and with the same specification as the SFA performance centre at Oriam.

From 2016 to 2019, New Douglas Park entered into various naming rights deals that saw the stadium renamed to SuperSeal Stadium, Hope CBD Stadium, and Fountain of Youth Stadium.

In April 2022, Clyde F.C. announced they would be leaving Broadwood Stadium at the end of the 2021–22 season, ending their 28-year stay in Cumbernauld. They will be ground-sharing at New Douglas Park from the start of the 2022–23 season, with a view of relocating to a new home back in Glasgow in the near future.

In October 2022, Glasgow-based tax credit consultancy ZLX Business Solutions entered into a naming rights deal for £108,000. The stadium would be known as ZLX Stadium for the next three seasons. At the end of the sponsorship deal it was renamed The Hamilton Community Stadium.

In 2025, amid wider issues relating to the finances and ownership at the club, Hamilton Academical announced they would not be continuing tenancy at New Douglas Park for the 2025–26 season and would instead be playing at Broadwood Stadium; as Clyde remained in Hamilton, the two clubs had essentially exchanged stadia. At the end of the season they played against each other in the 2026 playoff final, involving one leg at each ground with the traditional occupiers as the away side (Hamilton won 5–4 on aggregate).

== Records ==
The stadium's record attendance of 6,007 was set on 17 January 2015 when Hamilton played Celtic in a Scottish Premiership game.

== See also ==
- Stadium relocations in Scottish football
