= Lanarkshire Orchestral Society =

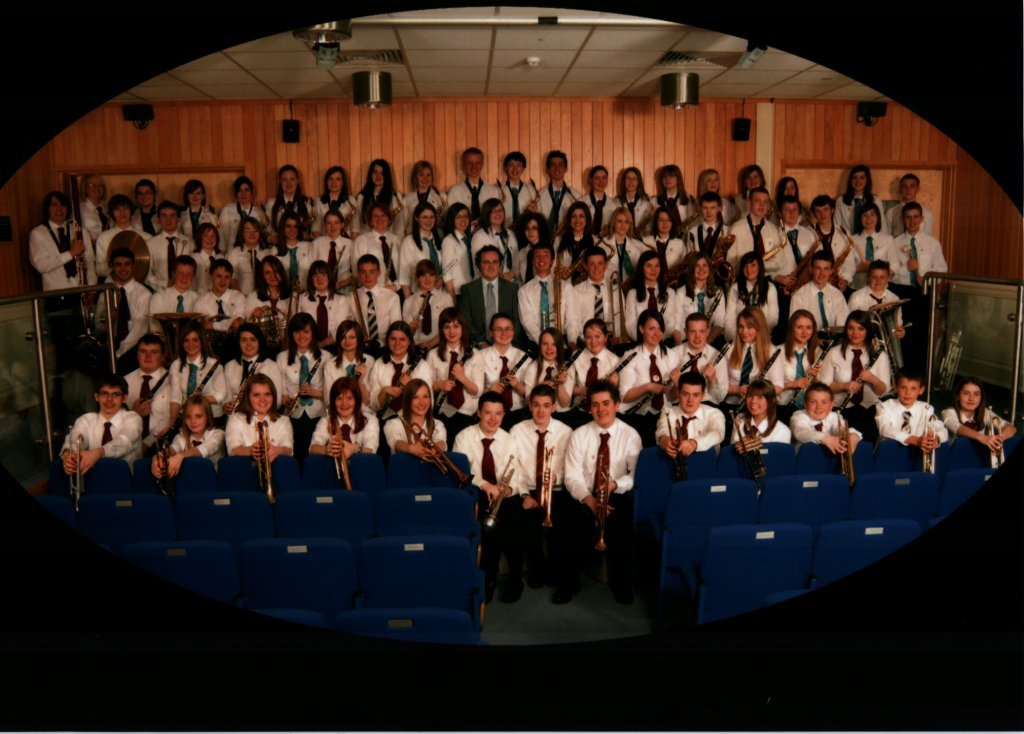
A Photo of the Lanarkshire Intermediate Wind Band At the 2008 British Wind Festival

The Glasgow Royal Concert Hall is an arts venue in the city of Glasgow, Scotland. The concert hall is operated by Glasgow's Concert Halls, which also runs Glasgow's City Halls and Old Fruitmarket.

The Lanarkshire Orchestral Society is a group of three concert bands and three String orchestras, based in Lanarkshire, Scotland. It was founded in 1958, by members of the then Director of Education. It has an age range of 8 to 23 years old.

== Concerts ==
The Lanarkshire Orchestral Society holds a concert four times a year at the Hamilton Townhouse - twice for the concert bands and twice for the String orchestras. The Concerts are held during the easter period and during the christmas period.

In 2009, the Lanarkshire Orchestral Society held a special 50th Anniversary Concert at the Glasgow Royal Concert Hall in Glasgow, Scotland.

| Lanarkshire Intermediate Wind Band | Jennifer Crate | 2009 | Lanarkshire Senior Wind Band | James McAleenan |}

== Honours ==
- Lanarkshire Intermediate Wind Band - National Wind Festival - Gold 2007.
- Lanarkshire Intermediate Wind Band - British Wind Festival - Silver April 20, 2007.
