= Bothwell Road Park =

Public park in Scotland

Coordinates: 55.785°N 4.052°W

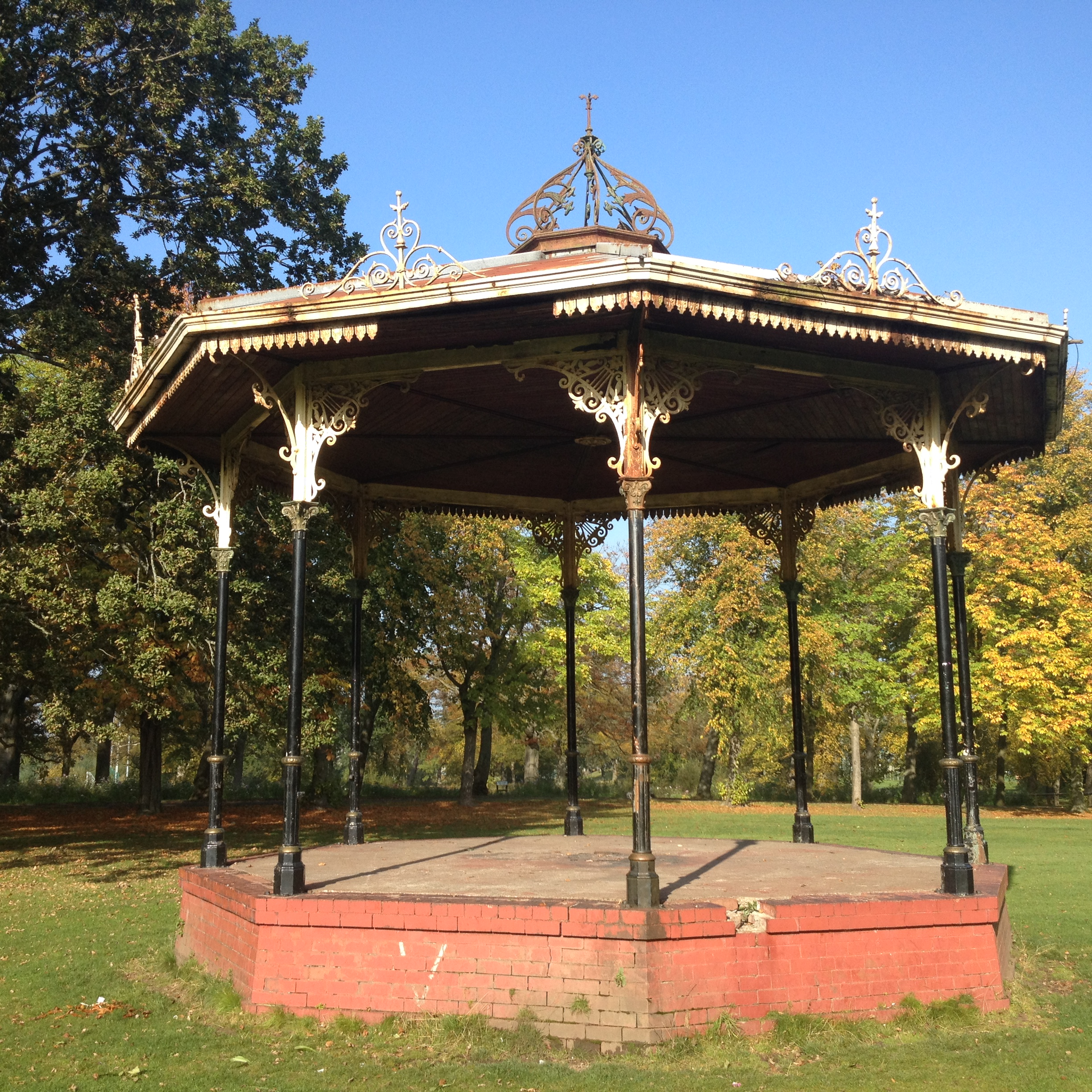
Hamilton Bandstand (1912) in Bothwell Road Park

Bothwell Road Park, also known as Hamilton Public Park, is a public park in Hamilton, South Lanarkshire, Scotland, which dates from 1894. It is located between the Hamilton West and Whitehill areas, around 1 mile (1.6 km) north of Hamilton town centre. The National Cycle Route 74 passes the front of the park, following Bothwell Road.

The Hamilton cenotaph is located within the park, as well as a traditional bandstand, erected in 1912, which is a category C listed building. Two statues by Robert Forrest which were originally created for local estates, The Fall of Mazeppa (1834) and The Gentle Shepherd (1852), were placed in the park in 1926. There are also areas of ancient woodland and a children's play area.
