= Lanark County Buildings =

Headquarters in Hamilton, Scotland of South Lanarkshire Council

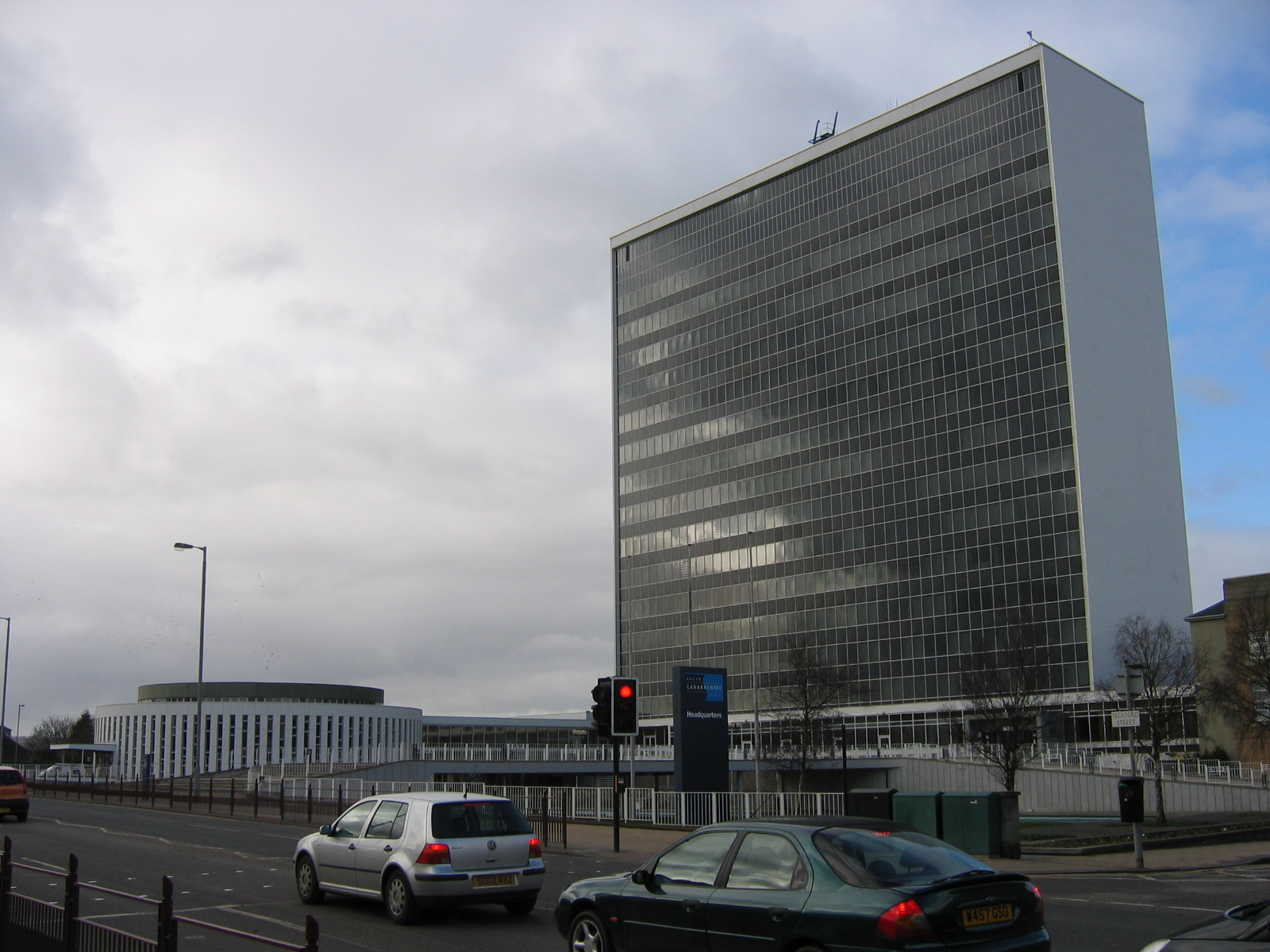
- Lanark County Buildings

- Shown in South Lanarkshire
- 55.7791°N 4.05082°W
- Location: 14 Almada Street, Hamilton, Scotland, ML3 0AA

History
- Built: 1964

Site notes
- Architect: David Gordon Bannerman
- Architectural style: International (Modernist)

Listed Building – Category A
- Designated: 18 November 1993
- Reference no.: LB34472

The Lanark County Buildings, also referred to as the South Lanarkshire Council Headquarters, is a local government facility in Hamilton, Scotland. It currently serves as the headquarters and meeting place of South Lanarkshire Council.

== History ==
Originally the headquarters of Lanark County Council (which had previously been based at Lanarkshire House in Ingram Street in Glasgow), between 1975 and 1996 it served the same function for the Strathclyde region's Lanark sub-region (which oversaw five smaller districts, including one for the Hamilton area based at the nearby Townhouse) then for the South Lanarkshire local authority since then.

Construction of the structure, which was undertaken by Laing Group to a design by the Lanarkshire County Architect, David Gordon Bannerman, in the International (Modernist) style, started in 1959; completed in 1964 with a ceremonial opening by the Queen Mother, the complex features a 17-storey 200 feet (61 m) office block, a separate debating chamber in a rotunda and an external plaza with fountains. Category A listed, the modernist design was influenced by the United Nations building in New York City. Glass curtain walls cover the north and south facades, with the narrow east and west sides being blank white walls.

Occupying a prominent position where the A72 and A724 roads meet within the Hamilton West district north of the town's historic centre, its upper floors offer views over the M74 motorway, much of Lanarkshire and parts of Greater Glasgow, and in turn it is the area's tallest building (slightly higher than the numerous residential tower blocks in nearby Motherwell, although some of those have more floors) and one of its most recognisable landmarks. Immediately to the east is the neo-classical Hamilton Sheriff Court building, also Category A listed.

== See also ==
- DoCoMoMo Key Scottish Monuments
- List of Category A listed buildings in South Lanarkshire
- List of listed buildings in Hamilton, South Lanarkshire
- List of post-war Category A listed buildings in Scotland
- Prospect 100 best modern Scottish buildings
