= 1955–56 Dundee United F.C. season =

Dundee United
1955–56 season
- Chairman: J. Johnston-Grant
- Manager: Reg Smith
- Stadium: Tannadice Park
- Scottish Second Division: 8th W12 D14 L10 F78 A65 P38
- Scottish Cup: Round 5
- League Cup: Group stage

The 1955–56 season was the 48th year of football played by Dundee United, and covers the period from 1 July 1955 to 30 June 1956. United finished in eighth place in the Second Division.

== Match results ==
Dundee United played a total of 45 competitive matches during the 1955–56 season.

=== Legend ===
Win
Draw
Loss

All results are written with Dundee United's score first. Own goals in italics

=== Second Division ===
Date	Opponent	Venue	Result	Attendance	Scorers
24 August 1955	Brechin City	A	2-2	2,000	
10 September 1955	Queen's Park	H	2-2	3,500	
14 September 1955	Forfar Athletic	H	2-2	5,000	
17 September 1955	East Stirlingshire	A	5-5	1,500	
21 September 1955	Alloa Athletic	H	6-2	4,000	
24 September 1955	St Johnstone	H	1-1	8,000	
28 September 1955	Forfar Athletic	A	1-1	1,500	
1 October 1955	Arbroath	A	4-2	3,800	
8 October 1955	Third Lanark	H	1-0	9,000	
15 October 1955	Hamilton Academical	A	0-3	4,000	
29 October 1955	Stenhousemuir	A	1-4	1,500	
5 November 1955	Cowdenbeath	H	4-4	9,000	
12 November 1955	Montrose	A	2-2	2,000	
19 November 1955	Ayr United	H	3-3	9,500	
26 November 1955	Stranraer	A	0-2	2,000	
3 December 1955	Albion Rovers	A	1-1	2,000	
10 December 1955	Greenock Morton	H	4-2	2,000	
17 December 1955	Berwick Rangers	A	2-3	2,000	
26 December 1955	Brechin City	H	3-1	4,000	
31 December 1955	Dumbarton	A	0-2	5,500	
2 January 1956	St Johnstone	A	0-2	10,000	
7 January 1956	East Stirlingshire	H	4-0	5,500	
14 January 1956	Queen's Park	A	0-0	9,222	
21 January 1956	Arbroath	H	2-1	8,000	
28 January 1956	Third Lanark	A	1-0	7,000	
11 February 1956	Hamilton Academical	H	3-3	3,000	
25 February 1956	Alloa Athletic	A	0-1	1,500	
3 March 1956	Stenhousemuir	H	1-0	5,500	
10 March 1956	Cowdenbeath	A	2-3	3,000	
17 March 1956	Montrose	H	6-3	3,000	
24 March 1956	Ayr United	A	0-1	5,000	
31 March 1956	Stranraer	H	2-2	4,500	
7 April 1956	Albion Rovers	H	2-0	3,000	
18 April 1956	Greenock Morton	A	2-3	1,000	
21 April 1956	Berwick Rangers	H	8-1	3,000	
25 April 1956	Dumbarton	H	1-1	2,000	

=== Scottish Cup ===
Date	Rd	Opponent	Venue	Result	Attendance	Scorers
22 October 1955	R4	Dumbarton	H	4-1	12,000	
4 February 1956	R5	Dundee	H	2-2	20,000	
8 February 1956	R5 R	Dundee	A	0-3	17,000	

=== League Cup ===
Date	Rd	Opponent	Venue	Result	Attendance	Scorers
13 August 1955	G7	Albion Rovers	H	1-3	10,000	
17 August 1955	G7	Motherwell	A	1-7	8,000	
20 August 1955	G7	Forfar Athletic	A	5-2	1,600	
27 August 1955	G7	Albion Rovers	A	3-3	3,000	
31 August 1955	G7	Motherwell	H	0-3	10,000	
3 September 1955	G7	Forfar Athletic	H	3-2	2,700	

== See also ==
- 1955–56 in Scottish football
