= Jim Mullen (disambiguation) =

Jim Mullen may also refer to:

- Jim Mullen (born 1945) - Glasgow-born jazz guitarist.
- Jim Mullen (baseball) (1883–1925) - American Major League Baseball player
- Jim Mullen (businessman) (born 1970) - a British businessman
