= Burnbank =

Area of Hamilton, South Lanarkshire, Scotland

Coordinates: 55°46′40″N 4°04′31″W

Burnbank is an area in the town of Hamilton, South Lanarkshire, Scotland. It was formerly a separate mining village before being absorbed into the town.

== Location and governance ==
Burnbank, previously an independent settlement, then part of Hamilton Burgh (in the historic County of Lanarkshire) and then Hamilton District (in the historic Strathclyde Region) is now a district of Hamilton within the South Lanarkshire Unitary Council. Today Burnbank is surrounded by other suburban neighbourhoods, bordered by Hillhouse and Udston to the south, the western part of Hamilton to the east, Whitehill to the north and the town of Blantyre to the west, with the Park Burn denoting the boundary.

Burnbank is named after a tributary of the River Clyde - the Wellschaw Burn (also known as the Shawburn) which flows through the eastern areas of the district. This has been culverted for most of its passage through modern Burnbank. In historic times this stream's confluence with the Clyde lay within the district but now lies in neighbouring Whitehill. The area around the burn was still open country in some regards as late as the 1901 Census which records a Romany family "living in a field near Shawburn, Burnbank.

Burnbank was a division (later ward) of the Hamilton Constituency in the House of Commons between 1918 and 1997. It then became part of the short-lived Hamilton North and Bellshill Constituency between 1997 and 2005. Since 2005 it has been part of Rutherglen and Hamilton West.

Burnbank was part of the Hamilton North and Bellshill Constituency for the Scottish Parliament but is now part of Hamilton, Larkhall and Stonehouse.

== History ==
It was predominantly rural, with a number of plantations (Whistleberry Plantation and Backmuir Plantation being most prominent) to feed the lace industry in Burnbank and Hamilton which had been sponsored since before 1778 by the then Duchess of Hamilton Elizabeth Campbell, 1st Baroness Hamilton of Hameldon.

With the Industrial Revolution Burnbank lost its rural identity becoming a mining village.

The population of Burnbank had grown so great by the 1870s that a committee of citizens decided to apply for the erection of a Burgh of Burnbank. At the same time residents of Burnbank's western neighbour Blantyre reacted by petitioning for the erection of a Burgh of Blantyre. Both cases came before the Sheriff Court sitting at Glasgow. The Sheriff gave extra time for the petitioners for both causes to familiarise themselves with the arguments of their opponents and to respond in turn. The Provost and Burgesses of the existing Burgh of Hamilton, alarmed at the prospect of one (or possibly both) petitions being successful and thus creating a heavily industrialised, modern and vibrant western rival in turn petitioned the Parliament of the United Kingdom giving rise to the Burgh of Hamilton Act 1878. By this Act Burnbank was absorbed into Hamilton - ending its own burghal aspirations.

== Industry ==
Prior to the nineteenth century agriculture and lace making were important local industries.

Burnbank was home to a number of coalmines or pits. Miners' cottages or "pit rows" were erected by mine owners to house their employees. Many of these were built by local builder Sir Robert McAlpine, 1st Baronet early in his career and the foundation of his later wealth.

The Udston mining disaster occurred in Hamilton, Scotland on Saturday, 28 May 1887 when 73 miners died in a firedamp explosion at Udston Colliery. Caused, it is thought, by unauthorised shot firing the explosion is said to be Scotland's second worst coal mining disaster.

Keir Hardie, then Secretary of the Scottish Miners' Federation, denounced the deaths as murder a few days later.

In August 1918 a fire at Albany Buildings (an apartment block owned by the mining company John Watson Ltd) burned to the ground causing £10,000 of damage and leaving 24 families homeless.

In September 1919 strike action in the Lanarkshire coal fields led to the closure of the Greenfield Colliery.

In May 1932 300 men at John Watson's Earnock Colliery in Burnbank were thrown out of work because of "bad trace."

In January 1935 Greenfield Colliery, Burnbank, became the last pit in Hamilton to shut permanently. Earnock Colliery also in Burnbank but out-with Hamilton's boundaries continued working.

During the Second World War Burnbank suffered at least one attack by the Luftwaffe when a bomb was dropped on tenements (known locally as Sing-Sing) near the railway works on the Whitehill Road.

In addition to mining a number of other medium-sized industrial concerns have operated within Burnbank including the Stevenson Carpet Factory, Burnbank, at which Jock Stein had his first job in 1935. This is recorded in the Hamilton Advertiser as opening a new factory worth £85,000 in 1958. MEA also operated a factory in the area for many years.

A railway wagon cleaning works is located near Whitehill Road.

== Immigration ==
Since the 19th century immigrants from many parts of the world have settled in Burnbank.

Immigration from other parts of Scotland during the period of the Highland Clearances occurred.

The most significant to date numerically were undoubtedly the Irish immigrants who arrived between the mid 19th century and the mid 20th century mainly to work in the coal-fields and heavy industry.

Immigration to Burnbank from Italy was mainly from the Lucca and Frosinone in the Abruzzi. Some of the Italian Scots in Burnbank owned ice-cream parlours (which later became fish and chip shops) and operated ice-cream carts (later vans) to such an extent that the local term for an ice-cream seller became "tally" (derived from Italian) as in "tally van".

Immigration to Burnbank from Poland and the Baltic states first came to prominence between the world wars (linked to the mining industry) and was sustained by individuals escaping from the Nazi and USSR occupation of those countries. Further immigration from Poland (and Central Europe generally) has taken place following the collapse of the Iron Curtain.

Immigration from the former territories of British India has occurred in the final decades of the 20th century with immigrants from these countries following in the footsteps of the Italians by entering the catering industry.

== Transport ==
Burnbank was formerly the site of a railway station (originally called Greenfield Station) of the Glasgow, Bothwell, Hamilton and Coatbridge Railway (later the London and North Eastern Railway's Hamilton Branch situated on Glasgow Road (today part of the A724). The station was opened 1 April 1878 as Greenfield, and was closed during the First World War on 1 January 1917. It was re-opened after the war on 2 June 1919 and finally closed on 15 September 1952. The track bed remained until the 1980s but has since been landscaped.

The line ran from the North British Railway's Hamilton Station to Shettleston and Whifflet and, although passenger and general freight services were provided, was primarily intended to take coal from Hamilton, Burnbank and Blantyre to the ironworks at Parkhead Forge and Coatbridge. Sir Robert McAlpine (see notable people below) was the principal builder throughout the line and designed the station and signal boxes at Burnbank.

Today, trains run through the area on the Argyle Line. The nearest railway station today is Hamilton West.

Trams were operated in Burnbank by the Hamilton, Motherwell and Wishaw Tramways Company in the late 19th and early 20th centuries.

A number of bus routes were operated by Chieftain Buses from their depot on High Blantyre Road, Burnbank. Following the takeover of Chieftain by Central SMT (itself a subsidiary of the London Midland and Scottish Railway) the depot continued in use until 1962. The routes served continued under Central SMT and its successors including the current operator First Glasgow (No.2) Ltd who have opened a new depot on the borders of Burnbank and Blantyre.

== Religion ==
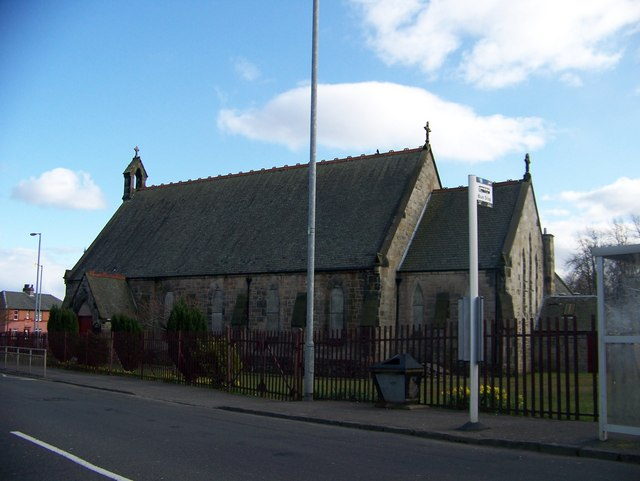
Burnbank Parish Church

Burnbank has historically been a predominantly (and is today at least nominally) a largely Christian area, with the main denominations represented being Church of Scotland which has two parishes in the area and Roman Catholic which has one. The Church of Scotland Gilmour and Whitehill parish is recognised by the Church as one of the most economically deprived in Scotland. This parish's Church, has a square tower which was supposed to have a spire on top this was not built however as the ground being undermined by the coal pits in the area it was feared that the weight would cause collapse both to the mine and to the tower itself.

The Church of Scotland's Burnbank parish also had its own Parish Church. It is situated on the junction at Udston Road and High Blantyre Road, and is now a Coptic Orthodox church under the dedication of St Michael and St Mary.

The Roman Catholic parish of St Cuthbert's was established in 1893, and was originally part of the Archdiocese of Glasgow before passing to the Diocese of Motherwell when that diocese was erected in 1947. The church building dated from 1908. According to the diocesan authorities it had a congregation of some 3,000 souls. In the decades after the second world war visiting Polish priests provided services to the Polish immigrant community. From 2011 until 2021, the parish was also home to the Syro-Malabar Catholic community. Their procession through the streets as part of the celebrations for the Feast of the Assumption took place annually. The parish was closed in October 2022 and came under the care of the nearby St Ninian's, Hillhouse. The church, hall and presbytery were demolished in late 2023.

== Community services ==
The former Victorian Police Station (dating from in 1894) was for many years divided between the Public Library and local authourity housing offices. It is now part of the Burnbank Centre complex and houses the local Library.

== Education ==
Burnbank is home to two present day primary schools - St Cuthbert's Catholic Primary and Glenlee Primary (which is non-denominational). In addition a Comprehensive Secondary School, St John Ogilvie High School, is located within Burnbank on Farm Road although it has a much broader catchment area which includes Blantyre.

A previous primary school, Dykehead Primary School at Udston, Burnbank, was closed in the 1930s following pit closures.

A previous non-denominational secondary - Greenfield School was located in the area until the mid-1970s when it became an annexe to John Ogilvie High School. This site has now been re-developed as housing.

== Amenities ==
Burnbank has a number of retail outlets including a small Co-operative grocery which is the remnant of a much larger department store that belonged to the Burnbank Co-operative Society. There is also a post-office, butchers, newsagents, bakery and a number of public houses. The last Bank to have a branch in the area was the Clydesdale- this was closed in the early years of the 21st century and the building is now one of a number of betting shops in the area.

Previously in addition to the Co-operative there was a large fancy goods store serving the community. At various times there have been florists, and haberdasheries in the area.

There was a cinema in Burnbank called the Plaza which later became a Bingo Hall before demolition.

The centre of Burnbank was re-developed in the mid-1970s with one half of the centre being pedestrianised.

The largest area of Burnbank is Udston, built on former colliery land, in the 1950s. It consists of a large number of streets, roads and crescents.

== Notable people ==
Sir Harry Lauder worked in various pits in the Hamilton area including Burnbank before launching his stage career.

Robert (Concrete Bob) McAlpine was the founder of the major British construction firm now known as Sir Robert McAlpine Ltd. His initial builder's business was based in Burnbank. In addition to the construction of the Glasgow Bothwell Hamilton and Coatbridge Railway which runs through Burnbank he later gained fame for the Mallaig Extension Railway famous for the concrete structures built along the line, the most notable of which is Glenfinnan Viaduct.

Jock Stein CBE was a football player with Albion Rovers FC, Llanelli Town FC and Celtic FC before becoming a legendary football manager who managed Dunfermline Athletic FC, Hibernian FC and Celtic FC. With the latter he twice reached the final of the European Cup, winning against Inter Milan in Lisbon in 1967 and losing against Feyenoord Rotterdam to a goal in the last three minutes of extra time at the San Siro in Milan was born in Burnbank. He twice managed the Scotland national team in 1965 and again between 1978 and 1985.

Jim Bett - was a football player with Airdrieonians FC, K.S.C. Lokeren Oost-Vlaanderen (twice), Glasgow Rangers FC, Aberdeen FC, Knattspyrnufélag Reykjavíkur, Heart of Midlothian FC and Dundee United FC. He gained 26 international caps for Scotland.

Willie Savage - footballing long time servant of Queen of the South F.C. in the club's days in Scotland's top division.

Walter McGowan MBE - 1960s World Flyweight Boxing Champion, was also born in Burnbank, and used the old Glenlee House as a training base.

The Reverend Scott J Brown CBE - Chaplain of the Fleet, Royal Navy. Both his parents, Margaret and Jim Brown, were born in Burnbank.

Garry Lee McCallum Founder of the history website Historic Hamilton was brought up in Burnbank. Historic Hamilton
