= Hamilton West, Hamilton, Scotland =

Coordinates: 55.7838°N 4.0533°W

Hamilton West: Scottish Gaelic: Hamaltan an Iar
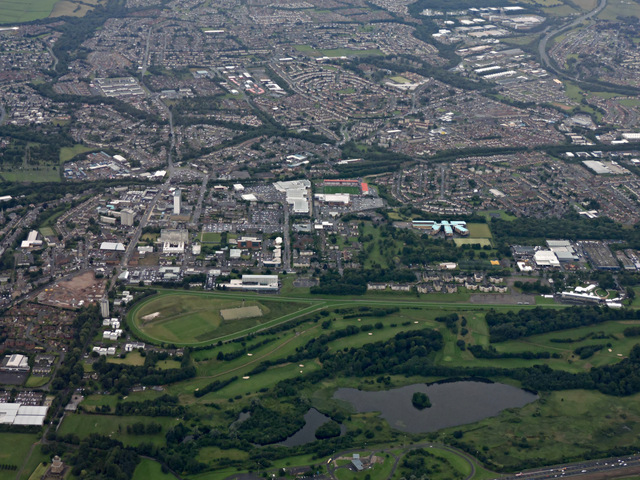
- 2018 aerial view of Hamilton West, including council headquarters, courthouse, racecourse, university, football stadium and retail park

- Location within South Lanarkshire
- Council area: South Lanarkshire
- Country: Scotland
- Sovereign state: United Kingdom
- Postcode district: ML3 0
- Dialling code: 01698
- Police: Scotland
- Fire: Scottish
- Ambulance: Scottish
- UK Parliament: Lanark and Hamilton East
- Scottish Parliament: Hamilton, Larkhall and Stonehouse

Hamilton West is an area of the town of Hamilton in South Lanarkshire, Scotland.

== Summary ==
About 10 minutes walk north west of Hamilton town centre, the area contains many of the more important institutions in the town, including: the South Lanarkshire county buildings, Hamilton Retail Park (including a Sainsbury's), Holy Cross High School, the private institution Hamilton College, a large Morrisons supermarket, Hamilton Park Racecourse, a Five-a-side football complex, New Douglas Park (home of Hamilton Academical F.C.), Hamilton Sheriff Court, Hamilton Water Palace (swimming pool), Hamilton West Parish Church, Peacock Cross, and many bars and restaurants and takeaways such as Equi's Ice Cream parlour dating from the 1920s (located beside the former home of David Livingstone).

The Hamilton campus of the University of the West of Scotland, previously the buildings of Bell College until 2007, were located in the area from 1972 until 2018 when The buildings remained in use as part of the UWS facilities until 2018, when a replacement at the Hamilton International Technology Park (actually situated outside the town, closer to Blantyre) was completed. By then, plans had been submitted for the intended redevelopment of the Almada Street site into a mix of office, retail and residential use and a park area, with the working name Hamilton Green urban village.

Since 2005, one of the local UK Parliamentary constituencies has been named Rutherglen and Hamilton West, however only a small part of the 'Hamilton West' area falls within its boundaries with the majority, including all the public amenities listed above, coming under the other constituency covering the town: Lanark and Hamilton East.

== Transport ==
Hamilton West railway station serves the area. Regular trains go to Hamilton Central, Motherwell, Larkhall and Glasgow.

The area is also well served by buses to other areas in Hamilton, as well as East Kilbride and Glasgow.
