= Bell College =

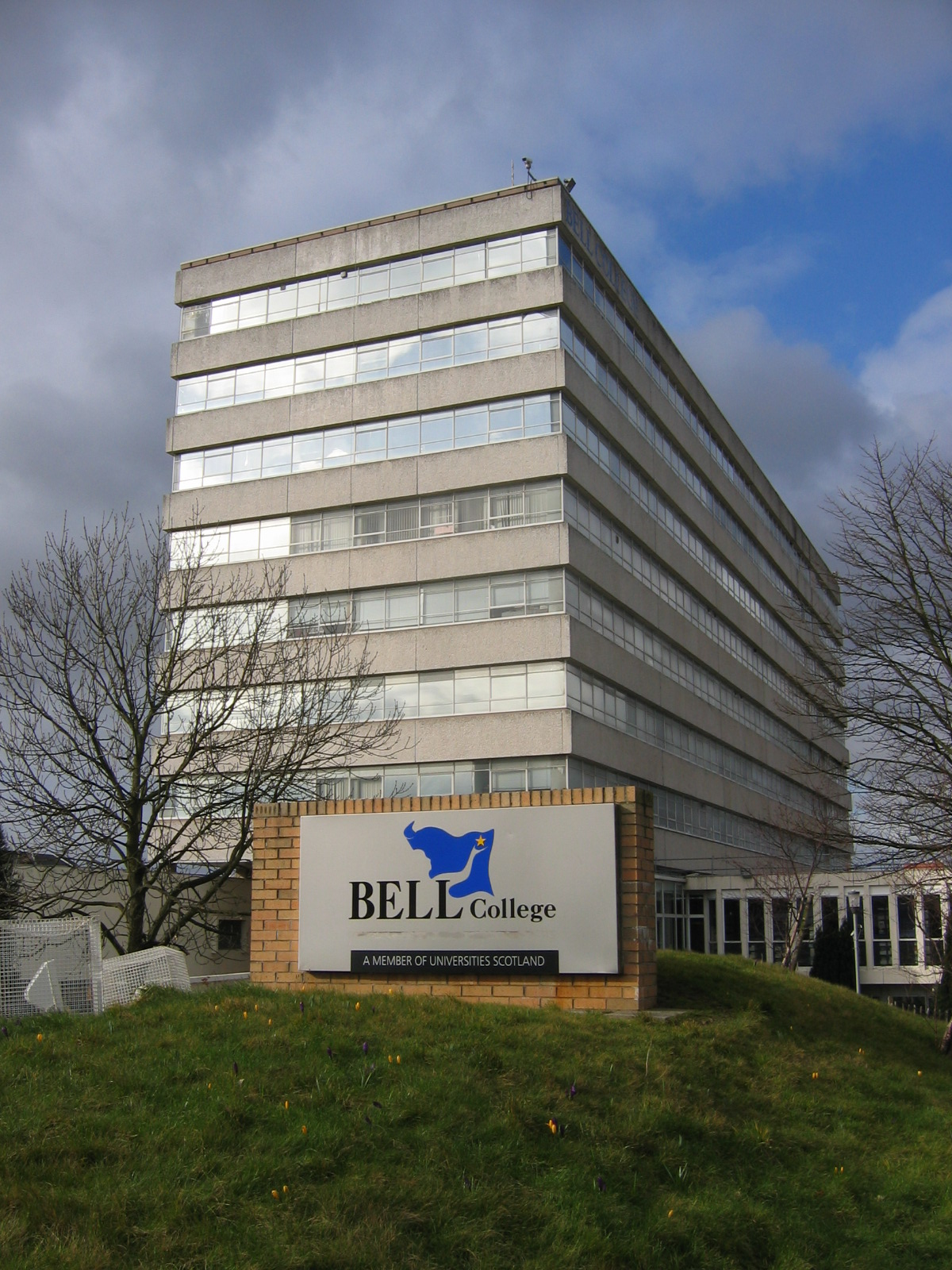
- Main building of Bell College, on Almada Street, Hamilton
- Active: 1972–2007 (due to renaming and merger)
- Location: Hamilton and Dumfries, Scotland
- Campus: Urban
- Website: http://www.uws.ac.uk

Bell College was a higher education college based in Hamilton and Dumfries in Scotland. Founded in 1972, the College merged with the University of Paisley on 1 August 2007, it is now part of the renamed University of the West of Scotland.

== History ==
The College was created in 1972, and was initially known as Bell College of Technology. The main campus was constructed on Almada Street, West Hamilton. A "Memorandum of Understanding" between the College and the University of Strathclyde was signed in 1993 to allow the College to offer degree-level courses. In 1995, the Lanarkshire and Dumfries & Galloway Colleges of Nursing & Midwifery were amalgamated into Bell College.

On 1 August 2007 Bell College merged with the University of Paisley to form the largest 'modern' (post-1992) Scottish University. The amalgamated body began life as the University of Paisley, but applied to be renamed as 'The University of the West of Scotland'. This change came into effect on 30 November 2007.

The buildings remained in use as part of the UWS facilities until 2018, when a new campus at the Hamilton International Technology Park (actually situated outside the town, closer to Blantyre) was completed. By then, plans had been submitted for the intended redevelopment of the Almada Street site into a mix of office, retail and residential use and a park area, with the working name Hamilton Green urban village.

== See also ==
- List of further and higher education colleges in Scotland
