= List of listed buildings in Hamilton, South Lanarkshire =

This is a list of listed buildings in the parish of Hamilton in South Lanarkshire, Scotland.

== List ==
Name	Location	Date Listed	Grid Ref. (Note: Sometimes known as OSGB36, the grid reference (where provided) is based on the British national grid reference system used by the Ordnance Survey. • "Guide to National Grid". Ordnance Survey. • "Get-a-map". Ordnance Survey.)	Geo-coordinates	Notes	LB Number (Note: Historic Environment Scotland assign a unique alphanumeric identifier to each designated site in Scotland, for listed buildings this always begins with "LB", for example "LB12345".)	Image
2, 4, 6 Cadzow Street And 3, 5 Castle Street				55°46′35″N 4°02′01″W	Category B	34551	Upload Photo
40, 42 Castle Street				55°46′37″N 4°02′00″W	Category B	34554	Upload Photo
371 Glasgow Road, Limetree, Including Boundary Wall				55°47′07″N 4°04′38″W	Category C(S)	34557	Upload Photo
4 And 6 Keith Street				55°46′33″N 4°01′59″W	Category C(S)	34560	Upload Photo
85-89 (Odd Nos) Quarry Street				55°46′29″N 4°02′08″W	Category C(S)	34572	Upload Photo
117-121 (Odd Nos) Quarry Street And 2-8 (Even Nos) Duke Street, Royal Hotel				55°46′26″N 4°02′12″W	Category B	34574	Upload Photo
123-127 (Odd Nos) Quarry Street				55°46′26″N 4°02′13″W	Category C(S)	34575	Upload Photo
185 Quarry Street				55°46′19″N 4°02′18″W	Category C(S)	34583	Upload Photo
74-78 (Even Nos) Quarry Street				55°46′31″N 4°02′07″W	Category C(S)	34589	Upload Photo
102-106 (Even Nos) Quarry Street				55°46′29″N 4°02′10″W	Category C(S)	34592	Upload Photo
29-41 (Odd Nos) Townhead Street, Hamilton Town Hotel				55°46′32″N 4°01′58″W	Category C(S)	34603	Upload Photo
Churchyard Ann Street				55°46′35″N 4°02′12″W	Category A	34474	Upload another image
4-24 (Even Nos) Gateside Street And 175-177 (Odd Nos) Quarry Street				55°46′20″N 4°02′17″W	Category B	34517	Upload Photo
Union Street, Auchingramont Church				55°46′32″N 4°02′45″W	Category B	34529	Upload another image
4 Auchingramont Road, Strathclyde Regional Council Education Resource Centre, Including Gatepiers				55°46′39″N 4°02′24″W	Category B	34537	Upload Photo
Chatelherault Hunting Lodge, Ornamental Gardens Boundary And Courtyard Walls And Leopard House				55°45′44″N 4°00′55″W	Category A	12485	Upload another image See more images
Toll House (No. 50 Carlisle Road)				55°46′09″N 4°01′03″W	Category B	12517	Upload Photo
Hamilton Monument (1863)				55°45′58″N 4°01′39″W	Category A	12520	Upload another image
21-31 (Odd Nos) Quarry Street, Victoria Buildings				55°46′32″N 4°02′02″W	Category B	44550	Upload Photo
14-18 (Inclusive Nos) Kemp Street				55°46′22″N 4°02′23″W	Category C(S)	34565	Upload Photo
41-49 (Odd Nos) Quarry Street				55°46′31″N 4°02′05″W	Category C(S)	34569	Upload Photo
67-75 (Odd Nos) Quarry Street				55°46′29″N 4°02′07″W	Category C(S)	34571	Upload Photo
167 And 169 Quarry Street And 3 Avon Street				55°46′21″N 4°02′14″W	Category C(S)	34580	Upload Photo
183 Quarry Street				55°46′20″N 4°02′17″W	Category C(S)	34582	Upload Photo
38-46 (Even Nos) Quarry Street				55°46′32″N 4°02′05″W	Category B	34585	Upload Photo
58-64 (Even Nos) Quarry Street				55°46′31″N 4°02′06″W	Category C(S)	34587	Upload Photo
172-176 (Even Nos) Quarry Street				55°46′21″N 4°02′16″W	Category B	34596	Upload Photo
29 Wellhall Road, Flakedale, Including Boundary Wall				55°46′32″N 4°03′34″W	Category C(S)	34608	Upload Photo
Auchencampbell Road, Hamilton Grammar School				55°46′27″N 4°02′47″W	Category B	34475	Upload Photo
Auchingramont Road, St. Mary's Episcopal Church				55°46′38″N 4°02′27″W	Category B	34482	Upload Photo
Bothwell Road, 65 Lodge And Gatepiers At Hamilton Public Park				55°47′09″N 4°03′01″W	Category C(S)	34485	Upload another image
Bothwell Road, Railings At Hamilton College Of Education				55°46′58″N 4°02′48″W	Category B	34488	Upload Photo
Cadzow Street, 78, 80, 82, 84 And Corner Of Church Street				55°46′37″N 4°02′12″W	Category B	34501	Upload Photo
Cadzow Street, 114				55°46′41″N 4°02′24″W	Category B	34508	Upload Photo
Cadzow Street, St Mary's Roman Catholic Church				55°46′42″N 4°02′27″W	Category B	34511	Upload Photo
4, 6, 8, 10, 14, 16 Muir Street				55°46′45″N 4°02′38″W	Category B	34524	Upload Photo
26, 28, 30, 32 Muir Street				55°46′44″N 4°02′36″W	Category B	34525	Upload Photo
Windmill Road, 12				55°46′41″N 4°02′39″W	Category C(S)	34535	Upload Photo
66 Brandon Street, Hamilton District Council Offices And Boundary Walls				55°46′27″N 4°02′23″W	Category B	34536	Upload Photo
14-18 (Even Nos) Brandon Street, Brandon Chambers				55°46′27″N 4°02′14″W	Category B	34541	Upload Photo
Old Avon Bridge				55°46′06″N 4°01′15″W	Category A	12518	Upload another image
Barncluith House				55°46′02″N 4°01′34″W	Category B	12481	Upload Photo
Keith Street, Salvation Army Citadel, Including Boundary Wall And Railings				55°46′34″N 4°01′56″W	Category C(S)	34558	Upload Photo
Kemp Street, Former Caledonian Railway Booking Office				55°46′23″N 4°02′19″W	Category C(S)	34563	Upload Photo
Mill Road, Hamilton South Church, Including Boundary Railings				55°45′37″N 4°02′48″W	Category C(S)	34566	Upload Photo
48-56 (Even Nos) Quarry Street				55°46′32″N 4°02′05″W	Category B	34586	Upload Photo
57 Union Street, Including Coach House/Stable, Boundary And Terrace Walls				55°46′34″N 4°03′02″W	Category B	34606	Upload Photo
Almada Street 63 Currie House				55°46′44″N 4°02′51″W	Category B	34471	Upload Photo
Parish Church Ann Street				55°46′34″N 4°02′13″W	Category A	34473	Upload another image
Auchingramont Road, 31				55°46′32″N 4°02′47″W	Category C(S)	34481	Upload Photo
Burnbank Road, 57				55°46′43″N 4°03′31″W	Category C(S)	34492	Upload Photo
Cadzow Street, 111,113 And 1 Auchingramont Road, Bank Of Scotland				55°46′39″N 4°02′21″W	Category B	34498	Upload Photo
Cadzow Street 26-42 (Even Nos) And Corner Of Campbell Street				55°46′36″N 4°02′05″W	Category B	34500	Upload Photo
Cadzow Bridge Cadzow Street				55°46′37″N 4°02′15″W	Category A	34504	Upload another image
Cadzow Street, 98-102 Municipal Buildings				55°46′40″N 4°02′19″W	Category B	34505	Upload another image
Carlisle Road, 9 Angus Hotel				55°46′21″N 4°01′38″W	Category C(S)	34513	Upload Photo
Church Street, 5				55°46′37″N 4°02′11″W	Category B	34515	Upload Photo
56 Muir Street				55°46′43″N 4°02′23″W	Category B	34526	Upload Photo
Union Street, Waugh's Premises, Corner Of Auchinampbell Road				55°46′27″N 4°02′40″W	Category B	34531	Upload Photo
76 Burnbank Centre, Burnbank Library, Including Rear Enclosing Wall				55°46′54″N 4°04′04″W	Category B	34545	Upload Photo
Cadzow Castle				55°45′38″N 4°01′04″W	Category B	12483	Upload Photo
51 Neilsland Road, Burnhouse, With Boundary Wall				55°45′54″N 4°03′29″W	Category C(S)	50117	Upload Photo
56 Woodfoot Road, Earnock Cottage				55°46′06″N 4°04′06″W	Category B	50118	Upload Photo
Ferniegair, Carlisle Road, Ferniegair Mission Church (Church Of Scotland)				55°45′57″N 4°00′28″W	Category C(S)	50166	Upload Photo
33 Quarry Street And 2 Regent Way				55°46′31″N 4°02′04″W	Category C(S)	44551	Upload Photo
1, 3, 5 Gateside Street And 2, 4 Avon Street				55°46′20″N 4°02′14″W	Category C(S)	34555	Upload Photo
Kemp Street And Graham Street, Hamilton Baptist Church, Including Adjoining Church Hall And Offices, Boundary Wall, Gatepiers And Railings				55°46′20″N 4°02′25″W	Category C(S)	34562	Upload Photo
3-10 (Inclusive Nos) Kemp Street				55°46′22″N 4°02′17″W	Category B	34564	Upload Photo
Quarry Street, Former Entrance To Railway Station, Including Adjoining Wall				55°46′23″N 4°02′15″W	Category C(S)	34567	Upload Photo
35-39 (Odd Nos) Quarry Street				55°46′31″N 4°02′04″W	Category C(S)	34568	Upload Photo
57-65 (Odd Nos) Quarry Street				55°46′30″N 4°02′06″W	Category C(S)	34570	Upload Photo
129-135 (Odd Nos) Quarry Street				55°46′25″N 4°02′13″W	Category C(S)	34576	Upload Photo
30-36 (Even Nos) Quarry Street				55°46′32″N 4°02′04″W	Category B	34584	Upload Photo
186 And 188 Quarry Street				55°46′21″N 4°02′18″W	Category C(S)	34598	Upload Photo
Auchingramont Road, 19, The Orchard				55°46′34″N 4°02′39″W	Category B	34478	Upload Photo
Auchingramont Road, 4A Hall To St Mary's Church				55°46′39″N 4°02′28″W	Category C(S)	34483	Upload Photo
Bothwell Road, Bandstand At Hamilton Public Park				55°47′07″N 4°03′09″W	Category C(S)	34486	Upload Photo
Cadzow Street, 105 Royal Bank Of Scotland				55°46′38″N 4°02′19″W	Category B	34497	Upload Photo
Cadzow Street, 86, 88				55°46′37″N 4°02′12″W	Category B	34502	Upload Photo
Cadzow Street, 108, 110, 112				55°46′41″N 4°02′24″W	Category B	34507	Upload Photo
St John's Church. Duke Street				55°46′25″N 4°02′10″W	Category B	34516	Upload Photo
Keith Street, Vogue Social Club				55°46′35″N 4°01′58″W	Category B	34520	Upload Photo
Riding School Off Muir Street				55°46′47″N 4°02′07″W	Category A	34522	Upload Photo
72 Muir Street				55°46′43″N 4°02′16″W	Category B	34527	Upload Photo
24 Brandon Street, Post Office				55°46′27″N 4°02′16″W	Category B	34543	Upload Photo
Burnbank Centre, Gilmour Memorial Church, Including Gatepiers				55°46′55″N 4°04′07″W	Category C(S)	34544	Upload Photo
17 Burnbank Road, Ulva Cottage				55°46′41″N 4°03′19″W	Category C(S)	34548	Upload Photo
Quarter Church				55°44′13″N 4°02′13″W	Category B	13821	Upload Photo
Ross House				55°46′44″N 4°00′41″W	Category B	12486	Upload Photo
Fairholm				55°44′27″N 3°59′10″W	Category B	12487	Upload Photo
Barncluith				55°46′02″N 4°01′32″W	Category B	12521	Upload Photo
Bothwell Road, Gatepiers To Sewage Works				55°47′42″N 4°03′23″W	Category B	50181	Upload another image
120 Cadzow Street, St Mary's Presbytery And Hall				55°46′43″N 4°02′27″W	Category C(S)	34553	Upload Photo
1-9 (Odd Nos) Keith Street, Douglas Chambers				55°46′35″N 4°01′59″W	Category B	34559	Upload Photo
179 And 181 Quarry Street				55°46′20″N 4°02′17″W	Category C(S)	34581	Upload Photo
66-72 (Even Nos) Quarry Street				55°46′31″N 4°02′07″W	Category C(S)	34588	Upload Photo
118-122 (Even Nos) Quarry Street				55°46′28″N 4°02′11″W	Category B	34593	Upload Photo
15-27 (Odd Nos) Townhead Street				55°46′33″N 4°01′59″W	Category B	34602	Upload Photo
51 Union Street, Linnburn, Including Gatepiers And Boundary Wall				55°46′32″N 4°02′53″W	Category B	34605	Upload Photo
Woodside Walk, Cadzow Parish Church, Including Gatepiers, Gates, Boundary Walls And Railings				55°46′18″N 4°02′13″W	Category B	34610	Upload Photo
Auchingramont Road 29				55°46′33″N 4°02′46″W	Category B	34480	Upload Photo
Bothwell Road, Lodge To Hamilton College Of Education				55°46′48″N 4°02′39″W	Category B	34487	Upload another image
Burnbank Road, 53				55°46′43″N 4°03′29″W	Category B	34490	Upload Photo
Cadzow Street, 118A Old Chapel House				55°46′42″N 4°02′26″W	Category C(S)	34510	Upload Photo
Townhead Street, 89 Staneacre House				55°46′28″N 4°01′52″W	Category B	34528	Upload Photo
Chatelherault Country Park, Laigh Quarter, Laigh Quarter Bridge Over Burn				55°44′40″N 4°00′15″W	Category C(S)	13623	Upload Photo
Quarter Manse				55°44′12″N 4°02′16″W	Category B	12489	Upload Photo
115 Cadzow Street, Hamilton District Council Computer Department (Formerly British Linen Bank)				55°46′39″N 4°02′23″W	Category C(S)	34549	Upload Photo
129 Cadzow Street				55°46′41″N 4°02′30″W	Category C(S)	34550	Upload Photo
7-17 (Odd Nos) Gateside Street				55°46′20″N 4°02′14″W	Category C(S)	34556	Upload Photo
91-99 (Odd Nos) Quarry Street				55°46′28″N 4°02′09″W	Category C(S)	34573	Upload Photo
88-94 (Even Nos) Quarry Street				55°46′30″N 4°02′09″W	Category C(S)	34590	Upload Photo
96-100 (Even Nos) Quarry Street				55°46′29″N 4°02′10″W	Category C(S)	34591	Upload Photo
178-184 (Even Nos) Quarry Street				55°46′21″N 4°02′17″W	Category C(S)	34597	Upload Photo
Saffronhall Lane, Hamilton North Church, Including Gatepiers, Boundary Wall And Railings				55°46′42″N 4°02′37″W	Category C(S)	34600	Upload Photo
Udston Road, Burnbank Parish Church And Hall				55°46′52″N 4°04′28″W	Category C(S)	34604	Upload another image
68 Wellhall Road, Cemetery Lodge, Including Gatepiers, Gates, Adjoining Walls And Waiting Room				55°46′19″N 4°03′12″W	Category C(S)	34609	Upload Photo
Sheriff Court Buildings, Almada Street				55°46′46″N 4°02′56″W	Category A	34470	Upload another image
Auchingramont Road, 7 And Glen Cottage Adjoining				55°46′36″N 4°02′28″W	Category C(S)	34477	Upload Photo
Avon Street, St Andrews Parish Church				55°46′20″N 4°02′10″W	Category B	34484	Upload Photo
Burnbank Road, 59, Herbertfield				55°46′43″N 4°03′33″W	Category C(S)	34493	Upload Photo
Burnbank Road 61				55°46′44″N 4°03′34″W	Category C(S)	34494	Upload Photo
Burnbank Road, West Church Of Scotland, Including Church House, 40 Burnbank Road				55°46′43″N 4°03′20″W	Category B	34496	Upload Photo
Cadzow Street, 104, 106 Masonic Buildings, And Corner Of Lower Auchingramont Road				55°46′41″N 4°02′23″W	Category B	34506	Upload Photo
Cadzow Street, 116				55°46′41″N 4°02′25″W	Category B	34509	Upload Photo
Hamilton Mausoleum				55°47′00″N 4°01′54″W	Category A	34518	Upload Photo
14 Beckford Street, Lanarkshire Health Board Offices, Including Gatepiers And Lampstandards				55°46′48″N 4°02′58″W	Category B	34538	Upload Photo
Bent Road, Bent Cemetery, Monument To Dukes Of Hamilton				55°46′22″N 4°03′14″W	Category C(S)	34539	Upload Photo
1, 3 Burnbank Road And 2, 4 Wellhall Road, Harveys Bar				55°46′40″N 4°03′14″W	Category C(S)	34546	Upload Photo
5, 7 Burnbank Road				55°46′40″N 4°03′16″W	Category C(S)	34547	Upload Photo
Chatelherault Country Park, Bridge Over Burn, Darling Bridge				55°45′43″N 4°01′30″W	Category B	13622	Upload Photo
Fairholm Bridge				55°44′41″N 3°59′22″W	Category B	12488	Upload Photo
Avon Bridge				55°46′11″N 4°01′04″W	Category A	12516	Upload another image
5 Blackswell Lane				55°46′30″N 4°01′53″W	Category B	47366	Upload Photo
8 Keith Street And 1 Bourne Street				55°46′34″N 4°01′58″W	Category C(S)	34561	Upload Photo
143 And 145 Quarry Street And 2-6 (Even Nos) John Street				55°46′23″N 4°02′14″W	Category C(S)	34577	Upload Photo
147-155 (Odd Nos) Quarry Street				55°46′22″N 4°02′14″W	Category C(S)	34578	Upload Photo
157-165 (Odd Nos) Quarry Street				55°46′22″N 4°02′14″W	Category C(S)	34579	Upload Photo
Almada Street, Lanark County Buildings				55°46′45″N 4°03′03″W	Category A	34472	Upload another image
Auchingramont Road, 21				55°46′34″N 4°02′41″W	Category C(S)	34479	Upload Photo
Burnbank Road, 63 Dunrod				55°46′44″N 4°03′37″W	Category B	34495	Upload Photo
Cadzow Street, 8, 10, 12, 14, 16, 18, 20, 22, 24				55°46′35″N 4°02′02″W	Category B	34499	Upload Photo
Cadzow Street, 92, 94				55°46′38″N 4°02′13″W	Category A	34503	Upload another image
Carlisle Road, 4 The Priory				55°46′19″N 4°01′40″W	Category C(S)	34514	Upload Photo
Hamilton Mausoleum, Keeper's House/Lodge				55°47′03″N 4°01′55″W	Category B	34519	Upload another image
Hamilton Burgh Museum Muir Street				55°46′46″N 4°02′07″W	Category A	34521	Upload another image See more images
Premises Of L.S. Smellie & Sons, Auction Mart. Muir Street				55°46′42″N 4°02′22″W	Category B	34523	Upload Photo
Union Street, Auchingramont Church Manse				55°46′31″N 4°02′43″W	Category B	34530	Upload Photo
Windmill Road, 19, 21				55°46′40″N 4°02′38″W	Category C(S)	34533	Upload Photo
Windmill Road, 10				55°46′41″N 4°02′38″W	Category C(S)	34534	Upload Photo
20-22 (Even Nos) Brandon Street, Post Office				55°46′27″N 4°02′15″W	Category B	34542	Upload Photo
Cadzow Chapel				55°45′38″N 4°01′06″W	Category B	12484	Upload Photo
Terraces And Summerhouse, Barncluith				55°46′01″N 4°01′33″W	Category A	12522	Upload Photo
118 Cadzow Street, Muirbrow Chambers				55°46′41″N 4°02′26″W	Category C(S)	34552	Upload Photo
164 Quarry Street And 1 And 2 Kemp Street				55°46′22″N 4°02′16″W	Category B	34594	Upload Photo
166-170 (Even Nos) Quarry Street				55°46′22″N 4°02′16″W	Category B	34595	Upload Photo
6 And 8 Saffronhall Crescent, Public Baths				55°46′43″N 4°02′48″W	Category B	34599	Upload Photo
20 Strathmore Road, Old Parish Church Halls, Including Gatepiers, Gates And Railings				55°46′33″N 4°02′16″W	Category B	34601	Upload Photo
59 Union Street, Cadzowburn, Including Boundary Wall				55°46′34″N 4°03′04″W	Category C(S)	34607	Upload Photo
Auchencampbell Road, House At Hamilton Grammar School (45 Union Street)				55°46′27″N 4°02′42″W	Category C(S)	34476	Upload Photo
Brandon Street, Brandon Tower				55°46′27″N 4°02′13″W	Category B	34489	Upload Photo
Burnbank Road, 55				55°46′43″N 4°03′30″W	Category C(S)	34491	Upload Photo
Cadzow Street/Muir Street Watson Fountain				55°46′44″N 4°02′32″W	Category C(S)	34512	Upload another image
Bent Road, Bent Cemetery, Monument To Robert Brown				55°46′22″N 4°03′14″W	Category B	34540	Upload another image
Bridge, Chatelherault				55°45′40″N 4°01′01″W	Category B	12482	Upload Photo
Avon Railway Viaduct And Tunnel Approach				55°46′03″N 4°01′25″W	Category B	12519	Upload Photo

== Key ==
The scheme for classifying buildings in Scotland is:

- Category A: "buildings of national or international importance, either architectural or historic; or fine, little-altered examples of some particular period, style or building type."
- Category B: "buildings of regional or more than local importance; or major examples of some particular period, style or building type, which may have been altered."
- Category C: "buildings of local importance; lesser examples of any period, style, or building type, as originally constructed or moderately altered; and simple traditional buildings which group well with other listed buildings."

In March 2016 there were 47,288 listed buildings in Scotland. Of these, 8% were Category A, and 50% were Category B, with the remaining 42% being Category C.
