= Cliftonhill =

Football stadium in Coatbridge, Scotland

The Reigart Stadium
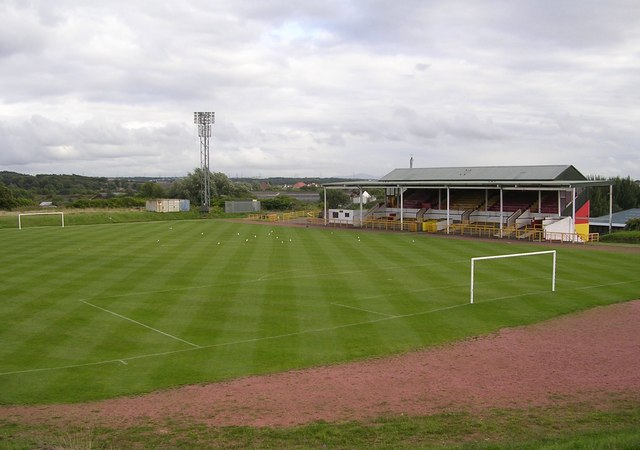

- Location in North Lanarkshire
- Location: Coatbridge, Scotland
- Coordinates: 55°51′37″N 4°00′41″W
- Owner: Albion Rovers F.C.
- Capacity: 1572 (489 seated)
- Surface: Grass
- Field size: 110 yd × 72 yd (101 m × 66 m)

Construction
- Opened: 1919

Tenants
- Albion Rovers F.C. (1919 – Present); Coatbridge Monarchs (1968 – 1969); Coatbridge Tigers (1973 – 1977); Hamilton Academical F.C. (1997 – 1999); Dumbarton F.C. (2001)

Cliftonhill Stadium, commonly known as Cliftonhill and currently 'The Reigart Stadium' for sponsorship purposes, is a football stadium in Coatbridge, North Lanarkshire, Scotland. It is the home ground of former Scottish Professional Football League team Albion Rovers F.C., who have played at the ground since 1919.

== History ==
Rovers moved from Meadow Park to Cliftonhill in 1919, with the new ground opening on 25 December. The Main Stand sits high on a rise above Main Street and was built in the same season as their only Scottish Cup Final appearance. A roof extension over the paddock (a standing area in front of the stand) was added in 1994. Cliftonhill's record attendance was set on 8 February 1936 when 27,381 watched the visit of Rangers. Floodlighting was installed at the ground in October 1968.

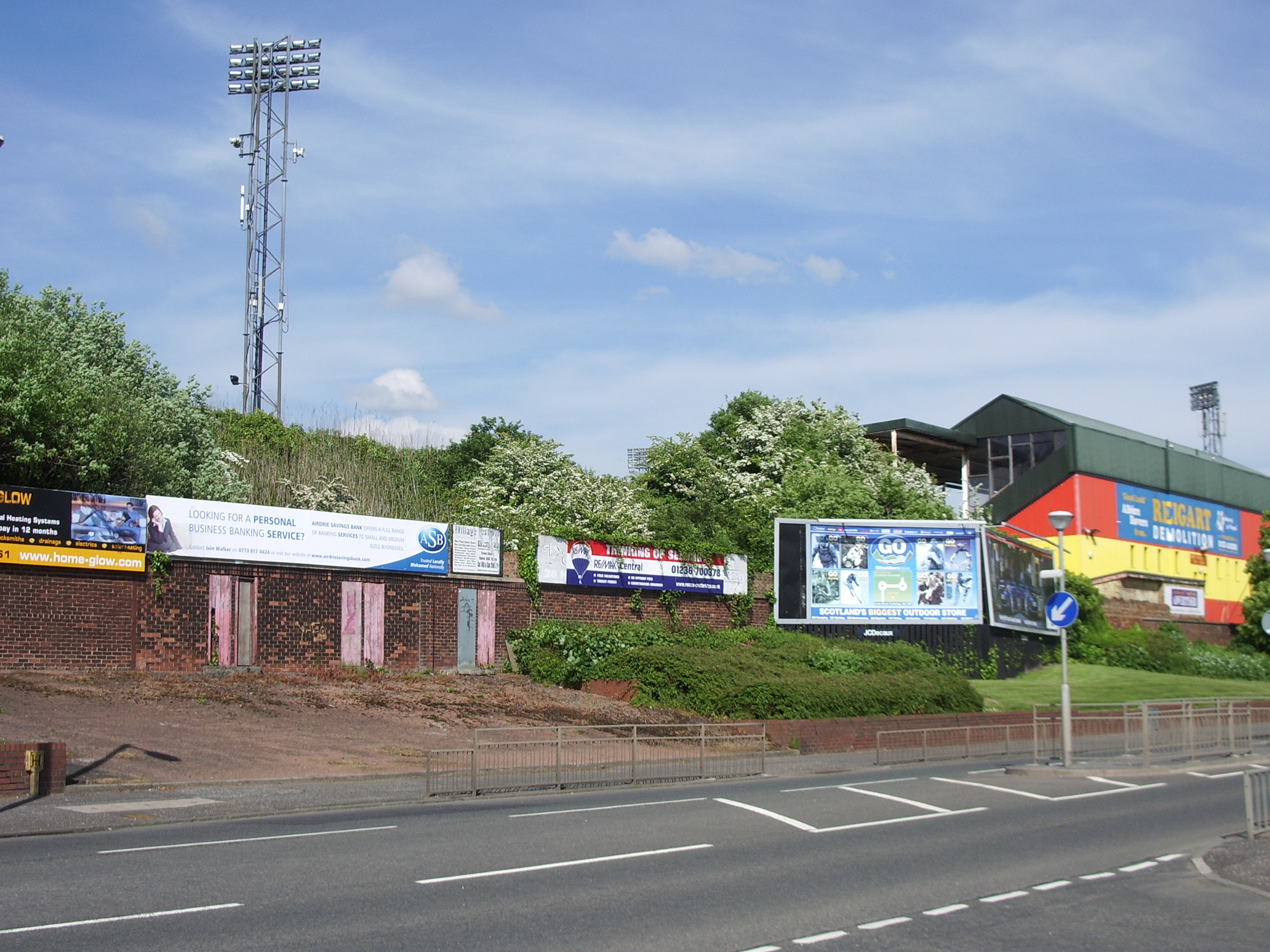
The outside of the stadium

During the 1990s it looked likely that Albion Rovers would leave Cliftonhill to share a stadium with local rivals Airdrieonians. However, opposition from Rovers fans, the local population and others, saw that move fall through. The club considered other options to sell the ground and build a new stadium elsewhere in the town, but these were not taken forward for a variety of reasons, including an unsympathetic local authority, and the club currently has no plans to leave Cliftonhill. The original floodlighting system came from Cardiff Arms Park, when it was demolished to make way for the Millennium Stadium. In 2006 the front entrance and main stand featured in a UK television advert for Flash. Currently, it contains a club shop which opens one hour prior to home first team matches.

In 2007, Cliftonhill was subject to repeated vandalism.

At the start of the 2016–17 season, Rovers announced a deal with local IT and communications firm Exsel Group that would see the stadium re-branded as the 'Exsel Group Stadium' for at least one season.

== Structure and facilities ==
The Main Stand and paddock, and a terracing behind the goal of the 'Airdrie End' of the ground (the latter installed in 2015), are the only parts of the stadium normally available for spectators. The sizeable, partly covered terrace on the opposite side of the main stand is currently closed to all fans. The capacity of the stadium rose to 1,572 when the Airdrie End terracing was installed.

The dimensions of the pitch are 110 by 72 yards (101 m × 66 m).

== Other uses ==
In addition to football, Cliftonhill has in the past staged speedway, greyhound racing and stock car racing.

=== Speedway ===
The stadium, which had been identified as a potential venue in the 1950s, became the home of Edinburgh Monarchs speedway team in 1968. The renamed Coatbridge Monarchs raced in 1969 but closed when the track licence was sold to Wembley Lions. The stadium hosted Glasgow Tigers from 1973 to mid season 1977 when the promotion moved to Blantyre Greyhound Stadium. The move was prompted by a desire to replace the speedway track with a greyhound track.

The original speedway track was unusual as the bends were laid out on the terracing at either end giving the track extremely banked bends.

=== Greyhound racing ===
Cliftonhill was first used for greyhound racing on 11 December 1931. The racing was independent (unlicensed) and a greyhound called Song of Love was the first ever winner over 380 yards. The track closed in the mid-fifties before opening again twenty years later during September 1977. The new circumference was 400 metres and race distances were 300, 500 and 700 yards, the main race was the Coatbridge Derby. Greyhound racing ceased for good during 1988.

== See also ==
- Stadium relocations in Scottish football
