= John Lamb Murray =

Scottish architect

John Lamb Murray (1838–1908) was a Scottish architect active in the nineteenth century.

Murray was born near Biggar, South Lanarkshire to a family of the minor landed gentleman. He owned the estates of Heavyside and Stains. He originally trained as a landsurveyor, working for several larger landowners in the area. However he became a self-taught architect and as civil and mechanical engineer, developing specific skills water power and electric lighting. he also had a strong interest in music, buildings a large pipe organ. This was originally installed in his workshop at Heavyside but after he had water power in his house, he re-installed it there.

Murray was the architect of Hartwood Hospital, after the Lanarkshire Lunacy Board set aside the results of a competition to select an architect. The ensuing work kept Murray's business very active until 1895.

In 1896 Murray became a pioneer motorist. He bought a Panhard Levassor and invested in Albion Motors which was established by his son Thomas Blackwood Murray and Norman Fulton.
