= Hamilton Townhouse =

Municipal building in Hamilton, Scotland

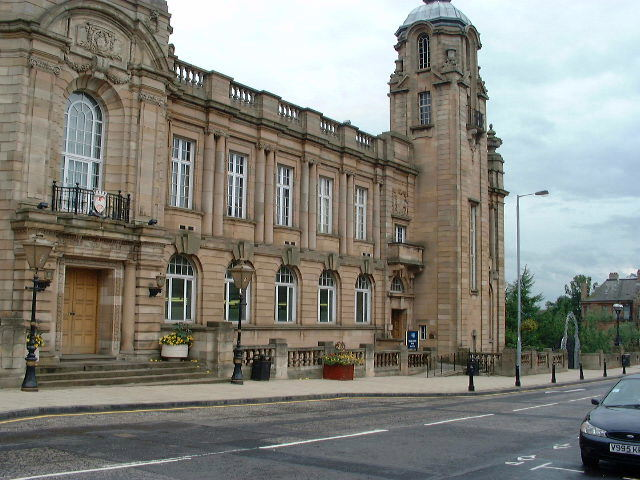
- The building prior to the 2002 renovation

- Shown in South Lanarkshire
- 55.77765°N 4.03851°W
- Location: Hamilton

History
- Built: 1928

Site notes
- Architect: Cullen, Lochhead and Brown
- Architectural style: Baroque style

Listed Building – Category B
- Designated: 21 October 1977
- Reference no.: LB34505

Hamilton Townhouse is a building in Cadzow Street in Hamilton, South Lanarkshire, Scotland, which is operated by South Lanarkshire Council. It contains both the town's main public hall (formerly known as Hamilton Town Hall) and public library, as well as various council departments including licensing and community learning. It is a Category B listed building.

== History ==
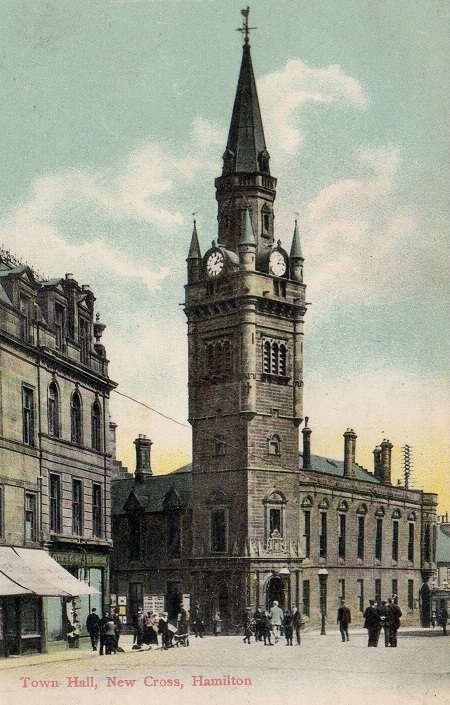
The old Town Hall at New Cross

The first town house in Hamilton, which contained the council chamber, the courthouse and the jail, was built adjoining the old tolbooth at the junction of Castle Street and Palace Grounds Road and was completed in 1798. (Note: The old town house was demolished in 1954, when a scroll was found recording its date of construction.) The council considered making alterations to the ageing tolbooth and town house complex in 1860, but in the event decided to augment their facilities with a new public hall, known as the "town hall" at New Cross (now the corner of Duke Street and Quarry Street) in 1861. (Note: The town hall was demolished in 1963 to make way for a department store.)

After the condition of the town hall at New Cross also deteriorated, civic leaders decided to procure a purpose-built complex which combined the functions of council chamber and public hall in one place: the site they selected was open land at the corner of Cadzow Street and Lower Auchingramomt Road.

The new building, although appearing to be one, was actually built in stages over a 21-year period. The library section of the complex was designed by Alexander Cullen (1856–1911) and opened by Andrew Carnegie in 1907. The adjacent townhouse offices were designed by Cullen Lochhead and Brown and officially opened by King George V on 9 July 1914. The town hall was also designed by Cullen Lochhead and Brown and completed in 1928.

The design involved a symmetrical frontage with seventeen bays facing Cadzow Street with the end bays, each with domed octagonal towers, projecting forward; the central section featured a wide doorway flanked by Doric order columns and pilasters on the ground floor; there was a wrought-iron balcony and a tall round-headed window flanked by Ionic order pilasters on the first floor with a segmental pediment above containing a carved coat of arms. Internally, the principal room was the main public hall with seating capacity for 700 people.

The townhouse was the seat of local government for the burgh of Hamilton and the successor district of same name while the Lanark County Buildings nearby in Almada Street served the wider Lanarkshire County, followed by the Lanark sub-region under Strathclyde following a reorganisation of administrative structures across the country in 1975. In 1996, new single-level council areas of Scotland were created to provide services previously controlled by regions and districts, and it was the County Buildings that became the headquarters for the new local body, South Lanarkshire Council.

In 2002, each section of the townhouse was closed to enable the building to undergo a regeneration project, costing £9 million, to proceed. This was required to bring the internal facilities to current standards and restore the crumbling stone exterior of the building. The restored facility was made available to the public in August 2004 and an official opening by Princess Anne took place in September 2004. The library has won two awards: the "Architect Meets Practicality Award" for libraries of significant architectural interest that are practical and user-friendly and the "Mary Finch Accessibility Award" for the library which most addresses access issues from physical through to cultural barriers. The restoration was also recognised with a Scottish Civic Trust commendation.

== See also ==
- List of listed buildings in Hamilton, South Lanarkshire
