= Blantyre Greyhound Stadium =

Former Greyhound racing and motorcycle speedway venue

- Location: Blantyre, South Lanarkshire, near Glasgow
- Coordinates: 55°47′28″N 4°04′44″W
- Opened: 1933
- Closed: 1982

Blantyre Greyhound Stadium also known as Craighead Park was a greyhound racing and speedway stadium in Blantyre, South Lanarkshire, near Glasgow.

The track opened on 6 October 1933 as an independent (unlicensed) track and was popular with the miners from the pit well and Whistleberry colliery. The track was owned by Frank Doonin.

The stadium hosted the Glasgow Tigers from 1977 to 1981.

It closed on 22 April 1982 and the site was redeveloped to incorporate the new A725 road (linking the town to the M74 motorway).
