= Whitehill, Hamilton, Scotland =

Residential area in Hamilton, Scotland

Coordinates: 55°47′24″N 4°04′01″W

Whitehill
- Location within South Lanarkshire
- Council area: South Lanarkshire
- Country: Scotland
- Sovereign state: United Kingdom
- Police: Scotland
- Fire: Scottish
- Ambulance: Scottish

Whitehill was originally a council-built district of Hamilton, Scotland, though now it is a mix between council and privately owned houses. It is situated in the northern area of Hamilton and is bounded by Blantyre to the west and Burnbank to the south. Whitehill contains two primary schools - Beckford Primary School and St Paul's Primary School.

== History ==
Although the official date of Whitehills beginnings is unclear most of the houses built there are semi-detached stone and brick council houses built around the 1920s and 1930s. Some of the other housing are timber houses built in the 1940s with Norwegian timber donated after the Second World War. Whitehill has always been a very working class area with a diverse group of people living there with people of Irish, Italian, Pakistani, Indian and Polish nationality or origin making up a lot of its residents.

== Modernization and improvement ==
Whitehill has changed a lot since 2004. Both the local park, library and sports barn were pulled down along with a lot of houses to make way for better houses and a new community centre along with a retirement/care home. The Whistlebury (Whistleberry) area of Whitehill was pulled down to make way for new housing. Most people were relocated to other estates in Hamilton or to other areas in Whitehill. It has had a lot of houses built in it to improve the area, with over two hundred houses demolished and re-built. Other recent developments in the area include the building of a large supermarket on the site of the old brickwork factory; the newly re-built Hamilton Academicals football stadium; and the very recent building of the new Holy Cross High School in the grounds of the Bothwell Road Park, which replaced the old Holy Cross High School in the towns' Muir Street. The supermarket is built on the former Douglas Park home to the Accies, and the former Barrow Works. The Brickworks was on Auchenraith Avenue at its junction with May Street and entrance to the public park. The Bothwell Road Park also houses a new centre for the care of people with dementia; named after two local Councillors.

Whitehill's is the location for the Whitehill Stores ltd shop, Take away and Cafe, Hairdressers and Chapel.
