= Earnock High School =

Secondary school in South Lanarkshire, Scotland

Coordinates: 55.7684°N 4.0726°W

- Hamilton, South Lanarkshire; Scotland

Information
- Established: 1957
- Closed: 2007

Earnock High School in Hamilton, South Lanarkshire served students in and around the Earnock area from 1957 to 2007. The school was closed in June 2007 and merged with Blantyre High to form Calderside Academy. A housing development, Earnock Glen, now occupies the site.

== Fire ==
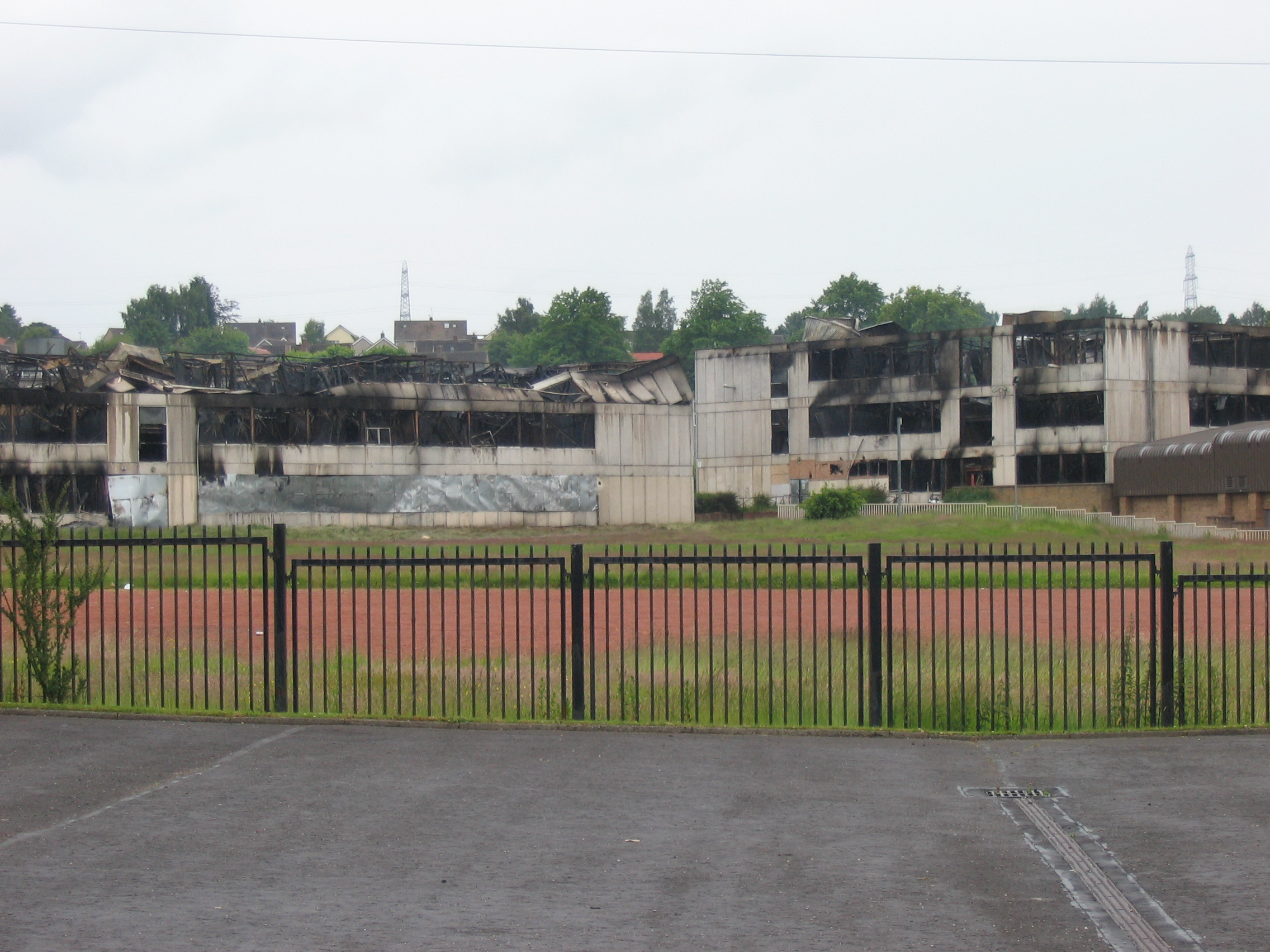
Earnock High School after the fire

On 21 June 2008, at around 1.50am, the disused building of Earnock High was set alight. Both the Science and Main Teaching Blocks were extensively damaged — with damage to all three floors in each. At the height of the blaze around thirty firefighters were tackling it — aided by five fire engines and two aerial appliances.
