= Hamilton Sheriff Court =

Judicial building in Hamilton, Scotland

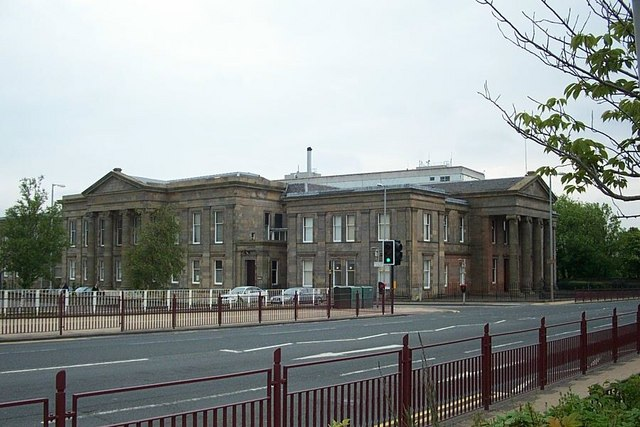
- Hamilton Sheriff Court

- Shown in South Lanarkshire
- 55.7794°N 4.0487°W
- Location: Almada Street, Hamilton

History
- Built: 1834

Site notes
- Architect: John Lamb Murray
- Architectural style: Neoclassical style

Listed Building – Category A
- Official name: Hamilton Sheriff Court including boundary walls and railings, Almada Street, Beckford Street, Hamilton
- Designated: 5 February 1971
- Reference no.: LB34470

Hamilton Sheriff Court is a judicial building in Almada Street, Hamilton, South Lanarkshire, Scotland. The building, which continues to serve as the local courthouse, is a Category A listed building.

== History ==
Lanark and Hamilton Gaol, Court Houses and Public Offices Act 1833
- Act of Parliament
- Parliament of the United Kingdom
- Long title: An Act for erecting and maintaining a Gaol, Court Houses, and Public Offices for the Burgh of Lanark and the Upper Ward of the County of Lanark; and also for erecting and maintaining a Gaol, Court Houses, and Public Offices for the Burgh of Hamilton and Middle Ward of the said County.
- Citation: 3 & 4 Will. 4. c. cviii

Dates
- Royal assent: 28 June 1833

Text of statute as originally enacted

Lanark and Hamilton Court House and County Rates Act 1848
- Act of Parliament
- Parliament of the United Kingdom
- Long title: An Act to raise a further Sum of Money for the Court House and Offices at Hamilton, and to alter the Mode assessing and levying certain Rates and Assessments in the County of Lanark.
- Citation: 11 & 12 Vict. c. xxxii

Dates
- Royal assent: 30 June 1848

Text of statute as originally enacted

The first judicial building in Hamilton, which contained a council chamber, a courthouse and a jail, was built adjoining the old tolbooth at the junction of Castle Street and Palace Grounds Road and was completed in 1798. (Note: The old town house was demolished in 1954, when a scroll was found recording its date of construction.) By the 1830s, the tolbooth complex was very dilapidated and it was decided that "soon all be removed, except the steeple, town clock, and bell."

The foundation stone for a new courthouse was laid on 10 June 1834. It was designed in the neoclassical style, built in ashlar stone and was completed later that year. The original design involved a symmetrical main frontage of seven bays facing onto Almada Street. The central section of the three bays featured a full height tetrastyle portico formed by Ionic order columns supporting a frieze, an entablature and a pediment. There were two-bay wings on either side fenestrated by sash windows. Internally, the principal rooms were the main courtroom, in the centre of the building on the ground floor, and a large hall on the first floor, which was established for county meetings. (Note: Until 1890, Lanarkshire was divided into three administrative wards: lower (Glasgow), middle (Hamilton) and upper (Lanark) and this building was the meeting place for the middle ward. After the formation of Lanarkshire County Council in 1890, the county council also sometimes met in the Almada Street / Beckford Street building.) A jail building was also established to the north of the courthouse.

The courthouse was re-modelled to a design by John Lamb Murray in 1886. The works included single-bay extensions, which were slightly projected forward, at either end on the Almada Street frontage. The new bays were fenestrated by sash windows, with architraves and cornices; these windows were flanked by full-height Doric order pilasters supporting friezes, entablatures and cornices. The jail building was demolished, creating space for a long extension along Beckford Street, consisting of a nine-bay central section, which featured another full-height tetrastyle portico, short recessed connecting sections, and three bay wings, all designed by Murray.

The complex continued to serve as the local sheriff court throughout the 20th century and into the 21st century. However, a new building known as Birnie House in Caird Street, was acquired in 2006 to deal with civil and family cases, allowing the Almada Street / Beckford Street building to focus on criminal cases. It remains the third busiest courthouse in Scotland after Edinburgh and Glasgow.

The court scenes for series 6 of the BBC sitcom Still Game were filmed in the courthouse in 2007.

== See also ==
- List of Category A listed buildings in South Lanarkshire
- List of listed buildings in Hamilton, South Lanarkshire
