= Jim Mullen (businessman) =

Scottish business executive

- Born: James Joseph Mullen; June 1970 (age 56); Glasgow, Scotland
- Education: John Ogilvie High School; Glasgow Caledonian University
- Occupation: Businessman
- Title: CEO, Jockey Club
- Children: 2 sons

James Joseph Mullen (born June 1970) is a Scottish businessman, the chief executive (CEO) of the Jockey Club, the largest commercial horse racing organisation in the UK, and owner of 15 racecourses, including Aintree, Cheltenham, and Epsom Downs.

He has been the CEO of Reach plc, the UK's largest commercial news publisher, with titles including the Daily Mirror, and the Daily Express, and the CEO of Ladbrokes, the high street betting chain.

== Early life ==
Mullen was born in June 1970. He was born in Glasgow, and grew up with his grandparents, who taught him about betting.

Mullen was educated at John Ogilvie High School in Hamilton, South Lanarkshire. He has a bachelor's degree in computing from Glasgow Caledonian University, and a master's degree in software engineering.

== Career ==
On 1 April 2015, Mullen succeeded Richard Glynn as CEO of Ladbrokes, where he had previously been managing director of Ladbrokes Digital since October 2013. In July 2015, it was announced he would become CEO of Ladbrokes Coral, a new company borne out of a merger between Ladbrokes and smaller high street betting chain Gala Coral, with Ladbrokes Coral later being acquired by GVC Holdings in December 2017. Mullen stood down as CEO in March 2018, later joining Reach plc as CEO. Mullen took over as CEO of the Jockey Club in June 2025.

== Personal life ==
Mullen is married with two sons.
