= Blantyre, South Lanarkshire =

Town in South Lanarkshire, Scotland

Coordinates: 55°47′37″N 04°05′31″W

Blantyre: Scottish Gaelic: Blantaidhr
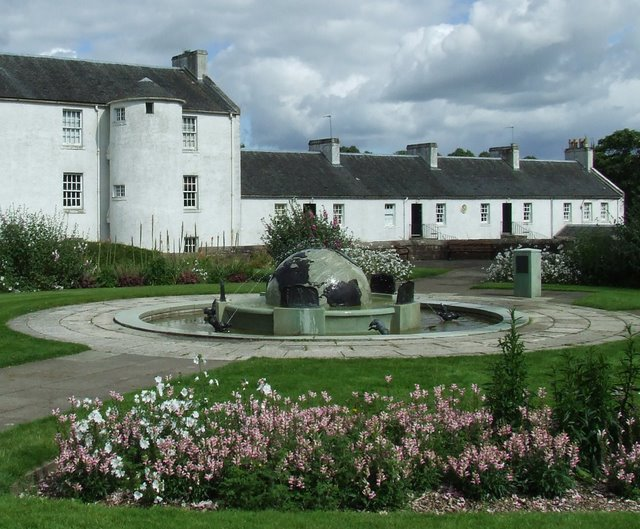
- Shuttle Row, the birthplace of David Livingstone

- Location within South Lanarkshire
- Population: 16,800 (2020)
- OS grid reference: NS685575
- Civil parish: Blantyre
- Council area: South Lanarkshire
- Lieutenancy area: Lanarkshire
- Country: Scotland
- Sovereign state: United Kingdom
- Post town: Glasgow
- Postcode district: G72
- Dialling code: 01698
- Police: Scotland
- Fire: Scottish
- Ambulance: Scottish
- UK Parliament: Rutherglen
- Scottish Parliament: Rutherglen

Blantyre ( or; Scottish Gaelic: Blantaidhr) is a town and civil parish in South Lanarkshire, Scotland, with a population of 16,900. It is bounded by the River Clyde to the north, the Rotten Calder to the west, the Park Burn to the east (denoting the boundary with the larger adjoining town of Hamilton) and the Rotten Burn to the south.

Blantyre was the birthplace of David Livingstone, the 19th-century explorer and missionary, and because of Livingstone's work, the second-largest city in Malawi is named after it.

== History ==
The name has a number of probable origins: originally Cumbric blaen tir "top of the land" which has been Gaelicised; an association with Saint Blane, whose associates have a number of local place-names named after them, such as Dalmarnock, and further afield, and personally, Dunblane.

The town consists of a number of small hamlets which have largely become connected into a single urban area, with housing in a variety of styles and ages reflecting the changing use and availability of land over the decades.

High Blantyre is the area to the east and south of Burnbrae Road which continues to High Blantyre Cross at the north. It is thought to be the area of earliest settlement, with a Bronze Age village near Auchintibber 2 miles (3 km) south of Blantyre Parish Church (High Blantyre). Also in this area is Greenhall Park, where the Calder (Cawther) flows north through a valley to eventually join the Clyde near Newton. A new residential development, Greenhall Village, was built at the western side of High Blantyre in the 2010s. There was previously a large mining community in this area clustered around several pits including Auchinraith and Larkfield which still exist as distinct communities within the town; weaving was another local occupation. A railway station (on the Hamilton and Strathaven Railway) was in use from the 1860s to the 1950s, located to the west of the church. High Blantyre Primary School was established in 1875, continuing through various reconstructions to its current buildings dating from 2005.

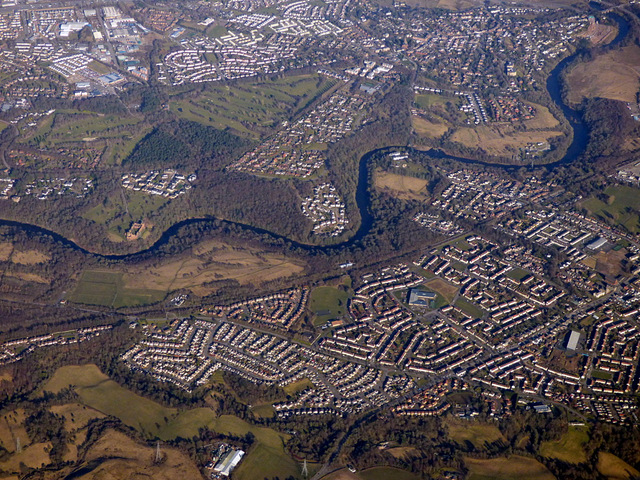
Western parts of Blantyre and the River Clyde from the air

At the western end of the main thoroughfare, Glasgow Road (A724) which runs east–west, is the Priory Bridge neighbourhood (named after the original bridge over the Calder towards Cambuslang, which itself was named after the now-ruined Blantyre Priory to the north of the town which was home to monks from around 1235). It borders the older and larger Coatshill housing estate which has its own schools and community facilities. On the other side of the main road from Coatshill is the similar neighbourhood of Wheatlands (parts of which were built by the Scottish Special Housing Association), while further east is the modern centre of the town, built up from the 19th-century mining communities at Stonefield and Low Blantyre featuring the local secondary school Calderside Academy, Stonefield public park, Blantyre Leisure Centre, several churches and the Clydeview Shopping Centre (which has featured a large Asda supermarket since its opening in 1980). Glasgow Road continues south-east via the A725 elevated bypass, the Springwells neighbourhood and the town boundary, leading on to Burnbank (specifically the area once known as Greenfield).

Further north of the town centre is The Village, the oldest industrially developed part of Blantyre which was previously a mill settlement on the River Clyde. Near to the town's train station, it is the only part which is north of the railway lines. Next to the David Livingstone Centre, at the end of Station Road, is an iron suspension footbridge which crosses the Clyde giving pedestrian access to Bothwell.

== Mine disaster ==
On 22 October 1877, Blantyre was the site of the Blantyre mining disaster, where 207 miners (men and boys) were killed when a coal mine exploded due to methane gas. A monument to the disaster, of which the youngest victim was a boy of 11, is at High Blantyre cross. The site of the mine now lies under the East Kilbride expressway.

== Nearby towns and cities ==
- Hamilton (borders the Burnbank, Hillhouse and Whitehill areas)
- Glasgow (City Centre) 8 mi (13 km)
- Bothwell 2 mi (3 km)
- Uddingston 3 mi (5 km)
- Cambuslang 2.5 mi (4.0 km)
- Rutherglen 5 mi (8 km)
- East Kilbride 4 mi (6 km)
- Motherwell 5 mi (8 km)

== Local economy ==
Historically, Blantyre's economy was driven first by mills opened in 1785 which then declined from the late 1860s. Then by coal mining, most notably by Dixon's Collieries, before shifting toward manufacturing and modern logistics in the late 20th century. Before the mining,

Today, the town's commercial activity is concentrated in two main hubs: the Blantyre Industrial Estate and the Hamilton International Technology Park (HITP).

The Hamilton International Technology Park, located on the High Blantyre boundary, acts as a major regional employment hub. It hosts the distribution centre for retailer John Lewis, the operational offices of ScottishPower, and the Scottish headquarters of Eden Springs UK, now BWT UK Limited. The park is also home to Daysoft, a contact lens manufacturer founded by Ron Hamilton.

To the north, the Blantyre Industrial Estate accommodates a mix of engineering and creative businesses. Notable tenants include the Chemikal Underground recording studio, founded by members of the band The Delgados, and various specialist engineering firms. Retail activity is focused around the Clydeview Shopping Centre and major supermarkets serving the local catchment.

== Sport ==
=== Football ===
Blantyre presently has a football club competing in Scottish Junior Football Association competitions, Blantyre Victoria, known as the Vics. They won the Scottish Junior Cup (the highest achievement in junior football) in 1950, 1970 and 1982. Their home ground is called Castle Park.

There is another football club in the town, Blantyre Celtic. The original club went out of existence in the early 1990s; however, in 2010 they reformed as an amateur team.

=== Speedway ===
The town of Blantyre has long had links with speedway racing. In the pioneer days a group of riders who appeared at White City in Glasgow were known as "The Blantyre Crowd". They operated their own track at Airbles Road in Motherwell in 1930 and this was known as Paragon Speedway. The Blantyre Crowd also operated a more professional version on the same site in 1932. Speedway was staged at the Blantyre Greyhound Stadium as the home of the Glasgow Tigers from 1977 to 1981, before the new road forced a move to Craighead Park, which closed down at the end of the 1986 season.

=== Skateboarding ===
Recently, Blantyre Skate Park has received a lot of business as the youth company Radworx has been operating within it as well as some other skate parks. The skate park contains a 4 ft (1.2 m) spine section as well as an 8 ft (2.4 m) halfpipe, alongside a 6 ft (1.8 m) counterpart. There is a 2 ft (0.6 m) mini-bowl and a credible street section which contains two fun boxes as well as a 5-set.

=== Redlees Park ===
During World War II, an Anti-aircraft battery and associated camp for military personnel known as the 'Whins' or 'Blantyreferme' was set up on open land off the Blantyre Farm Road between Newton and Blantyre. The camp was used as emergency accommodation after the conflict, but the huts were later demolished. However, some of the AA battery buildings survived into the 21st century (albeit heavily vandalised in some cases) and were incorporated – along with a former clay quarry nearby – into the landscape of Redlees Urban Park developed by the local council.

== Education ==
- Primary schools (2019-20 pupil roll in parentheses):
  - St Blane's PS (220)
  - St Joseph's PS (300)
  - High Blantyre PS (244)
  - David Livingstone Memorial PS (268)
  - Auchinraith PS (295)
- Secondary schools:
  - Calderside Academy (1253)
  - John Ogilvie High School (Burnbank) (1027)
- Special Educational Needs:
  - Kear Campus (43)
- Higher Education:
  - University of the West of Scotland (Lanarkshire Campus); relocated from Bell College to Hamilton International Technology Park (within Blantyre) in 2018

== Institutions ==
Blantyre contains many amenities, including:

- Blantyre Leisure Centre – sports centre with swimming pool (opened 1982)
- Stonefield Park – with a purpose-built skate-park
- Victoria Nursing Home (for the elderly)
- David Livingstone Birthplace Museum – museum built in the birthplace and former home of David Livingstone
- Seven churches:
  - High Blantyre Baptist Church (Baptist)
  - Blantyre Congregational Church (Congregational)
  - St. Joseph's (R.C.)
  - Livingstone Memorial Parish Church (C.o.S.)
  - St. Andrew's (C.o.S.)
  - Saint John Ogilvie (R.C.)
  - Blantyre Old Parish Church of Scotland (C.o.S.)
- David Dale House – South Lanarkshire Council facility named after another famous Lanarkshire dweller (New Lanark)
- Blantyre Credit Union
- Terminal One Youth Centre – Fully equipped Youth Centre and Recording Studio

== Youth ==
In August 1983, a pressure group was formed in Blantyre called Blantyre Youth Council, which set up a youth enquiry service for young people and a Claimants Union. The Youth Enquiry Service Base was in the Elizabeth Scott Centre (now Terminal One). In 1984, Strathclyde Regional Council created Blantyre Youth Development Team (BYC agreed to disband and support this provided it was youth-led); the BYDT gained charity status in 1991 and created the Terminal One youth centre. It provides many services to the local young people,

== David Livingstone ==
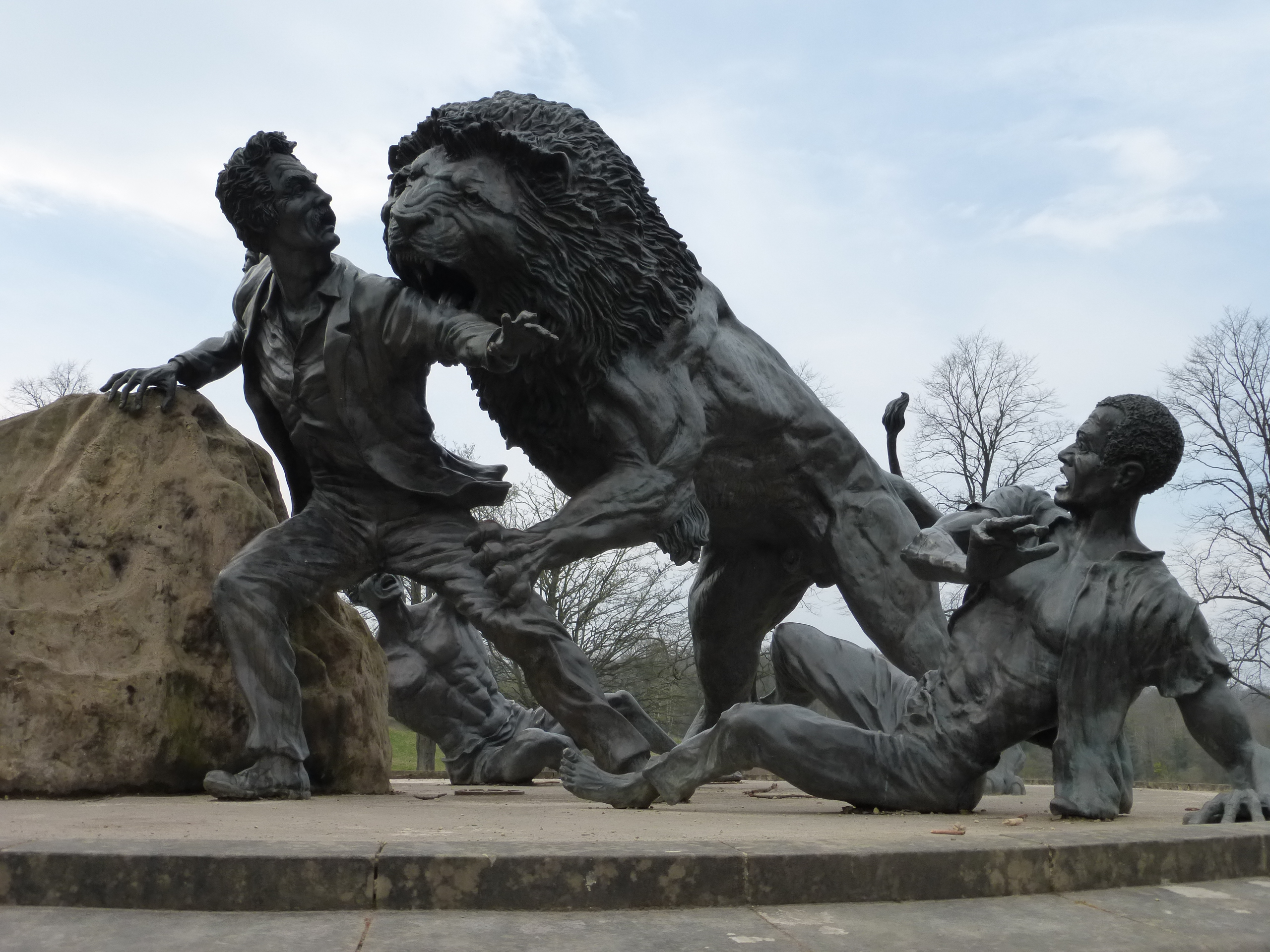
Livingstone's famous encounter with the lion at Mabotsa is the subject of a bronze sculpture in the grounds of the David Livingstone Centre. It was designed by Ray Harryhausen who was married to one of Livingstone's descendants from the American branch of the family.

Blantyre's most famous son is the 19th-century missionary and explorer David Livingstone. He is acknowledged as the first European to see the "Mosi-oa-Tunya" (Tokaleya and Tonga: "the Smoke that Thunders") which he named in English Victoria Falls after then British sovereign Queen Victoria.

His birthplace and childhood home is now a museum at the end of Station Road, Low Blantyre on the banks of the River Clyde. The Centre includes a museum dating from 1929 (now run by the National Trust for Scotland), a playpark, a cafe, a shop, an African Garden and several workshop studios. An adventure assault course also existed there before a young man died in 1995. A pedestrian footbridge over the River Clyde adjacent to the museum (its third incarnation) links the area to the town of Bothwell.

Mandala (the largest city and commercial centre of Malawi, one of the territories Livingstone explored) is more commonly named Blantyre in recognition of the link created by Livingstone during the colonial era.

== Notable natives or residents ==
- John Brown, footballer (Rangers)
- Martin Bulloch, drummer (Mogwai)
- Stuart Christie, anarchist
- Brian Connolly, musician
- John Fallon, footballer (Celtic, Lisbon Lions)
- Ryan Fletcher, actor
- Ken McKinlay, speedway rider
- Jim Mullen, CEO Ladbrokes PLC
- Philip Murray, American trade union leader
- Maureen Rooney, trade unionist
- Steven Smith, footballer (Rangers, Portland Timbers, Aberdeen, Kilmarnock)
- Ian Stewart, former Labour MP for Eccles.
- William Bauchop Wilson, 1st United States Secretary of Labor
- James Cleland Richardson, Victoria Cross, Canadian Corps, World War 1

== See also ==
- List of places in South Lanarkshire
- Blantyre (ward)
