= St John Ogilvie High School =

Coordinates: 55°46′45″N 4°04′45″W

Saint John Ogilvie High School
- Burnbank, Hamilton, ML3 9LA; Scotland

Information
- Type: Secondary School
- Motto: Latin: Fidelis Ad Finem
- Religious affiliation: Roman Catholic
- Patron saint: Saint John Ogilvie
- Authority: South Lanarkshire
- Headteacher: Lorna Lawson
- Staff: 74 FTE
- Gender: Mixed
- Age: 12 to 18
- Enrolment: 933
- School years: S1-S6
- Website: http://www.johnogilvie.s-lanark.sch.uk

Saint John Ogilvie High School is a Roman Catholic secondary state school located in the Burnbank area of Hamilton, South Lanarkshire, Scotland.

== Bus crash ==
On 4 June 2004, more than 200 students and about 10 staff from John Ogilvie High School and Coltness High School were travelling to Lightwater Valley theme park when they were involved in an accident at East Layton. Fifty-four children were injured in the crash, and three children were kept in hospital overnight, but there were no serious injuries.

== Rebuilding of the school ==
South Lanarkshire council announced on 22 August 2005 that it had gained planning permission to rebuild John Ogilvie, as well as several other high schools in the area, as part of a multi-million pound deal to modernise local schools. The new school was opened for the beginning of the 2008 school year with new facilities for each department.

== Academic performance ==
The school was involved in March 2007 in a row over the standard of teaching given to some students.

In August 2017, the school reported record high results. They broke some more records in 2018, 2019 and again in 2022.

== Renaming ==
The school was known as "St Cuthbert's High School", the name of the local parish church, until 1960 when it changed its name to "John Ogilvie High School".

In March 2015, to celebrate the 400th anniversary of the martyrdom of Saint John Ogilvie, the school under the leadership of head teacher Edward Morrison officially changed its name from "John Ogilvie High School" to "Saint John Ogilve High School."

== Notable former pupils ==
- Jim Mullen (b. 1970) — chief executive (CEO) of Ladbrokes
- Monica Lennon (b. 1981) — politician, MSP for Central Scotland
- Angela Crawley (b. 1987) — politician, MP for Lanark and Hamilton East
