= Calderside Academy =

Secondary school in South Lanarkshire, Scotland

Coordinates: 55°47′30″N 4°05′40″W

Location
- Calder Street; Blantyre; Glasgow, South Lanarkshire, G72 0AX; Scotland

Information
- School type: State-funded Comprehensive
- Motto: "We ARE Calderside; Ambitious, Respectful, Excellent"
- Denomination: Nondenominational
- Established: January 2008
- Head teacher: Julie Calder
- Age: 11 to 18
- Enrollment: 1400
- Language: English
- Campus: Main Building (6 wings and 'street' area)
- Campus type: Urban
- Houses: Lewis, Skye, Mull, Arran
- Colour
- Accreditation: Qualifications Scotland
- National ranking: 265/355 (2023/24)
- Newspaper: Calderside Newsletter
- Communities served: Blantyre, Hamilton
- Feeder schools: Townhill Primary, David Livingstone Memorial Primary, Auchinraith Primary, High Blantyre Primary, Neilsland Primary, Udston Primary, Woodhead Primary, Glenlee Primary, Craighead School, Hamilton School for the Deaf
- Website: http://www.calderside.s-lanark.sch.uk

Calderside Academy is a Scottish secondary school in Blantyre. It was created by merging two local secondary schools (Blantyre High School and Earnock High School) on the land where Blantyre High School was. The school opened in January 2008 and was ceremonially opened by Fiona Hyslop MSP in November 2008.

The Academy has approximately 1400 pupils and around 100 teachers, making it one of the largest schools in Scotland.

== Notable pupils ==
- Jordan Allan (born 1998), footballer

== Staff ==
- Ms J Calder, Head Teacher
- Miss P McCaig, Depute Head Teacher S1
- Mr S Gilkison, Depute Head Teacher S2
- Mrs P Gillespie, Depute Head Teacher S3
- Mrs M Porch, Depute Head Teacher S4
- Mr J Monaghan, Depute Head Teacher S5/6
- Mrs A Lockhart, Depute Head Teacher ASN
- Mr M Wilkie, Depute Head Teacher S3
- Mr D Murray, Depute Head Teacher ASN
- Mrs P Campbell
