= Alexander Cullen (architect) =

Scottish architect and town planner

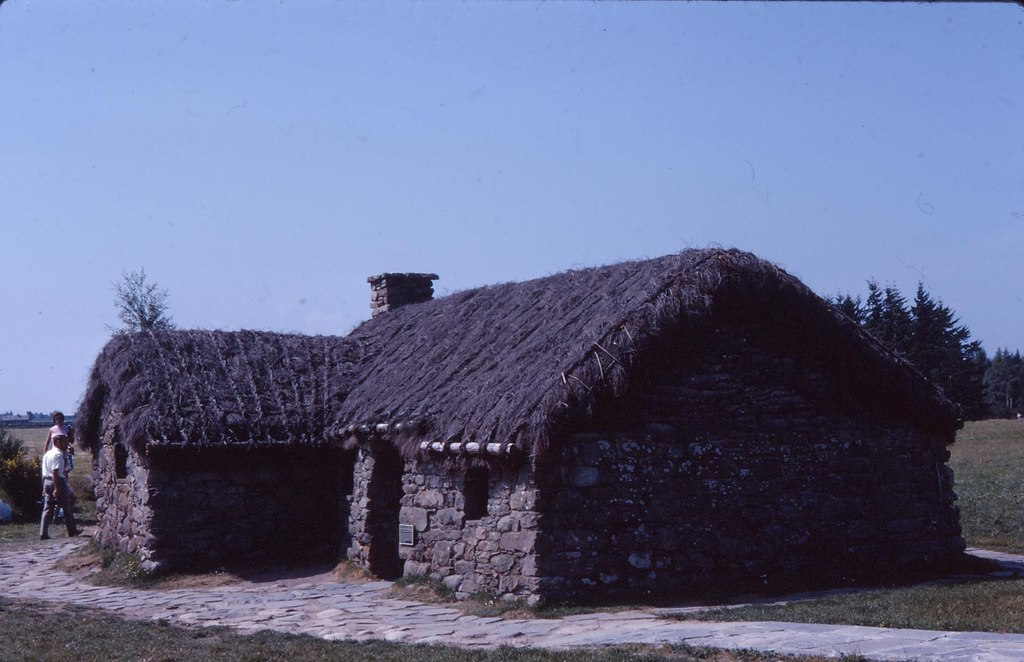
Old Leanach Cottage on Culloden Moor, restored by Alexander Cullen in 1960

Alexander Cullen FRSE OBE (1892–1963) was a Scottish architect and town planner operating in the 20th century. In 1951 he became President of the Royal Incorporation of Architects in Scotland (RIAS). He was noted as a sensitive designer within rural Scotland.

== Life ==
He was born on 9 April 1892 in Hamilton, Scotland the son of Alexander Cullen, an architect and well noted theatre design specialist, and his wife, Barbara Rodger. His father had designed Motherwell YMCA building in 1898, as well as Clyde Chambers in Wishaw in 1905.

He attended Hamilton Academy and Glasgow High School and then studied architecture at Glasgow School of Art from 1910. He was then apprenticed into his father’s (and grandfather’s) firm of Cullen, Lochead and Brown.

He qualified ARIBA in 1920 (delayed due to the First World War. During his life this was elevated to FRIBA with Distinction and a Diploma in Town Planning With Distinction. He operated from Hamilton, Lanarkshire but lived in Uddingston.

He was elected a Fellow of the Royal Society of Edinburgh in 1948. His proposers were William Edward Whyte, Sir Frank Mears, William Murdoch Cumming and Octave Sneeden.

In 1946 he was appointed County Architect and Planner to Inverness-shire under the newly devised British Planning regimes. During this period he specialised in housing schemes sympathetically revitalising rural communities, receiving a Saltire Society Award for his work.

On retiral he retained other architectural roles including Governor of Glasgow School of Art which he continued until 1958.

He died on 7 November 1963 and was survived by his wife.

== War Services ==
His career was twice interrupted by war but each time he served his country with distinction. In the First World War he was commissioned as an officer in the King’s Own Scottish Borderers and later transferred to the Machine Gun Corps, serving in France. He was at Arras in 1916 and Amiens in 1917. He left the army in 1919 but joined the Territorial Army.

Given his previous experience, on the onset of the Second World War he was immediately placed as a Lieutenant-Colonel in the Cameronians. He saw service again in France, including the evacuation of his battalion from Cherbourg Naval Base in 1941, for which action he later received the Order of the British Empire.

== Notable buildings ==
- Chapeltoun House, Stewarton, Ayrshire (1910). The house was designed for Hugh Neilson, the owner of Summerlee Iron Company in Coatbridge.
- Glasgow High School War Memorial (1925)
- Grandstand and Pavilion, Selkirk Rugby Club (1926)
- Palais de Dance, Hamilton, Lanarkshire (1927)
- St Margaret's Church, Restalrig, Edinburgh (1928)
- Hamilton Townhouse (1928)
- Hamilton Bus Station (1929)
- Catholic School, Lochaber (1951)
- Dalneigh Primary School (1951–54)
- Dalbeath Primary School (1952)
- Housing at Uig, Skye (1953)
- Housing at Carrbridge (1954)
- Housing at Broadfoot, Skye (1954)
- Housing at Beauly (1954)
- Housing at Nethy Bridge (1956)
- Tormore distillery (1958) with design input from Sir Albert Richardson
- Restoration of Old Leonach Cottage on Culloden Battlefield (1960)
