= Sneeden =

Sneeden is a surname. Notable people with the surname include:

- Emory M. Sneeden (1927–1987), American judge
- Octave Sneeden (1893–1973), Scottish engineer and author
