= Hamilton, South Lanarkshire =

Coordinates: 55.777°N 4.039°W

Hamilton: Scottish Gaelic: Baile Hamaltan; Scots: Hamiltoun
- Town and administrative centre
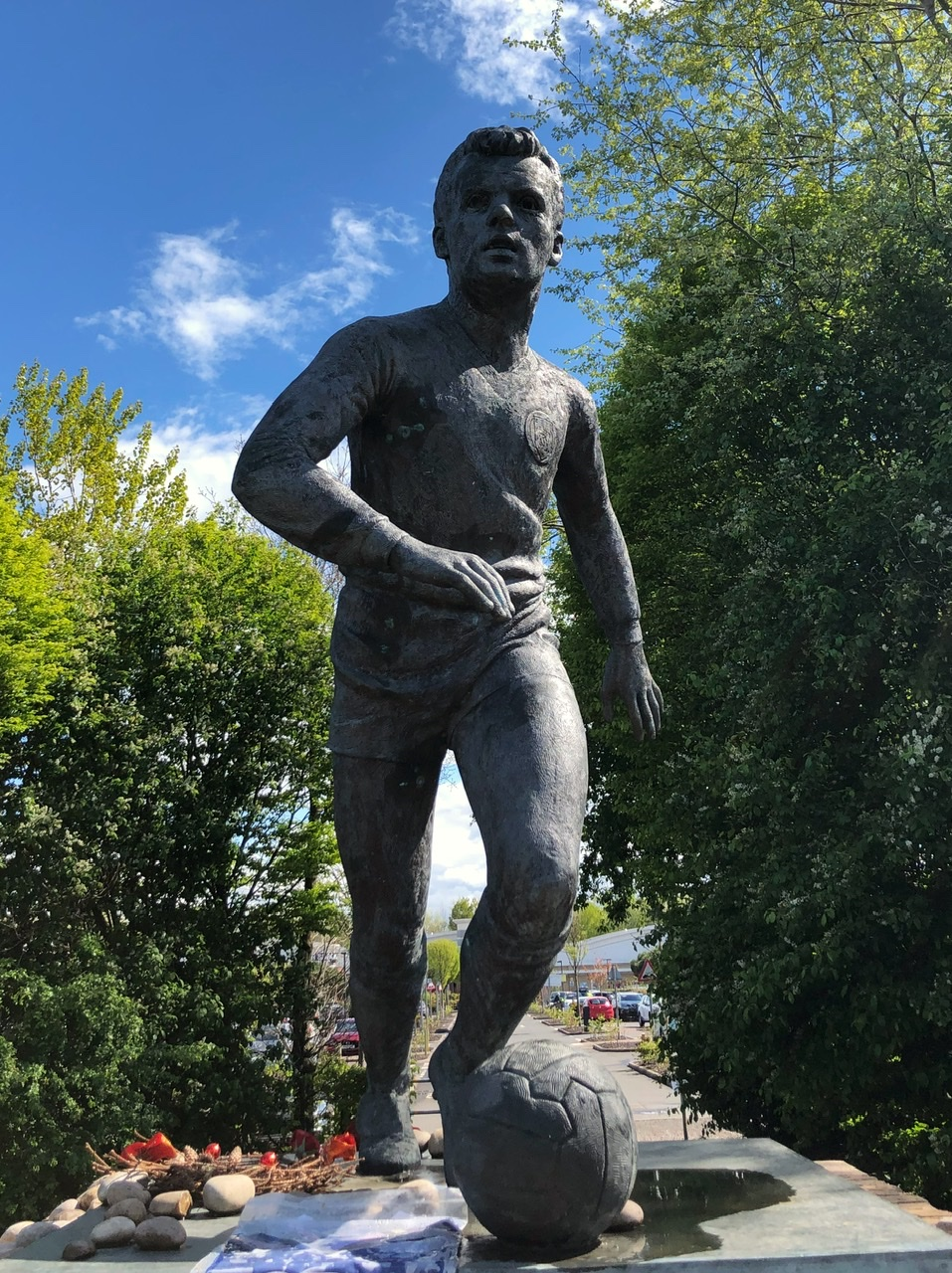
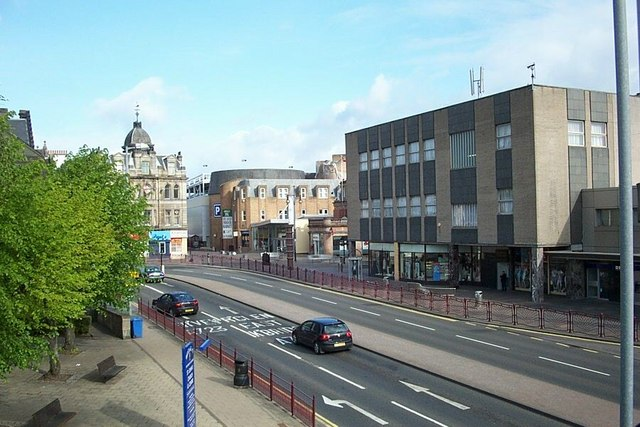
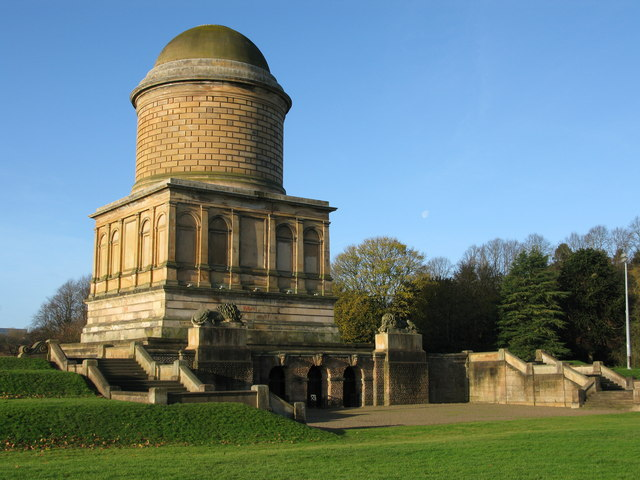
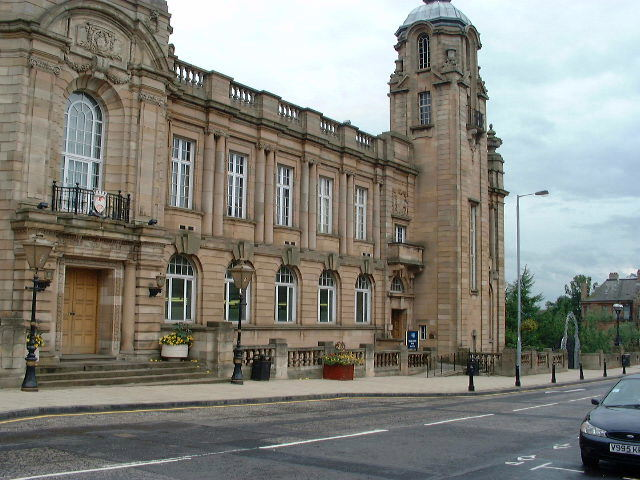
- From the top left: Statue of Davie Cooper, Town centre, The Mausoleum & The Townhouse

- Location within South Lanarkshire
- Area: 16.3 km^{2} (6.3 sq mi)
- Population: 55,157 (2022)
  - Density: 3,384/km^{2} (8,760/sq mi)
- OS grid reference: NS712557
  - Edinburgh: 35 mi (56 km)
  - London: 336 mi (541 km)
- Council area: South Lanarkshire
- Lieutenancy area: Lanarkshire
- Country: Scotland
- Sovereign state: United Kingdom
- Post town: HAMILTON
- Postcode district: ML3
- Dialling code: 01698
- Police: Scotland
- Fire: Scottish
- Ambulance: Scottish
- UK Parliament: Hamilton and Clyde Valley; Rutherglen
- Scottish Parliament: Hamilton, Larkhall and Stonehouse (Primarily); Uddingston and Bellshill (Whitehill and Bothwell Road areas)

Hamilton (Scots: Hamiltoun; Scottish Gaelic: Baile Hamaltan [ˈpalə ˈhaməl̪ˠt̪ʰan]) is a town in South Lanarkshire, Scotland. It serves as the main administrative centre of the South Lanarkshire council area. It sits 10 miles (16 km) south-east of Glasgow, 37 miles (60 km) south-west of Edinburgh and 74 miles (120 km) north of Carlisle. It is situated on the south bank of the River Clyde at its confluence with the Avon Water. Hamilton is the county town of the historic county of Lanarkshire and is the location of the headquarters of the modern local authority of South Lanarkshire.

The town itself has a population of 55,157 in 2022, which makes it the 9th largest locality in Scotland, and anchors a defined settlement of 84,000 (including neighbouring Blantyre, Bothwell and Uddingston) which is the country's 8th largest.

== History ==
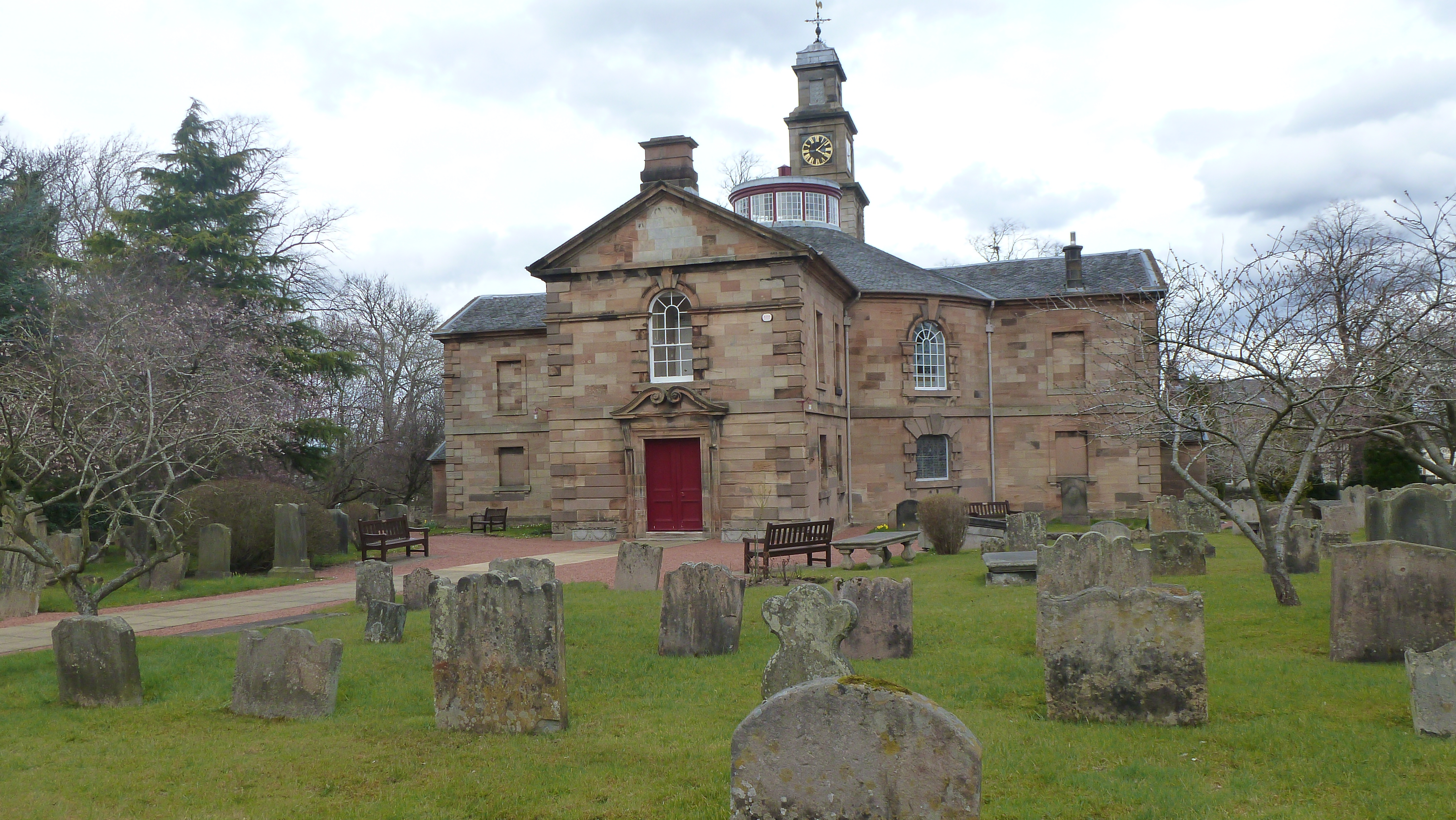
Hamilton Old Parish Church

The town of Hamilton was originally known as Cadzow or Cadyou (Middle Scots: Cadȝow), the "ȝ" being the letter yogh), pronounced /kadju/. It is an ancient settlement, possibly dating back to the days of Strathclyde, or perhaps earlier. The Roman fort of Bothwellhaugh lies nearby. A lost medieval settlement was excavated in the 2010s near the Clyde, only around 1 mile from the current town. It is known that kings of Strathclyde did have a hunting lodge near Cadzow, and the area may have been a royal centre during the later stages of the kingdom, as a precursor to Cadzow Castle.

During the Wars of Scottish Independence the Hamilton family initially supported the English and Walter fitz Gilbert (the head of the Hamilton family) was governor of Bothwell Castle on behalf of the English. However, he later changed loyalty to Robert the Bruce, following the Battle of Bannockburn, and ceded Bothwell to him. For this act, he was rewarded with a portion of land which had been forfeited by the Comyns at Dalserf and later the Barony and lands of Cadzow, which in time would become the town of Hamilton.

Cadzow was renamed Hamilton in the time of James, Lord Hamilton, who was married to Princess Mary, the daughter of King James II. The Hamilton family themselves most likely took their name from the lands of Humbleton or Homildon in Northumberland, or perhaps from a place near Leicester.

The Hamiltons constructed many landmark buildings in the area including the Hamilton Mausoleum in Strathclyde Park, which has one of the longest reverb times of any manmade building at 15 seconds. The Hamilton family are major land-owners in the area to this day. Hamilton Palace was the seat of the Dukes of Hamilton until the early-twentieth century.

Other historic buildings in the area include Hamilton Old Parish Church, a Georgian era building completed in 1734 and the only church to have been built by William Adam. The graveyard of the old parish church contains some Covenanter remains. Hamilton Townhouse, which now houses a library and concert hall, underwent a sympathetic modernization in 2002 and opened to the public in summer 2004. The ruins of Cadzow Castle also lie in Chatelherault Country Park, 2 miles (3 km) from the town centre.

Hamilton Palace was the largest non-royal residence in the Western world, located in the north-east of the town. A former seat of the Dukes of Hamilton, it was built in 1695, subsequently much enlarged, and demolished in 1921 due to ground subsidence. It is widely acknowledged as having been one of the grandest houses in Scotland, was visited and admired by Queen Victoria, and was written about by Daniel Defoe.

Hamilton Barracks was formerly the Depot of the Cameronians (Scottish Rifles) and the home of the 1st Battalion of the Regiment. The Regimental Museum is part of the Low Parks Museum.

The Low Parks Museum is housed in what was a 16th-century inn and a staging post for journeys between Glasgow and Edinburgh. Recently refurbished, it is the oldest building in Hamilton and is to the north of the Palace Grounds.

Renowned explorer and missionary David Livingstone's house still stands at 17 Burnbank Road and has a plaque about him.

== Governance ==
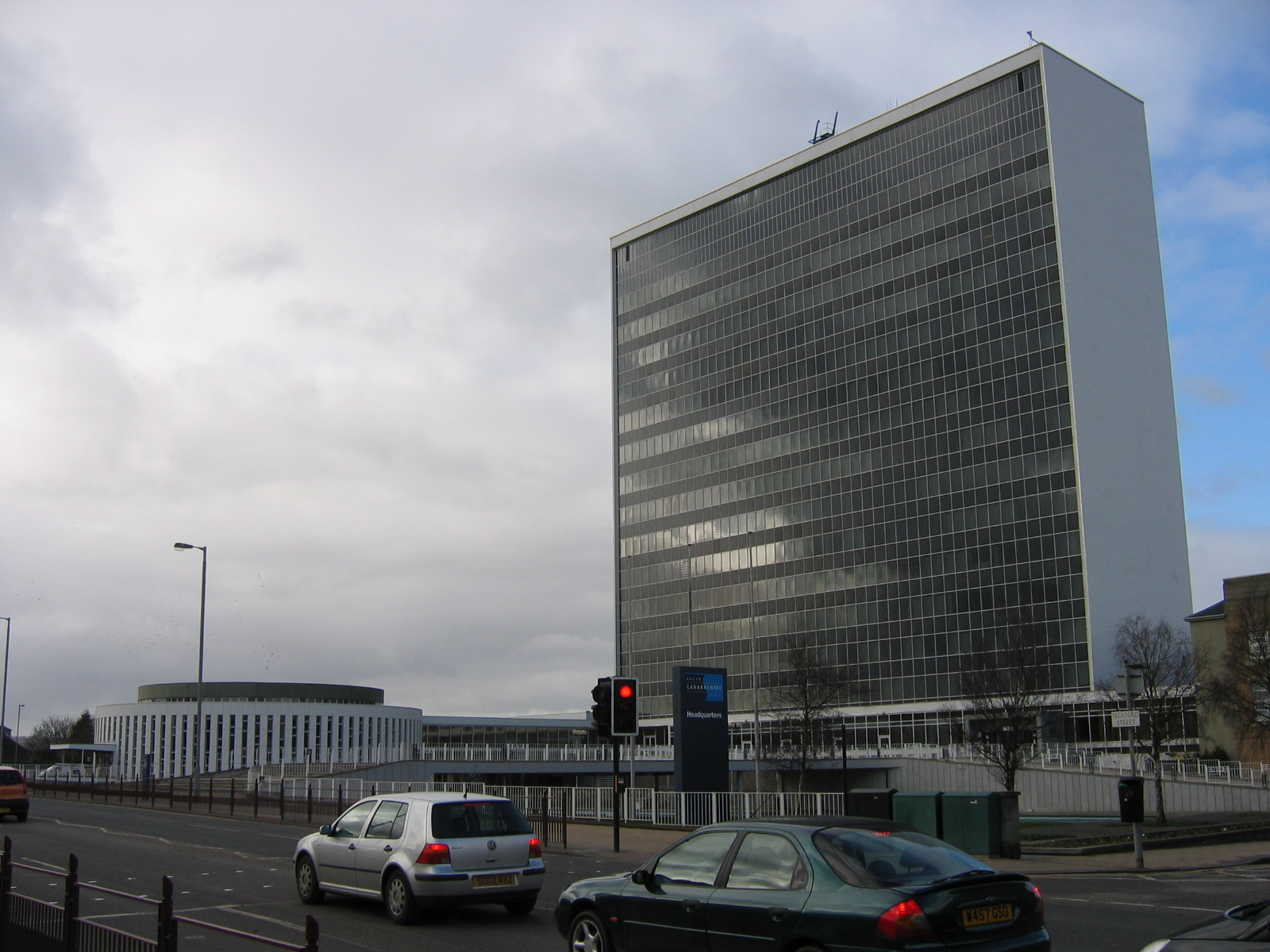
The council headquarters in Hamilton

Hamilton is located within the Scottish council area of South Lanarkshire. Its local government services are provided by the unitary authority the South Lanarkshire Council, which is headquartered in Hamilton. Hamilton itself is divided between three wards, totalling 11 seats: Hamilton North and East, Hamilton West and Earnock and Hamilton South.

Hamilton is represented in the House of Commons by two Members of Parliament (MPs). The following MPs were elected from Hamilton:

- Imogen Walker (Labour) in Hamilton and Clyde Valley, first elected in 2024.
- Michael Shanks (Labour) in Rutherglen, first elected in 2023.

Hamilton is also represented in the Scottish Parliament by two constituency MSPs. The following MSPs were elected from Hamilton:

- Alex Kerr (SNP) in Hamilton, Larkhall and Stonehouse, first elected in May 2026.
- Steven Bonnar (SNP) in Uddingston and Bellshill, first elected in May 2026. The Uddingston and Bellshill constituency covers the Whitehill and Bothwell Road areas of Hamilton.

== Geography ==
Areas of Hamilton:

- Avongrove
- Burnbank
- Barncluith
- Brackenhill Park
- Earnock Estate
- Earnock Glen
- Ferniegair
- Eddlewood
- Fairhill
- Hamilton West
- High Earnock
- Hillhouse
- Laighstonehall
- Little Earnock
- Low Waters
- Meikle Earnock
- Neilsland
- Silvertonhill
- Torheads Farm
- Udston
- Whitehill
- Woodhead

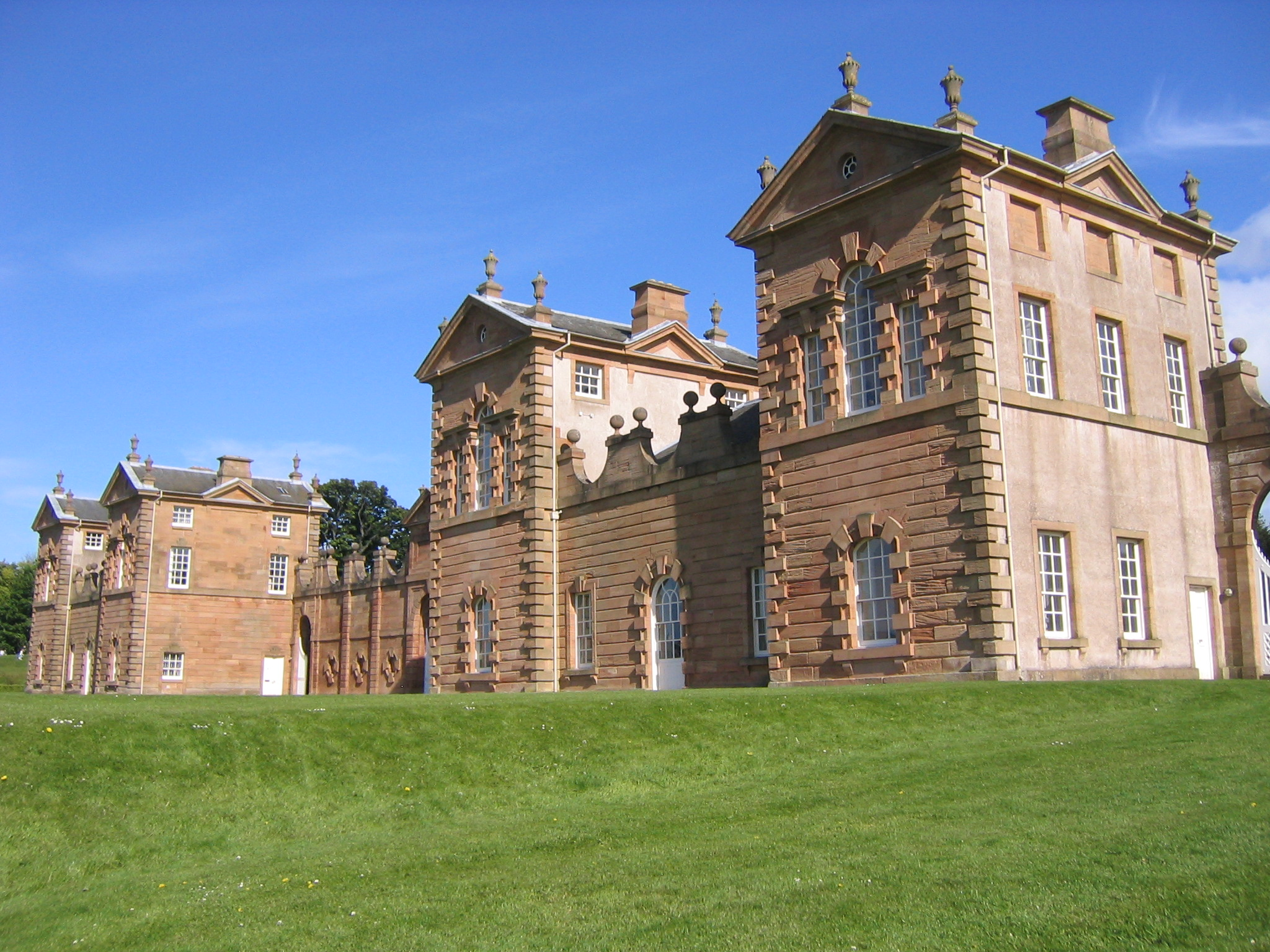
Chatelherault Hunting Lodge

Nearby prominent towns and cities:

- East Kilbride 5 miles (8 km)
- Glasgow 12 miles (19 km)
- Edinburgh 35 miles (56 km)
- Carlisle 74 miles (120 km)

The following towns/villages directly border Hamilton: Blantyre, East Kilbride, Quarter, Strathaven, Motherwell, Bothwell, Ferniegair, Limekilnburn.

Hamilton is twinned with Châtellerault in France. This connection dates from the 16th century when the title Duc de Châtellerault was conferred on James Hamilton, 2nd Earl of Arran. The Duke's Chatelherault Hunting Lodge (now in Chatelherault Country Park), a primary school and new railway station are named 'Chatelherault' for this reason.

== Economy ==
Service industries and local government are major employers in Hamilton. The town centre has been regenerated with new indoor shopping centres (the Regent Shopping Centre, New Cross Shopping Centre) Hamilton Retail Park and the Palace Grounds Retail Park.

Restaurants and national retail outlets are situated in a redeveloped part of the Palace Grounds that are visible upon entering the town from the M74 motorway. The creation of a circular town square has resulted in Hamilton receiving numerous town planning awards during the past decade. This development transformed the Hamilton side of Strathclyde Park, which was the original site of the Duke's palace. Hamilton has been a Fairtrade Town since 2005.

== Transport ==
Hamilton has three railway stations, Hamilton Central, Hamilton West and Chatelherault on the Argyle Line's Hamilton Circle. Hamilton Central is approx 25 minutes from Glasgow on the Larkhall-Dalmuir service. It was once served by the North British Railway, which had three stations in the area - Hamilton (NBR), Peacock Cross railway station and Burnbank.

Beside Hamilton Central lies Hamilton Bus Station, providing links to surrounding towns and cities, also offering an express bus to Glasgow and also some parts of England. National Express services run to London and Birmingham from this station.

Major roads in the town include the A72 running south-east to Larkhall, the A723 south to Strathaven / north-east to Motherwell, and the A724 west towards Rutherglen, while to the west at Blantyre, the A725 dual carriageway connects the area to East Kilbride, Coatbridge and the M8. By road the town is to the west of the M74 motorway, the main southerly link to England, which joins the M6 just north of Carlisle. The main route from Edinburgh is the M8, leaving at junctions 6 or 7.

Cycling paths run from Strathclyde Park to Chatelherault Country Park following the banks of the Clyde and Avon. These are being expanded at part of the Sustrans Connect2 project and will make up part of the National Cycle Route 74 which will run from Uddingston to Carlisle, Cumbria

== Education ==
There are currently three comprehensive high schools in the town – Hamilton Grammar, Holy Cross High School and St.John Ogilvie High School. The former Earnock High School merged with Blantyre High School in 2008 to create Calderside Academy. Hamilton also has one private school, Hamilton College, a Christian co-educational establishment comprising nursery, primary and high school.

There are 17 local authority primary schools in Hamilton; nine non-denominational and eight Roman Catholic schools. There are also provisions for children with Additional Support Needs, and the Hamilton School for the Deaf.

Hamilton is a university town with The University of the West of Scotland campus formerly sited on Almada Street, but now relocated to Hamilton International Technology Park in High Blantyre.

== Sports ==
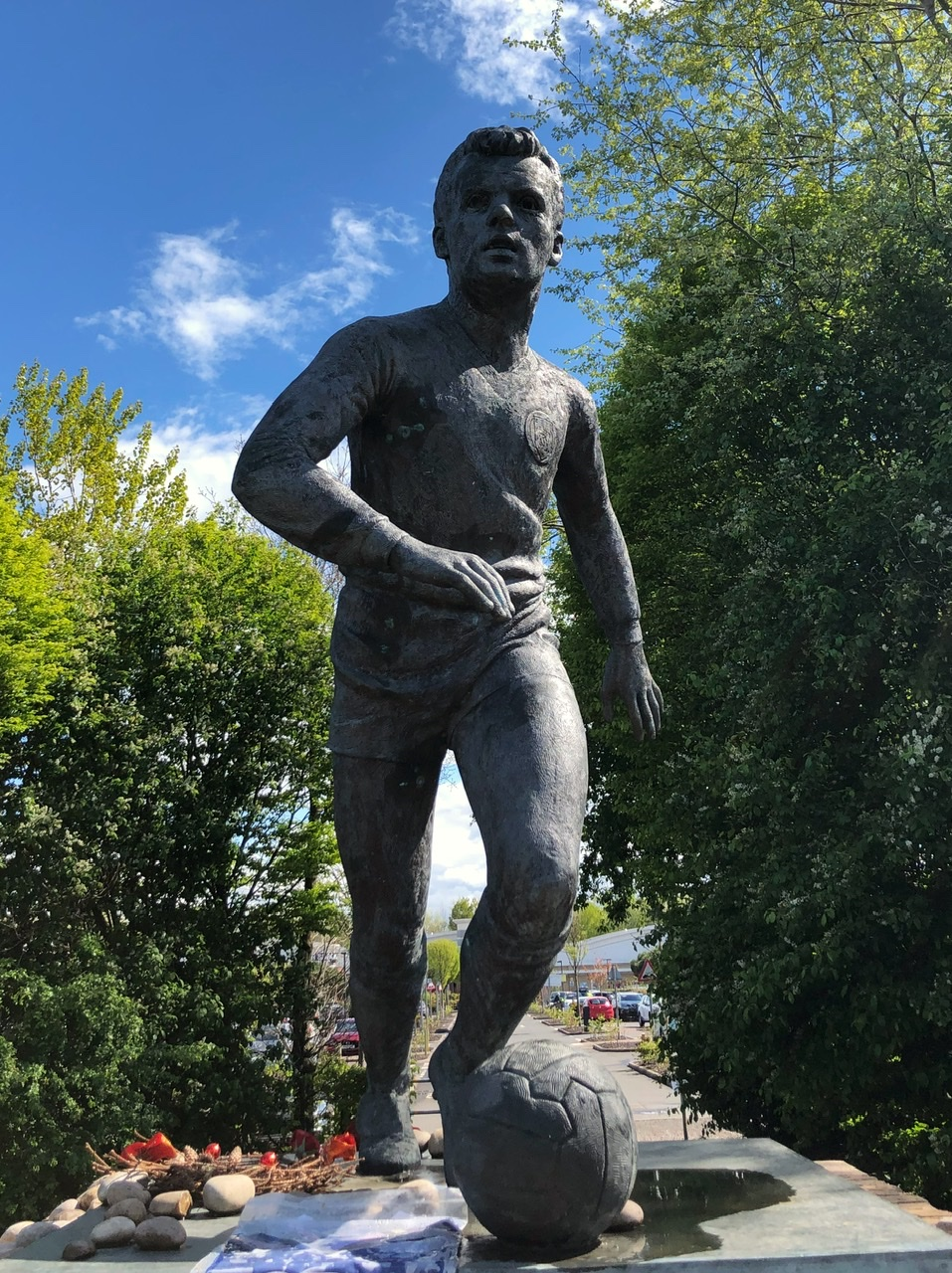
Statue in Hamilton of Davie Cooper, Scottish international footballer

Hamilton Academical Football Club (the Accies) was formed in 1874 and is one of Scotland's oldest senior clubs. It takes its name from Hamilton Academy, now called Hamilton Grammar School, the oldest school in the town (founded 1588). It is the only professional football team in the UK to originate from a school team and they currently play in the Scottish League One. Their stadium is New Douglas Park, built in 2001 near the site of the former ground Douglas Park (which was demolished in 1994 to make way for a retail park).

Hamilton Rugby Club is based at the Laigh Bent sports ground, Bent Road. They currently play in Tennent's National League Division Three.

Hamilton Park Racecourse, a horseracing, wedding and event venue, is located in the town.

Hamilton's Ice Rink hosts facilities for ice skating, curling, ice hockey and squash to both the general public and competitive teams.

SLC Leisure has a number of facilities based in Hamilton. There are three council run Leisure Centres which comprise gyms, swimming pools, fitness classes and more Hamilton Palace Sports Grounds provide the town with rugby, cricket, tennis, football and bowling areas. Strathclyde Park Golf Centre driving range and 9-hole course is based in Hamilton, while the Hamilton Golf Club (dating from 1892) is situated across the Avon Water in nearby Ferniegair.

The town is also home to several large gym chains, such as David Lloyd (formerly Virgin Active Health Club), which hosted the tennis at the 2011 International Children's Games.

Speedway racing was staged in Hamilton for one off shows from 1947 to 1955 on the old ash football pitches of Strathclyde Park (now covered by the town square).

== Entertainment ==
Hamilton Townhouse Theatre is a 712-seat venue in the Cadzow Street area of the town. A multiplex Vue Cinema is located in the redeveloped Palace Grounds area close to the ROC nightclub.

== Notable people ==
=== Science and exploration ===
- William Aiton (1731–1793) botanist, born near Hamilton
- Charles Alston (botanist)
- Matthew Baillie (scientist) (attended the local grammar school)
- William Cullen (physician & chemist)
- David Livingstone (explorer and missionary) (Born in Blantyre and lived in Hamilton as an adult.)
- John Roberton (physician and controversial social reformer)
- John Roberton (obstetrician and social reformer)

=== Business, military and political ===
- W. G. S. Adams (political scientist)
- Alexander Cairncross (economist) (educated at Hamilton Academy)
- Alexander Cullen (architect)
- Doug Finley (Canadian Senator and principal operational strategist of the Conservative Party of Canada)
- William Logan (philanthropist)
- Margo MacDonald (politician)
- Sir George Arthur Mitchell (businessman)
- Iain Stewart (politician)

=== Art and literature ===
- Joanna Baillie (poet) (lived in the town as a child)
- Martin Boyce (artist)
- David Carlyle (actor)
- Thomas Clark (writer)
- Robin Jenkins (novelist) (attended Hamilton Academy)
- Hannah Brown Mackenzie (poet and novelist)
- John Mather (artist)

=== Sport ===
- Jim Bett (Aberdeen & Scotland footballer)
- Craig Brown (Scotland football manager and former Aberdeen FC Manager)
- Jamie Burnett (snooker professional)
- Bill Carnihan (footballer)
- Davie Cooper (Clydebank, Rangers, Motherwell & Scotland footballer)
- Barry Ferguson (Rangers & Scotland Captain)
- Steven Fletcher (Wolves & Scotland footballer)
- Elenor Gordon (swimmer)
- Paul Hartley (Dundee manager & Scotland footballer)
- David Herd (Arsenal, Manchester United & Scotland footballer)
- John Paul McBride (St. Johnstone footballer)
- Walter McGowan (boxer)
- Paul McStay (Celtic & Scotland footballer)
- Jackie Oakes (Blackburn Rovers F.C., Manchester City F.C. and Queen of the South F.C. footballer)
- Phil O'Donnell (Motherwell, Celtic, Sheffield Wednesday & Scotland footballer)
- Bobby Shearer (Rangers & Scotland footballer)
- Jock Stein (Celtic & Scotland manager) born Burnbank
- John Fox Watson (Real Madrid & Fulham footballer)

=== Entertainment and broadcasting ===
- Jackie Bird (broadcaster) (attended school in Hamilton)
- Laurie Brett (actress)
- Ian Buchanan (actor)
- Brian Connolly (musician)
- Patricia Dainton (actress)
- Sir Harry Lauder (entertainer) (lived in Hamilton)
- Allan Lee (film editor)
- Katie Leung (actor)
- Marie McLaughlin (opera singer)
- Mark McManus (actor)
- James MacPherson (actor)
- Nicol Williamson (Actor, Tony Award nominee)

== See also ==
- Hamilton Advertiser
- List of places in South Lanarkshire
- Hamilton United Reformed Church
- Hamilton Circle Railway Line
- National Cycle Route 74
