= Alex Cullen =

Alex Cullen may refer to:

- Alex Cullen (politician)
- Alex Cullen (journalist)
- Alex Cullen (The Bill)

== See also ==
- Alexander Cullen (disambiguation)
