= Alexander Cullen =

Alexander Cullen may refer to:

- Alexander Lamb Cullen (1920–2013), British electrical engineer
- Alexander Cullen (architect) (1892–1963), Scottish architect and town planner
- Alexander Cullen (cricketer) (1889–1922), Scottish first-class cricketer
