= Hannah Brown Mackenzie =

Scottish writer (1862–1906)

- Born: 1862; Hamilton
- Died: July 15, 1906
- Occupation: Writer

Hannah Brown Mackenzie (1862 – July 15, 1906) was a Scottish poet and novelist.

Hannah Brown Mackenzie was born in 1862 in Hamilton, the daughter of John Mackenzie and Georgina Agnes Brown Mackenzie. She was raised in Loch Carron except for a few years when the family lived in Sydney on Cape Breton Island.

She published her first poem, "A Moorland Scene," in the Glasgow Weekly Herald at the age of 14. She worked as a reviewer for the Glasgow Herald and published poems and serialized fiction in publications including The People's Friend, Highland Magazine, Scottish Reformer, Scottish Nights, and The People's Journal. Her novel Crowned Victor: A Story of Strife (1894) is the love story of a nurse in Edinburgh.

Hannah Brown Mackenzie died on 15 July 1906.

== Personal life ==
She married Alexander Welsh.

== Bibliography ==
- Kitty's Cousin, Blackie & Son, London, 1885.
- Worthy of Trust, Blackie & Son, London 1885.
- After Touch of Wedded Hands. 1 vol. London: Oliphant, 1891.
- Crowned Victor: A Story of Strife. 1 vol. London: Oliphant, 1894.
- Hector Macrae: A Modern Story of the West Highlands. 1 vol. London: Simpkin, 1898.
- A Late Repentance, S. W. Partridge & Co., London, 1902.
