= Summerlee Museum of Scottish Industrial Life =

Museum in Coatbridge, Scotland

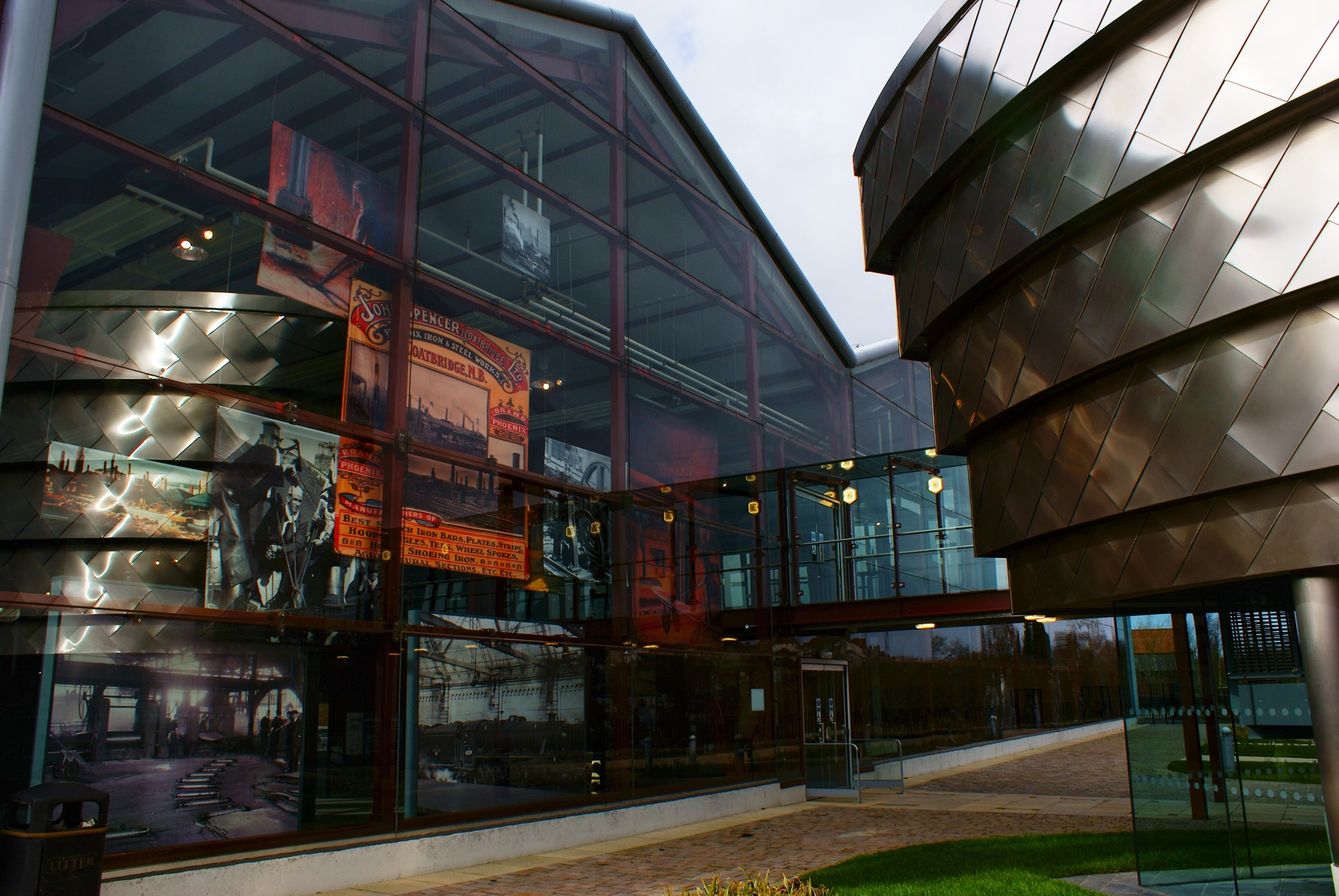
- Museum building
- Interactive map of Summerlee Museum of Scottish Industrial Life
- 55°51′59″N 4°01′51″W
- Location: Summerlee Museum of Scottish Industrial Life, Coatbridge, North Lanarkshire

History
- Built: 1836 (industrial site)
- Original use: Summerlee Iron Works

Site notes
- Area: 22 acres (9 ha)
- Restored: 1988 (museum opening)
- Current use: Site museum
- Governing body: North Lanarkshire Council
- Owner: Industrial Museums Scotland
- Visitors: 180,000 annually
- Website: Go Industrial Sumerlee Museum

Scheduled monument
- Official name: Summerlee Iron Works, furnaces, furnace bank and associated works
- Type: Industrial: iron and steel; kiln, furnace, oven
- Designated: 6 February 1995
- Reference no.: SM6164

Scheduled monument
- Official name: Monkland Canal, Gartsherrie Branch, Summerlee
- Type: Industrial: inland water
- Designated: 16 December 2013
- Reference no.: SM11340

Summerlee Museum of Scottish Industrial Life is an industrial and social history museum in Coatbridge, North Lanarkshire, Scotland. It is situated on the site of the Victorian Summerlee Iron Works and the former Hydrocon Crane factory. The main Hydrocon factory building became the museum's exhibition hall but it has been substantially changed and adapted since. The museum aims to show Lanarkshire's contribution to engineering, mining, steel working, weaving and farming, and also show the lives of the people of the area. It includes interactive displays and a temporary exhibition space. Entry is free of charge.

The museum also incorporates several railway steam locomotives, preserved railway carriages from a 1960s-era Glasgow Class 311 and has a short working heritage tram line.

The museum covers 22 acres (9 hectares) and includes two scheduled monuments, Summerlee Iron Works and the Monkland Canal, a large play area, mine and miners' row, outdoor exhibits, a cafe, changing place, gift shop and sweet shop.

== History ==
Summerlee was one of Scotland's most important ironworks during the 19th century. The site was opened in 1836 by John Neilson of Glasgow's Oakbank Engine Works.

Within three years, Summerlee had four furnaces in blast and by 1842 there was now six. The ironworks continued successfully until after World War I, when following a short period after the Armistice, increasingly scarce resources allied to industrial disputes at the mines, led to the furnaces being destroyed in 1929. Furthermore, the ironworks were demolished in 1938. However, the workshops continued to be used for the maintenance of colliery machinery until 1950.

During the 1960s, a new factory was built on the site to make hydraulic cranes. Following the closure of the crane works, and to preserve and display the industrial and social heritage of West Central Scotland, Summerlee Heritage Trust was established in 1985. The former industrial site was transformed by the group during the late 1980s. Many people helped clear the former site of the Iron Works, including the Gartsherrie Branch of the Monkland Canal, which that had lain derelict for 50 years, and had become silted up.

The area opened as a museum in 1988. Its official name was the Summerlee Heritage Trust. However the museum became known locally as 'Summerlee Heritage Park' or often just 'The Heritage'. Exhibits such as a reconstructed mine, as well as examples of miners' houses were built in 1989. At the same time, a boatshed that had originally being used for Monklands District Council's exhibit during the 1988 Glasgow Garden Festival was relocated to Summerlee Museum.

In 2008, £10million was invested in the site to redevelop it for tourists. When the museum reopened in October 2008, it was renamed as Summerlee Museum of Scottish Industrial Life.

== The Miners' Row ==
Built in 1991–1992, the miners' row, or "raw", shows typical workers' homes from the 1880s to the 1980s. In the row, there is also a sweet shop selling old fashioned sweets. Some of the modern houses have gardens, such as the 1940s house which has a wartime "dig for victory" garden with Anderson shelter. The row is used frequently as a location for filming.

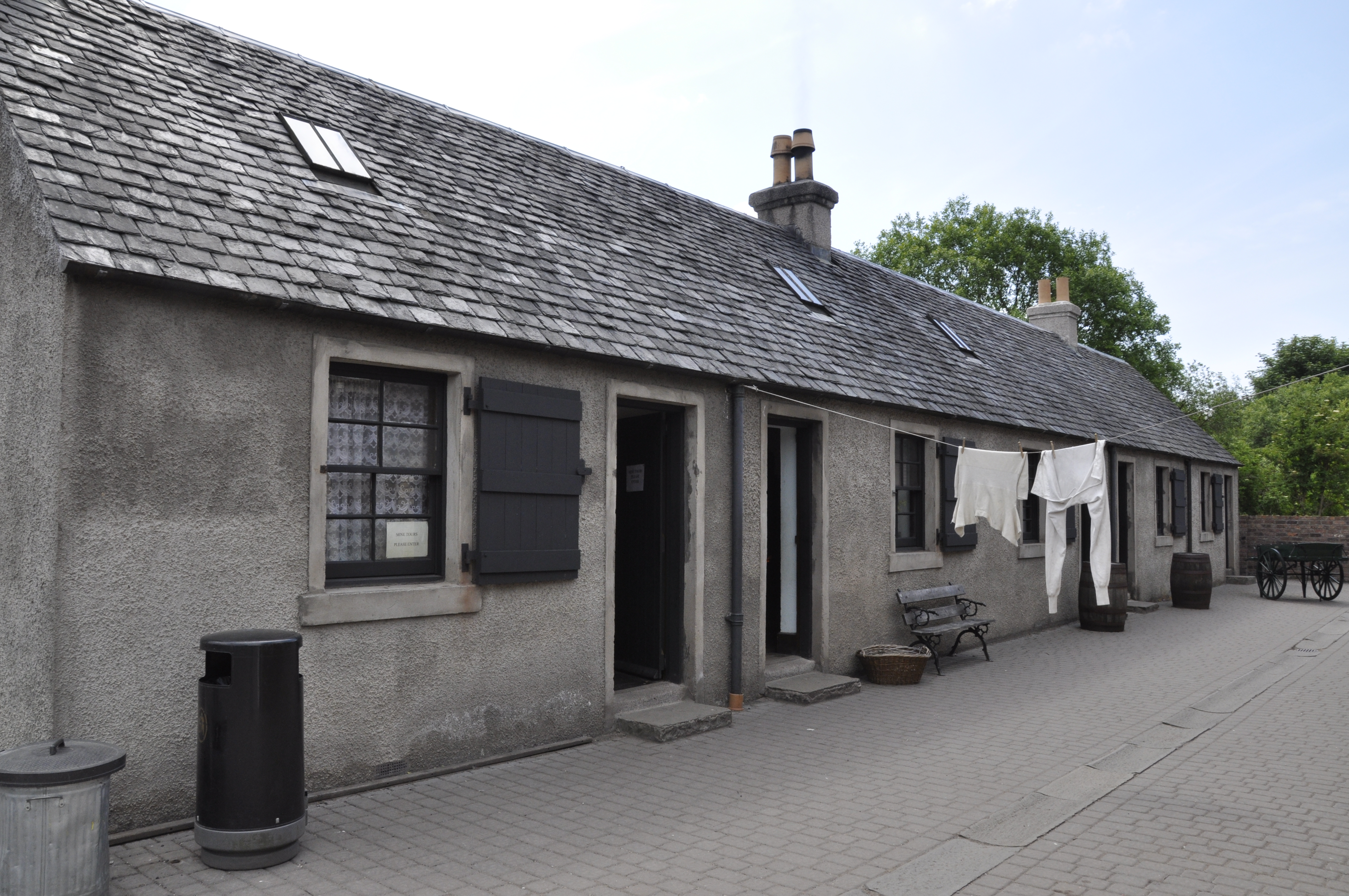
Summerlee Miners' Row 1840 to 1910

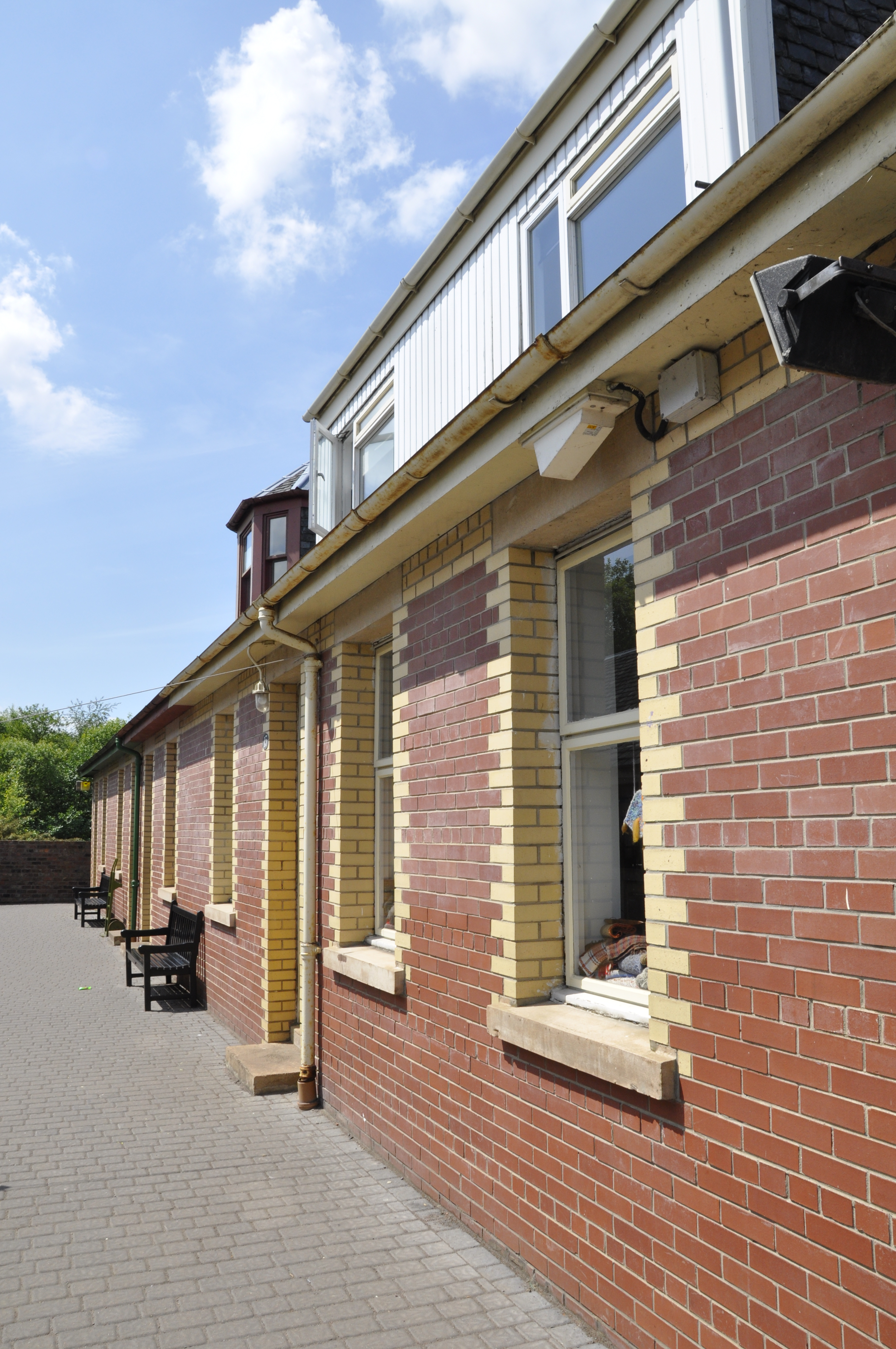
Summerlee Miners' Row 1940 to 1980

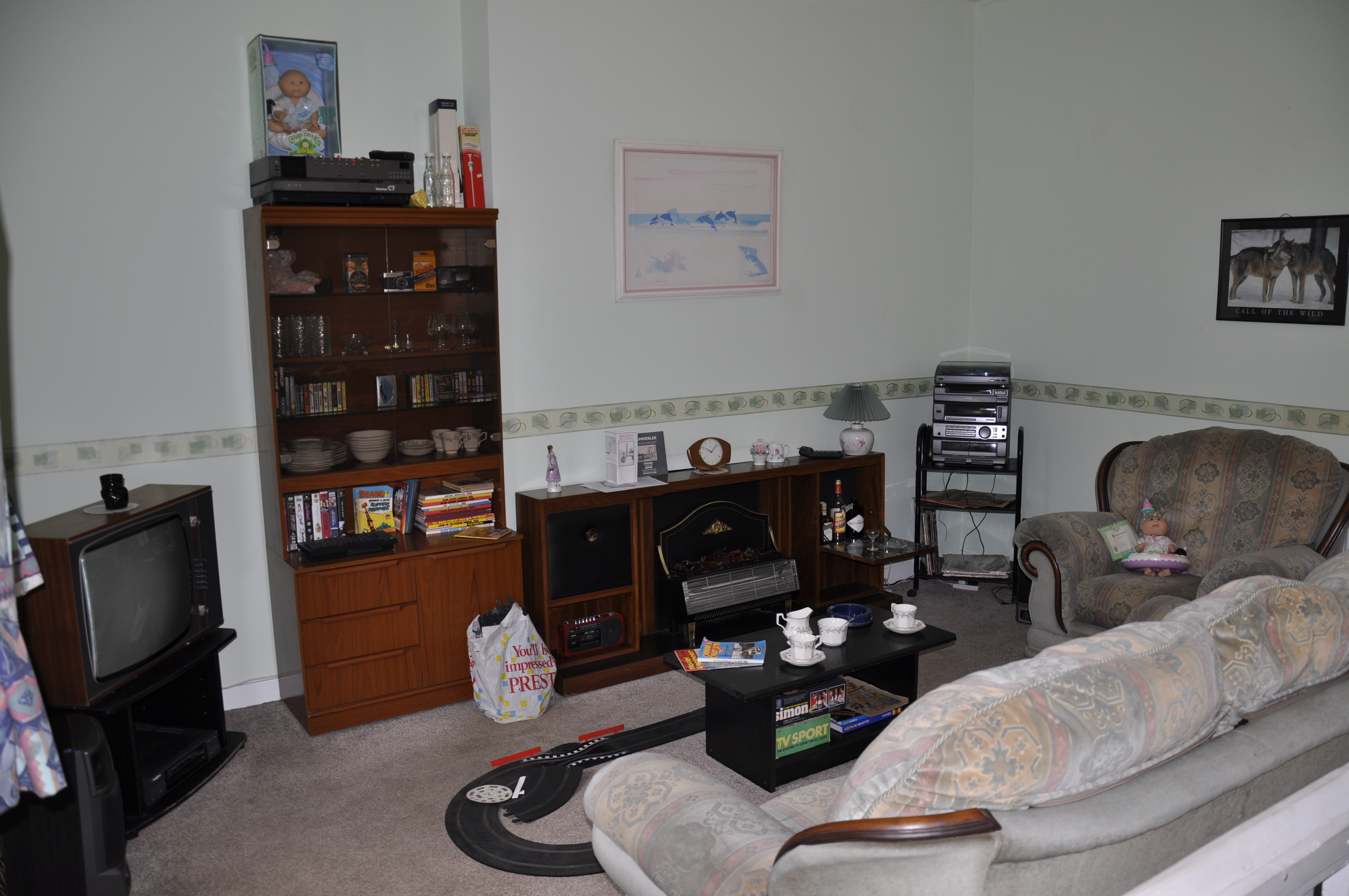
Summerlee Miners' Row 1980s Living Room

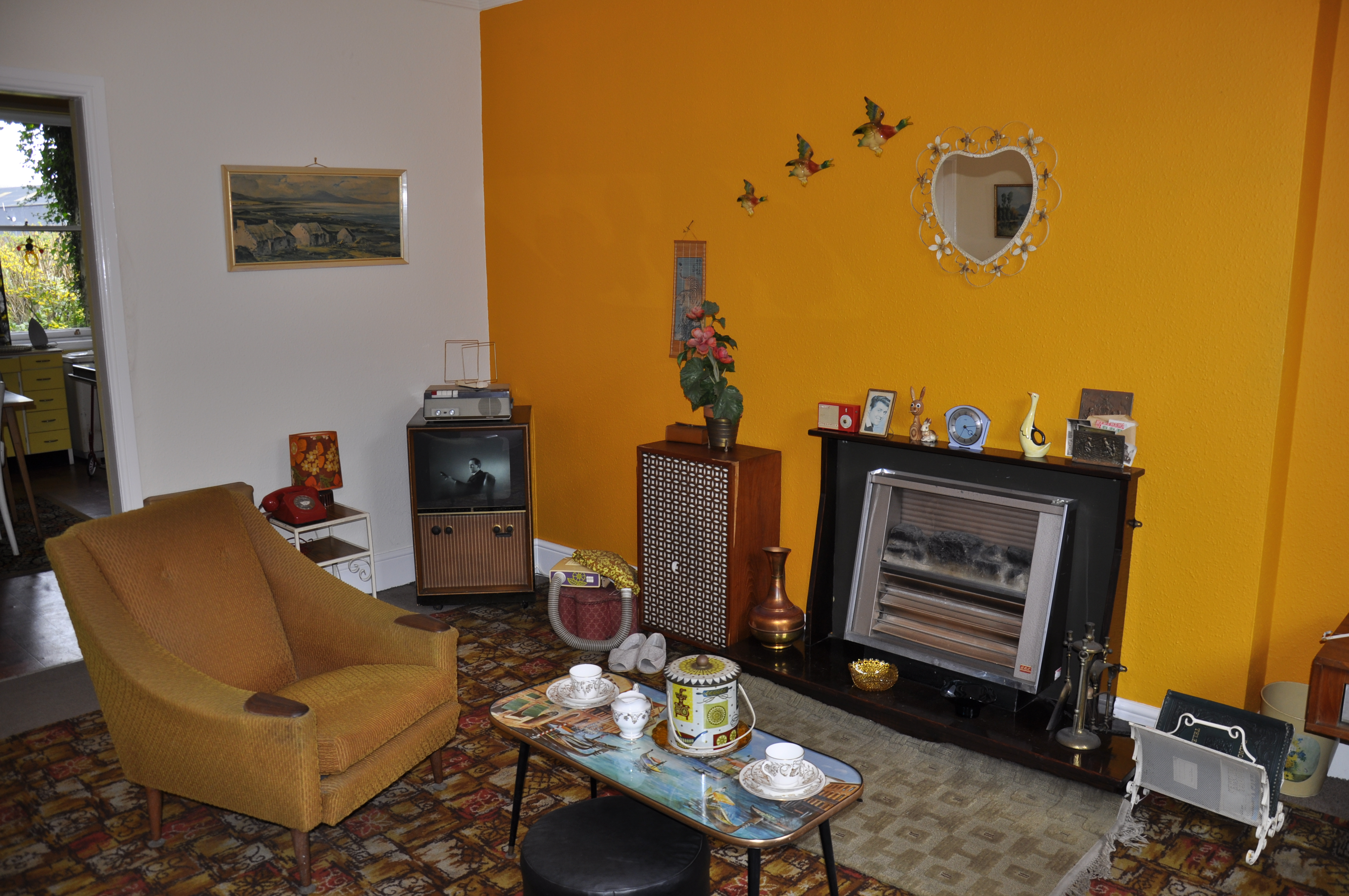
Summerlee Miners Row 1960s Living Room

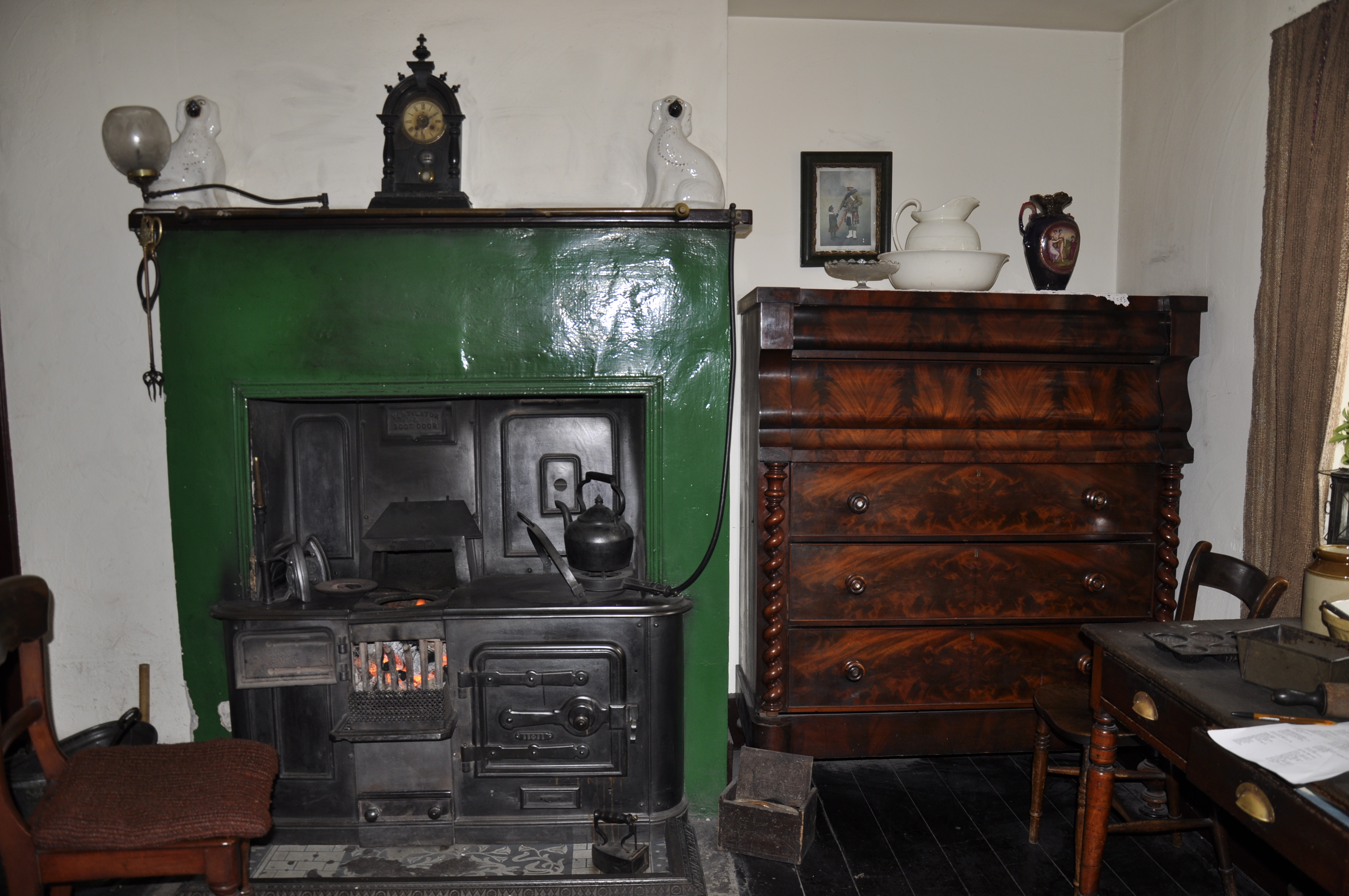
Summerlee Miners' Row 1910

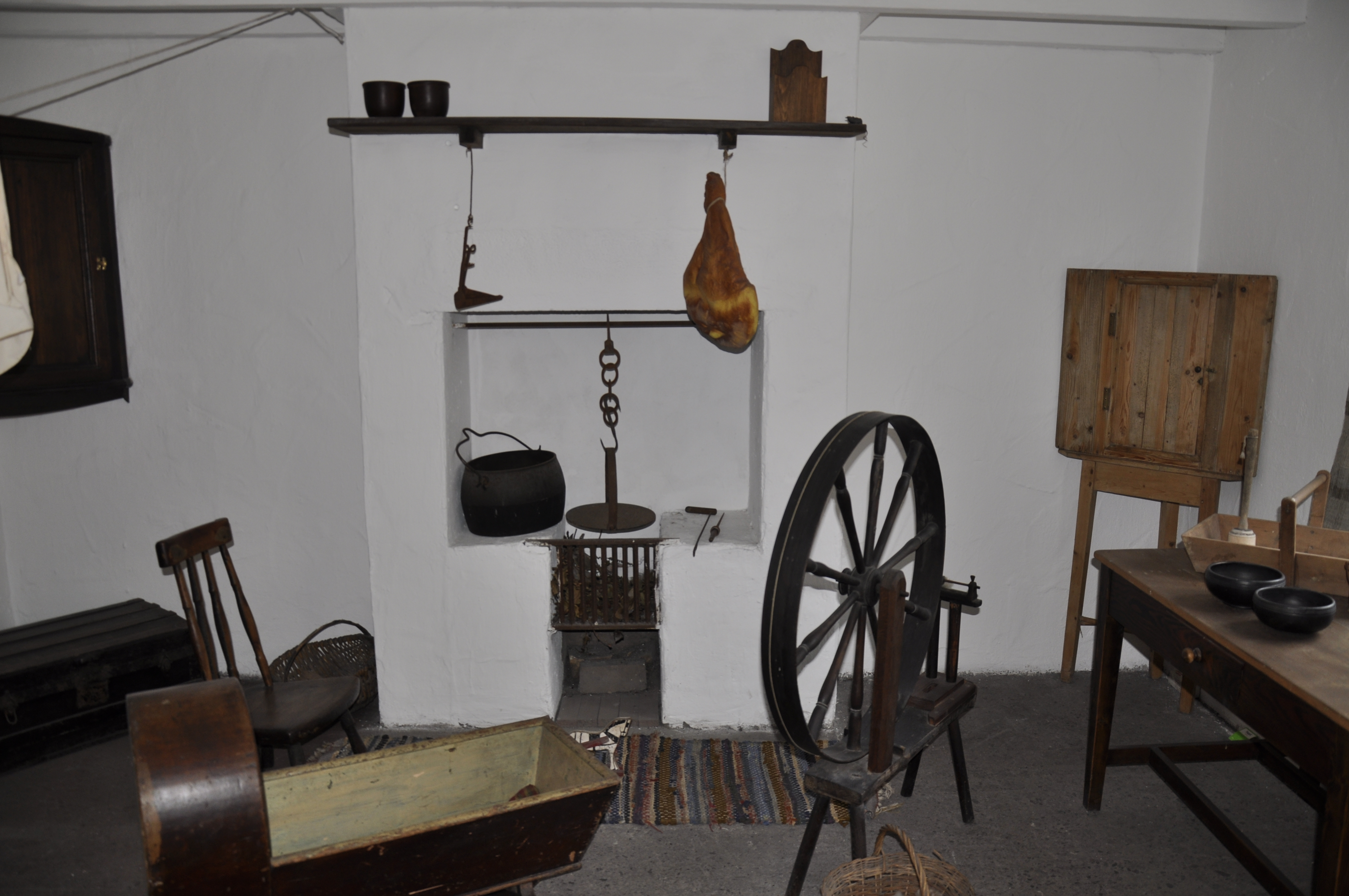
Summerlee Miners Row, 1840

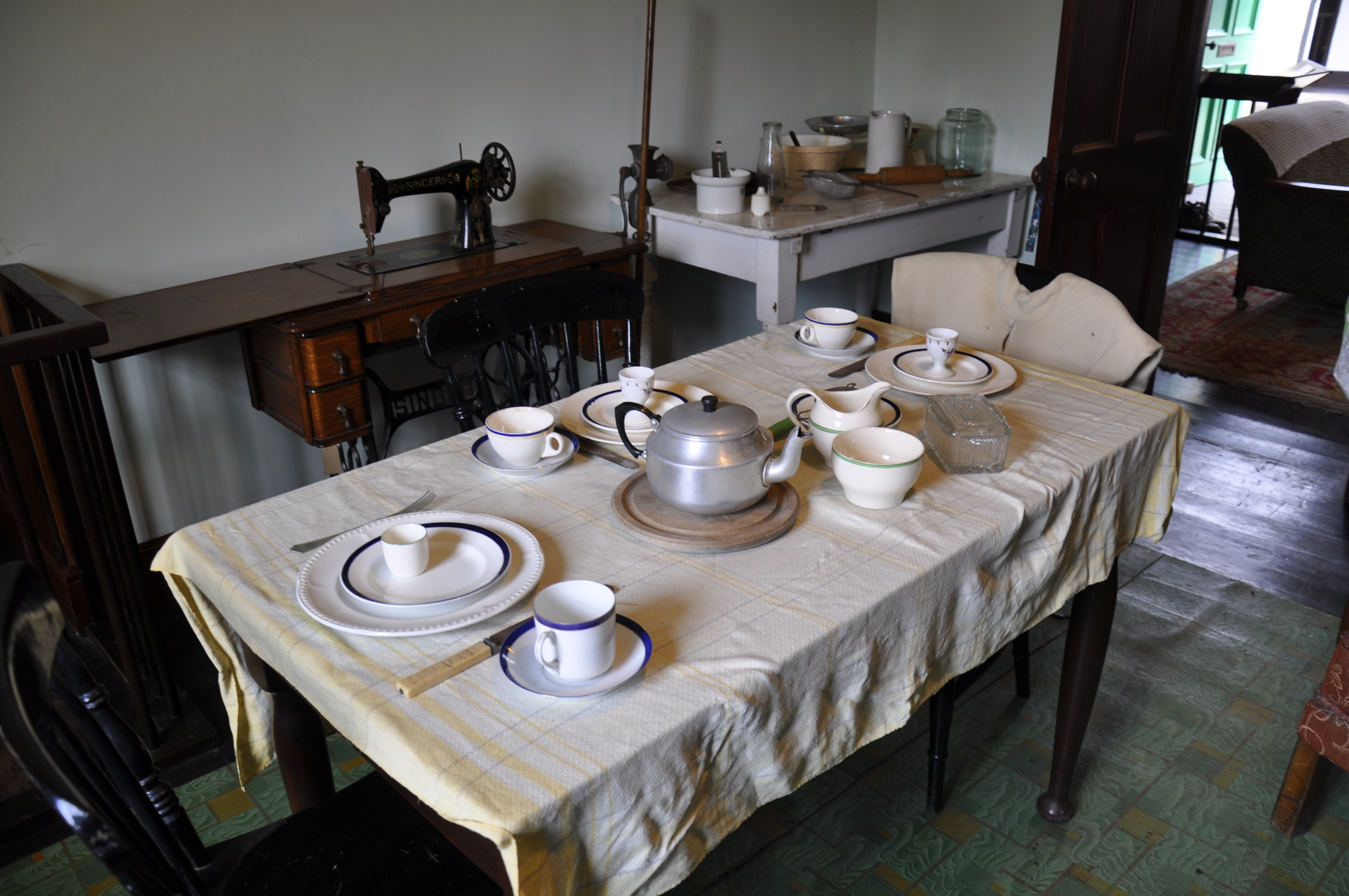
Summerlee Miners Row 1940 kitchen

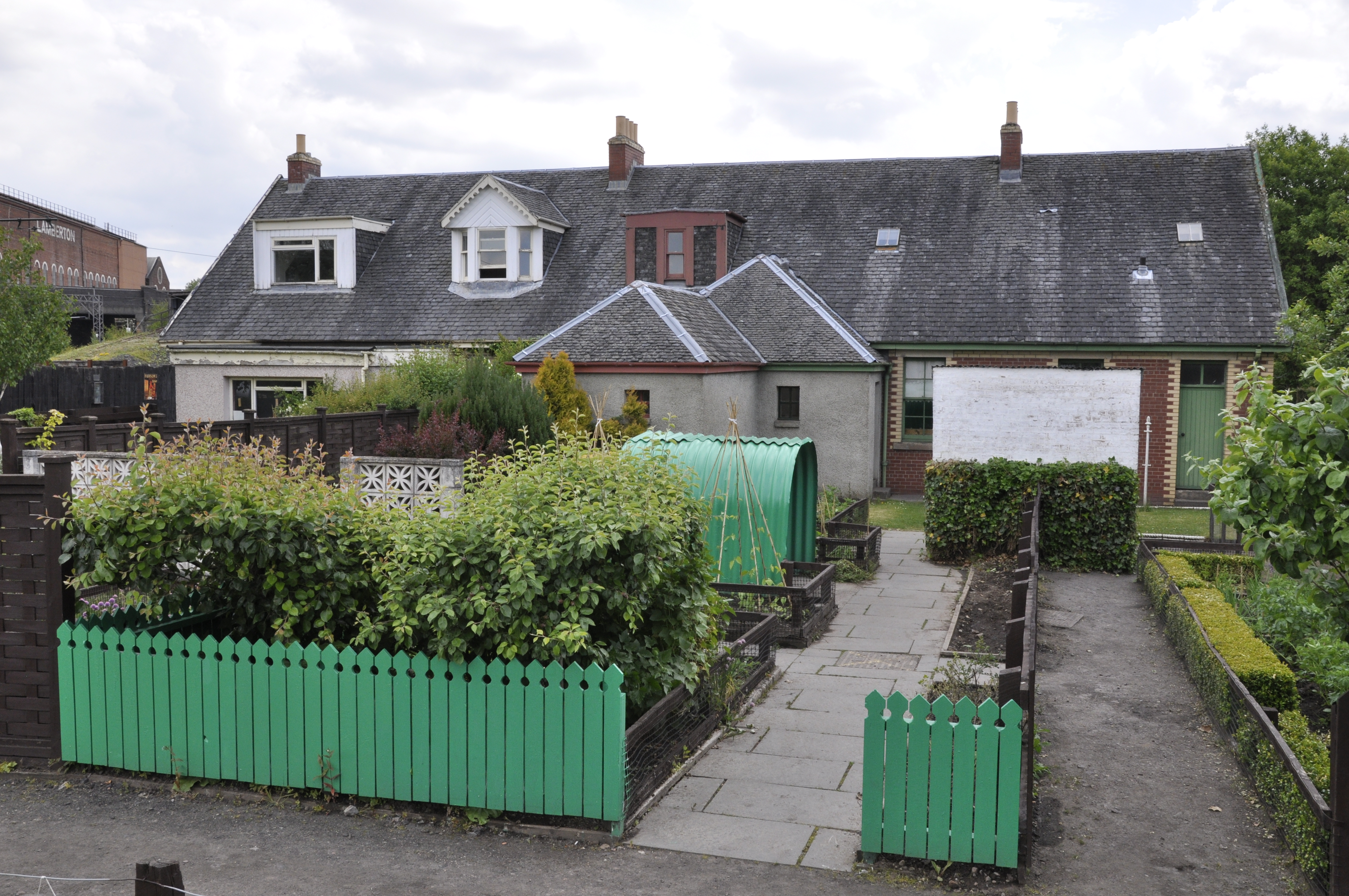
Summerlee Miners Row Gardens

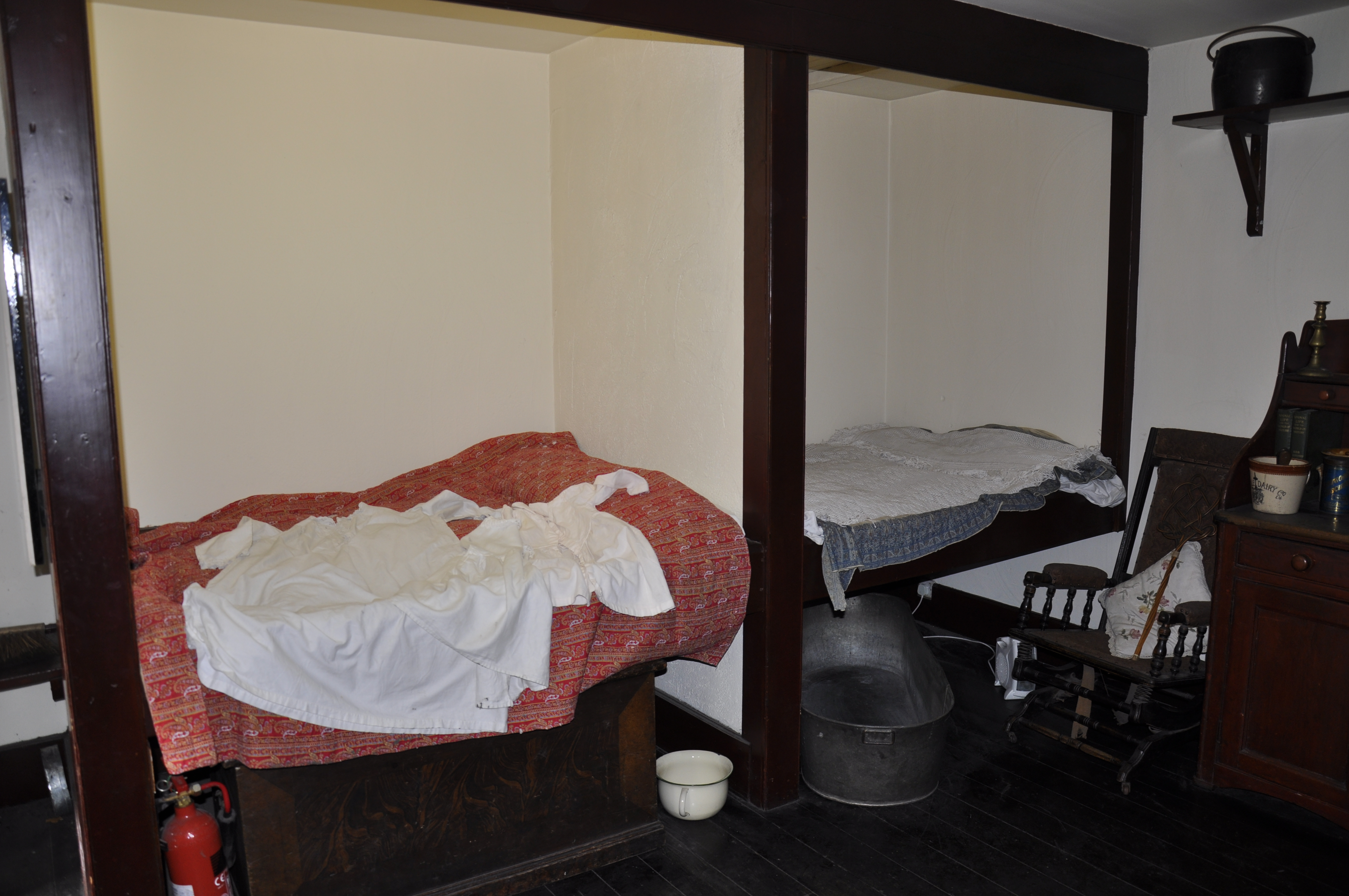
Summerlee Miners Row interior 1880

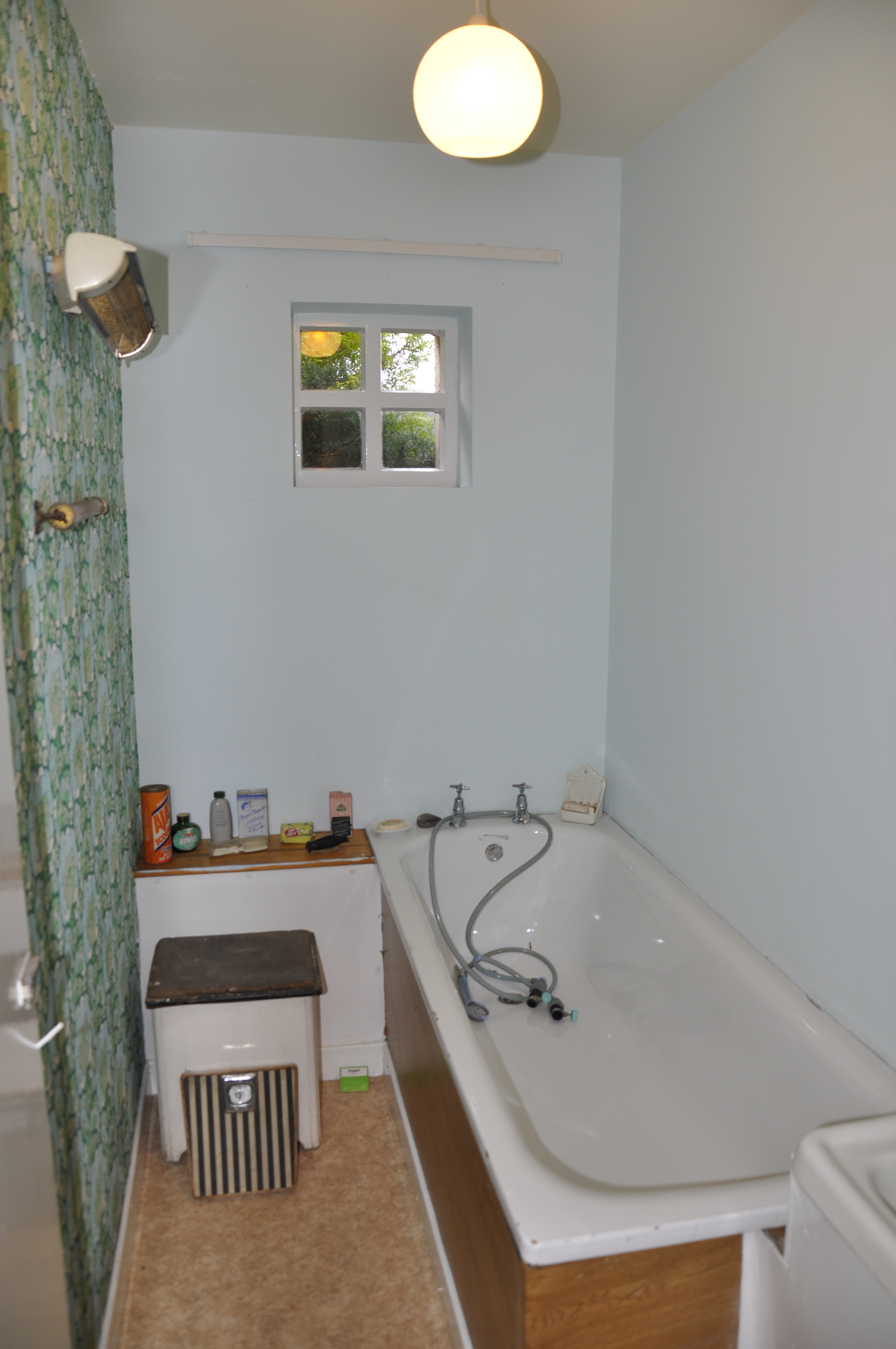
Summerlee Miners' Row 1960s Bathroom

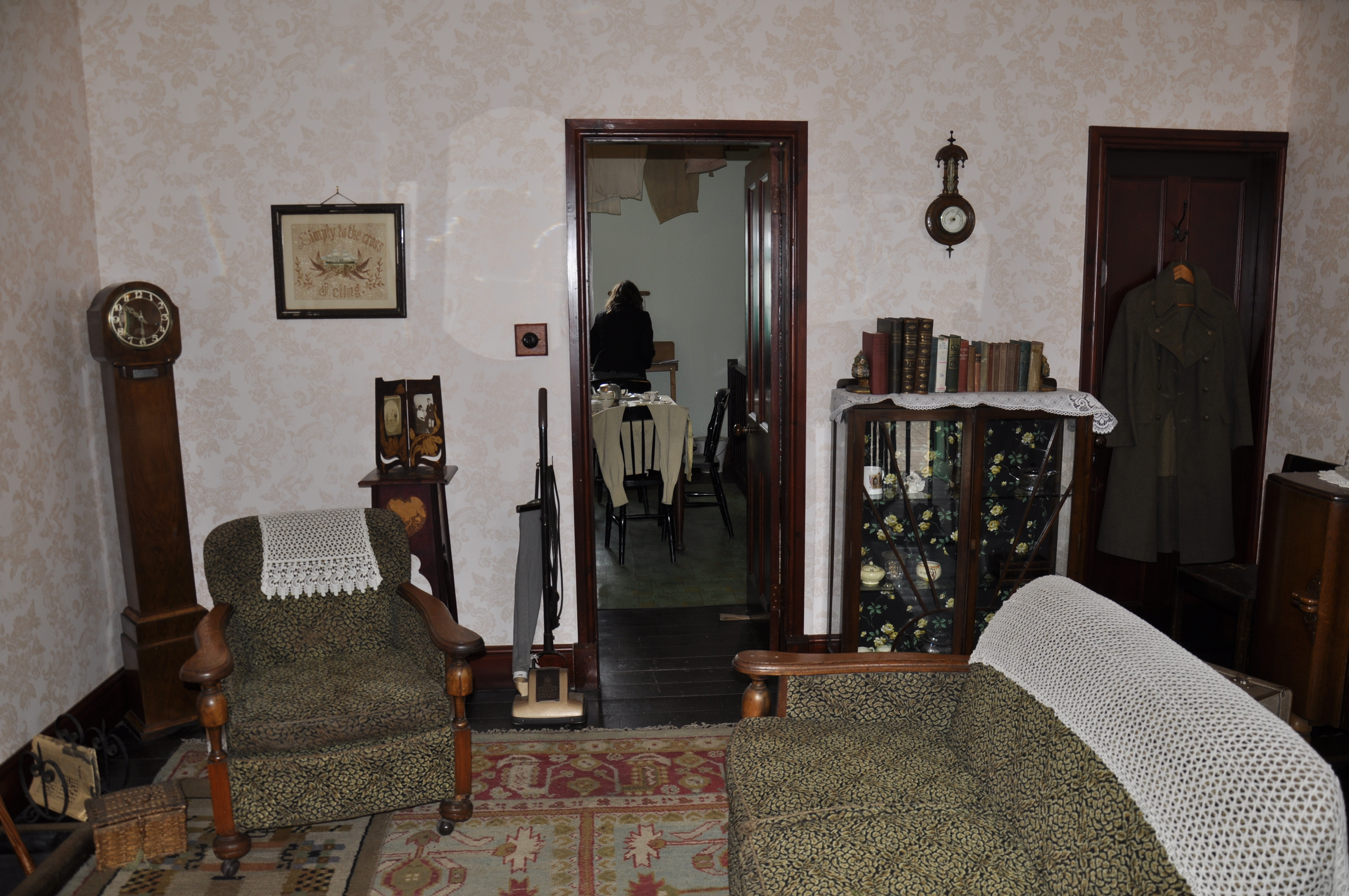
Summerlee Miners' Row 1940s living room

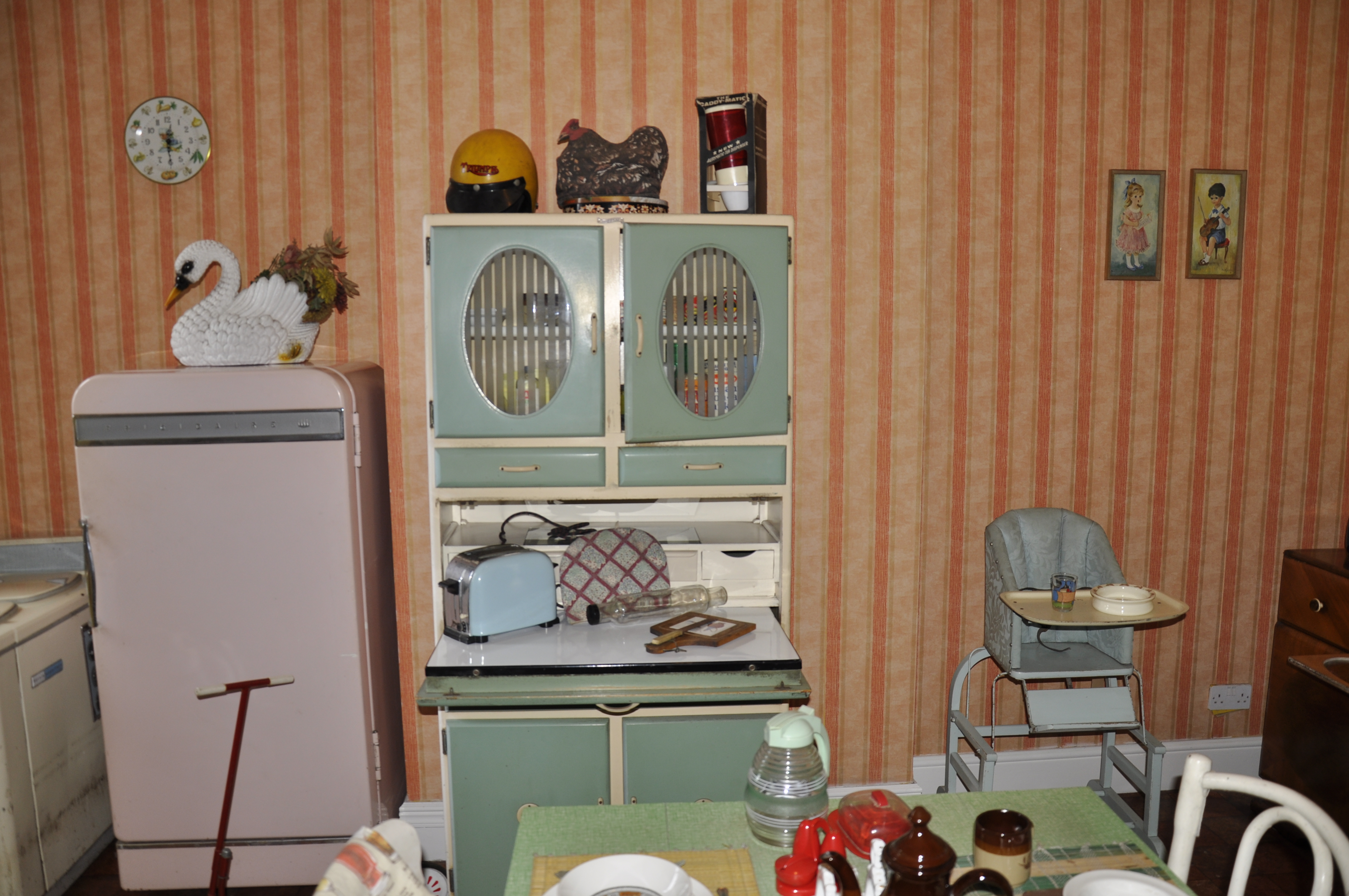
Summerlee Miners Row 1960s Kitchen

== Summerlee Tramway ==
The Summerlee Transport Group (STG) was formed in 1988, in order to support the maintenance and operation of the tramway. The original tramway used to terminate only 300 yards from the entrance at the timber shed, before the extension of the Gartsherrie Branch canal bridge and thence towards the Miners' Cottages. As continued tradition, the cars continued to halt at the timber shed before continuing over the bridge and around the bend.

The tramway opened in 1988 and was the first operational tramway in Scotland for over a quarter of a century, following the closure of the Glasgow Corporation Tramway in 1962, and continued to be the only tramway in Scotland for twenty-six years until Edinburgh reopened its tramway in 2014, apart from the Glasgow Garden Festival Tramway, which opened six weeks after the Summerlee Line.

Whilst the first two operational trams at Summerlee were continental cars - Brussels 9062 and Graz 225 - it has always been the intention to use traditional British cars, preferably with local connections, which is now being realized.

There were also two donor cars on site, which were never operational, purchased for their spare parts:

Oporto 150 was built in 1925 and remained in service there until 1992, when it was purchased by Summerlee for its truck and electrical equipment for Lanarkshire 53 during its restoration. The body was later scrapped.

Lisbon 400-474 was built in 1900-1901 and worked on the system until 1973. The truck was sold to Summerlee in 1995, re-sized and fitted to Glasgow 1017.

Original System	Car number	Built	Date Acquired	Seats	Livery	Status	Notes	Image
Lanarkshire Tramways	53	1908	1988	59	Green and white	Operational	Open-top double-decker often used during busy summer open days. This tram was built in 1908 for Lanarkshire Tramways and she was used on services from Hamilton, Motherwell and Wishaw. In 1917, she was involved in a crash and was not used again in passenger service until 1921 when she was modified and rebuilt. She continued in service until 1931 when the tramway closed. Lanarkshire 53 was then sold to a farmer in Beith, Ayrshire, and was used as a hay store. By 1985, only the lower saloon body remained. Restoration was commenced on the bodywork at the Bo'ness and Kinneil Railway until June 1988, when she came to Summerlee. The truck and running equipment came from Porto 150 (see above), whilst the platforms and upper-deck seats/railings and steps were all made at Summerlee. On 1 April 1995, the tram was launched into passenger service by Helen Liddell MP.	
Düsseldorf	392	1951	1999	10	Cream	Operational	Wheelchair access tram from Germany. Built for Rheinische Bahn Gesellschaft AG (Düsseldorf) in 1951, she was sold to Summerlee Transport Group for DM1 (£0.33). It cost approximately £4,500 to ship her to Coatbridge and a further £3,500 to fit the wheelchair lift. In 2004, the tram was vandalized at the same time as Brussels 9062; however, unlike 9062, 392 was restored and re-entered passenger service in 2010.	
Glasgow Corporation Tramways (Ex. Paisley and District Tramways)	1017 (Ex. Paisley 17)	1904	1992	20	Orange and cream	Operational	Single Decker (ex. Double Decker) - Glasgow "School" Car with raised floor. This car was built in 1904 for Paisley District Tramway as an open-top double-decker and numbered 17. She was temporarily withdrawn from passenger service in 1915 after suffering an accident. She re-entered service in 1917. When Paisley and District Tramways was absorbed by Glasgow Corporation, most of the ex-Paisley cars were converted to single-decker for the Clydebank/Duntocher routes. Renumbered 1017 by Glasgow, this car never ran on those routes, but was instead converted to the "School Car". As part of the conversion of 1017, the sideways bench seats were replaced by a 2+1 transverse arrangement and the floor in the central seating area was raised to allow the trainee drivers better visibility of the controls and the instructing motorman. A frequent sight on Coplaw Street, all tram drivers trained from 1925 to 1959 were trained and passed on Glasgow 1017. As the Glasgow tram system came to wind down, the Motor School closed in 1959. She was then split from her truck and sold for parts: the body was bought by an enthusiast in Cambuslang, who used it as a meeting place for the Scottish Tramway and Transport Society; and the controllers were shipped to the National Tramway Museum in Crich, presumably for use in another vehicle. In 1992, the tram came to Summerlee and underwent a ten-year restoration to its current condition, using the truck from donor vehicle Lisbon 400-474 (see above).	
Glasgow Corporation Tramways	1245	1939	2002	64	Orange, green and cream	Currently undergoing long-term restoration	Coronation Class Tram Built at Coplawhill works by Glasgow Corporation transport and completed on 29 May 1939, 1245 was based at the Parkhead tram depot on Tollcross Road, and ran through Coatbridge on route 23. When this part of the system closed in 1956, it was transferred to city centre service until its withdrawal on 19 June 1962. Its final duty was to shunt other trams waiting to be scrapped until 1963. Later that year, she was moved to East Anglia Transport Museum, and then again to Blackpool Transport's Rigby Road depot in 1998 for storage. She was acquired by Summerlee in 2002, but had to wait until 2011 for restoration to commence, which continues to this day. It is expected that she will be of considerable interest both nationally as the only operational Coronation Tram in the world and locally in view of her service in Coatbridge on route 23.	
Brussels Tramway Network	9062	1959	1988	18	Cream	Scrapped in 2004 after act of vandalism	First operation tram at Summerlee, and first operational tram in Scotland for 26 years. When this tram arrived at Summerlee, she only had a control unit at one end of the car. Unlike British trams, almost all of which were designed to be operated from either end, it is common for European cars to be designed to run on a loop rather than towards dead-end termini, and thus European trams do not require the ability to be driven in either direction. For this reason, this model of tramcar was operated from end one by single man operation, which allowed the driver to collect fares without a conductor aboard; however, a secondary shunting controller was fitted by Summerlee upon arrival before a full controller was installed a few years later. Throughout her time in Scotland, 9062 was a reliable member of the operational fleet at Summerlee; but, as time progressed, and as the restoration of local trams were completed, 9062 found herself used less frequently. She was formally relieved of her duties by the introduction of Glasgow 1017 in 2002 and withdrawn from passenger duties. She remained on site until an act of vandalism in 2004 left her beyond economic repair. The truck, motors, and electrics were sold to the Wirral Transport Museum, Birkenhead for re-use on the Warrington 28; however, a truck from a Crich tram was found to be more suitable. The truck of 9062 still resides in the yard of the Wirral Transport Museum, albeit dismantled and awaiting a future use.	
Graz Tramway Network	225	1949	1989	16	Purple	Sold to the Brighton Tram 53 Society in 2010, but scrapped in 2021	The second stalwart of the early running fleet. Built in 1950, 225 operated in the Austrian city until 1989. Although operated for the majority of her life as a single ended tram, she featured full controls at both ends, which proved a useful feature when imported into Britain. The tram retained her Graz livery of green and white until 2002 when, as part of the celebrations to mark the Queens Golden Jubilee, she was given a special colour scheme of purple and white. Graz 225 enjoyed a reprise to passenger duties following the scrapping of Brussels 9062 in 2004. After performing sterling service in Scotland for many years, Graz 225 was officially retired in 2006 when the Museum closed for refurbishment; it was effectively replaced by Glasgow 1017 when the Museum re-opened in 2008. With limited depot space available, and the museum now in possession of five cars, Graz 225 was placed in outside storage, where she fell into disrepair. In 2010, she was offered for sale to the Brighton Tram 53 Society for use as a site office and ultimately a donor vehicle. Restoration of the Brighton Tram 53 did not progress as quickly as planned; and, by 2018, Graz 225 was still outside and in a derelict condition. The Brighton Tram 53 Society took the difficult decision to scrap the tram in 2021.	

== Railway rolling stock ==
Name	Number	Builder	Type	Date	Works number	Livery	Notes	Image
	11	Gibb and Hogg, Airdrie	0-4-0ST	1898	16	Dark Green	Worked for Fife Coal Company and later N.C.B. Fife area. Later displayed in Pittencrief Park, Dunfermline. Only surviving locomotive from this builder. On display in exhibition hall.	
	9	Hudswell Clarke	0-6-0T	1909	895	Light Green	Worked for Fife Coal company and later N.C.B. Fife area. Open air display alongside mainline railway.	
Springbok	4112	North British Locomotive Co.	4-8-2+2-8-4 Garratt	1956	27770	Black	3 ft 6 in (1,067 mm) gauge South African Railways GMA Class. Repatriated c.1988 by Springburn Museum Trust. Open air display outside exhibition hall. Owned by North Lanarkshire Council.	
Robin		Sentinel	4wVB	1957	9628	Blue	Worked at R.B. Tennants, Whifflet Foundry, Coatbridge. Open air display alongside mainline railway.	
	5	Barclay	0-4-0DH	1966	472	Red	Open air display alongside mainline railway.	

=== Electric Multiple unit ===
Number	Builder	Type	Current status	Date	Livery	Notes	Photograph
Unit 311103 (formed of 62174+76433)	Cravens	BR Class 311	Undergoing restoration.	1966	BR Blue	(76414 scrapped in 2006)	

== Other transport ==
- A replica of the 1819 barge Vulcan, the first all-iron-hulled vessel, built for the Glasgow Garden Festival in 1988. The replica is probably the last hand riveted boat built on the Clyde and was Summerlee Museum and Monklands District Council's entry into the Festival. In 2016, it was re-sited on the Monkland Canal, the Gartsherrie Cut runs through the site, following refurbishment with the aid of Scottish Waterways, Scottish Canals and the Heritage Lottery Fund. It rests on a cradle, slightly proud of the water and is fully accessible for visitors.

== See also ==
- Beamish Museum - an industrial museum in the North East of England
- Black Country Living Museum - an industrial museum in the West Midlands conurbation
- Avoncroft Museum of Historic Buildings in Bromsgrove, West Midlands
- East Anglia Transport Museum - a transport museum in Suffolk
- Riverside Museum
- Titan Clydebank
- Scottish Maritime Museum
- National Tramway Museum - located in Crich, Derbyshire
- The Trolleybus Museum at Sandtoft
- St Fagans National History Museum - Museum of Welsh Life, Cardiff, Wales.
