= Woodhead, Hamilton, Scotland =

Coordinates: 55°45′40″N 4°03′54″W

Woodhead in Hamilton, South Lanarkshire lies south of Little Earnock, and north of Meikle Earnock. There is a pub, The Woodhead, and the main area in Woodhead is Woodhead Green. The houses are largely local authority homes probably around 40–50 years old; about 28% are social housing (rented from the council). There is a frequent bus service from Woodhead to Hamilton bus station and Glasgow.
