= Summerlee Iron Works =

Demolished 19th century iron works

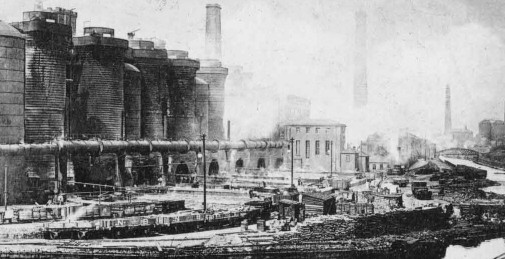
- Summerlee blast furnaces in Coatbridge around 1900
- Location: Summerlee Museum of Scottish Industrial Life, Coatbridge, North Lanarkshire
- Coordinates: 55°51′55″N 4°01′52″W
- Built: 1836
- Demolished: 1938
- Restored: 1985 onwards
- Current use: Site museum
- Owner: Summerlee Museum of Scottish Industrial Life

Scheduled monument
- Official name: Summerlee Iron Works, furnaces, furnace bank and associated works
- Type: Industrial
- Designated: 06/02/1995
- Reference no.: SM6164

The Summerlee Iron Works (1836–1930) was an iron works established in Coatbridge, Scotland. The site has been incorporated into the Summerlee Museum of Scottish Industrial Life.

== History ==
The Summerlee Iron Works was an early adopter of the 'Hot Blast Process', recently patented by James Beaumont Neilson in 1828. This process burned waste furnace gases in regenerative stoves, to heat up a lattice of fire bricks inside them. Once the bricks were sufficiently heated, the waste furnace gases were purged and replaced by fresh air intended to fire the furnaces. The fire bricks transferred their heat to this air, turning it into the 'hot blast' pumped into the furnaces.

No traces of the original small rectangular stoves remain, but foundations of the round Cowper Stoves, that were as tall as the furnaces themselves (20 m) and installed in the 1870s, are visible.

The iron works closed in the early 1930s during the Great Depression and was demolished in 1938. Additional demolition took place in the 1950s during the construction of the Hydrocon crane factory.

== Excavation ==
The site was excavated between 1985 and 1987 by the Manpower Services Commission and again in 2000 by Glasgow University Archaeological Research Division. Four furnace hearths were excavated and are, together with the furnace bank wall, the most notable remains of the iron works.
