= Alexander Cullen (cricketer) =

Scottish cricketer

Personal information
- Full name: Alexander Coney Cullen
- Born: 17 January 1889; Uddingston, Lanarkshire, Scotland
- Died: 25 February 1922 (aged 33); Glasgow, Lanarkshire, Scotland
- Batting: Left-handed
- Bowling: Leg break

Domestic team information
- Years: Team
- 1912–1921: Scotland

Career statistics
Competition	First-class
Matches	4
Runs scored	34
Batting average	6.80
100s/50s	–/–
Top score	11
Balls bowled	60
Wickets	0
Bowling average	–
5 wickets in innings	–
10 wickets in match	–
Best bowling	–
Catches/stumpings	2/–
- Source: Cricinfo, 20 June 2022

Alexander Coney Cullen (17 January 1889 — 25 February 1922) was a Scottish first-class cricketer.

Cullen was born at Uddingston in January 1889. He was educated at both the High School of Glasgow and Stanley House. A club cricketer for Uddingston Cricket Club, Cullen made his debut for Scotland in first-class cricket against the touring South Africans at Glasgow in 1912, with him making two further appearances the following season against Oxford University at Oxford and Surrey at The Oval. Following the First World War, he made a final first-class appearance in 1921 against Ireland at Dublin. In four first-class matches, Cullen scored 34 runs with a highest score of 11, while going wicket-less from 10 overs of leg break bowling across these matches. One of the best-known cricketers in Scotland at the time, Cullen died suddenly at Glasgow on 25 February 1922. Outside of cricket, he was an analytical chemist.
