= William Edward Whyte =

Scottish lawyer

Sir William Edward Whyte FRSE OBE (1875–1950) was a 20th-century Scottish housing and planning lawyer and legal author in these fields.

== Life ==
He was born in Dumbarton in 1875 the son of William Whyte. He was educated at Glasgow Normal School then studied law at Glasgow University.

He joined Lanark County Council and rose to be its chief executive officer (CEO).

In 1935 he was elected a Fellow of the Royal Society of Edinburgh. His proposers were John Wilson, John L. Jack, Francis Albert Eley Crew, and Percy Samuel Lelean. He was knighted by King George V in 1930 for services to local government.

He died on 1 April 1950.

== Family ==
In 1909 he married Jessie Brown Fraser.

== Publications ==
see

- Housing: The Growth of State Interest and What it May Lead To (1920)
- The Law of Housing and Town Planning in Scotland (1920)
- Local Government in Scotland (1925)
- The Local Government (Scotland) Act 1929 (1929)
- Scotland's Housing and Planning Problems (1942)
