= National Cycle Route 74 =

Long-distance cycling route in South Lanarkshire, Scotland

National Cycle Route 74 is a mostly complete (other than a few metres) route between Gretna and Glasgow.

== Route ==
Route 74 begins, branching off from Route 7, a couple of kilometers west of Gretna. (National Route 7 connects Carlisle to Gretna - around 14 km north as the crow flies.)

For much of its length National Route 74 follows the main transport corridor north of Gretna - sharing the general area with the main motorway and West Coast Main Line. North of Abington the railway chooses a different route (via Carstairs Junction), and then north of Lesmahagow and Blackwood the number of urban settlements increases.

From the Hamilton area onward the route is navigating the Greater Glasgow conurbation - marking out a quieter route north–south, touching on Motherwell, and passing through Bothwell and Uddingston, where it ends (joining National Route 75).

Travel into central Glasgow can be achieved on National Route 75. If you turn the other way it'll take you to Edinburgh, although that's a longer trip).

One of the interesting features of this route is the re-purposed south-bound lane of the former dual carriageway B7078 (which was the A74)

The one remaining incomplete section lies just north of Lesmahagow, comprising two road roundabouts and a flyover over the M74. It is possible to negotiate the area on foot, or by cycling on the road to join the next stage of the route.
