= Octave Sneeden =

Scottish engineer and author

Dr Jean Baptiste Octave Sneeden FRSE MIME MITE (1893–1973) was a 20th century Scottish engineer and author. As an author he is sometimes known as J. B. O. Sneeden.

== Life ==
He was born on the island of Mauritius on 24 June 1893. He was the son of John Alexander Elvin Sneeden (b.1868) and his wife Maria Ravinia Georges (b.1872), and paternal grandson of John Townsend Sneeden of Annapolis in Nova Scotia and Maria Louise Georgina Sharrock of Port Louis, Mauritius.

He studied Engineering Science at Glasgow University graduating BSc in 1917. He then immediately joined the staff of Walthamstow Technical College in north east London. In 1920 he moved to the Royal Technical College in Glasgow lecturing firstly on Heat Engines. He later became Head of Mechanical Engineering.

He received a doctorate (PhD) from Glasgow University in 1930. In 1932 he was elected a Fellow of the Royal Society of Edinburgh. His proposers were Herbert Stockdale, Dugald McQuistan, John McWhan and David Ellis.

He died on 2 June 1976 at his home, 39 Kingshouse Avenue in Glasgow.

== Family ==
He married Miss Gillard in Essex.

== Publications ==
- Elements of Steam Power Engineering (1932)
- Introduction to Internal Combustion Engineering (1933)
- Applied Heat for Engineers (1947)
