= 1980 United Kingdom local elections =

- 1 May 1980

All 36 metropolitan boroughs, 103 out of 296 English districts and all 53 Scottish districts
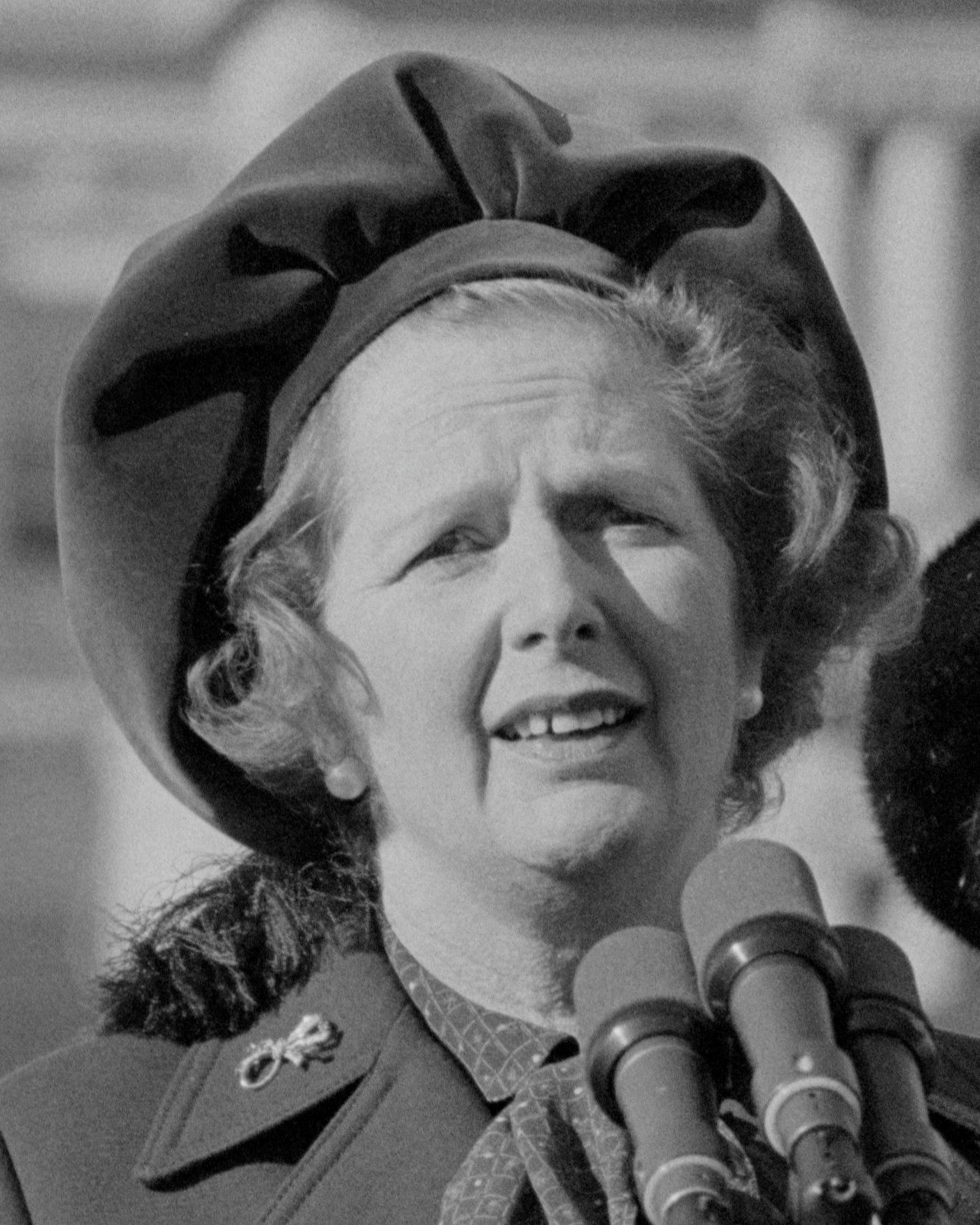

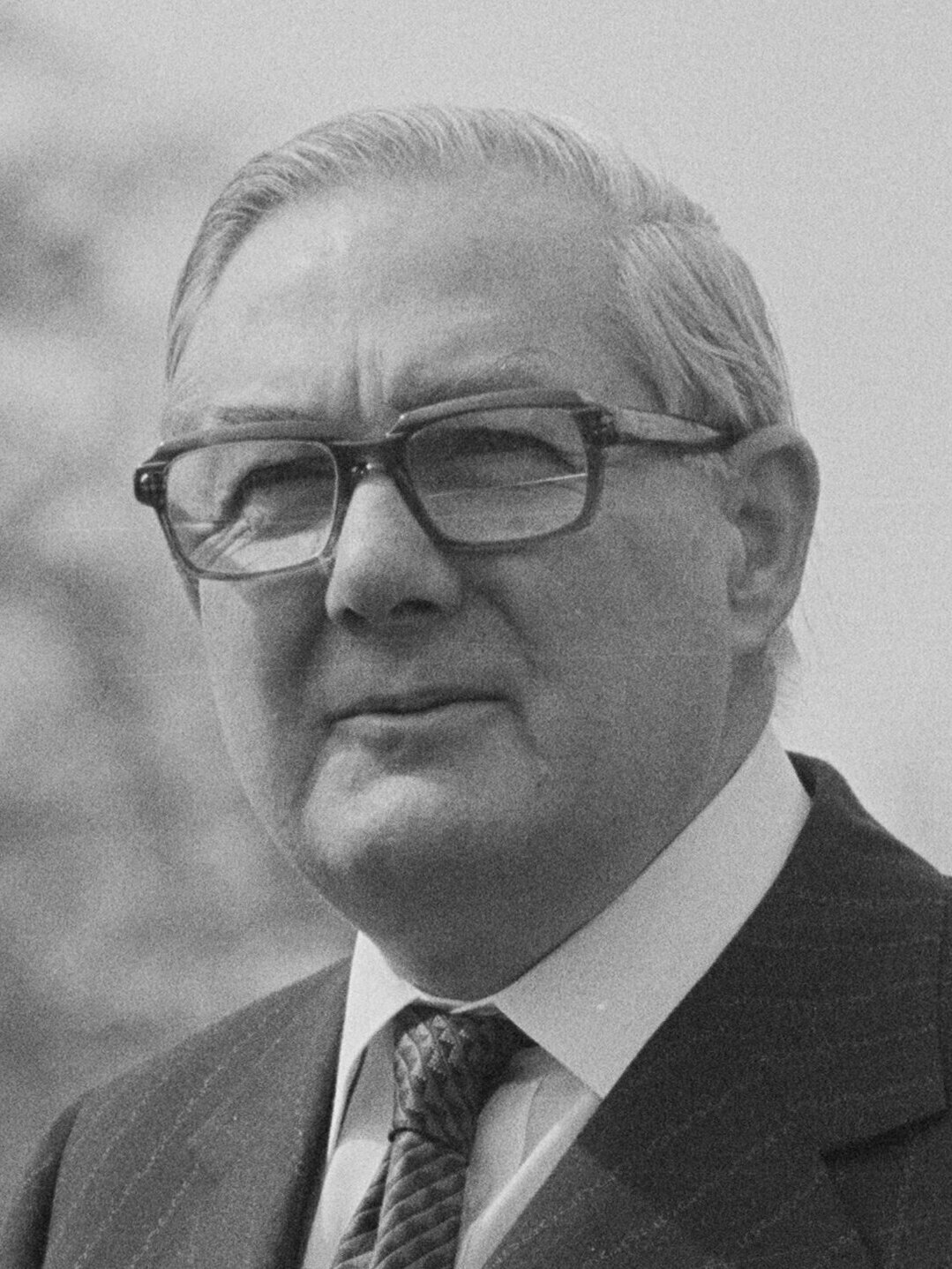

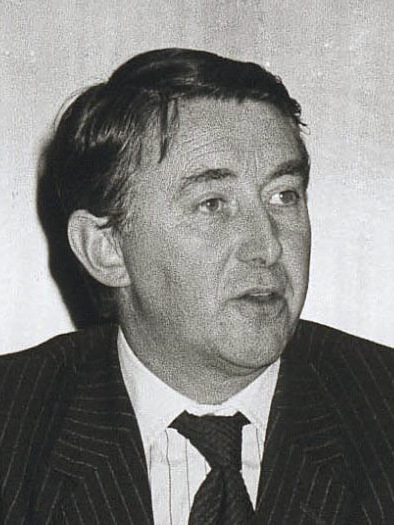
	Majority party	Minority party	Third party
Leader	Margaret Thatcher	James Callaghan	David Steel
Party	Conservative	Labour	Liberal
Leader since	11 February 1975	5 April 1976	7 July 1976
Percentage	40%	42%	13%
Swing	601
Councillors	19,238	8,011	1,149
Councillors +/-	▼484	▲601	▲90

Local elections were held in the United Kingdom in 1980. These were the first annual local elections for the new Conservative Prime Minister Margaret Thatcher. Though the Conservatives in government lost seats, the projected share of the vote was close: Labour Party 42%, Conservative Party 40%, Liberal Party 13%. Labour were still being led by the former prime minister James Callaghan, who resigned later in the year to be succeeded by Michael Foot.

Labour gained 601 seats, bringing their number of councillors to 8,011. The Conservatives lost 484 seats, leaving them with 11,738 councillors. The Liberal Party gained 90 seats and finished with 1,149 councillors.

Changes in control of councils were as follows:

- Labour gain from no overall control: Amber Valley, Birmingham, Kirklees, Leeds, Peterborough, Rochdale, Walsall, Wolverhampton
- Labour gain from Conservative: Bolton, Bradford, Hyndburn, Oldham, Oxford, Preston, Tamworth, Worcester
- Conservative lose to no overall control: Calderdale, Daventry, Dudley, Great Yarmouth, Hastings, Rushmoor, Shrewsbury and Atcham, Weymouth and Portland
- Liberal gain from Conservative: Adur
- Independent gain from no overall control: Mole Valley

== England ==
=== Metropolitan boroughs ===
==== Whole council ====
In 17 metropolitan boroughs the whole council was up for election.

In 17 boroughs there were new ward boundaries, following electoral boundary reviews by the Local Government Boundary Commission for England.

Council	Previous control	Result	Details
Bolton ‡	Conservative	Labour gain	Details
Bradford ‡	Conservative	Labour gain	Details
Calderdale ‡	Conservative	No overall control gain	Details
Coventry ‡	Labour	Labour hold	Details
Doncaster ‡	Labour	Labour hold	Details
Leeds ‡	No overall control	Labour gain	Details
Liverpool ‡	No overall control	No overall control hold	Details
Rochdale ‡	No overall control	Labour gain	Details
Rotherham ‡	Labour	Labour hold	Details
Sheffield ‡	Labour	Labour hold	Details
St Helens ‡	Labour	Labour hold	Details
Stockport ‡	Conservative	Conservative hold	Details
Tameside ‡	Labour	Labour hold	Details
Trafford ‡	Conservative	Conservative hold	Details
Walsall ‡	No overall control	Labour gain	Details
Wigan ‡	Labour	Labour hold	Details
Wirral ‡	Conservative	Conservative hold	Details

‡ New ward boundaries

==== Third of council ====
19 metropolitan borough councils had one third of their seats up for election.

Council	Previous control	Result	Details
Barnsley	Labour	Labour hold	Details
Birmingham	No overall control	Labour gain	Details
Bury	Conservative	Conservative hold	Details
Dudley	Conservative	No overall control gain	Details
Gateshead	Labour	Labour hold	Details
Kirklees	No overall control	Labour gain	Details
Knowsley	Labour	Labour hold	Details
Manchester	Labour	Labour hold	Details
Newcastle upon Tyne	Labour	Labour hold	Details
North Tyneside	Labour	Labour hold	Details
Oldham	Conservative	Labour gain	Details
Salford	Labour	Labour hold	Details
Sandwell	Labour	Labour hold	Details
Sefton	Conservative	Conservative hold	Details
Solihull	Conservative	Conservative hold	Details
South Tyneside	Labour	Labour hold	Details
Sunderland	Labour	Labour hold	Details
Wakefield	Labour	Labour hold	Details
Wolverhampton	No overall control	Labour gain	Details

=== District councils ===
In 103 districts one third of the council was up for election.

A further 59 councils had passed a resolution under section 7 (4) (b) of the Local Government Act 1972, requesting a system of elections by thirds. They could do so because they had had their new ward boundaries introduced at the 1979 elections.

Council	Previous control	Result	Details
Adur	Conservative	Liberal gain	Details
Amber Valley	No overall control	Labour gain	Details
Barrow-in-Furness	Labour	Labour hold	Details
Basildon	No overall control	No overall control hold	Details
Basingstoke and Deane	Conservative	Conservative hold	Details
Bassetlaw	Labour	Labour hold	Details
Bath	Conservative	Conservative hold	Details
Blackburn	No overall control	No overall control hold	Details
Brentwood	Conservative	Conservative hold	Details
Broadland	Conservative	Conservative hold	Details
Broxbourne	Conservative	Conservative hold	Details
Burnley	Labour	Labour hold	Details
Cambridge	No overall control	No overall control hold	Details
Cannock Chase	Labour	Labour hold	Details
Cherwell	Conservative	Conservative hold	Details
Chester	Conservative	Conservative hold	Details
Chorley	Conservative	Conservative hold	Details
Colchester	Conservative	Conservative hold	Details
Congleton	Conservative	Conservative hold	Details
Craven	Conservative	Conservative hold	Details
Crawley	Labour	Labour hold	Details
Crewe and Nantwich	No overall control	No overall control hold	Details
Daventry	Conservative	No overall control gain	Details
Derby	Labour	Labour hold	Details
East Devon	Conservative	Conservative hold	Details
Eastbourne	Conservative	Conservative hold	Details
Eastleigh	Conservative	Conservative hold	Details
Ellesmere Port and Neston	Labour	Labour hold	Details
Elmbridge	Conservative	Conservative hold	Details
Epping Forest	Conservative	Conservative hold	Details
Fareham	Conservative	Conservative hold	Details
Gillingham	Conservative	Conservative hold	Details
Gloucester	Conservative	Conservative hold	Details
Gosport	Conservative	Conservative hold	Details
Great Grimsby	Labour	Labour hold	Details
Great Yarmouth ‡	Conservative	No overall control gain	Details
Halton	Labour	Labour hold	Details
Harlow	Labour	Labour hold	Details
Hart	Conservative	Conservative hold	Details
Hartlepool	Labour	Labour hold	Details
Hastings	Conservative	No overall control gain	Details
Havant	Conservative	Conservative hold	Details
Hereford	No overall control	Liberal gain	Details
Hertsmere	Conservative	Conservative hold	Details
Huntingdon	Conservative	Conservative hold	Details
Hyndburn	Conservative	Labour gain	Details
Ipswich	Labour	Labour hold	Details
Leominster	Independent	Independent hold	Details
Lincoln	Conservative	Conservative hold	Details
Macclesfield	Conservative	Conservative hold	Details
Maidstone	Conservative	Conservative hold	Details
Milton Keynes	Conservative	Conservative hold	Details
Mole Valley	No overall control	Independent gain	Details
Newcastle-under-Lyme	Labour	Labour hold	Details
North Hertfordshire	Conservative	Conservative hold	Details
Norwich	Labour	Labour hold	Details
Nuneaton and Bedworth	Labour	Labour hold	Details
Oadby and Wigston	Conservative	Conservative hold	Details
Oxford	Conservative	Labour gain	Details
Pendle	No overall control	No overall control hold	Details
Penwith	Independent	Independent hold	Details
Peterborough	No overall control	Labour gain	Details
Preston	Conservative	Labour gain	Details
Purbeck	Independent	Independent hold	Details
Reigate and Banstead	Conservative	Conservative hold	Details
Rochford	Conservative	Conservative hold	Details
Rossendale	Conservative	Conservative hold	Details
Rugby	No overall control	No overall control hold	Details
Runnymede	Conservative	Conservative hold	Details
Rushmoor	Conservative	No overall control gain	Details
Scunthorpe	Labour	Labour hold	Details
Shrewsbury and Atcham	Conservative	No overall control gain	Details
South Bedfordshire	Conservative	Conservative hold	Details
South Cambridgeshire	Independent	Independent hold	Details
South Herefordshire	Independent	Independent hold	Details
South Lakeland	No overall control	No overall control hold	Details
Southampton	Conservative	Conservative hold	Details
Southend-on-Sea	Conservative	Conservative hold	Details
St Albans	Conservative	Conservative hold	Details
Stevenage	Labour	Labour hold	Details
Stoke-on-Trent	Labour	Labour hold	Details
Stratford-on-Avon	Conservative	Conservative hold	Details
Swale	Conservative	Conservative hold	Details
Tamworth	Conservative	Labour gain	Details
Tandridge	Conservative	Conservative hold	Details
Thamesdown	Labour	Labour hold	Details
Three Rivers	Conservative	Conservative hold	Details
Thurrock	No overall control	No overall control hold	Details
Tonbridge and Malling	Conservative	Conservative hold	Details
Tunbridge Wells	Conservative	Conservative hold	Details
Watford	Labour	Labour hold	Details
Welwyn Hatfield	Labour	Labour hold	Details
West Lancashire	Conservative	Conservative hold	Details
West Lindsey	No overall control	No overall control hold	Details
West Oxfordshire	No overall control	No overall control hold	Details
Weymouth and Portland	Conservative	No overall control gain	Details
Winchester	Conservative	Conservative hold	Details
Woking	Conservative	Conservative hold	Details
Wokingham	Conservative	Conservative hold	Details
Woodspring	Conservative	Conservative hold	Details
Worcester	Conservative	Labour gain	Details
Wyre Forest	No overall control	No overall control hold	Details
York	Conservative	No overall control gain	Details

‡ New ward boundaries

== Scotland ==
=== District councils ===
Council	Previous control	Result	Details
Aberdeen	No overall control	Labour gain	Details
Angus	Conservative	Conservative hold	Details
Annandale and Eskdale	Independent	Independent hold	Details
Argyll	Independent	Independent hold	Details
Badenoch and Strathspey	Independent	Independent hold	Details
Banff and Buchan	Independent	Independent hold	Details
Bearsden and Milngavie	Conservative	Conservative hold	Details
Berwickshire	Conservative	Conservative hold	Details
Caithness	Independent	Independent hold	Details
Clackmannan	SNP	Labour gain	Details
Clydebank	No overall control	Labour gain	Details
Clydesdale	No overall control	No overall control hold	Details
Cumbernauld and Kilsyth	SNP	Labour gain	Details
Cumnock and Doon Valley	Labour	Labour hold	Details
Cunninghame	No overall control	Labour gain	Details
Dumbarton	No overall control	Labour gain	Details
Dundee	No overall control	Labour gain	Details
Dunfermline	Labour	Labour hold	Details
East Kilbride	No overall control	Labour gain	Details
East Lothian	Labour	Labour hold	Details
Eastwood	Conservative	Conservative hold	Details
Edinburgh	Conservative	No overall control gain	Details
Ettrick and Lauderdale	Independent	Independent hold	Details
Falkirk	SNP	Labour gain	Details
Glasgow	No overall control	Labour gain	Details
Gordon	No overall control	No overall control hold	Details
Hamilton	Labour	Labour hold	Details
Inverclyde	Liberal	Labour gain	Details
Inverness	Independent	Independent hold	Details
Kilmarnock and Loudoun	No overall control	Labour gain	Details
Kincardine and Deeside	Independent	Independent hold	Details
Kirkcaldy	No overall control	Labour gain	Details
Kyle and Carrick	No overall control	Labour gain	Details
Lochaber	Independent	Independent hold	Details
Midlothian	No overall control	Labour gain	Details
Monklands	Labour	Labour hold	Details
Moray	Independent	Independent hold	Details
Motherwell	Labour	Labour hold	Details
Nairn	Independent	Independent hold	Details
Nithsdale	Independent	Independent hold	Details
North East Fife	Conservative	Conservative hold	Details
Perth and Kinross	Conservative	Conservative hold	Details
Renfrew			Details
Ross and Cromarty	Independent	Independent hold	Details
Roxburgh	Independent	Independent hold	Details
Skye and Lochalsh	Independent	Independent hold	Details
Stewartry	Independent	Independent hold	Details
Stirling	No overall control	Labour gain	Details
Strathkelvin	No overall control	Labour gain	Details
Sutherland	Independent	Independent hold	Details
Tweeddale	Independent	Independent hold	Details
West Lothian	No overall control	Labour gain	Details
Wigtown	Independent	Independent hold	Details
