= 1980 Gordon District Council election =

1980 Scottish local government election

← 1977	1 May 1980	1984 →

All 12 seats to Gordon District Council 7 seats needed for a majority
	First party	Second party	Third party
Party	Independent	Conservative	Liberal
Last election	7 seats, 37.9%	3 seats, 26.4%	2 seats, 26.4%
Seats won	6	3	3
Seat change	▼1	0	▲1
Popular vote	1,727	2,089	1,039
Percentage	29.9%	36.2%	18.0%
Swing	▼8.0%	▲9.8%	▼8.4%

Elections to the Gordon District Council took place on 1 May 1980, alongside elections to the councils of Scotland's various other districts.

== Results ==
1980 Gordon District Council election result
Party	Seats	Gains	Losses	Net gain/loss	Seats %	Votes %	Votes	+/−
Independent	6			▼1	50.0	29.9	1,727	▼8.0
Conservative	3			Steady	25.0	36.2	2,089	▲9.8
Liberal	3			▲1	25.0	18.0	1,039	▼8.4
SNP	0	0	0	Steady	0.0	16.0	923	▲6.7
