= 1977 Kincardine and Deeside District Council election =

1977 Scottish local government election

| ← 1974 | 3 May 1977 | 1980 → |

All 12 seats to Kincardine and Deeside District Council 7 seats needed for a majority
| | First party | Second party |
|---|---|---|
| Party | Independent | Conservative |
| Last election | 10 seats, 81.9% | 2 seats, 11.4% |
| Seats won | 10 | 2 |
| Seat change | Steady | Steady |
| Popular vote | 4,427 | 1,004 |
| Percentage | 75.2% | 17.1% |
| Swing | ▼6.7% | ▲5.7% |

Elections to the Kincardine and Deeside District Council took place on 3 May 1977, alongside elections to the councils of Scotland's various other districts. There were 12 single member wards, each electing a single member using the first-past-the-post voting system.

== Results ==
1977 Kincardine and Deeside District Council election result
| Party | Seats | Gains | Losses | Net gain/loss | Seats % | Votes % | Votes | +/− |
|---|---|---|---|---|---|---|---|---|
| Independent | 10 | | | Steady | 83.3 | 75.2 | 4,427 | ▼6.7 |
| Conservative | 2 | | | Steady | 16.7 | 17.1 | 1,004 | ▲5.7 |
| Liberal | 0 | | | Steady | 0.0 | 7.7 | 454 | ▲4.3 |
