= Bearsden and Milngavie =

Former government district in the Strathclyde region of Scotland

Coordinates: 55.941°N 4.319°W

- District
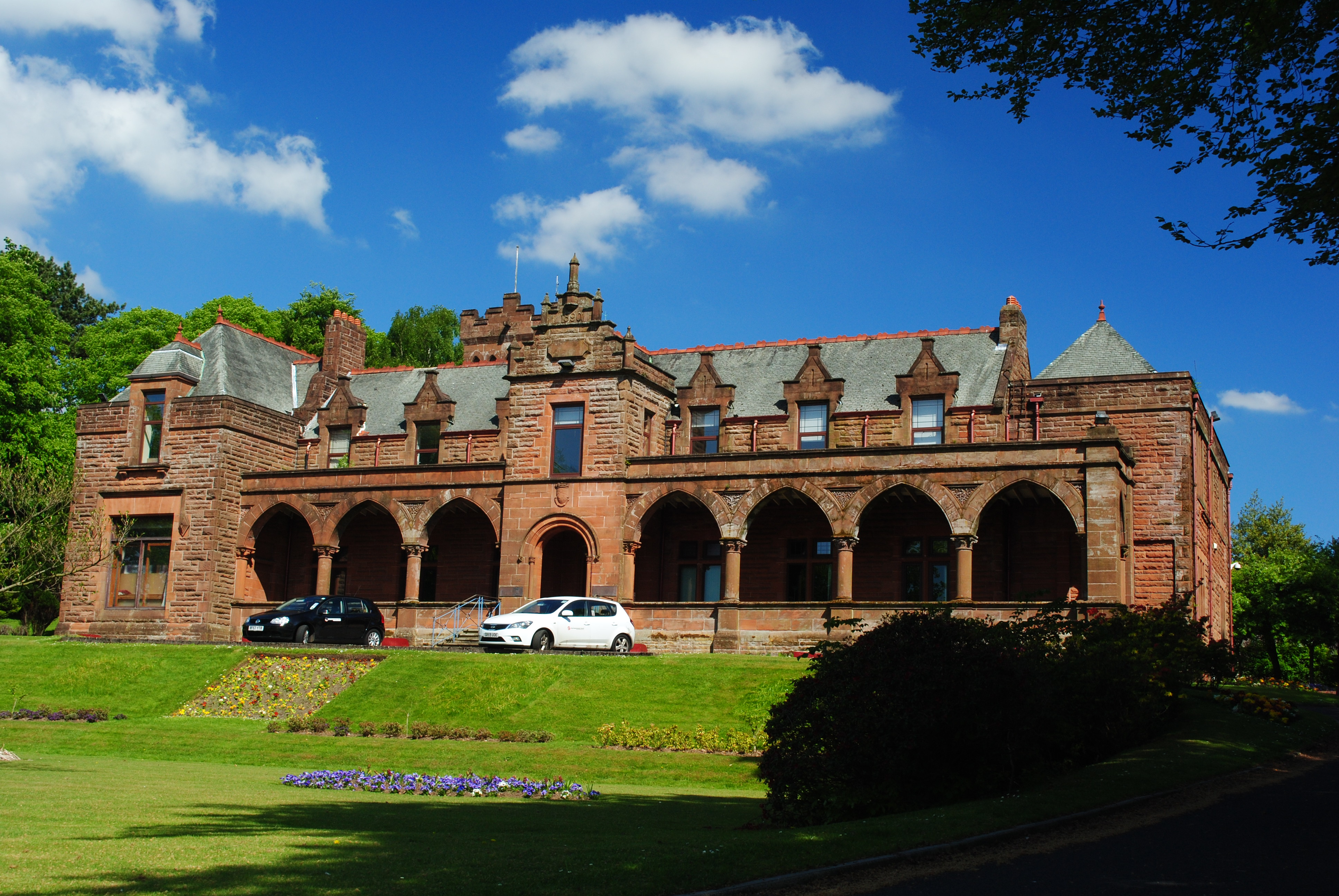
- Boclair, Bearsden: Council's headquarters

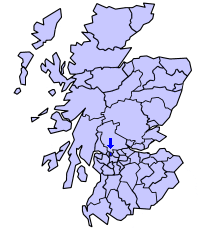
- History
  - Created: 16 May 1975
  - Abolished: 31 March 1996
  - Succeeded by: East Dunbartonshire
- Government: Bearsden and Milngavie District Council
  - HQ: Bearsden

Bearsden and Milngavie (Scottish Gaelic: Cille Phàdraig Ùr agus Muileann Dhaibhidh) was, from 1975 to 1996, one of nineteen local government districts in the Strathclyde region of Scotland, covering an area north of the City of Glasgow.

== History ==
The district was created in 1975 under the Local Government (Scotland) Act 1973, which established a two-tier structure of local government across mainland Scotland comprising upper-tier regions and lower-tier districts. Bearsden and Milngavie was one of nineteen districts created within the region of Strathclyde. The district covered the whole of two former districts and part of a third from the historic county of Dunbartonshire, all of which were abolished at the same time:

- Bearsden Burgh
- Milngavie Burgh
- Old Kilpatrick District: the landward (outside a burgh) part of the parish of New Kilpatrick

The district was abolished in 1996 under the Local Government etc. (Scotland) Act 1994 which replaced regions and districts with unitary council areas. The Bearsden and Milngavie area merged with most of neighbouring Strathkelvin district to become the East Dunbartonshire council area.

== Political control ==
The first election to the district council was held in 1974, initially operating as a shadow authority alongside the outgoing authorities until it came into its powers on 16 May 1975. Political control of the council from 1975 was as follows:

Party in control	Years
No overall control	1975–1977
Conservative	1977–1992
No overall control	1992–1996

=== Elections ===
Elections were held as follows:

Year	Seats	Conservative	Liberal Democrats (Note: Liberals and SDP prior to 1988)	Labour	Independent / Other	Notes
1974	10	5	0	1	4	
1977	10	6	0	1	3	
1980	10	6	0	2	2	
1984	10	6	2	1	1	
1988	10	6	2	1	1	
1992	10	5	4	1	0	

== Premises ==
The council was based at Boclair, 100 Milngavie Road, Bearsden. The building had been built in 1890–1891 as a care home called the Buchanan Retreat. It had then been bought by the old Bearsden Town Council in 1960 and converted into that council's headquarters, being formally opened by Princess Margaret on 31 May 1962. The building passed to the new Bearsden and Milngavie District Council when it was created in 1975 and remained that council's headquarters throughout its existence. On the abolition of Bearsden and Milngavie District Council in 1996 the building passed to the new East Dunbartonshire Council, which initially used the building as additional office space, but established its headquarters in Kirkintilloch. East Dunbartonshire Council subsequently sold Boclair, which has since been converted into a hotel.

== See also ==
- Subdivisions of Scotland
