= 1974 Bishopbriggs and Kirkintilloch District Council election =

Bishopbriggs and Kirkintilloch District Council election

7 May 1974	1977 →

All 14 seats to Bishopbriggs and Kirkintilloch District Council 8 seats needed for a majority
	First party	Second party
Party	Labour	Conservative
Seats won	6	5
Popular vote	11,530	9,571
Percentage	35.3%	29.3%
	Third party	Fourth party
Party	SNP	Independent
Seats won	2	1
Popular vote	7,729	3,131
Percentage	23.7%	9.6%

Elections to Bishopbriggs and Kirkintilloch District Council were held on 7 May 1974, on the same day as the other Scottish local government elections. This was the first election to the district council following the implementation of the Local Government (Scotland) Act 1973.

The election used the 14 wards created by the Formation Electoral Arrangements in 1974. Each ward elected one councillor using first-past-the-post voting.

The council was left in no overall control following the election. Labour were the largest party after they won six of the 14 seats. The Conservatives took five seats while the Scottish National Party (SNP) won two seats.

== Background ==
Prior to 1974, the area that was to become Bishopbriggs and Kirkintilloch, was split between three counties – the County of Lanark, the County of Dunbarton and the County of Stirling. Within that were one of the nine burghs of the County of Lanark (Bishopbriggs) and one of the eight burghs of the County of Dunbarton (Kirkintilloch). These were both small burghs so the burgh council had limited powers which included some control over planning as well as local taxation, building control, housing, lighting and drainage with the rest of the local government responsibility falling to the county council.

Following the recommendations in the Wheatly Report, the old system of counties and burghs – which had resulted in a mishmash of local government areas in which some small burghs had larger populations but far fewer responsibilities than some large burghs and even counties – was to be replaced by a new system of regional and district councils. The Local Government (Scotland) Act 1973 implemented most of the recommendations in the Wheatly Report. The historic County of Dunbarton was separated into two areas with part of the City of Glasgow and the County of Lanark in between. The western part of the eastern area – which included the burgh of Kirkintilloch – was combined with the northern part of the County of Lanark – which included the burgh of Bishopbriggs – and an adjoining area of the County of Stirling and placed into the Bishopbriggs and Kirkintilloch district within the Strathclyde region.

== Results ==
1974 Bishopbriggs and Kirkintilloch District Council election result
Party	Seats	Gains	Losses	Net gain/loss	Seats %	Votes %	Votes	+/−
Labour	6			N/A	42.9	35.3	11,530	N/A
Conservative	5			N/A	35.7	29.3	9,571	N/A
SNP	2			N/A	14.3	23.7	7,729	N/A
Independent	1			N/A	7.1	9.6	3,131	N/A
Liberal	0			N/A	0.0	2.2	704	N/A

== Aftermath ==
Bishopbriggs and Kirkintilloch was one of three districts in the newly created Strathclyde region that was left in no overall control. Labour were the largest party after winning six seats and the Conservatives were the second-largest after they took five seats. The Scottish National Party (SNP) won two seats and one independent candidate was elected. Labour won control of the regional council which held its first election on the same day. Across Scotland, Labour won the most votes, the most seats and the most councils of any party.
