= 1974 Kincardine and Deeside District Council election =

Kincardine and Deeside District Council election

7 May 1974	1977 →

All 12 seats to Kincardine and Deeside District Council 7 seats needed for a majority
	First party	Second party
Party	Independent	Conservative
Seats won	10	2
Popular vote	8,691	1,212
Percentage	81.9%	11.4%

Elections to Kincardine and Deeside District Council were held on 7 May 1974, on the same day as the other Scottish local government elections. This was the first election to the district council following the implementation of the Local Government (Scotland) Act 1973.

The election used the 12 wards created by the Formation Electoral Arrangements in 1974. Each ward elected one councillor using first-past-the-post voting.

Kincardine and Deeside was a non-partisan district. Only a few political party members contested the election and all but two of the 12 seats were won by independents. The remaining two seats were won by the Conservatives.

== Background ==
Prior to 1974, the area that was to become Kincardine and Deeside, was split between two counties – the County of Aberdeen and the County of Kincardine. Within that were one of the 10 burghs of the County of Aberdeen (Ballater) and all four of the burghs of the County of Kincardine (Banchory, Inverbervie, Laurencekirk and Stonehaven). These were all small burghs so the burgh council had limited powers which included some control over planning as well as local taxation, building control, housing, lighting and drainage with the rest of the local government responsibility falling to the county council.

Following the recommendations in the Wheatly Report, the old system of counties and burghs – which had resulted in a mishmash of local government areas in which some small burghs had larger populations but far fewer responsibilities than some large burghs and even counties – was to be replaced by a new system of regional and district councils. The Local Government (Scotland) Act 1973 implemented most of the recommendations in the Wheatly Report. The County of Kincardine which included the four burghs was combined with the southern area including Ballater from the County of Aberdeen and was placed into the Kincardine and Deeside district within the Grampian region.

== Results ==
1974 Kincardine and Deeside District Council election result
Party	Seats	Gains	Losses	Net gain/loss	Seats %	Votes %	Votes	+/−
Independent	10			N/A	83.3	81.9	8,691	N/A
Conservative	2			N/A	16.7	11.4	1,212	N/A
Liberal	0			N/A	0.0	3.4	362	N/A
Independent Labour	0			N/A	0.0	3.2	342	N/A

== Aftermath ==
Kincardine and Deeside, like three of the other districts in Grampian except the City of Aberdeen, was non-partisan and controlled by independent candidates who won all but two of the 12 seats. The remaining two seats were won by the Conservatives. The Conservatives controlled the regional council which held its first election on the same day. Across Scotland, Labour won the most votes, the most seats and the most councils of any party.
