= 1980 Kincardine and Deeside District Council election =

1980 Scottish local government election

← 1977	1 May 1980	1984 →

All 12 seats to Kincardine and Deeside District Council 7 seats needed for a majority
	First party	Second party	Third party
Party	Independent	Conservative	Liberal
Last election	10 seats, 75.2%	2 seats, 17.1%	0 seats, 7.7%
Seats won	9	2	1
Seat change	▼1	0	▲1
Popular vote	4,021	1,222	1,173
Percentage	62.7%	19.0%	18.3%
Swing	▼12.5%	▲1.9%	▲10.6%

Elections to the Kincardine and Deeside District Council took place on 1 May 1980, alongside elections to the councils of Scotland's various other districts. There were 12 single member wards, each electing a single member using the first-past-the-post voting system.

== Results ==
1980 Kincardine and Deeside District Council election result
Party	Seats	Gains	Losses	Net gain/loss	Seats %	Votes %	Votes	+/−
Independent	9			▼1	75.0	62.7	4,021	▼12.5
Conservative	2			Steady	16.7	19.0	1,222	▲1.9
Liberal	1			▲1	8.3	18.3	1,173	▲10.6
