= 1974 Bearsden and Milngavie District Council election =

Bearsden and Milngavie District Council election

7 May 1974	1977 →

All 10 seats to Bearsden and Milngavie District Council 6 seats needed for a majority
	First party	Second party	Third party
	Con	Ind	Lab
Party	Conservative	Independent	Labour
Seats won	5	4	1
Popular vote	8,248	4,778	2,265
Percentage	49.9%	28.9%	13.7%
Council Leader after election
No overall control

Elections to Bearsden and Milngavie District Council were held on 7 May 1974, on the same day as the other Scottish local government elections. This was the first election to the district council following the implementation of the Local Government (Scotland) Act 1973.

The election used the 10 wards created by the Formation Electoral Arrangements in 1974. Each ward elected one councillor using first-past-the-post voting.

The council was left in no overall control after no party won a majority of seats. The Conservatives were the largest party after winning five of the 10 seats. Independent candidates won four seats and the remaining seat was won by Labour.

== Background ==
Prior to 1974, the area that was to become Bearsden and Milngavie, included two of the eight burghs of County of Dunbarton. Both – namely Bearsden and Milngavie – were small burghs so the burgh council had limited powers which included some control over planning as well as local taxation, building control, housing, lighting and drainage with the rest of the local government responsibility falling to the county council.

Following the recommendations in the Wheatly Report, the old system of counties and burghs – which had resulted in a mishmash of local government areas in which some small burghs had larger populations but far fewer responsibilities than some large burghs and even counties – was to be replaced by a new system of regional and district councils. The Local Government (Scotland) Act 1973 implemented most of the recommendations in the Wheatly Report. The historic County of Dunbarton was separated into two areas with part of the City of Glasgow and the County of Lanark in between. The eastern part of the western area – which included the two burghs – was placed into the Bearsden and Milngavie district within the Strathclyde region.

== Results ==
1974 Bearsden and Milngavie District Council election result
Party	Seats	Gains	Losses	Net gain/loss	Seats %	Votes %	Votes	+/−
Conservative	5			N/A	50.0	49.9	8,248	N/A
Independent	4			N/A	40.0	28.9	4,778	N/A
Labour	1			N/A	10.0	13.7	2,265	N/A
Liberal	0			N/A	0.0	7.5	1,246	N/A

== Aftermath ==
Bearsden and Milngavie was one of three districts in the newly created Strathclyde region that was left in no overall control following the election. The Conservatives took the most seats after winning five and Independent candidates won four seats. The remaining seat was won by Labour. Labour also won control of the regional council which held its first election on the same day. Across Scotland, Labour won the most votes, the most seats and the most councils of any party.
