= 1980 Badenoch and Strathspey District Council election =

1980 Scottish local government election

← 1977	1 May 1980	1984 →

All 10 seats to Badenoch and Strathspey District Council 6 seats needed for a majority
	First party
Party	Independent
Seats won	10
Seat change	0
Popular vote	1,259
Percentage	100.0%
Swing	0.0%
Council Control before election
Independent
Council Control after election
Independent

Elections to the Badenoch and Strathspey District Council took place in May 1980, alongside elections to the councils of Scotland's other districts.

== Aggregate results ==
Badenoch and Strathspey District Election Result 1980
Party	Seats	Gains	Losses	Net gain/loss	Seats %	Votes %	Votes	+/−
Independent	10	0	0	0	100.0	100.0	1,259	0.0
