= 1980 East Lothian District Council election =

1980 Scottish local government election

The 1980 East Lothian District Council election for the East Lothian Council took place in May 1980, alongside elections to the councils of Scotland's various other districts.

== Ward results ==
=== Labour ===
- Musselburgh 1
- Musselburgh 2
- Musselburgh 3
- Musselburgh 4
- Tranent
- Ormiston
- Inveresk
- Prestonpans
- Preston
- Gladsmuir

=== Conservative ===
- Cockenzie
- Haddington
- Lammermuir
- Direleton
- Dunbar
- East Linton
- North Berwick
