= 1977 Caithness District Council election =

1977 Scottish local government election

← 1974	7 May 1977	1980 →

All 15 seats to Caithness District Council 8 seats needed for a majority
	First party
Party	Independent
Seats won	15
Seat change	▼1
Popular vote	5,367
Percentage	96.6%
Swing	▲2.0%
Council Convener before election
John Young
Independent
Council Convener after election
John Young
Independent

Elections to the Caithness District Council took place in May 1977, alongside elections to the councils of Scotland's other districts.

== Aggregate results ==
Caithness District Election Result 1977
Party	Seats	Gains	Losses	Net gain/loss	Seats %	Votes %	Votes	+/−
Independent	15			▼1	100.0	96.6	5,367	▲2.0
Conservative	0			0	0.0	3.4	189	New
