= 1980 Eastwood District Council election =

1980 Scottish local government election

The 1980 Eastwood Council election for the Eastwood District Council took place on 1 May 1980, alongside elections to the councils of Scotland's various other districts.

The Conservatives maintained their dominance of the council, winning all but 2 of the Districts seats.

== Aggregate results ==
Eastwood District Council election, 1980
Party	Seats	Gains	Losses	Net gain/loss	Seats %	Votes %	Votes	+/−
Conservative	10	0	0	0				
Ratepayers	2	0	0	0				
Labour	0	0	0	0	0.0			
Liberal	0	0	0	0	0.0			
SNP	0	0	0	0	0.0			
