= 1984 Gordon District Council election =

1984 Scottish local government election

- 3 May 1984

All 12 seats to Gordon District Council 7 seats needed for a majority
	First party	Second party	Third party
Party	Independent	Conservative	Alliance
Last election	6 seats, 29.9%	3 seats, 36.2%	3 seats, 18.0%
Seats won	7	3	2
Seat change	▲1	Steady	▼1
Popular vote	4,889	3,168	2,766
Percentage	44.3%	28.7%	25.1%
Swing	▲14.4%	▼7.5%	▲7.1%

Elections to the Gordon District Council took place on 3 May 1984, alongside elections to the councils of Scotland's various other districts.

== Results ==
1984 Gordon District Council election result
Party	Seats	Gains	Losses	Net gain/loss	Seats %	Votes %	Votes	+/−
Independent	7			▲1	58.3	44.3	4,889	▲14.4
Conservative	3			Steady	25.0	28.7	3,168	▼7.5
Alliance	2			▼1	16.7	25.1	2,766	▲7.1
Labour	0	0	0	Steady	0.0	1.9	204	New
