= 1980 Rochford District Council election =

1980 English local election

- 1 May 1980

12 out of 40 seats to Rochford District Council 21 seats needed for a majority

	First party	Second party	Third party
Party	Conservative	Residents	Labour
Seats won	9	1	2
Seats after	26	5	3
Seat change	▼1	Steady	▲2
Popular vote	6,182	589	2,757
Percentage	53.3%	5.1%	23.8%
Swing	▼3.2%	▲0.5%	▲7.4%
	Fourth party	Fifth party
Party	Liberal	Independent
Seats won	0	0
Seats after	3	3
Seat change	Steady	▼1
Popular vote	1,685	393
Percentage	14.5%	3.4%
Swing	▼0.8%	▼3.8%
Council control before election
Conservative
Council control after election
Conservative

The 1980 Rochford District Council election took place on 1 May 1980 to elect members of Rochford District Council in Essex, England. This was on the same day as other local elections.

== Summary ==
=== Election result ===
1980 Rochford District Council election
Party	This election			Full council			This election		
Party	Seats	Net	Seats %	Other	Total	Total %	Votes	Votes %	+/−
Conservative	9	▼1	75.0	17	26	65.0	6,182	53.3	–3.2
Residents	1	Steady	8.3	4	5	12.5	589	5.1	+0.5
Labour	2	▲2	16.7	1	3	7.5	2,757	23.8	+7.4
Liberal	0	Steady	0.0	3	3	7.5	1,685	14.5	–0.8
Independent	0	▼1	0.0	3	3	7.5	393	3.4	–3.8

== Ward results ==
Incumbent councillors standing for re-election are marked with an asterisk (*).

=== Ashingdon ===
Ashingdon
Party	Candidate	Votes	%	±%
Conservative	T. Fawell	496	54.0	+9.6
Liberal	N. Drayton-Thomas	422	46.0	–9.6
Majority		74	8.0	N/A
Turnout		918	42.0	–35.3
Registered electors		2,186		
Conservative hold		Swing	▲9.6	

=== Downhall ===
Downhall
Party	Candidate	Votes	%	±%
Conservative	R. Stephens	650	67.8	–23.6
Labour	J. Foley	169	17.6	N/A
Liberal	M. Menning	139	14.5	+5.9
Majority		481	50.2	–32.7
Turnout		958	39.0	–6.8
Registered electors		2,459		
Conservative hold				

=== Grange & Rawreth ===
Grange & Rawreth
Party	Candidate	Votes	%	±%
Conservative	N. Blyther	571	43.3	–21.9
Labour	S. Andre	552	41.9	+7.1
Liberal	D. Ward	195	14.8	N/A
Majority		19	1.4	–29.0
Turnout		1,318	35.8	–39.3
Registered electors		3,678		
Conservative hold		Swing	▼14.5	

=== Hawkwell East ===
Hawkwell East
Party	Candidate	Votes	%	±%
Conservative	E. Maton*	681	53.2	–4.1
Labour	D. Weir	599	46.8	N/A
Majority		82	6.4	–8.3
Turnout		1,280	30.5	–46.8
Registered electors		4,208		
Conservative hold				

=== Hawkwell West ===
Hawkwell West
Party	Candidate	Votes	%	±%
Conservative	A. Tate*	602	44.1	–3.2
Residents	N. Finlay	589	43.1	–9.6
Labour	P. Marshall	175	12.8	N/A
Majority		13	1.0	N/A
Turnout		1,366	48.7	–32.6
Registered electors		2,904		
Conservative hold		Swing	▲3.2	

=== Hockley Central ===
Hockley Central
Party	Candidate	Votes	%	±%
Conservative	M. Anderson	418	77.0	+18.8
Liberal	C. Pohl	125	23.0	–18.8
Majority		293	54.0	+37.7
Turnout		543	35.7	–5.5
Registered electors		1,533		
Conservative hold		Swing	▲18.8	

=== Hockley East ===
Hockley East
Party	Candidate	Votes	%	±%
Residents	E. Whitworth*	Unopposed		
Registered electors		3,143		
Residents hold				

=== Hockley West ===
Hockley West
Party	Candidate	Votes	%	±%
Conservative	J. Jones*	549	66.9	–18.3
Liberal	G. Skinner	272	33.1	+18.3
Majority		277	33.7	–36.6
Turnout		821	51.3	+7.3
Registered electors		1,639		
Conservative hold		Swing	▼18.3	

=== Hullbridge Riverside ===
Hullbridge Riverside
Party	Candidate	Votes	%	±%
Labour	T. Madden	555	59.8	N/A
Conservative	R. Moody	373	40.2	–3.9
Majority		182	19.6	N/A
Turnout		928	35.6	–0.9
Registered electors		2,684		
Labour gain from Conservative				

=== Lodge ===
Lodge
Party	Candidate	Votes	%	±%
Conservative	P. Elliott	840	61.2	–11.2
Liberal	K. Saunders	532	38.8	N/A
Majority		308	22.4	N/A
Turnout		1,372	31.8	–46.4
Registered electors		4,312		
Conservative hold				

=== Rayleigh Central ===
Rayleigh Central
Party	Candidate	Votes	%	±%
Conservative	T. Warner	551	47.6	–22.6
Independent	S. Silva*	393	34.0	N/A
Labour	V. Foley	213	18.4	–11.4
Majority		158	13.7	–26.7
Turnout		1,157	42.5	+2.5
Registered electors		2,725		
Conservative gain from Independent				

=== Rochford St Andrews ===
Rochford St Andrews
Party	Candidate	Votes	%	±%
Labour	C. Alger	494	52.3	+17.4
Conservative	D. Mears*	451	47.7	–17.4
Majority		43	4.6	N/A
Turnout		945	37.2	+3.4
Registered electors		2,602		
Labour gain from Conservative		Swing	▲17.4	
