= 1980 Sutherland District Council election =

1980 Scottish local government election

- 1 May 1980

All 14 seats to Sutherland District Council 8 seats needed for a majority
	First party
Party	Independent
Seats won	14
Seat change	0
Popular vote	521
Percentage	100.0%
Swing	0.0%
Council Control before election
Independent
Council Control after election
Independent

Elections to the Sutherland District Council took place in May 1980, alongside elections to the councils of Scotland's other districts.

Only one seat was contested.

== Aggregate results ==
Sutherland District Election Result 1980
Party	Seats	Gains	Losses	Net gain/loss	Seats %	Votes %	Votes	+/−
Independent	14	0	0	0	100.0	100.0	521	0.0
