= 1984 Caithness District Council election =

1984 Scottish local government election

← 1980	3 May 1984	1988 →

All 15 seats to Caithness District Council 9 seats needed for a majority

	First party	Second party
Party	Independent	Liberal
Seats won	14	1
Seat change	▲1	0
Popular vote	1,786	0
Percentage	100.0%	0.0%
Council Convener before election
John Young
Independent
Council Convener after election
John Young
Independent

Elections to the Caithness District Council took place in May 1984, alongside elections to the councils of Scotland's other districts.

Only three seats were contested and one seat received no candidates.

== Aggregate results ==
Caithness District Election Result 1984
Party	Seats	Gains	Losses	Net gain/loss	Seats %	Votes %	Votes	+/−
Independent	14	▲1	0	▲1		100.0	1,786	0.0
Liberal	1	0	0	0		0.0	0	0.0
