= 1980 St Albans City and District Council election =

1980 English local election

The 1980 St Albans City and District Council election took place on 1 May 1980 to elect members of St Albans City and District Council in England. This was on the same day as other local elections.

== Summary ==
1980 St Albans City and District Council election
Party	This election			Full council			This election		
Party	Seats	Net	Seats %	Other	Total	Total %	Votes	Votes %	+/−
Conservative	13	▼6	59.1	24	37	64.9	21,518	49.6	–7.6
Labour	5	▲3	22.7	6	11	19.3	11,653	26.9	+0.5
Liberal	4	▲3	13.6	1	5	8.8	8,298	19.1	+7.4
Independent	1	Steady	4.5	2	3	5.3	1,892	4.4	+0.9
Ind. Conservative	0	Steady	0.0	1	1	1.8	N/A	N/A	–1.2

== Ward results ==
=== Ashley ===
Ashley
Party	Candidate	Votes	%	±%
Liberal	B. Rigby	1,104	49.0	
Conservative	S. Davies*	731	32.4	
Labour	R. Protz	419	18.6	
Majority		373	16.5	
Turnout		2,254	47.5	
Registered electors		4,750		
Liberal gain from Conservative		Swing		

=== Batchwood ===
Batchwood
Party	Candidate	Votes	%	±%
Labour	D. Ramsden	889	46.6	
Conservative	B. Eyles*	623	32.7	
Liberal	L. Coates	395	20.7	
Majority		266	13.9	
Turnout		1,907	39.5	
Registered electors		4,827		
Labour gain from Conservative		Swing		

=== Clarence ===
Clarence
Party	Candidate	Votes	%	±%
Conservative	R. Wheeldon*	1,092	54.0	
Labour	A. Kirby	507	25.1	
Liberal	J. Mason	424	21.0	
Majority		585	28.9	
Turnout		2,023	46.8	
Registered electors		4,319		
Conservative hold		Swing		

=== Colney Heath ===
There is an error for this election result in the source material where the result from London Colney is duplicated in the place of Colney Heath's result. The outcome of the election was a Liberal hold.

=== Cunningham ===
Cunningham
Party	Candidate	Votes	%	±%
Liberal	R. Donald	842	37.3	
Conservative	A. Hill*	736	32.6	
Labour	J. Brown	677	30.0	
Majority		106	4.7	
Turnout		2,255	47.3	
Registered electors		4,772		
Liberal gain from Conservative		Swing		

=== Harpenden East ===
Harpenden East (2 seats due to by-election)
Party	Candidate	Votes	%
Conservative	M. Morrell*	1,150	52.0
Conservative	D. Lloyd	1,127	51.0
Labour	C. Mathews	534	24.2
Liberal	C. Clark	527	23.8
Labour	R. Collins	498	22.5
Turnout		2,211	43.8
Registered electors		5,049	
Conservative hold			
Conservative hold			

=== Harpenden North ===
Harpenden North
Party	Candidate	Votes	%	±%
Conservative	K. Wood*	1,331	59.0	
Labour	H. Holmes	515	22.8	
Liberal	D. Collins	410	18.2	
Majority		816	36.2	
Turnout		2,256	39.4	
Registered electors		5,721		
Conservative hold		Swing		

=== Harpenden South ===
Harpenden South (2 seats due to by-election)
Party	Candidate	Votes	%
Conservative	K. Jenkins*	1,358	57.4
Conservative	K. Nash	1,167	49.4
Independent	L. Freitag	418	17.7
Liberal	P. De Fraitas	365	15.4
Labour	K. Griffin	221	9.3
Labour	J. Ryan	181	7.7
Turnout		2,364	48.0
Registered electors		4,924	
Conservative hold			
Conservative hold			

=== Harpenden West ===
Harpenden West
Party	Candidate	Votes	%	±%
Conservative	T. Tarry*	1,466	69.9	
Liberal	T. Woodhead	432	20.6	
Labour	J. McKrell	199	9.5	
Majority		1,034	49.3	
Turnout		2,097	40.9	
Registered electors		5,123		
Conservative hold		Swing		

=== London Colney ===
London Colney
Party	Candidate	Votes	%	±%
Labour	M. Macmillan	1,185	60.0	
Conservative	J. Smee*	789	40.0	
Majority		396	20.0	
Turnout		1,974	71.9	
Registered electors		2,744		
Labour gain from Conservative		Swing		

=== Marshallwick North ===
Marshallwick North
Party	Candidate	Votes	%	±%
Conservative	M. Pattison	936	51.6	
Liberal	G. Churchard	451	24.9	
Labour	P. Landman	427	23.5	
Majority		485	26.7	
Turnout		1,814	40.8	
Registered electors		4,451		
Conservative hold		Swing		

=== Marshallwick South ===
Marshallwick South
Party	Candidate	Votes	%	±%
Conservative	J. Turner*	1,173	52.7	
Liberal	H. Lowe	697	31.3	
Labour	D. Allan	356	16.0	
Majority		476	21.4	
Turnout		2,226	44.2	
Registered electors		5,033		
Conservative hold		Swing		

=== Park Street ===
Park Street
Party	Candidate	Votes	%
Liberal	J. Griffin	662	39.9
Conservative	D. Allen	633	38.2
Conservative	K. Hill	632	38.1
Liberal	J. Allen	573	34.5
Labour	D. Goodchild	365	22.0
Labour	R. Fricker	291	17.5
Turnout		1,659	39.0
Registered electors		4,254	
Liberal gain from Conservative			
Conservative hold			

=== Redbourn ===
Redbourn
Party	Candidate	Votes	%	±%
Independent	S. Bailey	875	56.0	
Conservative	S. Russell*	688	44.0	
Majority		187	12.0	
Turnout		1,563	34.9	
Registered electors		4,483		
Independent gain from Conservative		Swing		

=== Sopwell ===
Sopwell
Party	Candidate	Votes	%	±%
Labour	D. Carr*	1,058	58.4	
Conservative	K. Davies	538	29.7	
Liberal	G. Woollatt	217	12.0	
Majority		520	28.7	
Turnout		1,813	39.5	
Registered electors		4,585		
Labour hold		Swing		

=== St. Peters ===
St. Peters
Party	Candidate	Votes	%	±%
Labour	P. Fowler	663	35.6	
Conservative	E. Banbury	489	26.3	
Independent	R. Rayment*	391	21.0	
Liberal	P. Thompson	317	17.0	
Majority		174	9.4	
Turnout		1,860	40.5	
Registered electors		4,590		
Labour gain from Independent		Swing		

=== St. Stephens ===
St. Stephens
Party	Candidate	Votes	%	±%
Conservative	A. Nowell*	1,335	57.6	
Labour	K. Morcom	555	24.0	
Liberal	M. Barron	426	18.4	
Majority		780	33.7	
Turnout		2,316	41.2	
Registered electors		5,617		
Conservative hold		Swing		

=== Verulam ===
Verulam
Party	Candidate	Votes	%	±%
Conservative	E. Hewitt*	1,549	72.4	
Labour	D. Partridge	590	27.6	
Majority		959	44.8	
Turnout		2,139	41.6	
Registered electors		5,140		
Conservative hold		Swing		

=== Wheathampstead ===
Wheathampstead
Party	Candidate	Votes	%	±%
Conservative	D. Evans	1,186	54.2	
Liberal	N. Clements	456	20.8	
Labour	A. Latchford	338	15.4	
Independent	S. Whittaker	208	9.5	
Majority		730	33.4	
Turnout		2,188	47.6	
Registered electors		4,600		
Conservative hold		Swing		
