= 1980 Inverness District Council election =

1980 Scottish local government election

← 1977	1 May 1980	1984 →

All 28 seats to Inverness District Council 15 seats needed for a majority

	First party	Second party	Third party
Party	Independent	Labour	Liberal
Seats won	17	8	2
Seat change	▼3	▲4	▲2
Popular vote	5,689	1,838	0
Percentage	70.4%	22.7%	0.0%
Swing	▲7.0%	▲1.1%	New
	Fourth party
Party	SNP
Seats won	1
Seat change	▲1
Popular vote	537
Percentage	6.6%
Swing	▼8.4%
Council Control before election
Independent
Council Control after election
Independent

Elections to the Inverness District Council took place in May 1980, alongside elections to the councils of Scotland's other districts.

== Aggregate results ==
Inverness District Election Result 1980
Party	Seats	Gains	Losses	Net gain/loss	Seats %	Votes %	Votes	+/−
Independent	17			▼3		70.4	5,689	▲7.0
Labour	8			▲4		22.7	1,838	▲1.1
Liberal	2	2	0	▲2		0.0	0	New
SNP	1	1	0	▲1		6.6	537	▼8.4
Fine Gael	0	0	0	0	0.0	0.3	21	New
