= 1980 Caithness District Council election =

1980 Scottish local government election

← 1977	1 May 1980	1984 →

All 16 seats to Caithness District Council 9 seats needed for a majority

	First party	Second party	Third party
Party	Independent	Labour	Liberal
Seats won	13	1	1
Seat change	▼2	▲1	▲1
Popular vote	0	0	0
Percentage	0.0%	0.0%	0.0%
Council Convener before election
John Young
Independent
Council Convener after election
John Young
Independent

Elections to the Caithness District Council took place in May 1980, alongside elections to the councils of Scotland's other districts.

Every single seat went uncontested. The Labour and Liberal parties won their first seats on the council.

== Aggregate results ==
Caithness District Election Result 1980
Party	Seats	Gains	Losses	Net gain/loss	Seats %	Votes %	Votes	+/−
Independent	13			▼2		0.0	0	
Labour	1			▲1		0.0	0	
Liberal	1			▲1		0.0	0	
Uncontested election	1							
