= 1977 Badenoch and Strathspey District Council election =

1977 Scottish local government election

← 1974	7 May 1977	1980 →

All 10 seats to Badenoch and Strathspey District Council 6 seats needed for a majority
	First party
Party	Independent
Last election	10
Seats before	10
Seats won	10
Seat change	0
Popular vote	618
Percentage	100.0%
Swing	0.0%
Council Control before election
Independent
Council Control after election
Independent

Elections to the Badenoch and Strathspey District Council took place in May 1977, alongside elections to the councils of Scotland's other districts.

Only one seat was contested.

== Aggregate results ==
Badenoch and Strathspey District Election Result 1977
Party	Seats	Gains	Losses	Net gain/loss	Seats %	Votes %	Votes	+/−
Independent	10	0	0	0	100.0	100.0	618	0.0
