= 1980 Midlothian District Council election =

1980 Scottish local government election

Results by ward.

Elections to Midlothian District Council were held in May 1980, the same day as the other Scottish local government elections.

== Election results ==
Midlothian local election result 1980
Party	Seats	Gains	Losses	Net gain/loss	Seats %	Votes %	Votes	+/−
Labour	13					52.0	10,985	
Liberal	1					6.3	1,323	
Independent	1					5.0	1,057	
Conservative	0					18.1	3,830	
SNP	0					16.1	3,409	
Communist	0					0.7	153	
Other parties	0					1.7	361	
