= 1980 Hertsmere Borough Council election =

Local election in England

- 1 May 1980

13 out of 39 seats to Hertsmere Borough Council 20 seats needed for a majority
- Registered: 46,961
- Turnout: 42.0% (▼34.8%)

	First party	Second party	Third party
Party	Conservative	Labour	Liberal
Seats won	7	3	3
Seats after	22	12	5
Seat change	▼1	Steady	▲1
Popular vote	9,613	4,936	5,194
Percentage	48.7%	25.0%	26.3%
Swing	▲0.6%	▼11.8%	▲11.2%
- Winner of each seat at the 1980 Hertsmere Borough Council election. Wards in white were not contested.
Control before election
Conservative
Control after election
Conservative

The 1980 Hertsmere Borough Council election took place on 1 May 1980 to elect members of Hertsmere Borough Council in Hertfordshire, England. This was on the same day as other local elections.

== Summary ==
=== Election result ===
1980 Hertsmere Borough Council election
Party	This election				Full council			This election		
Party	Candidates	Seats	Net	Seats %	Other	Total	Total %	Votes	Votes %	+/−
Conservative	{{{candidates}}}	7	▼1	53.8	15	22	56.4	9,613	48.7	+0.6
Labour	{{{candidates}}}	3	Steady	23.1	9	12	30.8	4,936	25.0	–11.8
Liberal	{{{candidates}}}	3	▲1	23.1	2	5	12.8	5,194	26.3	+11.2

== Ward results ==
Incumbent councillors standing for re-election are marked with an asterisk (*). Changes in seats do not take into account by-elections or defections.

=== Aldenham West ===
Aldenham West
Party	Candidate	Votes	%	±%
Conservative	Spratt	1,062	60.8	–2.7
Labour	Ford	401	23.0	+3.6
Liberal	Hurd	284	16.3	–0.8
Majority		661	37.8	–6.3
Turnout		1,747	36.4	–39.1
Registered electors		4,799		
Conservative hold		Swing	▼3.2	

=== Cowley ===
Cowley
Party	Candidate	Votes	%	±%
Labour	Whitby	1,005	79.8	+15.7
Conservative	Lincoln	255	20.2	–15.7
Majority		750	59.6	+31.4
Turnout		1,260	33.8	–38.5
Registered electors		3,728		
Labour hold		Swing	▲15.7	

=== Heath North ===
Heath North
Party	Candidate	Votes	%	±%
Conservative	Franklin*	772	49.6	–13.9
Liberal	L. Hodgson	642	41.3	+14.2
Labour	Theobald	141	9.1	–0.3
Majority		130	8.3	–28.5
Turnout		1,555	44.8	+4.8
Registered electors		3,471		
Conservative hold		Swing	▼14.1	

=== Heath South ===
Heath South
Party	Candidate	Votes	%	±%
Conservative	P. Riches	906	68.9	–4.1
Liberal	Shone	257	19.6	+0.6
Labour	Hoeksma	151	11.5	+3.4
Majority		649	49.3	–4.7
Turnout		1,314	35.9	–11.2
Registered electors		3,660		
Conservative hold		Swing	▼2.6	

=== Hillside ===
Hillside
Party	Candidate	Votes	%	±%
Labour	J. Kentish	825	60.0	+11.3
Conservative	Glover	330	24.0	–13.6
Liberal	Hyams	221	16.1	+2.3
Majority		495	36.0	+24.9
Turnout		1,376	39.4	–36.9
Registered electors		3,492		
Labour hold		Swing	▲12.5	

=== Lyndhurst ===
Lyndhurst
Party	Candidate	Votes	%	±%
Labour	E. Lindsey	865	60.1	+10.0
Conservative	Warren	575	39.9	–10.0
Majority		290	20.2	+20.2
Turnout		1,440	44.6	–34.3
Registered electors		3,229		
Labour gain from Conservative		Swing	▲10.0	

=== Potters Bar Central ===
Potters Bar Central
Party	Candidate	Votes	%	±%
Liberal	J. Hurd*	843	51.7	+13.4
Conservative	Naeyer De	650	39.8	–10.5
Labour	Priest	139	8.5	–2.9
Majority		193	11.9	N/A
Turnout		1,632	53.4	–4.0
Registered electors		3,056		
Liberal hold		Swing	▲12.0	

=== Potters Bar East ===
Potters Bar East
Party	Candidate	Votes	%	±%
Conservative	H. Spratt	1,062	60.8	+1.7
Labour	Ford	401	23.0	–3.8
Liberal	Hurd	284	16.3	+2.2
Majority		661	37.8	+2.8
Turnout		1,747	36.4	–41.7
Registered electors		4,799		
Conservative hold		Swing	▲5.8	

=== Potters Bar North ===
Potters Bar North
Party	Candidate	Votes	%	±%
Conservative	Birch*	1,119	76.1	–5.1
Liberal	P. Shannon	222	15.1	+2.9
Labour	Brown	129	8.8	+2.2
Majority		897	61.0	–8.0
Turnout		1,470	40.4	–6.7
Registered electors		3,639		
Conservative hold		Swing	▼4.0	

=== Potters Bar South ===
Potters Bar South
Party	Candidate	Votes	%	±%
Conservative	Roberts	782	61.2	+1.7
Labour	B. Burness	316	24.7	+0.6
Liberal	Bental	180	14.1	+1.6
Majority		466	36.5	+1.1
Turnout		1,278	42.3	–9.4
Registered electors		3,021		
Conservative hold		Swing	▲0.6	

=== Potters Bar West ===
Potters Bar West
Party	Candidate	Votes	%	±%
Conservative	M. Watts	841	53.9	–2.0
Liberal	Cook	445	28.5	+7.6
Labour	J. McCarthy	275	17.6	–5.6
Majority		396	25.4	–7.3
Turnout		1,561	44.1	–33.7
Registered electors		3,540		
Conservative hold		Swing	▼4.8	

=== St. James East ===
St. James East
Party	Candidate	Votes	%	±%
Liberal	Hillier*	919	58.1	+13.6
Conservative	Dunn	496	31.4	–15.1
Labour	Cook	166	10.5	+1.5
Majority		423	26.7	N/A
Turnout		1,581	51.0	–4.2
Registered electors		3,100		
Liberal hold		Swing	▲14.4	

=== St. James West ===
St. James West
Party	Candidate	Votes	%	±%
Liberal	R. Briggs	897	50.3	+22.2
Conservative	Wagland	763	42.8	–19.2
Labour	Pountney	122	6.8	–3.1
Majority		134	7.5	N/A
Turnout		1,782	52.0	+0.9
Registered electors		3,427		
Liberal gain from Conservative		Swing	▲20.7	
