= 1977 Inverness District Council election =

1977 Scottish local government election

← 1974	7 May 1977	1980 →

All 24 seats to Inverness District Council 13 seats needed for a majority

	First party	Second party
Party	Independent	Labour
Seats won	20	4
Seat change	▲2	▲2
Popular vote	5,742	1,956
Percentage	63.4%	21.6%
Swing	▼13.4%	▲9.9%
Council Control before election
Independent
Council Control after election
Independent

Elections to the Inverness District Council took place in May 1977, alongside elections to the councils of Scotland's other districts.

== Aggregate results ==
Inverness District Election Result 1977
Party	Seats	Gains	Losses	Net gain/loss	Seats %	Votes %	Votes	+/−
Independent	20			▲2		63.4	5,742	▼13.4
Labour	4			▲2		21.6	1,956	▲9.9
SNP	0			0	0.0	15.0	1,354	New
