= 1980 Moray District Council election =

1980 Scottish local government election

- 1 May 1980

All 18 seats to Moray District Council 10 seats needed for a majority
- Turnout: 41.0%
	First party	Second party
Party	Independent	SNP
Last election	15 seats, 78.0%	3 seats, 15.5%
Seats won	15	3
Seat change	Steady	Steady
Popular vote	4,141	2,327
Percentage	64.0%	36.0%
Swing	▼14.0%	▲20.5%
- Council composition following the election

Elections to Banff and Buchan District Council were held on 1 May 1980, on the same day as the other Scottish local government elections. This was the third election to the district council following the implementation of the Local Government (Scotland) Act 1973.

The election used the 18 wards created by the Formation Electoral Arrangements in 1974. Each ward elected one councillor using first-past-the-post voting.

== Background ==
At the previous election in 1977, the Independent group won the most seats on the council, taking 15 to the Scottish National Party (SNP)'s 3.

1977 Moray District council election result
Party	Seats	Vote share
Independent	15	78.0%
SNP	3	15.5%

== Results ==
1980 Moray District Council election result
Party	Seats	Gains	Losses	Net gain/loss	Seats %	Votes %	Votes	+/−
Independent	15	1	1	Steady	83.3	64.0	4,141	▼14.0
SNP	3	1	1	Steady	16.7	36.0	2,327	▲20.5

== Ward results ==
=== Bishopmill ===
Party	Candidate	Votes	%
SNP	A Anderson (Incumbent)	Unopposed	
SNP gain from Independent			

=== Cathedral ===
Party	Candidate	Votes	%
Independent	J Russell (Incumbent)	488	54.3
SNP	A Beattie	409	45.5
Majority		79	8.8
Turnout		898	29.1
Independent hold			

=== New Elgin ===
Party	Candidate	Votes	%
Independent	R Hossack (Incumbent)	Unopposed	
Independent hold			

=== West Central ===
Party	Candidate	Votes	%
Independent	J Stephens (Incumbent)	Unopposed	
Independent hold			

=== Forres ===
Party	Candidate	Votes	%
Independent	A Slorach	Unopposed	
Independent hold			

=== Findhorn Valley ===
Party	Candidate	Votes	%
Independent	R Haim	Unopposed	
Independent hold			

=== Laich ===
Party	Candidate	Votes	%
Independent	D Thompson (Incumbent)	Unopposed	
Independent hold			

=== Lossiemouth ===
Party	Candidate	Votes	%
Independent	J Taylor (Incumbent)	Unopposed	
Independent hold			

=== Heldon ===
Party	Candidate	Votes	%
Independent	J Anderson (Incumbent)	Unopposed	
Independent hold			

=== Innes ===
Party	Candidate	Votes	%
Independent	G Baxter (Incumbent)	Unopposed	
Independent hold			

=== Buckie West ===
Party	Candidate	Votes	%
Independent	J Cole	832	61.9
SNP	H Munro (Incumbent)	509	37.8
Majority		323	24.1
Turnout		1,345	44.6
Independent gain from SNP			

=== Buckie East ===
Party	Candidate	Votes	%
SNP	F Anderson (Incumbent)	902	66.2
Independent	A Wilson	456	33.5
Majority		446	32.7
Turnout		1,362	42.5
SNP hold			

=== Rathford ===
Party	Candidate	Votes	%
Independent	G Innes	827	52.9
Independent	W Mair (Incumbent)	731	46.8
Majority		96	6.1
Turnout		1,563	51.7
Independent hold			

=== Lennox ===
Party	Candidate	Votes	%
SNP	T Howe (Incumbent)	Unopposed	
SNP hold			

=== Keith ===
Party	Candidate	Votes	%
Independent	L Mann (Incumbent)	Unopposed	
Independent hold			

=== Strathisla ===
Party	Candidate	Votes	%
Independent	P Watt (Incumbent)	Unopposed	
Independent hold			

=== Speyside ===
Party	Candidate	Votes	%
Independent	E Aldridge (Incumbent)	Unopposed	
Independent hold			

=== Glenlivet ===
Party	Candidate	Votes	%
Independent	W Marshall	700	53.3
SNP	W Grant	507	38.6
Independent	B Duncan	107	8.1
Majority		193	14.7
Turnout		1,314	47.5
Independent hold			
