= 1980 Banff and Buchan District Council election =

1980 Scottish local government election

- 1 May 1980

All 18 seats to Banff and Buchan District Council 10 seats needed for a majority
- Turnout: 38.3%
| | First party | Second party | Third party |
|---|---|---|---|
| Party | Independent | SNP | Conservative |
| Last election | 17 seats, 75.9% | 1 seat, 17.6% | 0 seats, 3.2% |
| Seats won | 12 | 5 | 1 |
| Seat change | ▼5 | ▲4 | ▲1 |
| Popular vote | 7,883 | 5,022 | 1,862 |
| Percentage | 48.7% | 31.0% | 11.5% |
| Swing | ▼27.2% | ▲13.4% | ▲8.3% |
- Council composition following the election

Elections to Banff and Buchan District Council were held on 1 May 1980, on the same day as the other Scottish local government elections. This was the third election to the district council following the implementation of the Local Government (Scotland) Act 1973.

The election used the 18 wards created by the Formation Electoral Arrangements in 1974. Each ward elected one councillor using first-past-the-post voting.

== Results ==
1980 Banff and Buchan District Council election result
| Party | Seats | Gains | Losses | Net gain/loss | Seats % | Votes % | Votes | +/− |
|---|---|---|---|---|---|---|---|---|
| Independent | 12 | 0 | 5 | ▼5 | 66.7 | 48.7 | 7,883 | ▼27.2 |
| SNP | 5 | 4 | 0 | ▲4 | 27.8 | 31.0 | 5,022 | ▲13.4 |
| Conservative | 1 | 1 | 0 | ▲1 | 5.6 | 11.5 | 1,862 | ▲8.3 |
| Labour | 0 | 0 | 0 | Steady | 0.0 | 8.8 | 1,429 | New |

== Ward results ==
=== Macduff ===
| Party | Candidate | Votes | % |
|---|---|---|---|
| Independent | S Mair (Incumbent) | Unopposed | |
| Independent hold | | | |

=== King Edward-Gamrie ===
| Party | Candidate | Votes | % |
|---|---|---|---|
| Independent | A Smith (Incumbent) | Unopposed | |
| Independent hold | | | |

=== Banff-Hilton ===
| Party | Candidate | Votes | % |
|---|---|---|---|
| Independent | J Reid | 778 | 50.0 |
| Independent | A Gordon (Incumbent) | 609 | 39.1 |
| Independent | J Smith | 168 | 10.8 |
| Majority | | 169 | 10.9 |
| Turnout | | 1,556 | 46.7 |
| Independent hold | | | |

=== Fordyce/Boyndie ===
| Party | Candidate | Votes | % |
|---|---|---|---|
| Independent | J Hay (Incumbent) | Unopposed | |
| Independent hold | | | |

=== Aberchirder ===
| Party | Candidate | Votes | % |
|---|---|---|---|
| Independent | J Shand (Incumbent) | Unopposed | |
| Independent hold | | | |

=== Turriff ===
| Party | Candidate | Votes | % |
|---|---|---|---|
| Independent | S Mair (Incumbent) | 893 | 60.5 |
| Independent | J Dawson | 583 | 39.5 |
| Majority | | 310 | 21.0 |
| Turnout | | 1,477 | 42.3 |
| Independent hold | | | |

=== Deer ===
| Party | Candidate | Votes | % |
|---|---|---|---|
| Independent | W Cruickshank (Incumbent) | 786 | 63.7 |
| Conservative | A Brodie | 268 | 21.7 |
| Independent | G Burnett-Stuart | 178 | 14.4 |
| Majority | | 518 | 42.0 |
| Turnout | | 1,233 | 33.2 |
| Independent hold | | | |

=== Fyvie/Monquhitter ===
| Party | Candidate | Votes | % |
|---|---|---|---|
| Independent | J Gordon (Incumbent) | Unopposed | |
| Independent hold | | | |

=== Meethill/Boddam ===
| Party | Candidate | Votes | % |
|---|---|---|---|
| SNP | S Coull (Incumbent) | 1,161 | 79.6 |
| Conservative | A Taylor | 294 | 20.2 |
| Majority | | 867 | 59.4 |
| Turnout | | 1,459 | 29.9 |
| SNP hold | | | |

=== Clerkhill ===
| Party | Candidate | Votes | % |
|---|---|---|---|
| SNP | D Mackinnon | 531 | 54.0 |
| Conservative | T Nangle | 230 | 23.4 |
| Independent | D Carnie (Incumbent) | 219 | 22.3 |
| Majority | | 301 | 30.6 |
| Turnout | | 983 | 32.4 |
| SNP gain from Independent | | | |

=== Rattray/Strichen ===
| Party | Candidate | Votes | % |
|---|---|---|---|
| Independent | N Cowie (Incumbent) | Unopposed | |
| Independent hold | | | |
