= 1980 Tweeddale District Council election =

1980 Scottish local government election

| ← 1977 | 1 May 1980 | 1984 → |

All 10 seats to Tweeddale District Council 6 seats needed for a majority
| | First party |
|---|---|
| Party | Independent |
| Last election | 10 seats, 96.8% |
| Seats won | 10 |
| Seat change | Steady |
| Popular vote | 1,353 |
| Percentage | 100.0% |
| Swing | ▲3.2% |

Elections to the Tweeddale District Council took place on 1 May 1980, alongside elections to the councils of Scotland's 53 other districts. There were 10 wards, which each elected a single member using the first-past-the-post voting system.

== Results ==
1980 Tweeddale District Council election result
| Party | Seats | Gains | Losses | Net gain/loss | Seats % | Votes % | Votes | +/− |
|---|---|---|---|---|---|---|---|---|
| Independent | 10 | 0 | 0 | Steady | 100.0 | 100.0 | 1,353 | ▲3.2 |
