= 1980 Colchester Borough Council election =

1980 English local election

- 1 May 1980

20 out of 60 seats to Colchester Borough Council 31 seats needed for a majority
- Turnout: 42.0% (▼31.9%)
	First party	Second party
Party	Conservative	Labour
Last election	36 seats, 50.2%	21 seats, 37.5%
Seats won	9	8
Seats after	35	22
Seat change	▼1	▲1
Popular vote	15,103	13,910
Percentage	44.7%	41.1%
Swing	▼5.5%	▲3.6%
	Third party	Fourth party
Party	Residents	Independent
Last election	2 seats, 4.2%	1 seat, 1.7%
Seats won	1	0
Seats after	2	1
Seat change	Steady	Steady
Popular vote	1,026	827
Percentage	3.0%	2.4%
Swing	▼1.2%	▲0.7%
- Winner of each seat at the 1980 Colchester Borough Council election.
Council control before election
Conservative
Council control after election
Conservative

The 1980 Colchester Borough Council election took place on 1 May 1980 to elect members of Colchester Borough Council in Essex, England. This was on the same day as local elections across the country.

The Conservatives maintained their majority on the council, but lost one seat to Labour, and slid in the popular vote, leading Labour by only 4%.

== Summary ==
1980 Colchester Borough Council election
Party	This election				Full council			This election		
Party	Candidates	Seats	Net	Seats %	Other	Total	Total %	Votes	Votes %	+/−
Conservative	20	9	▼1	50.0	26	35	58.3	15,103	44.7	–5.5
Labour	20	8	▲1	44.4	14	22	36.7	13,910	41.1	+3.6
Residents	1	1	Steady	5.6	1	2	3.3	1,026	3.0	–1.2
Independent	2	0	Steady	0.0	1	1	1.7	827	2.4	+0.7
Liberal	10	0	Steady	0.0	0	0	0.0	2,957	8.7	+0.6

== Ward results ==
=== Berechurch ===
Berechurch
Party	Candidate	Votes	%	±%
Labour	J. Fraser	995	46.0	−2.0
Liberal	M. Gage	651	30.1	+12.4
Conservative	C. Roxby	516	23.9	−10.4
Majority		344	15.9	+2.2
Turnout		2,162	38.2	−35.3
Registered electors		5,659		
Labour hold		Swing	▼7.2	

=== Castle ===
Castle
Party	Candidate	Votes	%	±%
Labour	D. Goodchild	917	45.0	−1.6
Conservative	A. Beevers	839	41.2	−0.1
Liberal	William Spyvee	281	13.8	+1.7
Majority		78	3.8	−1.5
Turnout		2,037	41.3	−32.4
Registered electors		4,929		
Labour hold		Swing	▼0.8	

=== Dedham ===
Dedham
Party	Candidate	Votes	%	±%
Conservative	J. Jackson*	517	68.8	+1.8
Liberal	G. Williams	123	16.4	N/A
Labour	J. Challinor	112	14.9	N/A
Majority		394	52.4	+18.4
Turnout		752	49.8	−2.5
Registered electors		1,511		
Conservative hold		Swing	N/A	

No Independent candidate as previous (-33.0).

=== East Donyland ===
East Donyland
Party	Candidate	Votes	%	±%
Conservative	J. Sanderson*	448	57.3	−0.3
Labour	E. Lilley	334	42.7	+0.3
Majority		114	14.6	−0.6
Turnout		782	58.5	−8.8
Registered electors		1,337		
Conservative hold		Swing	▼0.3	

=== Fordham ===
Fordham
Party	Candidate	Votes	%	±%
Conservative	C. Menzies	514	65.2	+10.0
Labour	H. Bryan	274	34.8	N/A
Majority		240	30.5	+20.1
Turnout		788	59.7	−4.1
Registered electors		1,321		
Conservative hold		Swing	N/A	

No Liberal candidate as previous (-44.8).

=== Harbour ===
Harbour
Party	Candidate	Votes	%	±%
Labour	J. Bird*	1,424	63.1	+9.6
Conservative	M. Coyne	834	36.9	−9.6
Majority		590	26.1	+19.1
Turnout		2,258	43.8	−33.3
Registered electors		5,154		
Labour hold		Swing	▲9.6	

=== Lexden ===
Lexden
Party	Candidate	Votes	%	±%
Conservative	J. Wheeler*	1,337	64.8	+2.9
Liberal	Ian Trusler	460	22.3	+0.3
Labour	J. Crawford	266	12.9	−3.2
Majority		877	42.5	+2.6
Turnout		2,063	51.4	−28.7
Registered electors		4,010		
Conservative hold		Swing	▲1.3	

=== Marks Tey ===
Marks Tey
Party	Candidate	Votes	%	±%
Conservative	E. James*	510	57.3	−20.9
Labour	D. Brede	380	42.7	+20.9
Majority		130	14.6	−41.8
Turnout		890	47.2	−0.5
Registered electors		1,886		
Conservative hold		Swing	▼20.9	

=== Mile End ===
Mile End
Party	Candidate	Votes	%	±%
Conservative	P. Borges	991	57.3	−3.2
Labour	Tim Oxton	739	42.7	+3.2
Majority		252	14.6	−6.3
Turnout		1,730	47.4	−28.4
Registered electors		3,648		
Conservative hold		Swing	▼3.2	

=== New Town ===
New Town
Party	Candidate	Votes	%	±%
Labour	Bob Russell*	1,354	68.3	+7.5
Conservative	H. Martin	411	20.7	−18.5
Liberal	John Loxley	218	11.0	N/A
Majority		943	47.6	+26.0
Turnout		1,983	43.7	−31.6
Registered electors		4,533		
Labour hold		Swing	▲13.0	

=== Prettygate ===
Prettygate
Party	Candidate	Votes	%	±%
Conservative	E. Kent*	1,205	53.6	−0.5
Labour	M. Hedge	694	30.9	+3.7
Liberal	Margaret Fisher	349	15.5	−3.2
Majority		511	22.7	−4.3
Turnout		2,248	45.2	−37.5
Registered electors		4,977		
Conservative hold		Swing	▼2.1	

=== Shrub End ===
Shrub End
Party	Candidate	Votes	%	±%
Labour	L. Woodrow*	1,103	58.1	+0.6
Conservative	J. Nicholls	548	28.9	−13.6
Liberal	G. Daldry	246	13.0	N/A
Majority		555	29.2	+14.2
Turnout		1,897	33.1	−24.1
Registered electors		5,726		
Labour hold		Swing	▲7.1	

=== St. Andrews ===
St. Andrew's
Party	Candidate	Votes	%	±%
Labour	C. Graves	1,487	70.9	+15.7
Conservative	Nigel Chapman	432	20.6	−11.9
Liberal	R. Baker	177	8.4	−3.9
Majority		1,055	50.3	+27.6
Turnout		2,096	27.6	−39.2
Registered electors		7,592		
Labour hold		Swing	▲13.8	

=== St. Annes ===
St. Anne's
Party	Candidate	Votes	%	±%
Labour	Mary Frank*	1,227	58.3	+8.4
Conservative	K. McLean	876	41.7	−8.4
Majority		351	16.6	N/A
Turnout		2,103	45.8	−30.5
Registered electors		4,589		
Labour hold		Swing	▲8.4	

=== St. Johns ===
St. John's
Party	Candidate	Votes	%	±%
Conservative	D. Smith	980	64.3	±0.0
Labour	R. Crookes	544	35.7	±0.0
Majority		436	28.6	±0.0
Turnout		1,524	43.6	−37.0
Registered electors		3,498		
Conservative hold		Swing	0.0	

=== St. Marys ===
St. Mary's
Party	Candidate	Votes	%	±%
Conservative	J. Brooks*	1,451	65.8	+6.2
Labour	Pauline Cook	453	20.6	−2.3
Liberal	Martin Hunt	300	13.6	−3.9
Majority		998	45.2	+8.4
Turnout		2,204	44.0	−31.9
Registered electors		5,012		
Conservative hold		Swing	▲4.3	

=== Stanway ===
Stanway
Party	Candidate	Votes	%	±%
Conservative	J. Lowater	834	51.4	−2.4
Labour	K. Taylor	637	39.2	+11.1
Liberal	M. Livermore	152	9.4	−8.7
Majority		197	12.2	−13.4
Turnout		1,623	42.8	−35.9
Registered electors		3,794		
Conservative hold		Swing	▼6.8	

=== Tiptree ===
Tiptree
Party	Candidate	Votes	%	±%
Residents	E. Bird	1,026	51.6	−6.4
Conservative	R. Bearman	720	36.2	+6.7
Labour	C. Kent	244	12.3	N/A
Majority		306	15.4	−13.1
Turnout		1,990	34.7	−42.8
Registered electors		5,731		
Residents hold		Swing	▼6.6	

No Liberal candidate as previous (-12.5).

=== West Mersea ===
West Mersea
Party	Candidate	Votes	%	±%
Conservative	L. Leader	1,121	66.1	−17.4
Independent	L. Broadhurst	426	25.1	N/A
Labour	J. Hockenhull	150	8.8	−7.7
Majority		695	41.0	−26.1
Turnout		1,697	38.4	−35.8
Registered electors		4,418		
Conservative hold		Swing	N/A	

=== Wivenhoe ===
Wivenhoe
Party	Candidate	Votes	%	±%
Labour	G. Davies	1,230	46.0	−2.9
Conservative	D. Wilkinson*	1,043	39.0	−12.1
Independent	V. Last	401	15.0	N/A
Majority		187	7.0	N/A
Turnout		2,674	50.8	−24.5
Registered electors		5,267		
Labour gain from Conservative		Swing	▲4.6	
