= 1980 North East Fife District Council election =

1980 Scottish local government election

Results by ward.

Elections to North East Fife District Council were held in May 1980, the same day as the other Scottish local government elections.

Turnout was 46.8% in the contested wards, with the wards of Freuchie, Cupar North, and Largo, all returning Conservative councilors unopposed.

The election would be the last one to the North East Fife council won by the Conservatives, with the next election in 1984 signalling the beginning of the Liberal dominance of the council which would last until its abolition in 1995.

== Election results ==
North East Fife District Council Election Result 1980
Party	Seats	Gains	Losses	Net gain/loss	Seats %	Votes %	Votes	+/−
Conservative	11			▼3		49.1	9,432	▼9.7
Liberal	5			▲4		29.6	5,696	▲18.6
Independent	2			▼1		9.4	1,803	▼10.2
Labour	0	0	0	0	0.0	7.4	1,423	▲0.5
SNP	0	0	0	0	0.0	4.5	870	▲0.8
