= 1980 West Lothian District Council election =

1980 Scottish local government election

- 1 May 1980

All 21 seats to West Lothian District Council 11 seats needed for a majority
	First party	Second party	Third party
Party	Labour	SNP	Independent
Last election	9 seats, 38.2%	9 seats, 47.0%	2 seats, 6.6%
Seats won	15	4	2
Seat change	▲6	▼5	Steady
Popular vote	21,849	14,760	3,565
Percentage	50.1%	33.8%	8.2%
Swing	▲11.9%	▼13.2%	▲1.6%
- Council composition following the election

Elections to West Lothian District Council were held on 1 May 1980, on the same day as the other Scottish local government elections. This was the third election to the district council following the implementation of the Local Government (Scotland) Act 1973.

The election used the 21 wards created by the Formation Electoral Arrangements in 1974. Each ward elected one councillor using first-past-the-post voting.

== Results ==
1980 West Lothian District Council election result
Party	Seats	Gains	Losses	Net gain/loss	Seats %	Votes %	Votes	+/−
Labour	15	6	0	▲6	71.4	50.1	21,849	▲11.9
SNP	4	0	5	▼5	19.0	33.8	14,760	▼13.2
Independent	2	1	1	Steady	9.5	8.2	3,565	▲1.6
Conservative	0	0	0	Steady	0.0	4.6	1,993	▲3.9
Liberal	0	0	0	Steady	0.0	2.7	1,163	▲1.0
Communist	0	0	0	Steady	0.0	0.7	306	▼0.6
