= 1980 Roxburgh District Council election =

1980 Scottish local government election

← 1977	1 May 1980	1984 →

All 16 seats to Roxburgh District Council 9 seats needed for a majority
	First party	Second party
Party	Independent	Conservative
Last election	12 seats, 63.3%	1 seat, 15.3%
Seats won	11	5
Seat change	▼1	▲4
Popular vote	2,816	1,911
Percentage	57.8%	31.8%
Swing	▼5.5%	▲16.5%

Elections to the Roxburgh District Council took place on 1 May 1980, alongside elections to the councils of Scotland's 53 other districts. There were 16 wards, which each elected a single member using the first-past-the-post voting system.

== Results ==
1980 Roxburgh District Council election result
Party	Seats	Gains	Losses	Net gain/loss	Seats %	Votes %	Votes	+/−
Independent	11	2	3	▼1	68.8	57.8	3,474	▼5.5
Conservative	5	4	0	▲4	31.3	31.8	1,911	▲16.5
Labour	0	0	1	▼1	0.0	10.4	622	▼2.2
