= 1984 Roxburgh District Council election =

1984 Scottish local government election

← 1980	3 May 1984	1988 →

All 16 seats to Roxburgh District Council 9 seats needed for a majority
	First party	Second party	Third party
Party	Independent	Conservative	Alliance
Last election	11 seats, 57.8%	5 seats, 31.8%	Did not contest
Seats won	7	5	4
Seat change	▼4	Steady	▲4
Popular vote	1,011	312	963
Percentage	44.2%	13.6%	42.1%
Swing	▼13.6%	▼18.2%	New

Elections to the Roxburgh District Council took place on 3 May 1984, alongside elections to the councils of Scotland's 53 other districts. There were 16 wards, which each elected a single member using the first-past-the-post voting system.

== Results ==
1984 Roxburgh District Council election result
Party	Seats	Gains	Losses	Net gain/loss	Seats %	Votes %	Votes	+/−
Independent	7			▼4	43.8	44.2	1,011	▼13.6
Conservative	5			Steady	31.3	13.6	312	▼18.2
Alliance	4	4	0	▲4	25.0	42.1	963	New
