= 1980 Welwyn Hatfield District Council election =

Welwyn Hatfield District Council election

- 1 May 1980

14 out of 43 seats to Welwyn Hatfield District Council 22 seats needed for a majority
- Turnout: 34,450, 50.7%

	First party	Second party	Third party
Party	Labour	Conservative	Liberal
Last election	22 seats, 45.0%	21 seats, 51.3%	0 seats, 3.6%
Seats before	22	21	0
Seats after	25	18	0
Seat change	▲3	▼3	Steady
Popular vote	18,076	15,227	972
Percentage	52.5%	44.2%	2.8%
Swing	▲7.5	▼7.1	▼0.8
- Council composition following the election.

The 1980 Welwyn Hatfield District Council election took place on 1 May 1980 to elect members of Welwyn Hatfield District Council in England. This was on the same day as other local elections. A third of the council's seats were up for election. Similar to the general trend of the local elections, Labour saw an increase in their share of the vote almost entirely at the expensive of the Conservatives. From this, Labour managed to increase their (previously razor-edge) majority control of the council. This marked the first election in Welwyn Hatfield's local elections that an independent candidate stood for a seat. They came third in the Welwyn South ward, below the Conservatives and Labour but beating the Liberals.

== Summary ==
=== Election result ===
1980 Welwyn Hatfield District Council election
Party	This election			Full council			This election		
Party	Seats	Net	Seats %	Other	Total	Total %	Votes	Votes %	+/−
Labour	9	▲3	64.3	16	25	58.1	18,076	52.5	+7.5
Conservative	5	▼3	35.7	13	18	41.9	15,227	44.2	–7.1
Liberal	0	Steady	0.0	0	0	0.0	972	2.8	–0.8
Independent	0	Steady	0.0	0	0	0.0	175	0.5	N/A
