= 1980 Angus District Council election =

Election in 1980

The 1980 Angus District Council election took place on the 1 May 1980 to elect members of Angus District Council, as part of that year's Scottish local elections.

== Election results ==
Angus District Election Result 1980
Party	Seats	Gains	Losses	Net gain/loss	Seats %	Votes %	Votes	+/−
Conservative	11	+2	-3	-1	50.0	39.5	10,564	-4.1
SNP	5	+5	0	+5		36.4	9,715	+19.0
Labour	2	0	-1	-1		15.1	4,256	-6.5
Independent	4	0	-3	-3		8.2	2,178	-8.4

== Ward results ==
Harbour
Party	Candidate	Votes	%	±%
Conservative	E. H. Milne	386	42.5	−39.6
SNP	W. T. Watson	379	41.7	+41.7
Labour	Ms. M. Malley	144	15.8	−2.1
Majority		7	0.8	−63.4
Turnout		901	41.0	+10.5
Conservative hold		Swing		

Abbey
Party	Candidate	Votes	%	±%
Labour	J. M. Proctor	749	53.0	−19.6
SNP	Ms. S. K. Thomson	471	33.3	+33.3
Conservative	J. D. Long	194	13.7	−13.7
Majority		278	19.7	−25.4
Turnout		1220	49.3	+12.2
Labour hold		Swing		

Timmergreens and Carmyllie
Party	Candidate	Votes	%	±%
Labour	N. L. Geaughan	777	44.1	−7.1
Conservative	Ms. H. E. Buncle	566	32.1	−8.6
SNP	T. M. Hamilton	418	23.7	+23.7
Majority		211	12.0	+1.5
Turnout		1761	52.4	

Keptie
Party	Candidate	Votes	%	±%
Conservative	Helen Cargill	979	56.0	−24.2
SNP	A. King	474	24.1	+24.1
Labour	Ms. J. S. Fairweather	292	16.7	−3.1
Majority		505	31.9	−28.5
Turnout		1745	44.6	−9.1

Hayshead and St. Vigeans
Party	Candidate	Votes	%	±%
SNP	B. M. Milne	617	36.9	+36.9
Conservative	R. D. Ramsay	549	32.8	−17.3
Labour	F. Donaldson	506	30.2	−13.1
Majority		68	4.1	
Turnout		1672	45.7	−0.2
SNP gain from Conservative		Swing		

Cliffburn
Party	Candidate	Votes	%	±%
SNP	Mrs. Sheena Welsh	627	47.9	+47.9
Labour	Ms. J. K. Cadenhead	476	36.4	−29.0
Conservative	R. Grieve	205	15.7	−18.9
Majority		151	11.5	
Turnout		1308	45.8	+11.2
SNP gain from Labour		Swing		

Carnoustie West and Panmure
Party	Candidate	Votes	%	±%
Conservative	H. G. Morton	954	45.9	+0.4
SNP	D. Hood	929	44.7	+1.8
Labour	E. Arbuthnott	189	9.1	−2.5
Majority		25	1.2	−1.4
Turnout		2078	49.2	+3.3

Carnoustie East and Panbride
Party	Candidate	Votes	%	±%
Conservative	D. Torrie	1,191	62.8	+0.5
SNP	T. Blackhall	695	36.6	−1.1
Majority		496	26.2	+1.6
Turnout		1898	50.7	−4.8

Forfar West
Party	Candidate	Votes	%	±%
SNP	F. Shaw	791	60.6	+60.6
Conservative	I. Hutchison	394	30.2	
Labour	Ms. A. Hutchison	115	8.8	
Majority		397	30.4	
Turnout		1,300		
SNP gain from Conservative		Swing		

Forfar South
Party	Candidate	Votes	%	±%
SNP	W. R. Roberton	746	52.3	
Conservative	H. MacPhail	595	41.7	
Labour	A. V. Dousse	85	6.0	
Majority		151	10.6	
Turnout		1427	43.3	
SNP gain from Conservative		Swing		

Forfar North
Party	Candidate	Votes	%	±%
Conservative	R. Forrester	826	52.5	
SNP	Ian Hudghton	741	47.1	
Majority		85	5.4	
Turnout		1572	52.3	
Conservative hold		Swing		

Montrose Central
Party	Candidate	Votes	%	±%
Independent	G. Norrie	891	77.5	
Labour	D. A. MacAllan	254	22.1	
Majority		637	55.4	
Turnout		1150	35.5	

Montrose North
Party	Candidate	Votes	%	±%
Independent	J. M. D. Smith	609	60.1	−8.3
Labour	F. Wood	402	39.6	+8.0
Majority		207	20.5	−16.3
Turnout		1014	30.8	

Montrose South
Party	Candidate	Votes	%	±%
Independent	W. M. Philips			
Majority				
Turnout				

Kirriemuir
Party	Candidate	Votes	%	±%
Conservative	T. J. Millar	1,076	58.8	
SNP	R. Wright	752	41.1	
Majority		324	17.7	
Turnout		1830	45.7	

The Glens
Party	Candidate	Votes	%	±%
Conservative	Ms. R. Dundas			
Majority				
Turnout				

Strathbeg
Party	Candidate	Votes	%	±%
Conservative	A. C. Russell	771	61.7	−0.8
SNP	D. W. Shortridge	477	38.2	+0.7
Majority		294	23.5	−1.5
Turnout		1249	51.5	−7.3

Dean
Party	Candidate	Votes	%	±%
Conservative	M. Struthers	803	54.5	−7.7
SNP	Ms. F. E. Duncan	669	45.4	+7.6
Majority		134	9.1	−15.3
Turnout		1474	45.9	

Northesk
Party	Candidate	Votes	%	±%
Conservative	D. L. Cuthbert	474	52.8	
Independent	W. J. Fraser	423	47.1	
Majority		51	5.7	
Turnout		898	32.3	
Conservative gain from Independent		Swing		

Southesk
Party	Candidate	Votes	%	±%
Conservative	Ms. Isobel M. McLellan	601	58.5	−3.9
SNP	W. A. West	419	40.8	+40.8
Majority		182	17.7	
Turnout		1077	39.0	−11.8
Conservative gain from Independent		Swing		

Brechin North
Party	Candidate	Votes	%	±%
Independent	A. Buchan			
Majority				
Turnout				

Brechin South
Party	Candidate	Votes	%	±%
SNP	J. Thomson	510	49.3	+49.3
Labour	D. K. Todd	267	25.8	−13.6
Independent	I. A. Beattie	255	24.7	
Majority		243	23.5	
Turnout		981	38.5	−6.3
SNP gain from Independent		Swing		
