= 1977 Tweeddale District Council election =

1977 Scottish local government election

← 1974	3 May 1977	1980 →

All 10 seats to Tweeddale District Council 6 seats needed for a majority
	First party
Party	Independent
Last election	10 seats, 100.0%
Seats won	10
Seat change	Steady
Popular vote	1,676
Percentage	96.8%
Swing	▼3.2%

Elections to Tweeddale District Council took place on 3 May 1977, alongside elections to the councils of Scotland's 53 other districts. There were 10 wards, which each elected a single member using the first-past-the-post voting system.

== Results ==
1977 Tweeddale District Council election result
Party	Seats	Gains	Losses	Net gain/loss	Seats %	Votes %	Votes	+/−
Independent	10	0	0	Steady	100.0	96.8	1,676	▼3.2
Labour	0	0	0	Steady	0.0	3.2	56	New
