= 1974 Tweeddale District Council election =

Tweeddale District Council election

| 7 May 1974 | 1977 → |

All 10 seats to Tweeddale District Council 6 seats needed for a majority
| | First party |
|---|---|
| Party | Independent |
| Seats won | 10 |
| Popular vote | 3,649 |
| Percentage | 100.0% |

Elections to Tweeddale District Council were held on 7 May 1974, on the same day as the other Scottish local government elections. This was the first election to the district council following the implementation of the Local Government (Scotland) Act 1973.

The election used the 10 wards created by the Formation Electoral Arrangements in 1974. Each ward elected one councillor using first-past-the-post voting.

Tweeddale was a non-partisan district. No political party contested the election and all of the 10 seats were won by independents.

== Background ==
Prior to 1974, the area that was to become Tweeddale included both burghs of the County of Peebles (Innerleithen and Peebles). These were both small burghs so the burgh council had limited powers which included some control over planning as well as local taxation, building control, housing, lighting and drainage with the rest of the local government responsibility falling to the county council.

Following the recommendations in the Wheatly Report, the old system of counties and burghs – which had resulted in a mishmash of local government areas in which some small burghs had larger populations but far fewer responsibilities than some large burghs and even counties – was to be replaced by a new system of regional and district councils. The Local Government (Scotland) Act 1973 implemented most of the recommendations in the Wheatly Report. The County of Peebles was placed into the Tweeddale district within the Borders region.

== Results ==
1974 Tweeddale District Council election result
| Party | Seats | Gains | Losses | Net gain/loss | Seats % | Votes % | Votes | +/− |
|---|---|---|---|---|---|---|---|---|
| Independent | 10 | | | N/A | 100.0 | 100.0 | 3,649 | N/A |

== Aftermath ==
Tweeddale, like two of the other three districts in the Borders, was non-partisan and controlled by Independent candidates who won all 10 seats. Independents also controlled the regional council which held its first election on the same day. Across Scotland, Labour won the most votes, the most seats and the most councils of any party.
