= 1977 Gordon District Council election =

1977 Scottish local government election

- 3 May 1977

All 12 seats to Gordon District Council 7 seats needed for a majority
| | First party | Second party | Third party |
|---|---|---|---|
| Party | Independent | Conservative | Liberal |
| Last election | 6 seats, 38.0% | 4 seats, 36.8% | 2 seats, 24.3% |
| Seats won | 7 | 3 | 2 |
| Seat change | ▲1 | ▼1 | 0 |
| Popular vote | 3,730 | 2,595 | 2,601 |
| Percentage | 37.9% | 26.4% | 26.4% |
| Swing | ▼0.1% | ▼10.4% | ▲2.1% |

Elections to the Gordon District Council took place on 3 May 1977, alongside elections to the councils of Scotland's various other districts.

== Results ==
1977 Gordon District Council election result
| Party | Seats | Gains | Losses | Net gain/loss | Seats % | Votes % | Votes | +/− |
|---|---|---|---|---|---|---|---|---|
| Independent | 7 | | | ▲1 | 58.3 | 37.9 | 3,730 | ▼0.1 |
| Conservative | 3 | | | ▼1 | 25.0 | 26.4 | 2,595 | ▼10.4 |
| Liberal | 2 | | | Steady | 16.7 | 26.4 | 2,601 | ▲2.1 |
| SNP | 0 | 0 | 0 | Steady | 0.0 | 9.3 | 915 | New |
