= 1980 Broxbourne Borough Council election =

1980 UK local government election

The Broxbourne Council election, 1980 was held to elect council members of the Broxbourne Borough Council, the local government authority of the borough of Broxbourne, Hertfordshire, England.

== Composition of expiring seats before election ==
Ward	Party	Incumbent Elected	Incumbent	Standing again?
Broxbourne	Conservative	1976	Joan Fiddy	Yes
Bury Green	Conservative	1976	Benjamin Griffiths	Yes
Cheshunt Central	Conservative	1976	Douglas Breeze	Yes
Cheshunt North	Conservative	1976	Gerald Game	Yes
Flamstead End	Conservative	1976	Peter Sampson	No
Goffs Oak	Conservative	1976	Michael Janes	Yes
Hoddesdon North	Conservative	1976	John Hastings	Yes
Hoddesdon Town	Conservative	1976	Percy Madsen	Yes
Rosedale	Labour	1976	Hazel Ross	Yes
Rye Park	Conservative	1976	Geoffrey Conway	Yes
Theobalds	Conservative	1976	Malcolm Linscott	No
Waltham Cross North	Conservative	1976	Terence Askew (Note: Terence Askew stood in Theobalds Ward in 1980.)	Yes
Waltham Cross South	Labour	1976	Patricia Young	Yes
Wormley & Turnford	Conservative	1976	Gerald Cookson	Yes

== Election results ==
Broxbourne local election result 1980
Party	Seats	Gains	Losses	Net gain/loss	Seats %	Votes %	Votes	+/−
Conservative	9	0	3	-3	64.28	45.78	9,239	
Labour	4	2	0	+2	28.58	34.00	6,863	
Liberal	1	1	0	+1	7.14	17.27	3,485	
Independent	0	0	0	0	0.00	1.95	393	
National Front	0	0	0	0	0.00	1.01	203	

== Results summary ==
An election was held in 14 wards on 1 May 1980.

The Conservative Party lost 3 seats at this election. The Labour Party gained 2 seats in Bury Green Ward and Rye Park Ward and the Liberal Party won its first seat at a Broxbourne Borough election by taking Hoddesdon Town Ward.

The new political balance of the council following this election was:

- Conservative 34 seats
- Labour 7 seats
- Liberal 1 seat

== Ward results ==
Broxbourne Ward Result 1 May 1980
Party	Candidate	Votes	%	±%
Conservative	Joan Fiddy	1,046	57.13	
Liberal	Rachel Hills	555	30.31	
Labour	Julian Batsleer	230	12.56	
Majority		491		
Turnout		1,831	36.50	
Conservative hold		Swing		

Bury Green Ward Result 1 May 1980
Party	Candidate	Votes	%	±%
Labour	Christopher Robbins	1,185	57.44	
Conservative	Benjamin Griffiths	751	36.40	
Liberal	George Norris	93	4.51	
National Front	Clive Shepherd	34	1.65	
Majority		434		
Turnout		2,063	41.05	
Labour gain from Conservative		Swing		

Cheshunt Central Ward Result 1 May 1980
Party	Candidate	Votes	%	±%
Conservative	Douglas Breeze	744	60.84	
Labour	Patricia Whitthread	347	28.37	
Liberal	Lesley Dines	132	10.79	
Majority		397		
Turnout		1,223	33.85	
Conservative hold		Swing		

Cheshunt North Ward Result 1 May 1980
Party	Candidate	Votes	%	±%
Conservative	Gerald Game	609	36.98	
Labour	Deirdre Welsh	555	33.70	
Independent	Leslie Hill	252	15.30	
Liberal	Lawrence Talbot	198	12.02	
National Front	Simon Maddock	33	2.00	
Majority		54		
Turnout		1,647	36.25	
Conservative hold		Swing		

Flamstead End Ward Result 1 May 1980
Party	Candidate	Votes	%	±%
Conservative	Edna Lazzari	840	49.18	
Labour	Michael Crane	463	27.11	
Liberal	Peter Kemp	356	20.84	
National Front	Frederick Venables	49	2.87	
Majority		377		
Turnout		1,708	39.70	
Conservative hold		Swing		

Goffs Oak Ward Result 1 May 1980
Party	Candidate	Votes	%	±%
Conservative	Michael Janes	886	73.59	
Labour	Christopher Purple	184	15.28	
Liberal	Julian Gould	134	11.13	
Majority		702		
Turnout		1,204	38.32	
Conservative hold		Swing		

Hoddesdon North Ward Result 1 May 1980
Party	Candidate	Votes	%	±%
Conservative	John Hastings	885	50.66	
Liberal	Pamela Armfield	530	30.34	
Labour	Tony Pusey	332	19.00	
Majority		355		
Turnout		1,747		
Conservative hold		Swing		

Hoddesdon Town Ward Result 1 May 1980
Party	Candidate	Votes	%	±%
Liberal	Gil Bomber	548	40.47	
Conservative	Percy Madsen	543	40.11	
Labour	Jill Garrett	263	19.42	
Majority		5		
Turnout		1,354	30.47	
Liberal gain from Conservative		Swing		

Rosedale Ward Result 1 May 1980
Party	Candidate	Votes	%	±%
Labour	Hazel Ross	393	51.71	
Conservative	John Swannell	286	37.63	
Liberal	Kenneth Furse	54	7.11	
National Front	Ramon Johns	27	3.55	
Majority		107		
Turnout		760	45.89	
Labour hold		Swing		

Rye Park Ward Result 1 May 1980
Party	Candidate	Votes	%	±%
Labour	Mark Farrington	652	42.04	
Conservative	Geoffrey Conway	557	35.91	
Liberal	Anthony Fey	312	20.12	
National Front	Roderick Waller	30	1.93	
Majority		95		
Turnout		1,551	35.16	
Labour gain from Conservative		Swing		

Theobalds Ward Result 1 May 1980
Party	Candidate	Votes	%	±%
Conservative	Terence Askew	691	49.08	
Labour	Joan Carter	578	41.05	
Liberal	Jeffrey Butler	139	9.87	
Majority		113		
Turnout		1,408	34.75	
Conservative hold		Swing		

Waltham Cross North Ward Result 1 May 1980
Party	Candidate	Votes	%	±%
Conservative	Francis Dolan	609	51.74	
Labour	Henry Lucas	494	41.97	
Liberal	Roberta Middlebrook	74	6.29	
Majority		115		
Turnout		1,177		
Conservative hold		Swing		

Waltham Cross South Ward Result 1 May 1980
Party	Candidate	Votes	%	±%
Labour	Patricia Young	760	63.97	
Conservative	Roy Chaplow	320	26.94	
Liberal	Thomas Wade	78	6.57	
National Front	Roger Bailey	30	2.52	
Majority		440		
Turnout		1,188	29.13	
Labour hold		Swing		

Wormley / Turnford Ward Result 1 May 1980
Party	Candidate	Votes	%	±%
Conservative	Gerald Cookson	472	35.70	
Labour	James Emslie	427	32.30	
Liberal	Barbara Wade	282	21.34	
Independent	William Smith	141	10.66	
Majority		45		
Turnout		1,322	39.09	
Conservative hold		Swing		
