= Strathkelvin =

Former local government district in Scotland

Coordinates: 55.928°N 4.134°W

- District
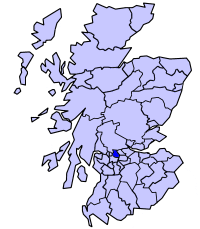
- History
  - Created: 16 May 1975
  - Abolished: 31 March 1996
  - Succeeded by: East Dunbartonshire; North Lanarkshire
- Government: Strathkelvin District Council
  - HQ: Kirkintilloch

Strathkelvin (Scottish Gaelic: Srath Chealbhainn) is the strath (valley) of the River Kelvin in west central Scotland, lying north-east of Glasgow. The name Strathkelvin was used between 1975 and 1996 for one of nineteen local government districts in the Strathclyde region.

== History ==
The district was created in 1975 under the Local Government (Scotland) Act 1973, which established a two-tier structure of local government across mainland Scotland comprising upper-tier regions and lower-tier districts. Strathkelvin was one of nineteen districts created within the region of Strathclyde. The district covered parts of five former districts from the historic counties of Dunbartonshire, Lanarkshire, and Stirlingshire, all of which were abolished at the same time:

- From Dunbartonshire
  - Kirkintilloch Burgh
  - Kirkintilloch and Cumbernauld District: the landward (outside a burgh) part of the parish of Kirkintilloch, excluding the parts within the designated area for Cumbernauld New Town
- From Lanarkshire
  - Bishopbriggs Burgh
  - Ninth District: the Chryston and Stepps electoral divisions
- From Stirlingshire
  - Western No. 3 District, being the parishes of Baldernock and Campsie

The 1973 Act named the new district "Bishopbriggs and Kirkintilloch". The shadow council elected in 1974 to oversee the transition to the new system requested a change of name to "Strathkelvin", referring to the area's location in the valley or strath of the River Kelvin. The change of name was approved by the government before the new district came into being.

The district was abolished in 1996 under the Local Government etc. (Scotland) Act 1994 which replaced regions and districts with unitary council areas. Most of Strathkelvin went to the East Dunbartonshire council area, but the Chryston and Auchinloch area went instead to North Lanarkshire.

The Strathkelvin name is still used in the judicial sheriffdom of "Glasgow and Strathkelvin".

== Political control ==
The first election to the district council was held in 1974, initially operating as a shadow authority alongside the outgoing authorities until it came into its powers on 16 May 1975. Political control of the council from 1975 was as follows:

| Party in control | Years |
|---|---|
| No overall control | 1975–1980 |
| Labour | 1980–1996 |

=== Leadership ===
Full council meetings were chaired by the provost. Political leadership was provided by the leader of the council. The leaders from 1984 until the council's abolition were:

| Councillor | Party | From | To |
|---|---|---|---|
| Charles Kennedy | Labour | 1984 | Jan 1989 |
| Andrew Cochrane | Labour | Jan 1989 | May 1992 |
| Bobby Coyle | Labour | May 1992 | May 1993 |
| Brian Wallace | Labour | Jun 1993 | Sep 1994 |
| Charles Kennedy | Labour | Sep 1994 | 31 Mar 1996 |

The last leader of the council, Charles Kennedy, went on to be the first leader of the successor East Dunbartonshire Council.

=== Elections ===
Elections were held as follows:

| Year | Seats | Labour | Conservative | SNP | Liberal Democrats | Independent / Other | Notes |
|---|---|---|---|---|---|---|---|
| 1974 | 14 | 6 | 5 | 2 | 0 | 1 | |
| 1977 | 14 | 4 | 4 | 6 | 0 | 0 | |
| 1980 | 14 | 10 | 4 | 0 | 0 | 0 | |
| 1984 | 15 | 11 | 4 | 0 | 0 | 0 | |
| 1988 | 15 | 12 | 2 | 0 | 1 | 0 | |
| 1992 | 15 | 9 | 6 | 0 | 0 | 0 | |

== Premises ==
The council was initially based at several offices across the district. In 1985 it built a new headquarters at the junction of Lenzie Road and Civic Way in Kirkintilloch. The building was called Tom Johnston House, named after Tom Johnston (1881–1965), who was born in Kirkintilloch and had served as Secretary of State for Scotland during the Second World War. After the council's abolition in 1996, Tom Johnston House served as the headquarters of the successor East Dunbartonshire Council until 2012, and has subsequently been demolished.

== See also ==
- Subdivisions of Scotland
