= 1980 Wolverhampton Metropolitan Borough Council election =

1980 UK local government election

Wolverhampton Metropolitan Borough Council elections in 1980 were held on Thursday 1 May.

Following the elections the Labour Party had overall control of the council.

The composition of the council prior to the election was:

- Labour 28
- Conservative 30
- Wolverhampton Association of Ratepayers 2

The composition of the council following the election was:

- Labour 32
- Conservative 28

== Ward results ==
Bilston East
Party	Candidate	Votes	%	±%
Labour	Larkin	1747		
Conservative	P D Myers	520		
Independent Ratepayers	S Davis	120		
Majority		1227		
Labour hold		Swing		

Bilston North
Party	Candidate	Votes	%	±%
Labour	J Kyte	1555		
Conservative	E J Edwards	1350		
Independent Ratepayers	A D Badderly	325		
Majority		205		
Labour gain from Conservative		Swing		

Blakenhall
Party	Candidate	Votes	%	±%
Labour	B Jones	2072		
Conservative	Freda M Rixson	1993		
Majority		79		
Labour gain from Conservative		Swing		

Bushbury
Party	Candidate	Votes	%	±%
Labour	Bird	1320		
Conservative	Isabel Morrison Bickley	828		
Independent Ratepayers	D K Prince	467		
Majority		492		
Labour hold		Swing		

Eastfield
Party	Candidate	Votes	%	±%
Labour	F Smith	1717		
Conservative	R Squires	759		
Liberal	C G Hallmark	415		
Majority		958		
Labour hold		Swing		

Ettingshall
Party	Candidate	Votes	%	±%
Labour	T Lane	1318		
Conservative	K J Clark	603		
Majority		715		
Labour hold		Swing		

Graiseley
Party	Candidate	Votes	%	±%
Labour	Mrs V Fletcher	1720		
Conservative	N H George	1090		
Independent Ratepayers	B Simmonds	159		
Independent	Sachindra Prasad	136		
Majority		630		
Labour hold		Swing		

Low Hill
Party	Candidate	Votes	%	±%
Labour	R Garner	1443		
Conservative	Frances M Dewsbury	799		
Majority		644		
Labour hold		Swing		

Merry Hill
Party	Candidate	Votes	%	±%
Conservative	R Bradley	3593		
Labour		1184		
Independent Ratepayers		548		
Majority		2409		
Conservative hold		Swing		

Oxley
Party	Candidate	Votes	%	±%
Conservative	A Findlay	1731		
Labour	S L Lydon	1109		
Independent Ratepayers	R F Stickland	959		
Liberal	Noreen G Hallmark	118		
Communist	P McDonald	30		
Majority		622		

Conservative gain from Ratepayers

Park
Party	Candidate	Votes	%	±%
Conservative	Mrs M Machin	2029		
Labour	S R Holding	1059		
Liberal	A D Craft	680		
Majority		970		
Conservative hold		Swing		

Parkfield
Party	Candidate	Votes	%	±%
Labour	Dr B Chakraborty	1595		
Conservative	J P Ellis	557		
Independent	S Hunting	394		
Majority		1036		
Labour hold		Swing		

Penn
Party	Candidate	Votes	%	±%
Conservative	A Hart	3532		
Labour	Trudy A Bowen	641		
Independent Ratepayers	R J Thomas	613		
Majority		2891		
Conservative hold		Swing		

St Peters
Party	Candidate	Votes	%	±%
Labour	S S Duhra	1907		
Conservative	J R Inglis			
Communist	G J Barnsby	88		
Independent	Bindu Prasard	43		
Majority		1270		
Labour hold		Swing		

Spring Vale
Party	Candidate	Votes	%	±%
Labour	N Davies	1984		
Conservative	B J Carpenter	1573		
National Front	E N Shaw	203		
Majority		411		
Labour hold		Swing		

Tettenhall Regis
Party	Candidate	Votes	%	±%
Conservative	Mrs D Seiboth	3080		
Independent Ratepayers	Freda Sneyd	786		
Labour	Lesly Leader-Williams	463		
Majority		2294		
Conservative hold		Swing		

Tettenhall Wightwick
Party	Candidate	Votes	%	±%
Conservative	P Snell	3406		
Labour	M A Smith	684		
Independent Ratepayers	Elizabeth M Powell	390		
Majority		2721		
Conservative hold		Swing		

Wednesfield Heath
Party	Candidate	Votes	%	±%
Conservative	J Curtiss	2005		
Labour	Patricia Byrne	1213		
Independent Ratepayers	Nellie Morris	414		
Majority		792		
Conservative hold		Swing		

Wednesfield North
Party	Candidate	Votes	%	±%
Labour	R Davies	2095		
Conservative	R Woodhouse	1649		
Independent Ratepayers	Kathleen Johnston	317		
Liberal	J S Thompson	310		
Majority		446		
Labour hold		Swing		

Wednesfield South
Party	Candidate	Votes	%	±%
Conservative	R Squire	1516		
Labour	Clarice M Nicholls	1407		
Liberal	Jean M Perkins	277		
Independent Ratepayers	Valerie A Sharples	196		
Majority		109		
Conservative hold		Swing		
