= 1980 Penwith District Council election =

Local election in the United Kingdom

Elections to Penwith District Council were held in 1980 for 11 seats of 33 on the council.

After the election, the composition of the council was: 27 Independents, 3 Conservatives, 2 Liberals, and 1 Labour. Mebyon Kernow stood in two wards, but did not win any seats.

== Results summary ==
Penwith local election result 1980
Party	Seats	Gains	Losses	Net gain/loss	Seats %	Votes %	Votes	+/−
Independent	8	1	2	▼1	72.7	46.70	3,407	
Liberal	2	2	0	▲2	18.2	14.54	1,061	
Conservative	1	0	1	▼1	9.1	21.85	1,594	
Labour	0	0	0	Steady	0.0	11.24	820	
Mebyon Kernow	0	0	0	Steady	0.0	5.66	413	
