= 1980 Gloucester City Council election =

UK local election

The 1980 Gloucester City Council election took place on 5 May 1980 to elect members of Gloucester City Council in England.

== Results ==
Gloucester City Council election, 1980
Party	Seats	Gains	Losses	Net gain/loss	Seats %	Votes %	Votes	+/−
Conservative	21				63.6			
Labour	9				27.3			
Liberal	3				9.1			

== Ward results ==
=== Barnwood ===
Barnwood 1980
Party	Candidate	Votes	%	±%
Labour	Ms. E. Hedge	1,328	49.4	
Conservative	M.* Wooltorton	1,037	38.6	
Liberal	A. Cooper	322	12.0	
Turnout		2,687	38.1	
Labour gain from Conservative		Swing		

=== Barton ===
Barton 1980
Party	Candidate	Votes	%	±%
Labour	P.* Harris	1,011	50.1	
Conservative	A. Gravells	833	41.3	
Liberal	W. Paterson	174	8.6	
Turnout		2,018	35.3	
Labour hold		Swing		

=== Eastgate ===
Eastgate 1980
Party	Candidate	Votes	%	±%
Labour	Ms. S. Edgington	1,104	50.0	
Conservative	Ms.* J. Bracey	862	39.0	
Liberal	Ms. W. Steele	244	11.0	
Turnout		2,210	36.0	
Labour gain from Conservative		Swing		

=== Hucclecote ===
Hucclecote 1980
Party	Candidate	Votes	%	±%
Conservative	C.* Pullon	1,452	47.7	
Labour	E. Andrews	953	31.3	
Liberal	R. Cox	640	21.0	
Turnout		3,045	49.8	
Conservative hold		Swing		

=== Kingsholm ===
Kingsholm 1980
Party	Candidate	Votes	%	±%
Conservative	L.* Journeaux	1,210	47.0	
Labour	Ms. C. Lomas	706	27.4	
Liberal	J. Hilton	508	19.7	
Independent	A. Harley	150	5.8	
Turnout		2,574	44.7	
Conservative hold		Swing		

=== Linden ===
Linden 1980
Party	Candidate	Votes	%	±%
Labour	Grimes R.	1,094	48.6	
Conservative	P.* Lever	914	40.6	
Liberal	Ms. E. Drinan	241	10.7	
Turnout		2,249	38.8	
Labour gain from Conservative		Swing		

=== Longlevens ===
Longlevens 1980
Party	Candidate	Votes	%	±%
Conservative	J.* Robins	1,304	45.2	
Labour	Ms. S. Day	868	24.6	
Liberal	D. Hodges	280	9.7	
Independent	M. Butler	235	8.2	
Turnout		2,687	46.6	
Conservative hold		Swing		

=== Matson ===
Matson 1980
Party	Candidate	Votes	%	±%
Labour	A.* Walters	1,409	66.2	
Conservative	G. Marsh	493	23.2	
Liberal	T. Mulvey	388	16.3	
Turnout		2.290	33.9	
Labour hold		Swing		

=== Podsmead ===
Podsmead 1980
Party	Candidate	Votes	%	±%
Liberal	R. Barber	1,332	51.7	
Conservative	Ms. J. Feher	665	25.8	
Labour	D.* Knibbs	578	22.4	
Turnout		2,575	44.1	
Liberal hold		Swing		

=== Tuffley ===
Tuffley 1980
Party	Candidate	Votes	%	±%
Conservative	F.* Price	1,325	45.8	
Labour	J. Dillon	1,197	41.4	
Liberal	J. Simpson	369	12.8	
Turnout		2,891	52.3	
Conservative hold		Swing		

=== Westgate ===
Westgate 1980
Party	Candidate	Votes	%	±%
Conservative	C.* Fudge	803	42.7	
Labour	Ms. E. Mayall	528	28.1	
Liberal	R. Welshman	447	23.8	
Ecology	J. Eaton	104	5.5	
Turnout		1,882	35.0	
Conservative hold		Swing		
