= 1980 Bearsden and Milngavie District Council election =

1980 Scottish local government election

The 1980 Bearsden and Milngavie District Council election took place on 1 May 1980, alongside elections to the councils of Scotland's 53 other districts.

== Results ==
1980 Bearsden and Milngavie District Council election result
Party	Seats	Gains	Losses	Net gain/loss	Seats %	Votes %	Votes	+/−
Conservative	6	1	1	Steady	60.0	57.6	8,748	▲8.0
Labour	2	1	0	▲1	20.0	18.1	2,743	▲10.5
Independent	2	0	1	▼1	20.0	8.9	1,349	▼14.9
Liberal	0	0	0	Steady	0.0	9.7	1,472	▲1.4
SNP	0	0	0	Steady	0.0	5.8	879	▼5.0
