= 1977 Strathkelvin District Council election =

1977 Scottish local government election

The 1977 Strathkelvin District Council election took place on 3 May 1977, alongside elections to the councils of Scotland's 53 other districts.

== Results ==
1977 Strathkelvin District Council election result
Party	Seats	Gains	Losses	Net gain/loss	Seats %	Votes %	Votes	+/−
SNP	6	4	0	▲4	42.9	30.6	9,891	▲6.9
Labour	4	1	3	▼2	28.6	34.4	11,152	▼0.9
Conservative	4	0	1	▼1	28.6	32.8	10,623	▲3.5
Independent	0	0	1	▼1	0.0	2.2	709	▼7.4
