= 1977 Bearsden and Milngavie District Council election =

1977 Scottish local government election

The 1977 Bearsden and Milngavie District Council election took place on 3 May 1977, alongside elections to the councils of Scotland's 53 other districts.

== Results ==
1977 Bearsden and Milngavie District Council election result
Party	Seats	Gains	Losses	Net gain/loss	Seats %	Votes %	Votes	+/−
Conservative	6	2	1	▲1	60.0	49.6	8,327	▼0.3
Independent	3	1	2	▼1	30.0	23.8	3,991	▼5.1
Labour	1	0	0	Steady	10.0	7.6	1,275	▼6.1
SNP	0	0	0	Steady	0.0	10.8	1,812	New
Liberal	0	0	0	Steady	0.0	8.3	1,392	▲0.8
