= 1980 Strathkelvin District Council election =

1980 Scottish local government election

The 1980 Strathkelvin District Council election took place on 1 May 1980, alongside elections to the councils of Scotland's 53 other districts.

== Results ==
1980 Strathkelvin District Council election result
| Party | Seats | Gains | Losses | Net gain/loss | Seats % | Votes % | Votes | +/− |
|---|---|---|---|---|---|---|---|---|
| Labour | 10 | 6 | 0 | ▲6 | 71.4 | 48.3 | 13,339 | ▲13.9 |
| Conservative | 4 | 0 | 0 | Steady | 28.6 | 27.8 | 7,679 | ▼5.0 |
| SNP | 0 | 0 | 6 | ▼6 | 0.0 | 23.9 | 6,583 | ▼6.7 |
