= Kincardine and Deeside =

Scottish local government district (1975–1996), part of Grampian region

Coordinates: 57.026°N 3.012°W

- Kincardine and Deeside district within Scotland
- History
  - Created: 16 May 1975
  - Abolished: 31 Mar 1996
  - Succeeded by: Aberdeenshire
- Status: District
  - HQ: Stonehaven

Kincardine and Deeside was one of five local government districts in the Grampian region of Scotland. Its council was based in Stonehaven. It was created in 1975 and abolished in 1996, when the area was included in the Aberdeenshire council area.

== History ==
This region is rich in prehistory with numerous megalithic sites, notable in the earliest period of recorded history with several significant Roman sites. The region is also traversed by several ancient trackways across the Grampian Mountains, including the Causey Mounth and Elsick Mounth. In addition there is evidence of ancient burials from the Beaker Period.

The district was created on 16 May 1975 under the Local Government (Scotland) Act 1973, which established a two-tier structure of local government across Scotland comprising upper-tier regions and lower-tier districts. Kincardine and Deeside was one of five districts created within the Grampian region. The district covered most of the historic county of Kincardineshire and part of the neighbouring county of Aberdeenshire. The new district covered the whole area of ten former districts and parts of another two, which were all abolished at the same time:

From Aberdeenshire

- Aberdeen district (Drumoak parish only)
- Ballater burgh
- Deeside district

From Kincardineshire

- Banchory burgh
- Inverbervie burgh
- Laurencekirk burgh
- Laurencekirk district
- Lower Deeside district (except the parish of Nigg, which went to the City of Aberdeen (Note: The parish of Nigg transferred in 1975 only covered the residual rural part of the historic parish of Nigg, principally being the Cove Bay area; the remainder had previously been transferred to the city of Aberdeen in boundary changes in 1891, 1935 and 1970.))
- St Cyrus district
- Stonehaven burgh
- Stonehaven district
- Upper Deeside district

The regions and districts created in 1975 were abolished in 1996, being replaced by council areas. The area of Kincardine and Deeside was merged with the Banff and Buchan and Gordon districts to become the new Aberdeenshire council area.

== Political control ==
The first election to the district council was held in 1974, initially operating as a shadow authority alongside the outgoing authorities until it came into its powers on 16 May 1975. Political control of the council from 1975 until its abolition in 1996 was as follows:

Party in control	Years
Independent	1975–1988
No overall control	1988–1996

== Premises ==
The council was based at Viewmount on Arduthie Road in Stonehaven. The building had been the headquarters of Kincardineshire County Council since 1935. It had been built in 1881 as a house, and by the 1920s had been converted to offices. Following a fire in 1932 it was largely rebuilt and extended in order to become the county council's main offices and meeting place, being formally opened as such on 8 May 1935.

After the council's abolition in 1996, Viewmount became an area office for the successor Aberdeenshire Council.

== Places of interest ==
- Dunnottar Castle
- Fowlsheugh Nature Reserve
- Muchalls Castle
- Portlethen Moss

== See also ==
- Subdivisions of Scotland

== Bibliography ==
- C. Michael Hogan (2007) Elsick Mounth, The Megalithic Portal, ed A. Burnham
- A. Small, Margaret Bruce and Ian A.G. Shepherd (1988) A Beaker Child Burial from Catterline, Kincardine and Deeside, Proc. Soc. Antiquaries Scotland 118: 71-77
