= Gordon (district) =

Former local government area of Scotland

- Gordon district within Scotland
- History
  - Created: 16 May 1975
  - Abolished: 31 Mar 1996
  - Succeeded by: Aberdeenshire
- Status: District
- Government: Gordon District Council
  - HQ: Inverurie
- Coat of arms of Gordon District Council

Gordon was one of five local government districts in the Grampian region of Scotland. The council was based in Inverurie. It was created in 1975 and abolished in 1996, when the area was included in the Aberdeenshire council area.

== History ==
The district was created on 16 May 1975 under the Local Government (Scotland) Act 1973, which established a two-tier structure of local government across Scotland comprising upper-tier regions and lower-tier districts. Gordon was one of five districts created within the Grampian region. The new district covered the whole area of eight former districts and parts of another two, which were all abolished at the same time:

- Aberdeen district (parishes of Belhelvie, Echt, Fintray, Kinellar, New Machar, and Skene only)
- Alford district
- Ellon burgh
- Ellon district (except parish of Cruden)
- Garioch district
- Huntly burgh
- Huntly district
- Inverurie burgh
- Kintore burgh
- Oldmeldrum burgh

The whole area was part of the county of Aberdeenshire prior to the reforms.

Various names were considered for the new district, with alternatives including Bennachie from a range of hills in the area, Mar after one of the historic provinces of Scotland, and Donside from the River Don which flows through the area. At a meeting in March 1972 the old Aberdeenshire County Council voted in favour of recommending to the government that Gordon should be the new district's name, after the Clan Gordon which had extensive landholdings in the area, including the clan's then principal seat of Haddo House. The clan took its name from the village of Gordon in Berwickshire.

The regions and districts created in 1975 were abolished in 1996, being replaced by council areas. The area of Gordon was merged with the Banff and Buchan and Kincardine and Deeside districts to become the new Aberdeenshire council area.

== Political control ==
The first election to the district council was held in 1974, initially operating as a shadow authority alongside the outgoing authorities until it came into its powers on 16 May 1975. Political control of the council from 1975 until its abolition in 1996 was as follows:

Party in control	Years
No overall control	1975–1977
Independent	1977–1980
No overall control	1980–1984
Independent	1984–1988
Liberal Democrats	1988–1992
Independent	1992–1996

== Premises ==
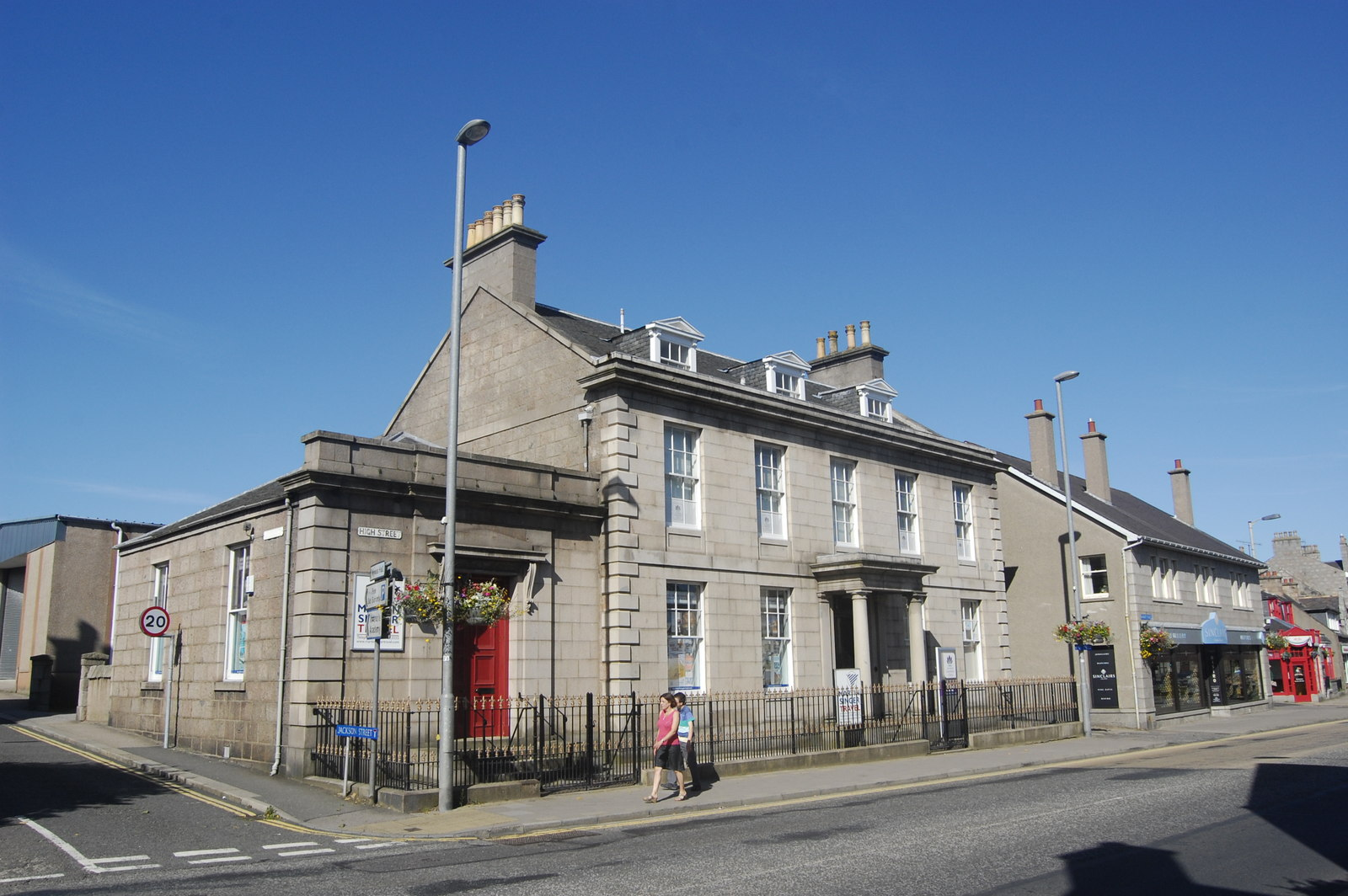
3 High Street, Inverurie: Council's main offices 1975–1982

The council initially met at Inverurie Town Hall and had its main offices in a converted former bank at 3 High Street in Inverurie, with additional offices in various other locations. Shortly after the council's creation it decided to consolidate its meeting place and offices at a purpose-built headquarters. Gordon House was subsequently built on Blackhall Road in Inverurie in phases between 1980 and 1982. It also housed some departments of Grampian Regional Council. Gordon House was formally opened on 9 July 1982.

After the council's abolition in 1996, Gordon House became an area office for the successor Aberdeenshire Council.

== Coat of arms ==
The Gordon District Council was granted a coat of arms by Lord Lyon King of Arms on 9 June 1986. The first quarter of the shield showed three gold boars' heads on a blue ground, the arms of the Gordon family, from whom the district's name was derived. The Gordon arms had formed one quarter of the arms of Aberdeenshire County Council. Boars' heads also formed part of the arms of the burgh of Huntly. The second quarter was derived from the Kintore burgh arms, showing an oak tree. The third quarter was based on the arms of the burgh of Oldmeldrum and the fourth on those of the burgh of Ellon. In the centre of the shield was a gold tower, from Inverurie's burgh arms. Above the arms was a coronet consisting of a gold circlet topped by thistle-heads: a design reserved by Lord Lyon for the arms of district councils.

== See also ==
- Gordon (Scottish Parliament constituency)
- Clan Gordon
- Gordon Highlanders, an infantry regiment
- Subdivisions of Scotland
