= 1980 Scottish local elections =

- 1 May 1980
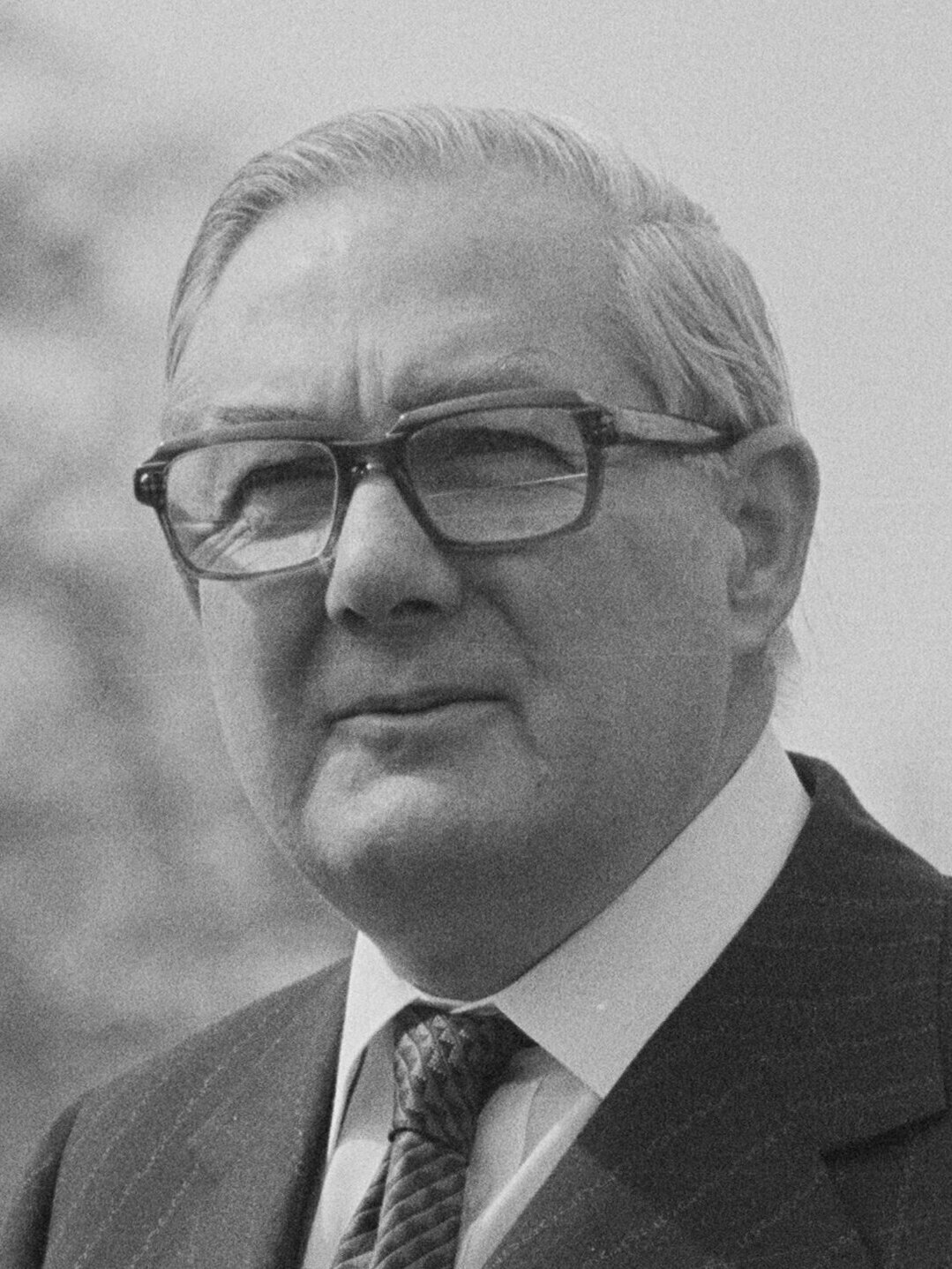

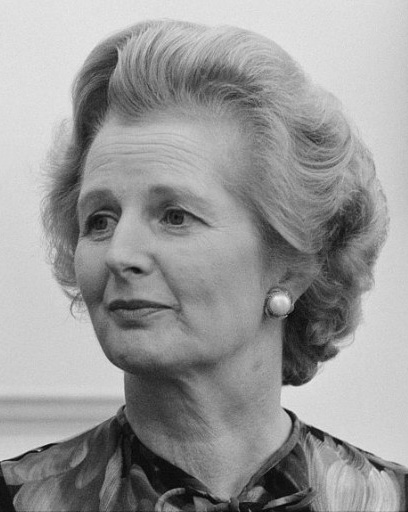

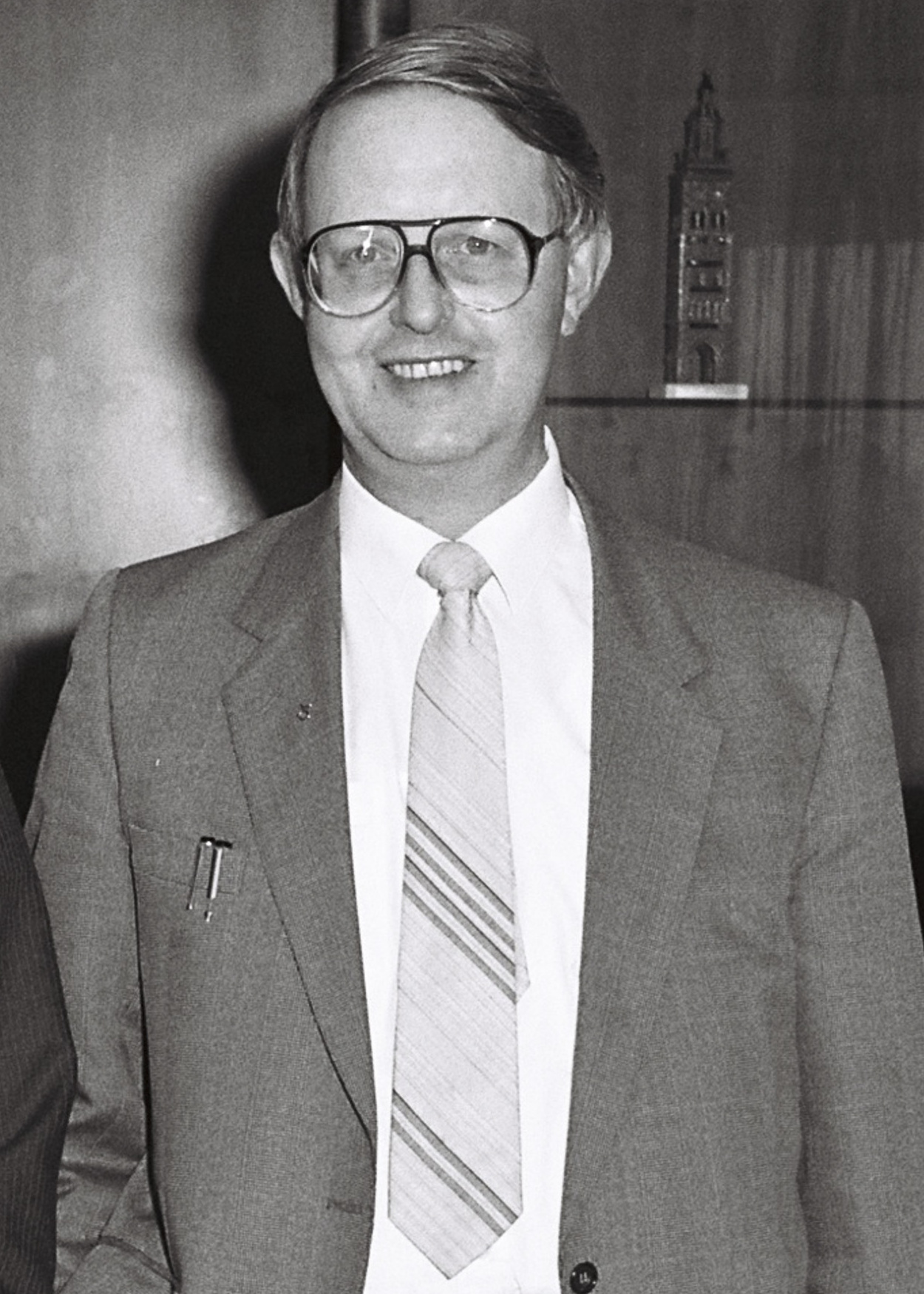

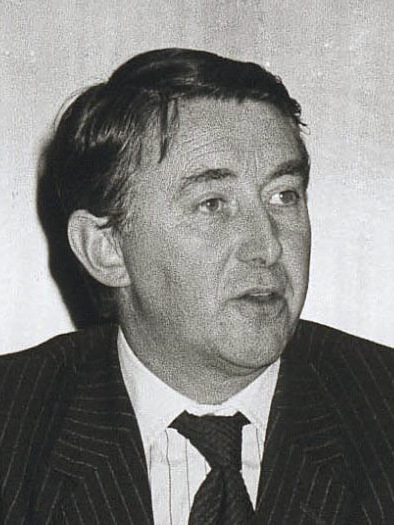
	First party	Second party
Leader	James Callaghan	Margaret Thatcher
Party	Labour	Conservative
Leader since	5 April 1976	11 February 1975
Seats won	469	232
Seat change	▲187	▼27
Popular vote	45.4%	24.1%
Swing	▲13.8%	▼3.1%
	Third party	Fourth party
Leader	Gordon Wilson	David Steel
Party	SNP	Liberal
Leader since	15 September 1979	7 July 1976
Seats won	52	33
Seat change	▼118	▼29
Popular vote	15.5%	6.2%
Swing	▼8.7%	▲2.2%
- Colours denote the winning party with outright control

Elections for the Scottish district councils were held in 1980.

These were the third elections held to the 53 district councils established by the Local Government (Scotland) Act 1973. The previous elections had been held in 1977. The elections took place a year after the Conservative government of Margaret Thatcher had come to power. The local elections, which also took place in England and Wales, were seen as the first electoral test of the Thatcher ministry.

== Background ==
The poll was held on 1 May and all 1,182 district council seats were to be filled. Districts formed the second tier in local government in Scotland under the 1975 reorganisation, with regional councils forming the upper tier. It was intended that elections would normally take place on a four-year cycle. Regional elections were also to be on a four-year cycle, held midway between district elections.

== Party performance ==
Labour had a very good electoral performance, more than regaining the ground they had lost at the 1977 elections. They gained 18 councils: 3 from the Scottish National Party, one from Liberals and 14 from no overall control. Notable gains were the cities of Aberdeen, Dundee and Glasgow. The Conservatives suffered the loss of Edinburgh but held another six councils. The SNP vote collapsed and they lost control of the three councils they controlled. In a number of councils all of the party's sitting councillors were defeated, most notably in Glasgow where they lost all 16 seats they held. The Liberal Party lost the only council they controlled.

Summary of the 1980 Scottish District local council election results
Parties	Votes	Votes %	Wards
Labour		45.4	469
Conservative		24.1	232
SNP		15.5	52
Liberal		6.2	33
Independent/Other		8.9	
Total			

== Results by region ==
The seats on each council before and after the election were as follows:

=== Borders ===
District	Labour	Conservative	Liberal	Independent	Other	Control
Berwickshire	1 (+1)	11 (−1)	0	0	0	Conservative hold
Ettrick and Lauderdale	0	1	0 (−1)	14 (+1)	0	Independent hold
Roxburgh	0 (−1)	5 (+3)	0	11 (−2)	0	Independent hold
Tweeddale	0	0	0	10	0	Independent hold

=== Central ===
District	Labour	Conservative	SNP	Liberal	Independent	Other	Control
Clackmannan	7 (+3)	1	4 (−3)	0	0	0	Labour gain from SNP
Falkirk	27 (+19)	2	4 (−17)	0	2 (−1)	Independent Labour 1 Independent Scottish Nationalist 0 (−1)	Labour gain from SNP
Stirling	10 (+3)	9	0 (−3)	0	1 (+1)	Independent Conservative 0 (−1)	Labour gain from NOC

=== Dumfries and Galloway ===
District	Labour	Conservative	SNP	Independent	Control
Annandale and Eskdale	0	0	0	16	Independent hold
Nithsdale	5 (+1)	5 (+5)	4	14 (−6)	Independent hold
Stewartry	0	0	0	12	Independent hold
Wigtown	0	0	0	14	Independent hold

=== Fife ===
District	Labour	Conservative	SNP	Liberal	Independent	Other	Control
Dunfermline	22 (+3)	5 (−2)	1 (−1)	1 (+1)	1 (−1)	0	Labour hold
Kirkcaldy	23 (+7)	3 (−2)	4 (−4)	0	3	Ratepayers 3 (−1)	Labour gain from NOC
North-East Fife	5 (+4)	11 (−5)	0	0	2 (+1)	0	Conservative hold

=== Grampian ===
District	Labour	Conservative	SNP	Liberal	Independent	Control
Banff and Buchan	1 (+1)	0	5 (+4)	0	12 (−5)	Independent hold
City of Aberdeen	27 (+5)	13 (−2)	0 (−2)	8 (−1)	0	Labour gain from NOC
Gordon	0	3	0	3	6	No overall control
Kincardine and Deeside	0	2 (−1)	0	1 (+1)	9	Independent hold
Moray	0	0	3 (−1)	0	15 (+1)	Independent hold

=== Highland ===
District	Labour	Conservative	SNP	Liberal	Independent	Control
Badenoch and Strathspey	0	0	2 (+2)	0	8 (−2)	Independent hold
Caithness‡	1	0	0	1	13	Independent hold
Inverness‡	8	0	1	2	17	Independent hold
Lochaber	4 (+1)	0	0 (−1)	0	8	Independent hold
Nairn	0	0	0 (−2)	0	10	Independent hold
Ross and Cromarty	0	1	0	0	19	Independent hold
Skye and Lochalsh 2 vacancies	0	0	0	0	9	Independent hold
Sutherland 1 vacancy	0	0	0	0	13	Independent hold

‡ Changes in ward boundaries

=== Lothian ===
District	Labour	Conservative	SNP	Liberal	Independent	Control
City of Edinburgh‡	25	31	2	2	2	Conservatives lose to NOC
East Lothian	10	7	0	0	0	Labour hold
Midlothian	13 (+6)	0 (−1)	0 (−4)	1 (+1)	1 (−1)	Labour gain from NOC
West Lothian	15 (+7)	0	4 (−6)	0	2 (−1)	Labour gain from NOC

‡ Changes in ward boundaries

=== Strathclyde ===
District	Labour	Conservative	SNP	Liberal	Independent	Others	Control
Argyll and Bute	1 (+1)	2 (−2)	3	0	20 (+1)	0	Independent hold
Bearsden and Milngavie	2 (+1)	6 (−1)	0	0	2	0	Conservative hold
Clydebank	8 (+5)	1	0 (−5)	0	0	Scottish Labour 1	Labour gain from NOC
Cumbernauld and Kilsyth	6 (+1)	0	4 (−1)	0	0	0	Labour gain from SNP
Cumnock and Doon Valley	8 (+2)	0 (−1)	0	0	2	0	Labour hold
Cunninghame‡	21	5	2	0	1	Moderate Conservatives 1	Labour gain from NOC
Dumbarton	8 (+4)	3 (−1)	2 (−2)	0	2 (−1)	0	Labour gain from NOC
East Kilbride	12 (+8)	2	1 (−6)	0	0 (−2)	0	Labour gain from NOC
Eastwood	0	10	0	0	0	Ratepayers 2	Conservative hold
City of Glasgow	58 (+26)	11 (−12)	0 (−16)	3 (+2)	0	0	Labour gain from NOC
Hamilton	17 (+7)	1	0 (−6)	2	0 (−1)	0	Labour hold
Inverclyde	13 (+5)	1	0 (−1)	9 (−4)	0	0	Labour gain from Liberals
Kilmarnock and Loudoun	11 (+4)	5 (−2)	0 (−2)	0	0	0	Labour gain from NOC
Kyle and Carrick	13 (+6)	12 (−5)	0 (−1)	0	0	0	Labour gain from NOC
Lanark	5 (+1)	0	2 (−1)	0	0	Independent Progressives 7	NOC
Motherwell	21 (+2)	3 (−2)	3	0 (−1)	01 (=1)	Communist 1	Labour hold
Monklands	18 (+5)	3 (−3)	0 (−1)	0	0 (−1)	0	Labour hold
Renfrew	34 (+20)	4 (-7)	1 (-10)	0	1 (-2)	Independent Labour 0 (-1)	Labour gain from NOC
Strathkelvin	10 (+6)	4	0 (−6)	0	0	0	Labour gain from NOC

=== Tayside ===
District	Labour	Conservative	SNP	Liberal	Independent	Others	Control
Angus	3	12 (+1)	0	0	7 (−1)	0	Conservative hold
City of Dundee	25 (+4)	26 (−2)	0	0	1 (−1)	Ratepayer-Conservatives 11 (−1); Independent Ratepayers-Conservatives 1 (+1); Progressive Conservatives 0 (−1)	Labour gain from NOC
Perth and Kinross	5 (+2)	19 (−2)	1	1 (+1)	3 (−1)	0	Conservative hold
