= 1974 United Kingdom local elections =

- 2 May & 7 May 1974

All 32 London boroughs, all 53 Scottish districts and all 12 Scottish regions
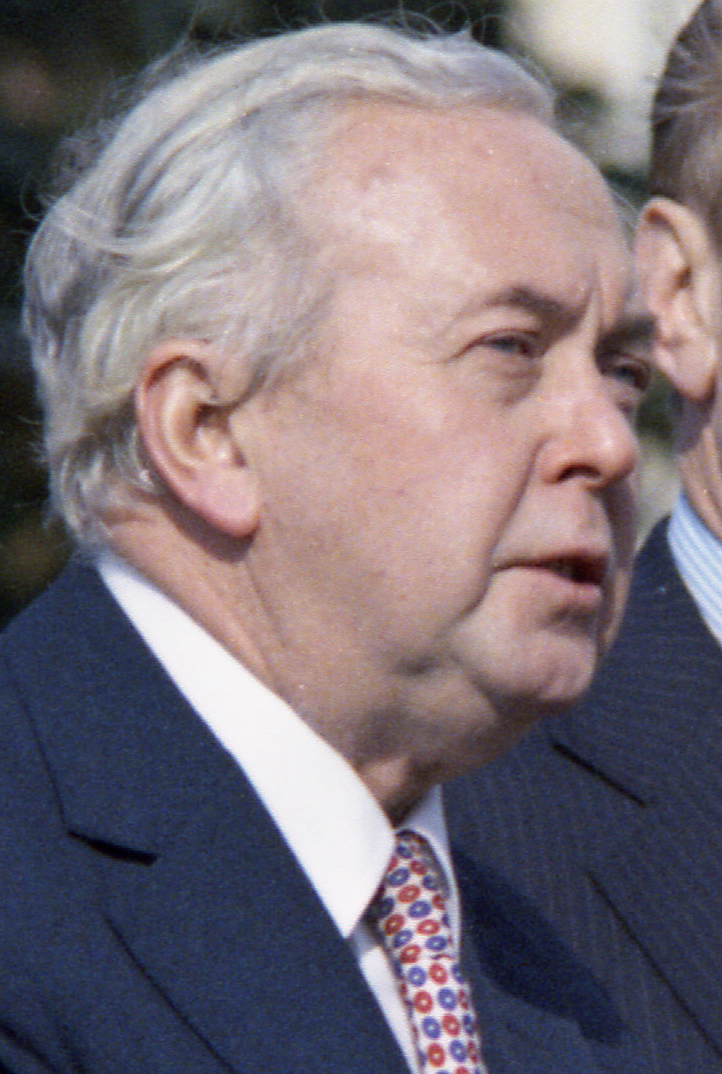

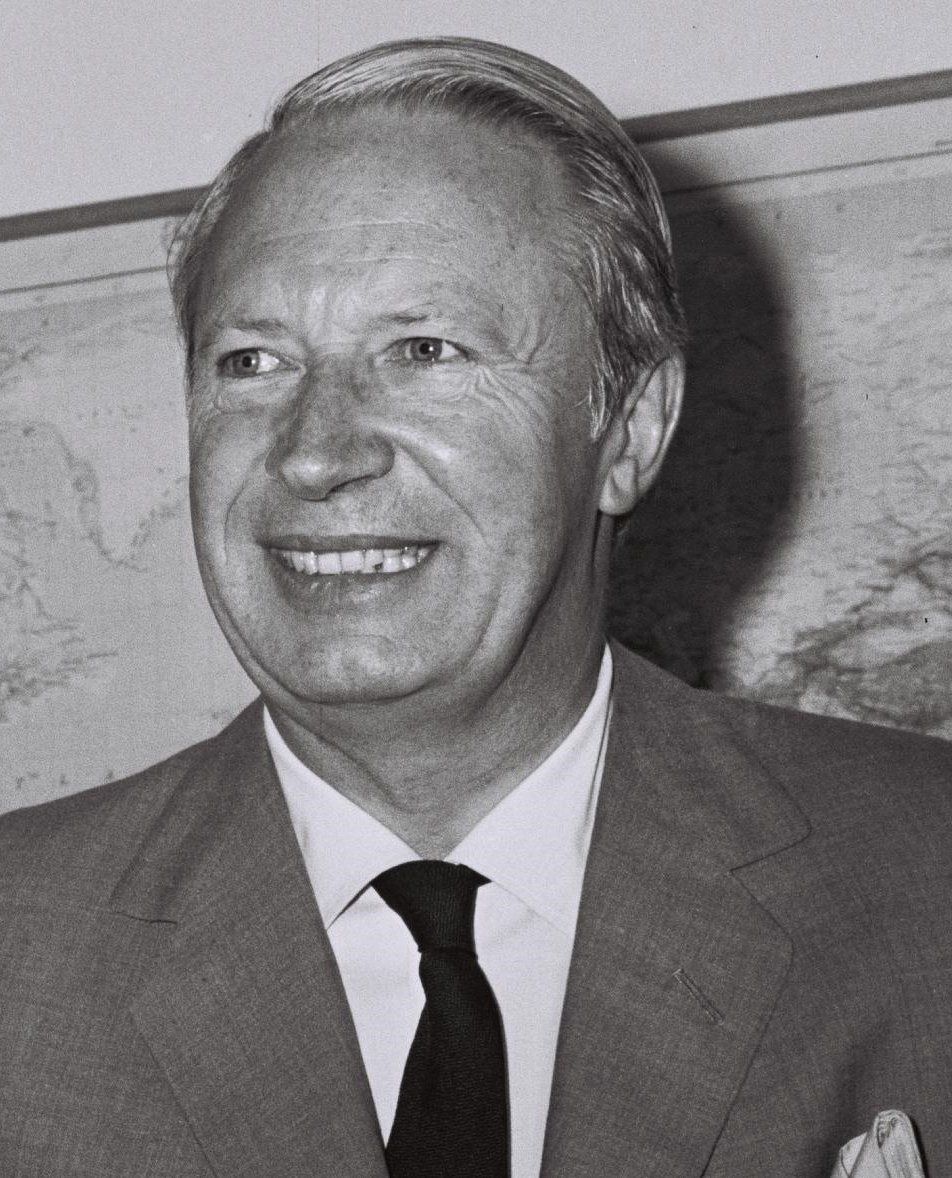
	Majority party	Minority party	Third party
			Lib
Leader	Harold Wilson	Edward Heath	Jeremy Thorpe
Party	Labour	Conservative	Liberal
Leader since	14 February 1963	28 July 1965	18 January 1967
Councils	18	13
Councillors	10,325	8,102	1,474
Councillors +/-	▲544	▲393	▲47

Local elections were held in the United Kingdom in 1974, during the life of the minority Labour government of Harold Wilson. Elections were held in all the boroughs of London.

The number of councillors was increased, enabling all of the three largest parties to make net gains in council seats. Labour gained 544 seats and had 10,325 councillors after the elections. The Conservatives gained 393 seats, leaving them with 8,102 councillors. The Liberals gained 47 seats, giving them a total of 1,474 councillors.

In terms of council control in London, Labour won 18 councils, the Conservatives 13. One borough, Havering, was in no overall control, having been a Labour council after the 1971 local elections. The Conservatives gained Bexley and Merton from Labour and Harrow from no overall control.

In Scotland these were the first elections for the new Regional and District councils, with people voting twice. The Scottish National Party did not do particularly well compared with their performance in the two general elections that year. Labour won a majority in Strathclyde and Fife regions.

== Results ==
=== England ===
==== London boroughs ====
Council	Previous control	Result	Details
Barking	Labour	Labour hold	Details
Barnet	Conservative	Conservative hold	Details
Bexley	Labour	Conservative gain	Details
Brent	Labour	Labour hold	Details
Bromley	Conservative	Conservative hold	Details
Camden	Labour	Labour hold	Details
Croydon	Conservative	Conservative hold	Details
Ealing	Labour	Labour hold	Details
Enfield	Conservative	Conservative hold	Details
Greenwich	Labour	Labour hold	Details
Hackney	Labour	Labour hold	Details
Hammersmith	Labour	Labour hold	Details
Haringey	Labour	Labour hold	Details
Harrow	No overall control	Conservative gain	Details
Havering	Labour	No overall control gain	Details
Hillingdon	Labour	Labour hold	Details
Hounslow	Labour	Labour hold	Details
Islington	Labour	Labour hold	Details
Kensington and Chelsea	Conservative	Conservative hold	Details
Kingston upon Thames	Conservative	Conservative hold	Details
Lambeth	Labour	Labour hold	Details
Lewisham	Labour	Labour hold	Details
Merton	Labour	Conservative gain	Details
Newham	Labour	Labour hold	Details
Redbridge	Conservative	Conservative hold	Details
Richmond upon Thames	Conservative	Conservative hold	Details
Southwark	Labour	Labour hold	Details
Sutton	Conservative	Conservative hold	Details
Tower Hamlets	Labour	Labour hold	Details
Waltham Forest	Labour	Labour hold	Details
Wandsworth	Labour	Labour hold	Details
Westminster	Conservative	Conservative hold	Details

=== Scotland ===
==== District councils ====
District	Previous control	Result	Details
Aberdeen, City of	New Council	Labour	Details
Angus	New Council	Conservative	Details
Annandale and Eskdale	New Council	Independent	Details
Argyll†	New Council	Independent	Details
Badenoch and Strathspey	New Council	Independent	Details
Banff and Buchan	New Council	Independent	Details
Bearsden and Milngavie	New Council	No overall control	Details
Berwickshire	New Council	Conservative	Details
Bishopbriggs and Kirkintilloch†	New Council	No overall control	Details
Caithness	New Council	Independent	Details
Clackmannan	New Council	No overall control	Details
Clydebank	New Council	Labour	Details
Cumbernauld†	New Council	SNP	Details
Cumnock and Doon Valley	New Council	Labour	Details
Cunninghame	New Council	Labour	Details
Dumbarton	New Council	Labour	Details
Dundee, City of	New Council	No overall control	Details
Dunfermline	New Council	Labour	Details
East Kilbride	New Council	No overall control	Details
East Lothian	New Council	Labour	Details
Eastwood	New Council	Conservative	Details
Edinburgh, City of	New Council	No overall control	Details
Ettrick and Lauderdale	New Council	Independent	Details
Falkirk	New Council	No overall control	Details
Glasgow, City of	New Council	Labour	Details
Gordon	New Council	Independent	Details
Hamilton	New Council	Labour	Details
Inverclyde	New Council	Labour	Details
Inverness	New Council	Independent	Details
Kilmarnock and Loudoun	New Council	Labour	Details
Kincardine and Deeside	New Council	Independent	Details
Kirkcaldy	New Council	No overall control	Details
Kyle and Carrick	New Council	Conservative	Details
Lanark	New Council	Independent	Details
Lochaber	New Council	Independent	Details
Merrick†	New Council	Independent	Details
Midlothian	New Council	Labour	Details
Monklands	New Council	Labour	Details
Moray	New Council	Independent	Details
Motherwell	New Council	Labour	Details
Nairn	New Council	Independent	Details
Nithsdale	New Council	Independent	Details
North East Fife	New Council	Conservative	Details
Perth and Kinross	New Council	Conservative	Details
Renfrew	New Council	Labour	Details
Ross and Cromarty	New Council	Independent	Details
Roxburgh	New Council	Independent	Details
Skye and Lochalsh	New Council	Independent	Details
Stewartry	New Council	Independent	Details
Stirling	New Council	No overall control	Details
Sutherland	New Council	Independent	Details
Tweeddale	New Council	Independent	Details
West Lothian	New Council	No overall control	Details

†Four districts were renamed shortly after the elections. Argyll became Argyll and Bute, Bishopbriggs and Kirkintilloch became Strathkelvin, Cumbernauld became Cumbernauld and Kilsyth and Merrick became Wigtown.

==== Regional councils ====
Region or islands area	Previous control	Result	Details
Borders	New Council	Independent	Details
Central	New Council	Labour	Details
Dumfries and Galloway	New Council	Independent	Details
Fife	New Council	Labour	Details
Grampian	New Council	Conservative	Details
Highland	New Council	Independent	Details
Lothian	New Council	No overall control	Details
Orkney	New Council	Independent	Details
Shetland	New Council	Independent	Details
Strathclyde	New Council	Labour	Details
Tayside	New Council	No overall control	Details
Western Isles	New Council	Independent	Details
