= 1974 Angus District Council election =

Angus District Council election

7 May 1974	1977 →

All 22 seats to Angus District Council 13 seats needed for a majority
	First party	Second party	Third party
	Ind	Con	Lab
Party	Independent	Conservative	Labour
Seats won	10	9	3
Popular vote	6,312	9,710	4,797
Percentage	30.3%	46.6%	23.0%
Council Leader after election
Labour

Elections to Angus District Council were held on 7 May 1974, on the same day as the other Scottish local government elections. This was the first election to the district council following the implementation of the Local Government (Scotland) Act 1973.

The election used the 22 wards created by the Formation Electoral Arrangements in 1974. Each ward elected one councillor using first-past-the-post voting.

The council was in no overall control after no party won enough seats to form a majority administration. Independent candidates won 10 seats and the Conservatives – who took the most votes – won nine seats. The remaining three seats were won by Labour.

== Background ==
Prior to 1974, Angus was one of 33 counties in Scotland. Within the county boundaries were seven burghs – one large (Arbroath) and six small (Brechin, Carnoustie, Forfar, Kirriemuir, Monifieth and Montrose). The small burghs had limited powers which included some control over planning as well as local taxation, building control, housing, lighting and drainage. The large burgh had further powers over the police, public health, social services, registration of births, marriages and deaths and electoral registration. The rest of the local government responsibility fell to the county council which had full control over the areas which were not within a burgh.

Following the recommendations in the Wheatly Report, the old system of counties and burghs – which had resulted in a mishmash of local government areas in which some small burghs had larger populations but far fewer responsibilities than some large burghs and even counties – was to be replaced by a new system of regional and district councils. The Local Government (Scotland) Act 1973 implemented most of the recommendations in the Wheatly Report. The new Angus district included most of the area of the former county except an area around Dundee including Monifieth which was transferred to the city. Angus was placed within the Tayside region.

== Election results ==
1974 Angus District Council election result
Party	Seats	Gains	Losses	Net gain/loss	Seats %	Votes %	Votes	+/−
Independent	10				45.5	30.3	6,312	
Conservative	9				40.9	46.6	9,710	
Labour	3				13.6	23.0	4,797	

== Ward results ==
Harbour
Party	Candidate	Votes	%
Conservative	Jane S. Cuthill	746	70.6
Labour	J. Le Blond	310	29.4
Majority		436	41.3
Turnout		1,056	42.8

Abbey
Party	Candidate	Votes	%
Labour	G. S. Cargill	799	65.3
Conservative	Caroline H. Florence	424	34.7
Majority		375	30.7
Turnout		1,223	46.4

Timmergreeens and Carmyllie
Party	Candidate	Votes	%
Labour	N. L. Geaughan	924	54.8
Conservative	J. O'Reily	761	45.2
Majority		163	9.7
Turnout		1,685	50.8

Keptie
Party	Candidate	Votes	%
Conservative	Helen Cargill	1,186	72.2
Labour	W. J. Irving	456	27.8
Majority		730	44.5
Turnout		1,642	53.7

Hayshead and St. Vigeans
Party	Candidate	Votes	%
Conservative	A. B. Howie	788	61.1
Labour	M. B. Kerr	501	38.9
Majority		287	22.3
Turnout		1,289	42.3

Cliffburn
Party	Candidate	Votes	%
Labour	H. A. Farmer	607	58.8
Conservative	A. Gerrard	425	41.2
Majority		182	17.6
Turnout		1,032	35.1

Carnoustie West and Panmure
Party	Candidate	Votes	%
Conservative	H. G. Morton	880	61.2
Independent	A. R. Winter	314	21.9
Labour	Joan H. Haggart	243	16.9
Majority		566	
Turnout		1,461	41.8

Carnoustie East and Panbride
Party	Candidate	Votes	%
Conservative	D. Torrie	1,305	84.0
Labour	W. Campbell	214	16.0
Majority		1,056	39.3
Turnout		1,032	52.2

Forfar West
Party	Candidate	Votes	%
Independent	T. Scotland	774	63.9
Conservative	C. M. H. Rodger	438	36.1
Majority		336	27.8
Turnout		1,212	47.4

Forfar South
Party	Candidate	Votes	%
Conservative	H. MacPhail	571	41.1
Independent	R. C. Forrester	538	38.7
Labour	D. Hay	281	20.2
Majority		33	2.4
Turnout		1,390	46.7

Forfar North
Party	Candidate	Votes	%
Independent	Margaret C. Thorpe	1,292	77.4
Conservative	M. J. S. Yeaman	377	22.6
Majority		915	54.8
Turnout		1,669	60.4

Montrose Central
Party	Candidate	Votes	%
Independent	G. Norrie	Unopposed	

Montrose North
Party	Candidate	Votes	%
Independent	J. M. D. Smith	Unopposed	

Montrose South
Party	Candidate	Votes	%
Independent	W. M. Philips	Unopposed	

Kirriemuir
Party	Candidate	Votes	%
Conservative	T. J. Millar	930	48.0
Independent	D. B. Simpson	566	29.2
Independent	D. S. McMartin	441	22.8
Majority		364	18.8
Turnout		1,937	46.7

The Glens
Party	Candidate	Votes	%
Conservative	J. A. Robertson	Unopposed	

Strathbeg
Party	Candidate	Votes	%
Conservative	L. Gray-Cheape	879	73.1
Independent	P. Whitaker	323	26.9
Majority		556	46.2
Turnout		1,202	52.5

Dean
Party	Candidate	Votes	%
Independent	M. Struthers	Unopposed	

Northesk
Party	Candidate	Votes	%
Independent	D. L. I. Loyal	Unopposed	

Southesk
Party	Candidate	Votes	%
Independent	Isobel M. McLellan	894	63.6
Independent	A. Nicholl	511	36.4
Majority		383	27.2
Turnout		1,405	50.8

Brechin North
Party	Candidate	Votes	%
Independent	A. Buchan	Unopposed	

Brechin South
Party	Candidate	Votes	%
Independent	R. A. MacKenzie	659	60.7
Labour	D. K. Todd	427	39.3
Majority		232	21.4
Turnout		1,086	44.8

== Aftermath ==
Angus was left in no overall control following the election after no party won a majority of the seats. Independent candidates won the most seats at 10 and the Conservatives – who had the highest vote share – won nine seats. The remaining three seats were won by Labour. Tayside Regional Council – which held its first election on the same day – was also left in no overall control. Across Scotland, Labour won the most votes, the most seats and the most councils of any party.
