= 1974 Nithsdale District Council election =

Nithsdale District Council election

7 May 1974	1977 →

All 28 seats to Nithsdale District Council 15 seats needed for a majority
	First party	Second party	Third party
Party	Independent	Labour	Democratic Socialist Labour Party
Seats won	20	5	1
Popular vote	3,214	1,190	1,621
Percentage	52.9%	19.6%	26.7%
	Fourth party	Fifth party
Party	SNP	Conservative
Seats won	1	1
Popular vote	48	0
Percentage	0.8%	0.0%

Elections to Nithsdale District Council were held on 7 May 1974, on the same day as the other Scottish local government elections. This was the first election to the district council following the implementation of the Local Government (Scotland) Act 1973.

The election used the 28 wards created by the Formation Electoral Arrangements in 1974. Each ward elected one councillor using first-past-the-post voting.

Independent candidates took control of the council after winning a majority – 20 – of the 28 seats. Nithsdale was considered an intermediate district in terms of its partisanship as 70 per cent of councillors were not affiliated to a political party. Labour won five seats and the Democratic Socialist Labour Party, the Scottish National Party (SNP) and the Conservatives won one seat each.

== Background ==
Prior to 1974, the area that was to become Nithsdale, was split between two counties – the County of Dumfries and the County of Kirkcudbright. Within that were two of the seven burghs of the County of Dumfries. The small burgh of Sanquhar had limited powers which included some control over planning as well as local taxation, building control, housing, lighting and drainage. The large burgh of Dumfries had further powers over the police, public health, social services, registration of births, marriages and deaths and electoral registration. The rest of the local government responsibility fell to the county council which had full control over the areas which were not within a burgh.

Following the recommendations in the Wheatly Report, the old system of counties and burghs – which had resulted in a mishmash of local government areas in which some small burghs had larger populations but far fewer responsibilities than some large burghs and even counties – was to be replaced by a new system of regional and district councils. The Local Government (Scotland) Act 1973 implemented most of the recommendations in the Wheatly Report. The western part of the County of Dumfries which included the two burghs was combined with the eastern part of the County of Kirkcudbright and was placed into the Nithsdale district within the Dumfries and Galloway region.

== Results ==
1974 Nithsdale District Council election result
Party	Seats	Gains	Losses	Net gain/loss	Seats %	Votes %	Votes	+/−
Independent	20			N/A	71.4	52.9	3,214	N/A
Labour	5			N/A	17.9	19.6	1,190	N/A
Democratic Socialist Labour Party	1			N/A	3.6	26.7	1,621	N/A
SNP	1			N/A	3.6	0.8	48	N/A
Conservative	1			N/A	3.6	0.0	0	N/A

== Aftermath ==
Nithsdale, like the other three districts in Dumfries and Galloway, saw more independent candidates elected than political parties. Independents took 20 seats, Labour won five seats and both Democratic Socialist Labour Party and the Scottish National Party (SNP) won one seat. Independents also controlled the regional council which held its first election on the same day. Across Scotland, Labour won the most votes, the most seats and the most councils of any party.
