= 1974 Stirling District Council election =

Stirling District Council election

- 7 May 1974

All 20 seats to Stirling District Council 11 seats needed for a majority
	First party	Second party
Party	Conservative	Labour
Seats won	8	7
Popular vote	7,275	9,326
Percentage	25.7%	33.0%
	Third party	Fourth party
Party	SNP	Independent
Seats won	4	1
Popular vote	8,627	2,488
Percentage	30.4%	8.8%

Elections to Stirling District Council were held on 7 May 1974, on the same day as the other Scottish local government elections. This was the first election to the district council following the implementation of the Local Government (Scotland) Act 1973.

The election used the 20 wards created by the Formation Electoral Arrangements in 1974. Each ward elected one councillor using first-past-the-post voting.

The council was left in no overall control following the election. The Conservatives were the largest party after they won eight of the 20 seats. Labour took seven seats, the Scottish National Party (SNP) won four seats and one independent candidate was elected.

== Background ==
Prior to 1974, the area that was to become Stirling was split between two counties – the County of Perth and the County of Stirling. Within that were contained two of the five burghs of the County of Stirling (Bridge of Allan and Stirling) and three of the 12 burghs of the County of Perth (Callander, Doune and Dunblane). The four small burghs had limited powers which included some control over planning as well as local taxation, building control, housing, lighting and drainage. The large burgh of Stirling had further powers over the police, public health, social services, registration of births, marriages and deaths and electoral registration. The rest of the local government responsibility fell to the county council which had full control over the areas which were not within a burgh.

Following the recommendations in the Wheatly Report, the old system of counties and burghs – which had resulted in a mishmash of local government areas in which some small burghs had larger populations but far fewer responsibilities than some large burghs and even counties – was to be replaced by a new system of regional and district councils. The Local Government (Scotland) Act 1973 implemented most of the recommendations in the Wheatly Report. The northern part of the County of Stirling which included the two burghs was combined with the western part of the County of Perth which included the three burghs and was placed into the Stirling district within the Central region.

== Results ==
1974 Stirling District Council election result
Party	Seats	Gains	Losses	Net gain/loss	Seats %	Votes %	Votes	+/−
Conservative	8			N/A	40.0	25.7	7,275	N/A
Labour	7			N/A	35.0	33.0	9,326	N/A
SNP	4			N/A	20.0	30.4	8,627	N/A
Independent	1			N/A	5.0	8.8	2,488	N/A
Liberal	0			N/A	0.0	1.3	356	N/A
Independent Labour	0			N/A	0.0	0.8	222	N/A

== Aftermath ==
Stirling, like the other two districts in the newly created Central region, was left in no overall control. The Conservatives were the largest party after winning eight seats and Labour were the second-largest after they took seven seats. The Scottish National Party (SNP) won four seats and one independent candidate was elected. Labour won control of the regional council which held its first election on the same day. Across Scotland, Labour won the most votes, the most seats and the most councils of any party.
