= 1974 Perth and Kinross District Council election =

Perth and Kinross District Council election

- 7 May 1974

All 29 seats to Perth and Kinross District Council 15 seats needed for a majority
| | First party | Second party | Third party |
|---|---|---|---|
| Party | Conservative | Independent | Labour |
| Seats won | 16 | 9 | 4 |
| Popular vote | 15,443 | 11,028 | 4,375 |
| Percentage | 46.6% | 33.3% | 13.2% |

Elections to Perth and Kinross District Council were held on 7 May 1974, on the same day as the other Scottish local government elections. This was the first election to the district council following the implementation of the Local Government (Scotland) Act 1973.

The election used the 29 wards created by the Formation Electoral Arrangements in 1974. Each ward elected one councillor using first-past-the-post voting.

The Conservatives took control of the council after winning a majority. The party took 16 of the 29 seats and more than 40% of the popular vote. Nine independent candidates were elected and Labour won four seats.

== Background ==
Prior to 1974, the area that was to become Perth and Kinross was split between three counties – the County of Angus, the County of Kinross and the County of Perth. Within that were nine of the 12 burghs of the County of Perth (Aberfeldy; Abernethy; Alyth; Auchterarder; Blairgowrie and Rattray; Coupar Angus; Crieff; Perth; and Pitlochry) and the only burgh from the County of Kinross (Kinross). The nine small burghs had limited powers which included some control over planning as well as local taxation, building control, housing, lighting and drainage. The large burgh of Perth had further powers over the police, public health, social services, registration of births, marriages and deaths and electoral registration. The rest of the local government responsibility fell to the county council which had full control over the areas which were not within a burgh. Although the County of Perth and the County of Kinross remained as separate entities, they had been combined for most but not all purposes as a result of the Local Government (Scotland) Act 1929 and the Local Government (Scotland) Act 1947.

Following the recommendations in the Wheatly Report, the old system of counties and burghs – which had resulted in a mishmash of local government areas in which some small burghs had larger populations but far fewer responsibilities than some large burghs and even counties – was to be replaced by a new system of regional and district councils. The Local Government (Scotland) Act 1973 implemented most of the recommendations in the Wheatly Report. The County of Kinross which included the burgh was combined with the majority of the County of Perth including the eight burghs and a small area from neighbouring Angus and placed into the Perth and Kinross district within the Tayside region.

== Results ==
1974 Perth and Kinross District Council election result
| Party | Seats | Gains | Losses | Net gain/loss | Seats % | Votes % | Votes | +/− |
|---|---|---|---|---|---|---|---|---|
| Conservative | 16 | | | N/A | 55.2 | 46.6 | 15,443 | N/A |
| Independent | 9 | | | N/A | 31.0 | 33.3 | 11,028 | N/A |
| Labour | 4 | | | N/A | 13.8 | 13.2 | 4,375 | N/A |
| SNP | 0 | | | N/A | 0.0 | 4.7 | 1,561 | N/A |
| Liberal | 0 | | | N/A | 0.0 | 2.3 | 750 | N/A |

== Aftermath ==
Perth and Kinross was the only district in the newly created Tayside region that was won by the Conservatives after the party took 16 of the 29 seats. Nine independent candidates were elected and Labour took four seats. Tayside Regional Council – which held its first election on the same day – was left in no overall control. Across Scotland, Labour won the most votes, the most seats and the most councils of any party.
