= 1974 Merrick District Council election =

Merrick District Council election

7 May 1974	1977 →

All 14 seats to Merrick District Council 8 seats needed for a majority
	First party	Second party
Party	Independent	Tenants Association
Seats won	13	1
Popular vote	5,864	565
Percentage	83.6%	8.1%

Elections to Merrick District Council were held on 7 May 1974, on the same day as the other Scottish local government elections. This was the first election to the district council following the implementation of the Local Government (Scotland) Act 1973.

The election used the 14 wards created by the Formation Electoral Arrangements in 1974. Each ward elected one councillor using first-past-the-post voting.

Merrick was a non-partisan district. Only a few political party members contested the election and all 14 seats were won by independents.

== Background ==
Prior to 1974, the area that was to become Merrick, was split between two counties – the County of Kirkcudbright and the County of Wigtown. Within that were all four of the burghs of the County of Wigtown (Newton Stewart, Stranraer, Whithorn and Wigtown). These were all small burghs so the burgh council had limited powers which included some control over planning as well as local taxation, building control, housing, lighting and drainage with the rest of the local government responsibility falling to the county council.

Following the recommendations in the Wheatly Report, the old system of counties and burghs – which had resulted in a mishmash of local government areas in which some small burghs had larger populations but far fewer responsibilities than some large burghs and even counties – was to be replaced by a new system of regional and district councils. The Local Government (Scotland) Act 1973 implemented most of the recommendations in the Wheatly Report. The County of Wigtown which included the four burghs was combined with the western part of the County of Kirkcudbright and was placed into the Merrick district within the Dumfries and Galloway region.

== Results ==
1974 Merrick District Council election result
Party	Seats	Gains	Losses	Net gain/loss	Seats %	Votes %	Votes	+/−
Independent	13			N/A	92.9	83.6	5,864	N/A
Tenants Association	1			N/A	7.1	8.1	565	N/A
Labour	0			N/A	0.0	5.5	383	N/A
Conservative	0			N/A	0.0	2.9	201	N/A

== Aftermath ==
Merrick, like the other three districts in Dumfries and Galloway, was non-partisan and controlled by independent candidates who won all 14 seats. Independents also controlled the regional council which held its first election on the same day. Across Scotland, Labour won the most votes, the most seats and the most councils of any party.
