= 1974 Kyle and Carrick District Council election =

Kyle and Carrick District Council election

7 May 1974	1977 →

All 25 seats to Kyle and Carrick District Council 13 seats needed for a majority
	First party	Second party
Party	Conservative	Labour
Seats won	16	9
Popular vote	19,434	13,619
Percentage	57.4%	40.2%

Elections to Kyle and Carrick District Council were held on 7 May 1974, on the same day as the other Scottish local government elections. This was the first election to the district council following the implementation of the Local Government (Scotland) Act 1973.

The election used the 25 wards created by the Formation Electoral Arrangements in 1974. Each ward elected one councillor using first-past-the-post voting.

The Conservatives took control of the council after winning a majority. The party took 16 of the 25 seats and more than half of the popular vote. The remaining nine seats were won by Labour.

== Background ==
Prior to 1974, the area that was to become Kyle and Carrick included five of the 17 burghs of the County of Ayr. The four small burghs (Girvan, Maybole, Prestwick and Troon) had limited powers which included some control over planning as well as local taxation, building control, housing, lighting and drainage. The large burgh of Ayr had further powers over the police, public health, social services, registration of births, marriages and deaths and electoral registration. The rest of the local government responsibility fell to the county council which had full control over the areas which were not within a burgh.

Following the recommendations in the Wheatly Report, the old system of counties and burghs – which had resulted in a mishmash of local government areas in which some small burghs had larger populations but far fewer responsibilities than some large burghs and even counties – was to be replaced by a new system of regional and district councils. The Local Government (Scotland) Act 1973 implemented most of the recommendations in the Wheatly Report. The southern part of the County of Ayr which included the five burghs was placed into the Kyle and Carrick district within the Strathclyde region.

== Results ==
1974 Kyle and Carrick District Council election result
Party	Seats	Gains	Losses	Net gain/loss	Seats %	Votes %	Votes	+/−
Conservative	16			N/A	64.0	57.4	19,434	N/A
Labour	9			N/A	36.0	40.2	13,619	N/A
Independent	0			N/A	0.0	1.8	623	N/A
Independent Labour	0			N/A	0.0	0.5	168	N/A

== Aftermath ==
Kyle and Carrick was one of two districts in the newly created Strathclyde region that was won by the Conservatives after the party took 16 of the 25 seats. The remaining nine seats were won by Labour. Labour won control of the regional council which held its first election on the same day. Across Scotland, Labour won the most votes, the most seats and the most councils of any party.
