= 1974 West Lothian District Council election =

West Lothian District Council election

- 7 May 1974

All 21 seats to West Lothian District Council 11 seats needed for a majority
| | First party | Second party |
|---|---|---|
| | Lab | SNP |
| Party | Labour | SNP |
| Seats won | 12 | 6 |
| Popular vote | 16,827 | 16,434 |
| Percentage | 41.4% | 40.5% |
| | Third party | Fourth party |
| | Ind | Ra |
| Party | Independent | Ratepayers |
| Seats won | 2 | 1 |
| Popular vote | 3,035 | 2,201 |
| Percentage | 7.5% | 5.4% |
- Council composition following the election

Elections to West Lothian District Council were held on 7 May 1974, on the same day as the other Scottish local government elections. This was the first election to the district council following the implementation of the Local Government (Scotland) Act 1973.

The election used the 21 wards created by the Formation Electoral Arrangements in 1974. Each ward elected one councillor using first-past-the-post voting.

Labour took control of the council after winning a majority. The party took 12 of the 21 seats and more than 40% of the popular vote. The Scottish National Party (SNP) won six seats and two independent candidates were elected.

== Background ==
Prior to 1974, the area that was to become West Lothian was split between two counties – Midlothian and West Lothian. Within that were four of the six burghs of West Lothian (Armadale, Bathgate, Linlithgow and Whitburn). These were all small burghs so had limited powers which included some control over planning as well as local taxation, building control, housing, lighting and drainage. The rest of the local government responsibility fell to the county council which had full control over the areas which were not within a burgh.

Following the recommendations in the Wheatly Report, the old system of counties and burghs – which had resulted in a mishmash of local government areas in which some small burghs had larger populations but far fewer responsibilities than some large burghs and even counties – was to be replaced by a new system of regional and district councils. The Local Government (Scotland) Act 1973 implemented most of the recommendations in the Wheatly Report. The western part of West Lothian which included the four burghs was combined with the western part of Midlothian and was placed into the West Lothian district within the Lothian region.

== Results ==
1974 West Lothian District Council election result
| Party | Seats | Gains | Losses | Net gain/loss | Seats % | Votes % | Votes | +/− |
|---|---|---|---|---|---|---|---|---|
| Labour | 12 | | | N/A | 57.1 | 41.4 | 16,827 | N/A |
| SNP | 6 | | | N/A | 28.6 | 40.5 | 16,434 | N/A |
| Independent | 2 | | | N/A | 9.5 | 7.5 | 3,035 | N/A |
| Ratepayers | 1 | | | N/A | 4.8 | 5.4 | 2,201 | N/A |
| Tenants Association | 0 | | | N/A | 0.0 | 1.5 | 598 | N/A |
| Independent Labour | 0 | | | N/A | 0.0 | 1.5 | 594 | N/A |
| Communist | 0 | | | N/A | 0.0 | 1.4 | 574 | N/A |
| Liberal | 0 | | | N/A | 0.0 | 0.9 | 353 | N/A |

== Ward results ==
=== Bathville ===
| Party | Candidate | Votes | % |
|---|---|---|---|
| Labour | C. King | 936 | 55.7 |
| SNP | F. Peace | 744 | 44.3 |
| Majority | | 192 | 11.4 |
| Turnout | | 1,680 | 56.9 |
| Labour win (new seat) | | | |

=== Barbauchlaw ===
| Party | Candidate | Votes | % |
|---|---|---|---|
| Labour | J. McNeil | 1,305 | 59.5 |
| SNP | J. Sibbald | 890 | 40.6 |
| Majority | | 415 | 18.9 |
| Turnout | | 2,195 | 58.0 |
| Labour win (new seat) | | | |

=== Blackridge ===
| Party | Candidate | Votes | % |
|---|---|---|---|
| SNP | R. Sim | 1,110 | 51.3 |
| Labour | F. Peace | 743 | 34.4 |
| Independent | Jessie Dawson | 310 | 14.3 |
| Majority | | 367 | 16.9 |
| Turnout | | 2,164 | 66.7 |
| SNP win (new seat) | | | |

=== Bathgate West ===
| Party | Candidate | Votes | % |
|---|---|---|---|
| Labour | A. Mackie | 725 | 39.6 |
| Ratepayers | W. Farquhar | 721 | 39.4 |
| SNP | T. Forrest | 345 | 18.9 |
| Communist | A. Hendry | 38 | 2.1 |
| Majority | | 4 | 0.2 |
| Turnout | | 1,829 | 53.9 |
| Labour win (new seat) | | | |

=== Bathgate Central ===
| Party | Candidate | Votes | % |
|---|---|---|---|
| Ratepayers | J. Walker | 1,027 | 51.4 |
| Labour | Elizabeth Haluch | 491 | 24.6 |
| SNP | A. Beveridge | 462 | 23.1 |
| Communist | A. Hendry | 20 | 1.0 |
| Majority | | 536 | 26.8 |
| Turnout | | 2,000 | 62.5 |
| Ratepayers win (new seat) | | | |

=== Bathgate East ===
| Party | Candidate | Votes | % |
|---|---|---|---|
| SNP | J. Clark | 639 | 39.5 |
| Labour | R. McLaughlin | 487 | 30.1 |
| Ratepayers | T. Slater | 453 | 28.0 |
| Communist | E. Atkinson | 40 | 2.5 |
| Majority | | 152 | 9.4 |
| Turnout | | 1,619 | 48.3 |
| SNP win (new seat) | | | |

=== Whitburn West ===
| Party | Candidate | Votes | % |
|---|---|---|---|
| Labour | R. Gamble | 895 | 46.1 |
| SNP | Georgina McBride | 556 | 28.6 |
| Independent Labour | J. Brown | 491 | 25.3 |
| Majority | | 339 | 17.5 |
| Turnout | | 1,942 | 54.0 |
| Labour win (new seat) | | | |

=== Whitburn East ===
| Party | Candidate | Votes | % |
|---|---|---|---|
| Labour | J. Clark | 1,017 | 50.3 |
| SNP | R. Duncan | 1,003 | 49.7 |
| Majority | | 14 | 0.3 |
| Turnout | | 1,020 | 53.1 |
| Labour win (new seat) | | | |

=== Fauldhouse ===
| Party | Candidate | Votes | % |
|---|---|---|---|
| Labour | A. Russell | 1,134 | 49.5 |
| Tenants Association | W. Russell | 598 | 26.1 |
| SNP | R. Forsyth | 525 | 22.9 |
| Communist | W. McKay | 35 | 1.5 |
| Majority | | 536 | 23.4 |
| Turnout | | 2,292 | 59.5 |
| Labour win (new seat) | | | |

=== Stoneyburn ===
| Party | Candidate | Votes | % |
|---|---|---|---|
| Labour | Christina Haggarty | 767 | 42.4 |
| SNP | J. McLaren | 737 | 40.8 |
| Communist | W. McMahon | 303 | 16.8 |
| Majority | | 30 | 1.6 |
| Turnout | | 1,807 | 56.7 |
| Labour win (new seat) | | | |

=== West Calder ===
| Party | Candidate | Votes | % |
|---|---|---|---|
| Labour | D. McCauley | 1,162 | 42.5 |
| SNP | D. Gallacher | 1,002 | 36.6 |
| Liberal | W.J. Boyd | 353 | 12.9 |
| Communist | W. O'Byrne | 114 | 4.2 |
| Independent Labour | J. Thomas | 103 | 3.8 |
| Majority | | 160 | 5.9 |
| Turnout | | 2,737 | 61.5 |
| Labour win (new seat) | | | |

=== Mid Calder ===
| Party | Candidate | Votes | % |
|---|---|---|---|
| Independent | W.S.C. Renwick | 808 | 40.5 |
| Labour | W.S. Auldjo | 659 | 33.0 |
| SNP | R. Penreigh | 527 | 26.4 |
| Majority | | 149 | 7.5 |
| Turnout | | 1,994 | 51.0 |
| Independent win (new seat) | | | |

=== Linlithgow ===
| Party | Candidate | Votes | % |
|---|---|---|---|
| Independent | J. Clark | 1,153 | 58.5 |
| SNP | Elizabeth MacPherson | 803 | 40.8 |
| Majority | | 350 | 17.7 |
| Turnout | | 1,956 | 44.2 |
| Independent win (new seat) | | | |

=== Northern ===
| Party | Candidate | Votes | % |
|---|---|---|---|
| Labour | W. Alexander | Unopposed | |
| Labour win (new seat) | | | |

=== Uphall ===
| Party | Candidate | Votes | % |
|---|---|---|---|
| SNP | W. McCabe | 913 | 42.6 |
| Labour | J. Cumming | 769 | 35.9 |
| Independent | Christina Grieve | 461 | 21.5 |
| Majority | | 144 | 6.7 |
| Turnout | | 2,143 | 50.2 |
| SNP win (new seat) | | | |

=== Strathbrok ===
| Party | Candidate | Votes | % |
|---|---|---|---|
| SNP | R. Sutherland | 1,066 | 60.0 |
| Labour | Elizabeth MacPherson | 710 | 40.0 |
| Majority | | 356 | 10.0 |
| Turnout | | 1,776 | 50.2 |
| SNP win (new seat) | | | |

=== Cawburn ===
| Party | Candidate | Votes | % |
|---|---|---|---|
| Labour | Agnes Hamilton | 1,223 | 49.7 |
| SNP | D. Duke | 936 | 38.0 |
| Independent | J McCann | 303 | 12.3 |
| Majority | | 387 | 11.7 |
| Turnout | | 2,462 | 62.0 |
| Labour win (new seat) | | | |

=== Craigshill ===
| Party | Candidate | Votes | % |
|---|---|---|---|
| SNP | E.G. Knight | 1,331 | 65.6 |
| Labour | Violet W. Cunningham | 698 | 34.4 |
| Majority | | 633 | 31.2 |
| Turnout | | 2,029 | 39.3 |
| SNP win (new seat) | | | |

=== Almond ===
| Party | Candidate | Votes | % |
|---|---|---|---|
| Labour | W. Connolly | 1,038 | 54.8 |
| SNP | M. McGregor | 855 | 45.2 |
| Majority | | 183 | 9.6 |
| Turnout | | 1,893 | 63.0 |
| Labour win (new seat) | | | |

=== Blackburn ===
| Party | Candidate | Votes | % |
|---|---|---|---|
| Labour | W. Russell | 857 | 55.9 |
| SNP | J. Lambie | 653 | 42.6 |
| Communist | F. McGivern | 24 | 1.6 |
| Majority | | 204 | 13.3 |
| Turnout | | 1,534 | 57.3 |
| Labour win (new seat) | | | |

=== Carmondean ===
| Party | Candidate | Votes | % |
|---|---|---|---|
| SNP | T. Wood | 1,337 | 52.5 |
| Labour | P. Easton | 1,211 | 47.5 |
| Majority | | 126 | 5.0 |
| Turnout | | 2,548 | 41.8 |
| SNP win (new seat) | | | |

== Aftermath ==
West Lothian was one of three districts in the newly created Lothian region that was won by Labour. The Scottish National Party (SNP) were the second-largest party after winning six seats. Two independent candidates were elected and one ratepayers' candidate was elected. Labour were the largest party on the regional council which held its first election on the same day but no party claimed a majority. Across Scotland, Labour won the most votes, the most seats and the most councils of any party.
