= 1974 Roxburgh District Council election =

Roxburgh District Council election

7 May 1974	1977 →

All 16 seats to Roxburgh District Council 9 seats needed for a majority
	First party
Party	Independent
Seats won	16
Popular vote	1,619
Percentage	100.0%

Elections to Roxburgh District Council were held on 7 May 1974, on the same day as the other Scottish local government elections. This was the first election to the district council following the implementation of the Local Government (Scotland) Act 1973.

The election used the 16 wards created by the Formation Electoral Arrangements in 1974. Each ward elected one councillor using first-past-the-post voting.

Roxburgh was a non-partisan district. No political party contested the election and all of the 16 seats were won by independents.

== Background ==
Prior to 1974, the area that was to become Roxburgh included three of the four burghs of the County of Roxburgh (Hawick, Jedburgh and Kelso). These were all small burghs so the burgh council had limited powers which included some control over planning as well as local taxation, building control, housing, lighting and drainage with the rest of the local government responsibility falling to the county council.

Following the recommendations in the Wheatly Report, the old system of counties and burghs – which had resulted in a mishmash of local government areas in which some small burghs had larger populations but far fewer responsibilities than some large burghs and even counties – was to be replaced by a new system of regional and district councils. The Local Government (Scotland) Act 1973 implemented most of the recommendations in the Wheatly Report. The southern part of the County of Roxburgh which included the three burghs was placed into the Roxburgh district within the Borders region.

== Results ==
1974 Roxburgh District Council election result
Party	Seats	Gains	Losses	Net gain/loss	Seats %	Votes %	Votes	+/−
Independent	16			N/A	100.0	100.0	1,619	N/A

== Aftermath ==
Roxburgh, like two of the other three districts in the Borders, was non-partisan and controlled by independent candidates who won all 16 seats. Independents also controlled the regional council which held its first election on the same day. Across Scotland, Labour won the most votes, the most seats and the most councils of any party.
