= 1974 Lochaber District Council election =

Lochaber District Council election

7 May 1974	1977 →

All 12 seats to Lochaber District Council 7 seats needed for a majority

	First party	Second party
Party	Independent	Labour
Seats won	10	2
Popular vote	2,396	302
Percentage	88.8%	11.2%
Council Control after election
Independent

Elections to Lochaber District Council were held on 7 May 1974, on the same day as the other Scottish local government elections. This was the first election to the district council following the implementation of the Local Government (Scotland) Act 1973.

The election used the 12 wards created by the Formation Electoral Arrangements in 1974. Each ward elected one councillor using first-past-the-post voting.

Lochaber was a non-partisan district. Only a few political party members contested the election and all but two of the 12 seats were won by independents. The remaining two seats were won by Labour.

== Background ==
Prior to 1974, the area that was to become Lochaber, was split between two counties – the County of Argyll and the County of Inverness. Within that was one of the three burghs of the County of Inverness. As a small burgh, the burgh council in Fort William had limited powers which included some control over planning as well as local taxation, building control, housing, lighting and drainage with the rest of the local government responsibility falling to the county council.

Following the recommendations in the Wheatly Report, the old system of counties and burghs – which had resulted in a mishmash of local government areas in which some small burghs had larger populations but far fewer responsibilities than some large burghs and even counties – was to be replaced by a new system of regional and district councils. The Local Government (Scotland) Act 1973 implemented most of the recommendations in the Wheatly Report. The northern part of the County of Argyll was combined with the southern part of the County of Inverness which included Fort William as well as the Small Isles and was placed into the Lochaber district within the Highland region.

== Results ==
1974 Lochaber District Council election result
Party	Seats	Gains	Losses	Net gain/loss	Seats %	Votes %	Votes	+/−
Independent	10			N/A		88.8	2,396	N/A
Labour	2			N/A		11.2	302	N/A

== Aftermath ==
Lochaber, like the other seven districts in Highland, was non-partisan and controlled by independent candidates who won all but two of the 12 seats. The remaining seats were won by Labour. Independents also controlled the regional council which held its first election on the same day. Across Scotland, Labour won the most votes, the most seats and the most councils of any party.
