= 1974 Badenoch and Strathspey District Council election =

Badenoch and Strathspey District Council election

- 7 May 1974

All 10 seats to Badenoch and Strathspey District Council 6 seats needed for a majority
	First party
	Ind
Party	Independent
Seats won	10
Popular vote	1,887
Percentage	100.0%
Council Leader after election
Independent

Elections to Badenoch and Strathspey District Council were held on 7 May 1974, on the same day as the other Scottish local government elections. This was the first election to the district council following the implementation of the Local Government (Scotland) Act 1973.

The election used the 10 wards created by the Formation Electoral Arrangements in 1974. Each ward elected one councillor using first-past-the-post voting.

Badenoch and Strathspey was a non-partisan district. No political party contested the election and all 10 seats were won by independents.

== Background ==
Prior to 1974, the area that was to become Badenoch and Strathspey, was split between two counties – the County of Inverness and the County of Moray. Within that were one of the three burghs of the County of Inverness (Kingussie) and one of the six burghs of the County of Moray (Grantown-on-Spey). These were all small burghs so the burgh council had limited powers which included some control over planning as well as local taxation, building control, housing, lighting and drainage with the rest of the local government responsibility falling to the county council.

Following the recommendations in the Wheatly Report, the old system of counties and burghs – which had resulted in a mishmash of local government areas in which some small burghs had larger populations but far fewer responsibilities than some large burghs and even counties – was to be replaced by a new system of regional and district councils. The Local Government (Scotland) Act 1973 implemented most of the recommendations in the Wheatly Report. The southern part of the County of Moray which included the burgh of Grantown-on-Spey was combined with the southwestern part of the County of Inverness and was placed into the Badenoch and Strathspey district within the Highland region.

== Results ==
1974 Badenoch and Strathspey District Council election result
Party	Seats	Gains	Losses	Net gain/loss	Seats %	Votes %	Votes	+/−
Independent	10				100.0	100.0	1,887	

== Aftermath ==
Badenoch and Strathspey, like the other seven districts in Highland, was non-partisan and controlled by Independent candidates who won all 10 seats. Independents also controlled the regional council which held its first election on the same day. Across Scotland, Labour won the most votes, the most seats and the most councils of any party.
