= 1974 Stewartry District Council election =

Stewartry District Council election

7 May 1974	1977 →

All 12 seats to Stewartry District Council 7 seats needed for a majority
	First party
Party	Independent
Seats won	12
Popular vote	5,906
Percentage	100.0%

Elections to Stewartry District Council were held on 7 May 1974, on the same day as the other Scottish local government elections. This was the first election to the district council following the implementation of the Local Government (Scotland) Act 1973.

The election used the 12 wards created by the Formation Electoral Arrangements in 1974. Each ward elected one councillor using first-past-the-post voting.

Stewartry was a non-partisan district. No political party contested the election and all of the 12 seats were won by independents.

== Background ==
Prior to 1974, the area that was to become Stewartry included all five burghs of the County of Kirkcudbright (Castle Douglas, Dalbeattie, Gatehouse of Fleet, Kirkcudbright and New Galloway). These were all small burghs so the burgh council had limited powers which included some control over planning as well as local taxation, building control, housing, lighting and drainage with the rest of the local government responsibility falling to the county council.

Following the recommendations in the Wheatly Report, the old system of counties and burghs – which had resulted in a mishmash of local government areas in which some small burghs had larger populations but far fewer responsibilities than some large burghs and even counties – was to be replaced by a new system of regional and district councils. The Local Government (Scotland) Act 1973 implemented most of the recommendations in the Wheatly Report. The central part of the County of Kirkcudbright which included the five burghs was placed into the Stewartry district within the Dumfries and Galloway region.

== Results ==
1974 Stewartry District Council election result
Party	Seats	Gains	Losses	Net gain/loss	Seats %	Votes %	Votes	+/−
Independent	12			N/A	100.0	100.0	5,906	N/A

== Aftermath ==
Stewartry, like the other four districts in Dumfries and Galloway, was non-partisan and controlled by independent candidates who won all 12 seats. Independents also controlled the regional council which held its first election on the same day. Across Scotland, Labour won the most votes, the most seats and the most councils of any party.
