= 1974 Ettrick and Lauderdale District Council election =

Ettrick and Lauderdale District Council election

7 May 1974	1977 →

All 16 seats to Ettrick and Lauderdale District Council 9 seats needed for a majority
	First party	Second party	Third party
Party	Independent	Labour	Conservative
Seats won	14	1	1
Popular vote	5,674	439	271
Percentage	88.9%	6.9%	4.2%

Elections to Ettrick and Lauderdale District Council were held on 7 May 1974, on the same day as the other Scottish local government elections. This was the first election to the district council following the implementation of the Local Government (Scotland) Act 1973.

The election used the 16 wards created by the Formation Electoral Arrangements in 1974. Each ward elected one councillor using first-past-the-post voting.

Ettrick and Lauderdale was a non-partisan district. Only a few political party members contested the election and all but two of the 16 seats were won by independent candidates. Both Labour and the Conservatives won one seat.

== Background ==
Prior to 1974, the area that was to become Ettrick and Lauderdale, was split between four counties – the County of Berwick, the County of Roxburgh, the County of Selkirk and Midlothian. Within that were one of the four burghs of the County of Berwick (Lauder), one of the four burghs of the County of Roxburgh (Melrose) and both of the burghs of the County of Selkirk (Galashiels and Selkirk). These were all small burghs so the burgh council had limited powers which included some control over planning as well as local taxation, building control, housing, lighting and drainage with the rest of the local government responsibility falling to the county council.

Following the recommendations in the Wheatly Report, the old system of counties and burghs – which had resulted in a mishmash of local government areas in which some small burghs had larger populations but far fewer responsibilities than some large burghs and even counties – was to be replaced by a new system of regional and district councils. The Local Government (Scotland) Act 1973 implemented most of the recommendations in the Wheatly Report. The County of Selkirk, including the both burghs was combined with the northern part of the County of Roxburgh which included the burgh of Melrose, the western part of the County of Berwick which included the burgh of Lauder and the southern part of Midlothian and was placed into the Ettrick and Lauderdale district within the Borders region.

== Results ==
1974 Ettrick and Lauderdale District Council election result
Party	Seats	Gains	Losses	Net gain/loss	Seats %	Votes %	Votes	+/−
Independent	14			N/A	87.5	88.9	5,674	N/A
Labour	1			N/A	6.3	6.9	439	N/A
Conservative	1			N/A	6.3	4.2	271	N/A

== Aftermath ==
Ettrick and Lauderdale, like two of the other three districts in the Borders, was non-partisan and controlled by independent candidates who won all but two of the 16 seats. Both Labour and the Scottish Conservative and Unionist Party won one seat. Independents also controlled the regional council which held its first election on the same day. Across Scotland, Labour won the most votes, the most seats and the most councils of any party.
