= 1974 East Kilbride District Council election =

East Kilbride District Council election

- 7 May 1974

All 15 seats to East Kilbride District Council 8 seats needed for a majority
	First party	Second party
Party	SNP	Labour
Seats won	7	5
Popular vote	10,072	11,047
Percentage	36.9%	40.5%
	Third party	Fourth party
Party	Conservative	Independent
Seats won	2	1
Popular vote	4,650	1,147
Percentage	17.0%	4.2%

Elections to East Kilbride District Council were held on 7 May 1974, on the same day as the other Scottish local government elections. This was the first election to the district council following the implementation of the Local Government (Scotland) Act 1973.

The election used the 15 wards created by the Formation Electoral Arrangements in 1974. Each ward elected one councillor using first-past-the-post voting.

The council was left in no overall control following the election. The Scottish National Party (SNP) were the largest party after they won seven of the 15 seats. Labour took five seats and the Conservatives won two seats.

== Background ==
Prior to 1974, the area that was to become East Kilbride included one of the nine burghs of the County of Lanark. In 1947, the town of East Kilbride was the first new town to be designated in Scotland and, after expanding rapidly, the town was made a small burgh in 1963 and a large burgh in 1968. As a small burgh, the burgh council had limited powers which included some control over planning as well as local taxation, building control, housing, lighting and drainage. Further powers over the police, public health, social services, registration of births, marriages and deaths and electoral registration were devolved when the town became a large burgh. The rest of the local government responsibility fell to the county council.

Following the recommendations in the Wheatly Report, the old system of counties and burghs – which had resulted in a mishmash of local government areas in which some small burghs had larger populations but far fewer responsibilities than some large burghs and even counties – was to be replaced by a new system of regional and district councils. The Local Government (Scotland) Act 1973 implemented most of the recommendations in the Wheatly Report. The burgh and the area around it in the west of the County of Lanark was placed into the East Kilbride district within the Strathclyde region.

== Results ==
1974 East Kilbride District Council election result
Party	Seats	Gains	Losses	Net gain/loss	Seats %	Votes %	Votes	+/−
SNP	7			N/A	46.7	36.9	10,072	N/A
Labour	5			N/A	33.3	40.5	11,047	N/A
Conservative	2			N/A	13.3	17.0	4,650	N/A
Independent	1			N/A	6.7	4.2	1,147	N/A
Communist	0			N/A	0.0	1.4	380	N/A

== Aftermath ==
East Kilbride was one of three districts in the newly created Strathclyde region that was left in no overall control. The Scottish National Party (SNP) was the largest party after winning seven of the 15 seats. Labour won five seats and the Conservatives took two seats. One independent candidate was elected. Labour won control of the regional council which held its first election on the same day. Across Scotland, Labour won the most votes, the most seats and the most councils of any party.
