= 1974 Renfrew District Council election =

Renfrew District Council election

7 May 1974	1977 →

All 40 seats to Renfrew District Council 21 seats needed for a majority
	First party	Second party	Third party
Party	Labour	Conservative	Independent
Seats won	25	10	3
Popular vote	33,540	21,894	6,678
Percentage	49.3%	32.2%	9.8%
	Fourth party	Fifth party
Party	SNP	Community association
Seats won	1	1
Popular vote	3,407	1,336
Percentage	5.0%	2.0%

Elections to Renfrew District Council were held on 7 May 1974, on the same day as the other Scottish local government elections. This was the first election to the district council following the implementation of the Local Government (Scotland) Act 1973.

The election used the 40 wards created by the Formation Electoral Arrangements in 1974. Each ward elected one councillor using first-past-the-post voting.

Labour took control of the council after winning a majority. The party took 25 of the 40 seats and almost half of the popular vote. The Conservatives won 10 seats and three independent candidates were elected.

== Background ==
Prior to 1974, the area that was to become Renfrew contained four of the seven burghs of the County of Renfrew. The three small burghs (Barrhead, Johnstone and Renfrew) had limited powers which included some control over planning as well as local taxation, building control, housing, lighting and drainage. The large burgh of Paisley had further powers over the police, public health, social services, registration of births, marriages and deaths and electoral registration. The rest of the local government responsibility fell to the county council which had full control over the areas which were not within a burgh.

Following the recommendations in the Wheatly Report, the old system of counties and burghs – which had resulted in a mishmash of local government areas in which some small burghs had larger populations but far fewer responsibilities than some large burghs and even counties – was to be replaced by a new system of regional and district councils. The Local Government (Scotland) Act 1973 implemented most of the recommendations in the Wheatly Report. The central part of the County of Renfrew which included the four burghs was placed into the Renfrew district within the Strathclyde region.

== Results ==
1974 Renfrew District Council election result
Party	Seats	Gains	Losses	Net gain/loss	Seats %	Votes %	Votes	+/−
Labour	25			N/A	62.5	49.3	33,540	N/A
Conservative	10			N/A	25.0	32.2	21,894	N/A
Independent	3			N/A	7.5	9.8	6,678	N/A
SNP	1			N/A	2.5	5.0	3,407	N/A
Community association	1			N/A	2.5	2.0	1,336	N/A
Tenants Association	0			N/A	0.0	0.9	584	N/A
Liberal	0			N/A	0.0	0.5	334	N/A
Communist	0			N/A	0.0	0.4	277	N/A

== Aftermath ==
Renfrew was one of 11 districts in the newly created Strathclyde region that was won by Labour after the party took 25 of the 40 seats. The Conservatives were the second-largest party after they took 10 seats. and the Liberals both won one seat and one Independent candidate was elected. Labour also won control of the regional council which held its first election on the same day. Across Scotland, Labour won the most votes, the most seats and the most councils of any party.
