= 1974 Kirkcaldy District Council election =

Kirkcaldy District Council election

7 May 1974	1977 →

All 36 seats to Kirkcaldy District Council 19 seats needed for a majority
	First party	Second party
Party	Labour	Conservative
Seats won	24	5
Popular vote	13,961	5,550
Percentage	44.9%	17.9%
	Third party	Fourth party
Party	Residents	Independent
Seats won	4	3
Popular vote	5,404	2,502
Percentage	17.4%	8.0%

Elections to Kirkcaldy District Council were held on 7 May 1974, on the same day as the other Scottish local government elections. This was the first election to the district council following the implementation of the Local Government (Scotland) Act 1973.

The election used the 36 wards created by the Formation Electoral Arrangements in 1974. Each ward elected one councillor using first-past-the-post voting.

Labour took control of the council after winning a majority. The party took 24 of the 36 seats and more than 40% of the popular vote. The Conservatives won five seats and Residents Association candidates won four seats.

== Background ==
Prior to 1974, the area that was to become Kirkcaldy contained seven of the 25 burghs of the County of Fife. The six small burghs (Buckhaven and Methil, Burntisland, Kinghorn, Leslie, Leven and Markinch) had limited powers which included some control over planning as well as local taxation, building control, housing, lighting and drainage. The large burgh of Kirkcaldy had further powers over the police, public health, social services, registration of births, marriages and deaths and electoral registration. The rest of the local government responsibility fell to the county council which had full control over the areas which were not within a burgh.

Following the recommendations in the Wheatly Report, the old system of counties and burghs – which had resulted in a mishmash of local government areas in which some small burghs had larger populations but far fewer responsibilities than some large burghs and even counties – was to be replaced by a new system of regional and district councils. The Local Government (Scotland) Act 1973 implemented most of the recommendations in the Wheatly Report. The central area of the County of Fife which included the seven burghs was placed into the Kirkcaldy district within the Fife region.

== Results ==
1974 Kirkcaldy District Council election result
Party	Seats	Gains	Losses	Net gain/loss	Seats %	Votes %	Votes	+/−
Labour	24			N/A	66.7	44.9	13,961	N/A
Conservative	5			N/A	13.9	17.9	5,550	N/A
Residents	4			N/A	11.1	17.4	5,404	N/A
Independent	3			N/A	8.3	8.0	2,502	N/A
SNP	0			N/A	0.0	7.2	2,239	N/A
Communist	0			N/A	0.0	3.3	1,038	N/A
Independent Labour	0			N/A	0.0	1.3	393	N/A

== Aftermath ==
Kirkcaldy was one of two districts in the newly created Fife region that was won by Labour after the party took 24 of the 36 seats. The Conservatives won five seats while four Residents Association candidates and three independent candidates were elected. Labour also won control of the regional council which held its first election on the same day. Across Scotland, Labour won the most votes, the most seats and the most councils of any party.
