= 1974 Clackmannan District Council election =

Clackmannan District Council election

7 May 1974	1977 →

All 12 seats to Clackmannan District Council 7 seats needed for a majority
	First party	Second party	Third party
Party	SNP	Labour	Independent
Seats won	6	5	1
Popular vote	7,931	6,980	1,994
Percentage	45.4%	39.9%	11.4%

Elections to Clackmannan District Council were held on 7 May 1974, on the same day as the other Scottish local government elections. This was the first election to the district council following the implementation of the Local Government (Scotland) Act 1973.

The election used the 12 wards created by the Formation Electoral Arrangements in 1974. Each ward elected one councillor using first-past-the-post voting.

The council was left in no overall control following the election. The Scottish National Party (SNP) were the largest party after they won six of the 12 seats. Labour took five seats and one independent candidate was elected.

== Background ==
Prior to 1974, the area that was to become Clackmannan, was split between three counties – the County of Clackmannan, the County of Kinross and the County of Perth. Within that were the four burghs of the County of Clackmannan (Alloa, Alva, Dollar and Tillicoultry). These were all small burghs so the burgh council had limited powers which included some control over planning as well as local taxation, building control, housing, lighting and drainage with the rest of the local government responsibility falling to the county council.

Following the recommendations in the Wheatly Report, the old system of counties and burghs – which had resulted in a mishmash of local government areas in which some small burghs had larger populations but far fewer responsibilities than some large burghs and even counties – was to be replaced by a new system of regional and district councils. The Local Government (Scotland) Act 1973 implemented most of the recommendations in the Wheatly Report. The County of Clackmannan which included the four burghs was combined with an area from the southeast of the County of Perth and a small area from the County of Kinross and was placed into the Clackmannan district within the Central region.

== Results ==
1974 Clackmannan District Council election result
Party	Seats	Gains	Losses	Net gain/loss	Seats %	Votes %	Votes	+/−
SNP	6			N/A	50.0	45.4	7,931	N/A
Labour	5			N/A	41.7	39.9	6,980	N/A
Independent	1			N/A	8.3	11.4	1,994	N/A
Liberal	0			N/A	0.0	3.3	578	N/A

== Aftermath ==
Clackmannan, like the other two districts in the newly created Central region, was left in no overall control. The Scottish National Party (SNP) were the largest party after winning six seats and Labour were the second-largest after they took five seats. One independent candidate was elected. Labour won control of the regional council which held its first election on the same day. Across Scotland, Labour won the most votes, the most seats and the most councils of any party.
