= 1974 Caithness District Council election =

Caithness District Council election

7 May 1974	1977 →

All 16 seats to Caithness District Council 9 seats needed for a majority
	First party
Party	Independent
Seats won	16
Popular vote	5,967
Percentage	94.6%
Council Convener after election
John Young
Independent

Elections to Caithness District Council were held on 7 May 1974, on the same day as the other Scottish local government elections. This was the first election to the district council following the implementation of the Local Government (Scotland) Act 1973.

The election used the 16 wards created by the Formation Electoral Arrangements in 1974. Each ward elected one councillor using first-past-the-post voting.

Caithness was a non-partisan district. Only a few political party members contested the election and all 16 seats were won by independents.

== Background ==
Prior to 1974, the area that was to become Caithness, was split between two counties – the County of Caithness and the County of Sutherland. Within that were both of the burghs of the County of Caithness (Wick and Thurso). These were both small burghs so the burgh council had limited powers which included some control over planning as well as local taxation, building control, housing, lighting and drainage with the rest of the local government responsibility falling to the county council.

Following the recommendations in the Wheatly Report, the old system of counties and burghs – which had resulted in a mishmash of local government areas in which some small burghs had larger populations but far fewer responsibilities than some large burghs and even counties – was to be replaced by a new system of regional and district councils. The Local Government (Scotland) Act 1973 implemented most of the recommendations in the Wheatly Report. The County of Caithness which included the two burghs was combined with the northeastern part of the County of Sutherland and was placed into the Caithness district within the Highland region.

== Results ==
1974 Caithness District Council election result
Party	Seats	Gains	Losses	Net gain/loss	Seats %	Votes %	Votes	+/−
Independent	16			N/A	100.0	94.6	5,967	N/A
Labour	0			N/A	0.0	5.4	342	N/A

== Aftermath ==
Caithness, like the other seven districts in Highland, was non-partisan and controlled by independent candidates who won all 16 seats. Independents also controlled the regional council which held its first election on the same day. Across Scotland, Labour won the most votes, the most seats and the most councils of any party.
