= 1974 Midlothian District Council election =

Midlothian District Council election

Elections to Midlothian District Council were held on 7 May 1974, on the same day as the other Scottish local government elections. This was the first election to the district council following the implementation of the Local Government (Scotland) Act 1973.

The election used the 15 wards created by the Formation Electoral Arrangements in 1974. Each ward elected one councillor using first-past-the-post voting.

Labour took control of the council after winning a majority. The party took 11 of the 15 seats and more than half of the popular vote. The Conservatives won two seats, the Scottish National Party (SNP) won one seat and one independent candidate was elected.

== Background ==
Prior to 1974, the area that was to become Midlothian included four of the five burghs within the historic County of Midlothian (Bonnyrigg and Lasswade; Dalkeith; Loanhead; and Penicuik). These were all small burghs so had limited powers which included some control over planning as well as local taxation, building control, housing, lighting and drainage. The rest of the local government responsibility fell to the county council which had full control over the areas which were not within a burgh.

Following the recommendations in the Wheatly Report, the old system of counties and burghs – which had resulted in a mishmash of local government areas in which some small burghs had larger populations but far fewer responsibilities than some large burghs and even counties – was to be replaced by a new system of regional and district councils. The Local Government (Scotland) Act 1973 implemented most of the recommendations in the Wheatly Report. The central part of the historic County of Midlothian which included the four burghs was placed into the Midlothian district within the Lothian region.

== Results ==
1974 Midlothian District Council election
Party	Seats	Gains	Losses	Net gain/loss	Seats %	Votes %	Votes	+/−
Labour	11			N/A	73.3	50.2	11,680	N/A
Conservative	2			N/A	13.3	16.7	3,891	N/A
Independent	1			N/A	6.7	17.9	4,164	N/A
SNP	1			N/A	6.7	14.8	3,449	N/A
Ind. Socialist	0			N/A	0.0	0.5	105	N/A

== Aftermath ==
Midlothian was one of two districts in the newly created Lothian region that was won by Labour. The Conservatives won two seats, the Scottish National Party (SNP) won one seat and one independent candidate was elected. Labour were the largest party on the regional council which held its first election on the same day but no party claimed a majority. Across Scotland, Labour won the most votes, the most seats and the most councils of any party.
