= 1974 Dunfermline District Council election =

Dunfermline District Council election

7 May 1974	1977 →

All 30 seats to Dunfermline District Council 16 seats needed for a majority
	First party	Second party	Third party
Party	Labour	Conservative	SNP
Seats won	19	6	2
Popular vote	18,339	7,262	6,502
Percentage	42.7%	16.9%	15.2%
	Fourth party	Fifth party
Party	Independent	Liberal
Seats won	2	1
Popular vote	3,428	1,173
Percentage	8.0%	2.7%

Elections to Dunfermline District Council were held on 7 May 1974, on the same day as the other Scottish local government elections. This was the first election to the district council following the implementation of the Local Government (Scotland) Act 1973.

The election used the 30 wards created by the Formation Electoral Arrangements in 1974. Each ward elected one councillor using first-past-the-post voting.

Labour took control of the council after winning a majority. The party took 19 of the 30 seats and more than 40% of the popular vote. The Conservatives won six seats and the Scottish National Party (SNP) took two.

== Background ==
Prior to 1974, the area that was to become Dunfermline included five of the 25 burghs of the County of Fife. The four small burghs (Cowdenbeath, Culross, Inverkeithing and Lochgelly) had limited powers which included some control over planning as well as local taxation, building control, housing, lighting and drainage. The large burgh of Dunfermline had further powers over the police, public health, social services, registration of births, marriages and deaths and electoral registration. The rest of the local government responsibility fell to the county council which had full control over the areas which were not within a burgh.

Following the recommendations in the Wheatly Report, the old system of counties and burghs – which had resulted in a mishmash of local government areas in which some small burghs had larger populations but far fewer responsibilities than some large burghs and even counties – was to be replaced by a new system of regional and district councils. The Local Government (Scotland) Act 1973 implemented most of the recommendations in the Wheatly Report. The five burghs as well as the surrounding areas were placed in Dunfermline district within the Fife region.

== Results ==
1974 Dunfermline District Council election result
Party	Seats	Gains	Losses	Net gain/loss	Seats %	Votes %	Votes	+/−
Labour	19			N/A	63.3	42.7	18,339	N/A
Conservative	6			N/A	20.0	16.9	7,262	N/A
SNP	2			N/A	6.7	15.2	6,502	N/A
Independent	2			N/A	6.7	8.0	3,428	N/A
Liberal	1			N/A	3.3	2.7	1,173	N/A
Communist	0			N/A	0.0	9.1	3,890	N/A
Ind. Labour Party	0			N/A	0.0	2.9	1,257	N/A
Residents	0			N/A	0.0	2.4	1,048	N/A

== Aftermath ==
Dunfermline was one of two districts in the newly created Fife region that was won by Labour after the party took 19 of the 30 seats. The Conservatives won six seats while the Scottish National Party (SNP) took two. The Scottish Liberal Party won one seat and one independent candidate was elected. Labour also won control of the regional council which held its first election on the same day. Across Scotland, Labour won the most votes, the most seats and the most councils of any party.
