= 1974 Inverness District Council election =

Inverness District Council election

7 May 1974	1977 →

All 24 seats to Inverness District Council 13 seats needed for a majority
	First party	Second party	Third party
Party	Independent	Labour	Liberal
Seats won	18	2	2
Popular vote	8,308	1,325	594
Percentage	78.6%	11.7%	5.6%
Council Control after election
Independent

Elections to Inverness District Council were held on 7 May 1974, on the same day as the other Scottish local government elections. This was the first election to the district council following the implementation of the Local Government (Scotland) Act 1973.

The election used the 24 wards created by the Formation Electoral Arrangements in 1974. Each ward elected one councillor using first-past-the-post voting.

Inverness was a non-partisan district. Only a few political party members contested the election and 18 seats were won by independents. Both Labour and the Liberals won two seats and two seats were left vacant.

== Background ==
Prior to 1974, the area that was to become Inverness contained one of the three burghs of the County of Inverness. As a large burgh, Inverness had powers over planning, the police, public health, social services, registration of births, marriages and deaths and electoral registration as well as local taxation, building control, housing, lighting and drainage. The rest of the local government responsibility fell to the county council which had full control over the areas which were not within a burgh.

Following the recommendations in the Wheatly Report, the old system of counties and burghs – which had resulted in a mishmash of local government areas in which some small burghs had larger populations but far fewer responsibilities than some large burghs and even counties – was to be replaced by a new system of regional and district councils. The Local Government (Scotland) Act 1973 implemented most of the recommendations in the Wheatly Report. The northeastern part of the County of Inverness which included the burgh was placed into the Inverness district within the Highland region.

== Results ==
1974 Inverness District Council election result
Party	Seats	Gains	Losses	Net gain/loss	Seats %	Votes %	Votes	+/−
Independent	18			N/A		78.6	8,308	N/A
Labour	2			N/A		11.7	1,325	N/A
Liberal	2			N/A		5.6	594	N/A
Communist	0			N/A	0.0	3.2	335	N/A
Vacant	2			N/A				N/A

== Aftermath ==
Inverness, like the other seven districts in Highland, was non-partisan and controlled by independent candidates who won 18 seats. Both Labour and the Liberals won two seats and two seats were left vacant. Independents also controlled the regional council which held its first election on the same day. Across Scotland, Labour won the most votes, the most seats and the most councils of any party.
