= 1974 East Lothian District Council election =

East Lothian District Council election

Elections to East Lothian District Council were held on 7 May 1974, on the same day as the other Scottish local government elections. This was the first election to the district council following the implementation of the Local Government (Scotland) Act 1973.

The election used the 17 wards created by the Formation Electoral Arrangements in 1974. Each ward elected one councillor using first-past-the-post voting.

Labour took control of the council after winning a majority. The party took 10 of the 17 seats and more than a third of the popular vote. The Conservatives won six seats and one independent candidate was elected.

== Background ==
Prior to 1974, the area that was to become East Lothian, was split between two counties – East Lothian (formerly the County of Haddington) and Midlothian (formerly the County of Edinburgh). Within that were all seven burghs of East Lothian (Cockenzie and Port Seton, Dunbar, East Linton, Haddington, North Berwick, Prestonpans and Tranent) and one of the five burghs of Midlothian (Musselburgh). These were all small burghs so the burgh council had limited powers which included some control over planning as well as local taxation, building control, housing, lighting and drainage with the rest of the local government responsibility falling to the county council.

Following the recommendations in the Wheatly Report, the old system of counties and burghs – which had resulted in a mishmash of local government areas in which some small burghs had larger populations but far fewer responsibilities than some large burghs and even counties – was to be replaced by a new system of regional and district councils. The Local Government (Scotland) Act 1973 implemented most of the recommendations in the Wheatly Report. East Lothian was combined with Musselburgh and an area surrounding it from Midlothian and was placed into the East Lothian district within the Lothian region.

== Results ==
1974 East Lothian District Council election result
Party	Seats	Gains	Losses	Net gain/loss	Seats %	Votes %	Votes	+/−
Labour	10			N/A	58.8	35.4	8,212	N/A
Conservative	6			N/A	35.3	38.1	8,825	N/A
Independent	1			N/A	5.9	17.0	3,930	N/A
SNP	0			N/A	0.0	4.1	956	N/A
Independent Labour	0			N/A	0.0	2.3	542	N/A
Residents	0			N/A	0.0	1.8	409	N/A
Liberal	0			N/A	0.0	1.3	299	N/A

== Ward results ==
=== Labour ===
- Musselburgh 1
- Musselburgh 2
- Musselburgh 3
- Musselburgh 4
- Tranent
- Ormiston
- Inveresk
- Prestonpans
- Preston
- Gladsmuir

=== Conservative ===
- Cockenzie
- Lammermuir
- Dirleton
- Dunbar
- East Linton
- North Berwick

=== Independent ===
- Haddington

== Aftermath ==
East Lothian was one of three districts in the newly created Lothian region that was won by Labour after the party took 10 of the 17 seats. The Conservatives won six seats and one independent candidate was elected. The regional council, which held its first election on the same day, was left in no overall control. Across Scotland, Labour won the most votes, the most seats and the most councils of any party.
