= 1974 Clydebank District Council election =

Clydebank District Council election

7 May 1974	1977 →

All 10 seats to Clydebank District Council 6 seats needed for a majority
	First party	Second party	Third party
Party	Labour	SNP	Conservative
Seats won	5	4	1
Popular vote	10,548	7,887	1,327
Percentage	45.0%	33.7%	5.7%

Elections to Clydebank District Council were held on 7 May 1974, on the same day as the other Scottish local government elections. This was the first election to the district council following the implementation of the Local Government (Scotland) Act 1973.

The election used the 10 wards created by the Formation Electoral Arrangements in 1974. Each ward elected one councillor using first-past-the-post voting.

The council was left in no overall control following the election. Labour were the largest party after they won five of the 10 seats. The Scottish National Party (SNP) took four seats while the Conservatives won one seat.

== Background ==
Prior to 1974, the area that was to become Clydebank contained one of the eight burghs of the County of Dunbarton (Clydebank). As a large burgh, Clydebank had powers over planning, the police, public health, social services, registration of births, marriages and deaths and electoral registration as well as the powers of a small burgh which included local taxation, building control, housing, lighting and drainage. The rest of the local government responsibility fell to the county council.

Following the recommendations in the Wheatly Report, the old system of counties and burghs – which had resulted in a mishmash of local government areas in which some small burghs had larger populations but far fewer responsibilities than some large burghs and even counties – was to be replaced by a new system of regional and district councils. The Local Government (Scotland) Act 1973 implemented most of the recommendations in the Wheatly Report. The historic County of Dunbarton was separated into two areas with part of the City of Glasgow and the County of Lanark in between. The burgh of Clydebank as well as an area in the eastern part of the western section of Dunbartonshire was placed into the Clydebank district within the Strathclyde region.

== Results ==
1974 Clydebank District Council election result
Party	Seats	Gains	Losses	Net gain/loss	Seats %	Votes %	Votes	+/−
Labour	5			N/A	50.0	45.0	10,548	N/A
SNP	4			N/A	40.0	33.7	7,887	N/A
Conservative	1			N/A	10.0	5.7	1,327	N/A
Communist	0			N/A	0.0	8.0	1,876	N/A
Independent	0			N/A	0.0	7.6	1,783	N/A

== Aftermath ==
Clydebank was one of three districts in the newly created Strathclyde region that was left in no overall control. Labour was the largest party after winning five of the 10 seats. The Conservatives won four seats and the remaining seat was won by the Scottish National Party (SNP). Labour won control of the regional council which held its first election on the same day. Across Scotland, Labour won the most votes, the most seats and the most councils of any party.
