= 1974 Motherwell District Council election =

Motherwell District Council election

7 May 1974	1977 →

All 30 seats to Motherwell District Council 16 seats needed for a majority
	First party	Second party
Party	Labour	Conservative
Seats won	27	1
Popular vote	23,369	7,185
Percentage	56.7%	17.4%
	Third party	Fourth party
Party	Liberal	Independent
Seats won	1	1
Popular vote	2,319	2,274
Percentage	5.6%	5.5%

Elections to Motherwell District Council were held on 7 May 1974, on the same day as the other Scottish local government elections. This was the first election to the district council following the implementation of the Local Government (Scotland) Act 1973.

The election used the 30 wards created by the Formation Electoral Arrangements in 1974. Each ward elected one councillor using first-past-the-post voting.

Labour took control of the council after winning a majority. The party took 27 of the 30 seats and more than half of the popular vote. The Conservatives and the Liberals both won one seat and one independent candidate was elected.

== Background ==
Prior to 1974, the area that was to become Motherwell contained one of the nine burghs of the County of Lanark (Motherwell and Wishaw). This was a large burgh so had powers which included control over planning as well as local taxation, building control, housing, lighting, drainage, police, public health, social services, registration of births, marriages and deaths and electoral registration. The rest of the local government responsibility fell to the county council which had full control over the areas which were not within a burgh.

Following the recommendations in the Wheatly Report, the old system of counties and burghs – which had resulted in a mishmash of local government areas in which some small burghs had larger populations but far fewer responsibilities than some large burghs and even counties – was to be replaced by a new system of regional and district councils. The Local Government (Scotland) Act 1973 implemented most of the recommendations in the Wheatly Report. An area in central Lanarkshire surrounding the burgh was placed into the Motherwell district within the Strathclyde region.

== Results ==
1974 Motherwell District Council election result
Party	Seats	Gains	Losses	Net gain/loss	Seats %	Votes %	Votes	+/−
Labour	27			N/A	90.0	56.7	23,369	N/A
Conservative	1			N/A	3.3	17.4	7,185	N/A
Liberal	1			N/A	3.3	5.6	2,319	N/A
Independent	1			N/A	3.3	5.5	2,274	N/A
SNP	0			N/A	0.0	9.1	3,771	N/A
Communist	0			N/A	0.0	3.9	1,600	N/A
Independent Labour	0			N/A	0.0	1.8	725	N/A

== Aftermath ==
Motherwell was one of 11 districts in the newly created Strathclyde region that was won by Labour. The Conservatives and the Liberals both won one seat and one independent candidate was elected. Labour also won control of the regional council which held its first election on the same day. Across Scotland, Labour won the most votes, the most seats and the most councils of any party.
