= 1974 Moray District Council election =

Moray District Council election

- 7 May 1974

All 18 seats to Moray District Council 10 seats needed for a majority
	First party	Second party
Party	Independent	SNP
Seats won	17	1
Popular vote	14,292	1,360
Percentage	86.7%	8.3%

Elections to Moray District Council were held on 7 May 1974, on the same day as the other Scottish local government elections. This was the first election to the district council following the implementation of the Local Government (Scotland) Act 1973.

The election used the 18 wards created by the Formation Electoral Arrangements in 1974. Each ward elected one councillor using first-past-the-post voting.

Moray was a non-partisan district. Only a few political party members contested the election and all but one of the 17 seats were won by independents. The remaining seat was won by the Scottish National Party (SNP).

== Background ==
Prior to 1974, the area that was to become Moray, was split between two counties – the County of Banff and the County of Moray. Within that were seven of the 11 burghs of the County of Banff (Aberlour, Buckie, Cullen, Dufftown, Findochty, Keith and Portknockie) and five of the six burghs of the County of Moray (Burghead, Elgin, Forres, Lossiemouth and Branderburgh and Rothes). These were all small burghs so the burgh council had limited powers which included some control over planning as well as local taxation, building control, housing, lighting and drainage with the rest of the local government responsibility falling to the county council. Although the County of Moray and the County of Nairn remained as separate entities, they had been combined for most but not all purposes as a result of the Local Government (Scotland) Act 1929 and the Local Government (Scotland) Act 1947.

Following the recommendations in the Wheatly Report, the old system of counties and burghs – which had resulted in a mishmash of local government areas in which some small burghs had larger populations but far fewer responsibilities than some large burghs and even counties – was to be replaced by a new system of regional and district councils. The Local Government (Scotland) Act 1973 implemented most of the recommendations in the Wheatly Report. The western and southern parts of the County of Banff which included the seven burghs was combined with the northern part of the County of Moray which contained the five burghs and was placed into the Moray district within the Highland region.

== Results ==
1974 Moray District Council election result
Party	Seats	Gains	Losses	Net gain/loss	Seats %	Votes %	Votes	+/−
Independent	17			N/A	94.4	86.7	14,292	N/A
SNP	1			N/A	5.6	8.3	1,360	N/A
Labour	0			N/A	0.0	5.0	832	N/A

== Ward results ==
=== Bishopmill ===
Party	Candidate	Votes	%
SNP	A Anderson	703	61.3
Labour	W MacKenzie	443	38.7
Majority		260	22.6
Turnout		1,146	36.3
SNP win (new seat)			

=== Cathedral ===
Party	Candidate	Votes	%
Independent	J Russell	612	53.5
SNP	E Hendry	531	46.5
Majority		81	7.0
Turnout		1,143	36.8
Independent win (new seat)			

=== New Elgin ===
Party	Candidate	Votes	%
Independent	R Hossack	385	50.4
Independent	W Adam	199	26.0
SNP	A Stuart	126	16.5
Labour	R McLeod	54	7.1
Majority		186	24.4
Turnout		764	40.3
Independent win (new seat)			

=== Central West ===
Party	Candidate	Votes	%
Independent	T McMillan	Unopposed	
Independent win (new seat)			

=== Forres ===
Party	Candidate	Votes	%
Independent	A Forbes	Unopposed	
Independent win (new seat)			

=== Findhorn Valley ===
Party	Candidate	Votes	%
Independent	J Carr	689	55.4
Independent	J Bichan	554	44.6
Majority		135	10.8
Turnout		1,243	39.4
Independent win (new seat)			

=== Laich ===
Party	Candidate	Votes	%
Independent	D Thompson	536	49.3
Independent	R Keith	287	26.4
Independent	N McGillivray	264	24.3
Majority		249	22.9
Turnout		1,087	39.9
Independent win (new seat)			

=== Lossiemouth ===
Party	Candidate	Votes	%
Independent	J Taylor	1,535	71.4
Independent	D Herd	614	28.6
Majority		921	42.8
Turnout		2,149	55.6
Independent win (new seat)			

=== Heldon ===
Party	Candidate	Votes	%
Independent	J Anderson	Unopposed	
Independent win (new seat)			

=== Innes ===
Party	Candidate	Votes	%
Independent	G Baxter	Unopposed	
Independent win (new seat)			

=== Buckie West ===
Party	Candidate	Votes	%
Independent	E Brown	818	69.4
Independent	P Jappy	360	30.6
Majority		458	38.8
Turnout		1,178	38.8
Independent win (new seat)			

=== Buckie East ===
Party	Candidate	Votes	%
Independent	E Douglas	612	49.4
Labour	J Reid	335	27.0
Independent	A Gowrie	292	23.6
Majority		277	22.4
Turnout		1,239	43.3
Independent win (new seat)			

=== Rathford ===
Party	Candidate	Votes	%
Independent	W Mair	650	51.3
Independent	P Flett	371	29.3
Independent	J Mair	247	19.5
Majority		279	32.0
Turnout		1,268	33.8
Independent win (new seat)			

=== Lennox ===
Party	Candidate	Votes	%
Independent	A Shirran	589	63.5
Independent	G Cowie	338	36.5
Majority		251	27.0
Turnout		927	39.8
Independent win (new seat)			

=== Keith ===
Party	Candidate	Votes	%
Independent	L Mann	936	56.6
Independent	E Ettles	718	43.4
Majority		218	13.2
Turnout		1,654	54.1
Independent win (new seat)			

=== Strathisla ===
Party	Candidate	Votes	%
Independent	G Hendry	644	66.7
Independent	W Stephen	321	33.3
Majority		323	33.4
Turnout		965	43.6
Independent win (new seat)			

=== Speyside ===
Party	Candidate	Votes	%
Independent	E Aldridge	758	44.0
Independent	D Mackay	456	26.5
Independent	D MacPherson	262	15.2
Independent	J Garden	212	12.3
Independent	J Allan	33	1.9
Majority		302	17.5
Turnout		1,721	56.3
Independent win (new seat)			

=== Glenlivet ===
Party	Candidate	Votes	%
Independent	W McKenzie	Unopposed	
Independent win (new seat)			

== Aftermath ==
Moray, like the other three of the other four districts in Grampian, was non-partisan and controlled by independent candidates who won all but one of the 18 seats. The remaining seat was won by the Scottish National Party (SNP). The Conservatives won control of the regional council which held its first election on the same day. Across Scotland, Labour won the most votes, the most seats and the most councils of any party.
