= 1974 Gordon District Council election =

Gordon District Council election

7 May 1974	1977 →

All 12 seats to Gordon District Council 7 seats needed for a majority
	First party	Second party	Third party
Party	Independent	Conservative	Liberal
Seats won	6	4	2
Popular vote	4,559	4,408	2,918
Percentage	38.0%	36.8%	24.3%

Elections to Gordon District Council were held on 7 May 1974, on the same day as the other Scottish local government elections. This was the first election to the district council following the implementation of the Local Government (Scotland) Act 1973.

The election used the 12 wards created by the Formation Electoral Arrangements in 1974. Each ward elected one councillor using first-past-the-post voting.

The council was left in no overall control following the election. Independent candidates won six of the 12 seats. The Conservatives were the largest party after they took four seats while the Liberals won two seats.

== Background ==
Prior to 1974, the area that was to become Gordon, contained were five of the 10 burghs of the County of Aberdeen (Ellon, Huntly, Inverurie, Kintore and Oldmeldrum). These were all small burghs so the burgh council had limited powers which included some control over planning as well as local taxation, building control, housing, lighting and drainage with the rest of the local government responsibility falling to the county council.

Following the recommendations in the Wheatly Report, the old system of counties and burghs – which had resulted in a mishmash of local government areas in which some small burghs had larger populations but far fewer responsibilities than some large burghs and even counties – was to be replaced by a new system of regional and district councils. The Local Government (Scotland) Act 1973 implemented most of the recommendations in the Wheatly Report. The central part of the County of Aberdeen which included the five burghs was placed into the Gordon district within the Grampian region.

== Results ==
1974 Gordon District Council election result
Party	Seats	Gains	Losses	Net gain/loss	Seats %	Votes %	Votes	+/−
Independent	6			N/A	50.0	38.0	4,559	N/A
Conservative	4			N/A	33.3	36.8	4,408	N/A
Liberal	2			N/A	16.7	24.3	2,918	N/A
Labour	0			N/A	0.0	0.8	99	N/A

== Aftermath ==
Gordon was left in no overall control following the election but, like the three of the other districts in Grampian except the City of Aberdeen, saw more independent candidates elected than political parties. Independents took six seats, the Conservatives won four seats and the Liberals won the remaining two seats. The Conservatives controlled the regional council which held its first election on the same day. Across Scotland, Labour won the most votes, the most seats and the most councils of any party.
