= 1974 Monklands District Council election =

Monklands District Council election

7 May 1974	1977 →

All 20 seats to Monklands District Council 11 seats needed for a majority
	First party	Second party	Third party
Party	Labour	Conservative	Independent
Seats won	15	4	1
Popular vote	20,456	13,918	1,471
Percentage	53.8%	36.6%	3.9%

Elections to Monklands District Council were held on 7 May 1974, on the same day as the other Scottish local government elections. This was the first election to the district council following the implementation of the Local Government (Scotland) Act 1973.

The election used the 20 wards created by the Formation Electoral Arrangements in 1974. Each ward elected one councillor using first-past-the-post voting.

Labour took control of the council after winning a majority. The party took 15 of the 20 seats and more than half of the popular vote. The Conservatives won four seats and one independent candidate was elected.

== Background ==
Prior to 1974, the area that was to become Monklands contained two of the nine burghs of the County of Lanark (Airdrie and Coatbridge). These were both large burghs so had powers which included control over planning as well as local taxation, building control, housing, lighting, drainage, police, public health, social services, registration of births, marriages and deaths and electoral registration. The rest of the local government responsibility fell to the county council which had full control over the areas which were not within a burgh.

Following the recommendations in the Wheatly Report, the old system of counties and burghs – which had resulted in a mishmash of local government areas in which some small burghs had larger populations but far fewer responsibilities than some large burghs and even counties – was to be replaced by a new system of regional and district councils. The Local Government (Scotland) Act 1973 implemented most of the recommendations in the Wheatly Report. The northeastern part of the County of Lanark which included the two burghs was placed into the Monklands district within the Strathclyde region.

== Results ==
1974 Monklands District Council election result
Party	Seats	Gains	Losses	Net gain/loss	Seats %	Votes %	Votes	+/−
Labour	15			N/A	75.0	53.8	20,456	N/A
Conservative	4			N/A	20.0	36.6	13,918	N/A
Independent	1			N/A	5.0	3.9	1,471	N/A
Progressives	0			N/A	0.0	3.0	1,142	N/A
SNP	0			N/A	0.0	2.5	954	N/A
Communist	0			N/A	0.0	0.2	77	N/A

== Aftermath ==
Monklands was one of 11 districts in the newly created Strathclyde region that was won by Labour. The Conservatives were the second-largest party after taking four seats and one Independent candidate was elected. Labour also won control of the regional council which held its first election on the same day. Across Scotland, Labour won the most votes, the most seats and the most councils of any party.
