= 1974 Lanark District Council election =

Lanark District Council election

- 7 May 1974

All 14 seats to Lanark District Council 8 seats needed for a majority
	First party	Second party
Party	Independent	Labour
Seats won	6	4
Popular vote	6,202	7,827
Percentage	34.1%	43.0%
	Third party	Fourth party
Party	SNP	Progressives
Seats won	2	2
Popular vote	2,085	2,074
Percentage	11.5%	11.4%

Elections to Lanark District Council were held on 7 May 1974, on the same day as the other Scottish local government elections. This was the first election to the district council following the implementation of the Local Government (Scotland) Act 1973.

The election used the 14 wards created by the Formation Electoral Arrangements in 1974. Each ward elected one councillor using first-past-the-post voting.

The council was left in no overall control following the election. independent candidates won the most seats after taking six of the 14 seats. Labour were the largest party after they won four seats while the Scottish National Party (SNP) won two seats and two progressive candidates were elected.

== Background ==
Prior to 1974, the area that was to become Lanark contained two of the nine burghs of the County of Lanark (Biggar and Lanark). These were both small burghs so the burgh council had limited powers which included some control over planning as well as local taxation, building control, housing, lighting and drainage with the rest of the local government responsibility falling to the county council.

Following the recommendations in the Wheatly Report, the old system of counties and burghs – which had resulted in a mishmash of local government areas in which some small burghs had larger populations but far fewer responsibilities than some large burghs and even counties – was to be replaced by a new system of regional and district councils. The Local Government (Scotland) Act 1973 implemented most of the recommendations in the Wheatly Report. The southern part of the County of Lanark which included the two burghs was placed into the Lanark district within the Strathclyde region.

== Results ==
1974 Lanark District Council election result
Party	Seats	Gains	Losses	Net gain/loss	Seats %	Votes %	Votes	+/−
Independent	6			N/A	42.9	34.1	6,202	N/A
Labour	4			N/A	28.6	43.0	7,827	N/A
SNP	2			N/A	14.3	11.5	2,085	N/A
Progressives	2			N/A	14.3	11.4	2,074	N/A

== Aftermath ==
Lanark was left in no overall control following the election but, unlike most of the other districts in Strathclyde except the Argyll, saw more independent candidates elected than political parties. Independents took six seats, Labour won four seats, the Scottish National Party (SNP) won two seats and two Progressives were elected. Labour controlled the regional council which held its first election on the same day. Across Scotland, Labour won the most votes, the most seats and the most councils of any party.
