= 1974 Banff and Buchan District Council election =

Banff and Buchan District Council election

- 7 May 1974

All 18 seats to Banff and Buchan District Council 10 seats needed for a majority
	First party	Second party	Third party
	Ind	Con	Lab
Party	Independent	Conservative	Labour
Seats won	15	2	1
Popular vote	14,306	2,518	2,704
Percentage	71.4%	12.6%	13.5%
Council Leader after election
Independent

Elections to Banff and Buchan District Council were held on 7 May 1974, on the same day as the other Scottish local government elections. This was the first election to the district council following the implementation of the Local Government (Scotland) Act 1973.

The election used the 10 wards created by the Formation Electoral Arrangements in 1974. Each ward elected one councillor using first-past-the-post voting.

Banff and Buchan was a non-partisan district. Only a few members of political parties contested the election and all but three of the 18 seats were won by independents.

== Background ==
Prior to 1974, the area that was to become Banff and Buchan, was split between two counties – the County of Banff and the County of Aberdeen. Within that were five of the 11 burghs of the County of Banff (Aberchirder, Banff, Fraserburgh, Macduff and Portsoy) and two of the 10 burghs of the County of Aberdeen (Peterhead, Rosehearty and Turriff). These were all small burghs so the burgh council had limited powers which included some control over planning as well as local taxation, building control, housing, lighting and drainage with the rest of the local government responsibility falling to the county council.

Following the recommendations in the Wheatly Report, the old system of counties and burghs – which had resulted in a mishmash of local government areas in which some small burghs had larger populations but far fewer responsibilities than some large burghs and even counties – was to be replaced by a new system of regional and district councils. The Local Government (Scotland) Act 1973 implemented most of the recommendations in the Wheatly Report. The northeastern part of the County of Banff which included the five burghs was combined with the northern part of the County of Aberdeen and was placed into the Banff and Buchan district within the Grampian region.

== Results ==
1974 Banff and Buchan District Council election result
Party	Seats	Gains	Losses	Net gain/loss	Seats %	Votes %	Votes	+/−
Independent	15			N/A	94.4	71.4	14,306	N/A
Conservative	2			N/A	11.1	12.6	2,518	N/A
Labour	1			N/A	5.6	13.5	2,704	N/A
Progressives	0			N/A	0.0	2.6	522	N/A

== Ward results ==
=== Macduff ===
Macduff
Party	Candidate	Votes	%
Independent	J. Wood	443	46.3
Independent	S. Mair	275	28.7
Independent	A. Smith	239	25.0
Majority		168	17.6
Turnout		957	36.2
Independent win (new seat)			

=== King Edward-Gamrie ===
King Edward-Gamrie
Party	Candidate	Votes	%
Independent	R. Thompson	416	63.5
Conservative	W. Sharp	239	36.5
Majority		177	27.0
Turnout		655	31.6
Independent win (new seat)			

=== Banff-Hilton ===
Banff-Hilton
Party	Candidate	Votes	%
Independent	A. Gordon	458	34.0
Independent	J. Smith	349	25.9
Labour	J. Reid	347	25.7
Independent	M. Duncan	153	11.3
Independent	R. Kelbie	42	3.1
Majority		109	8.1
Turnout		1,349	44.8
Independent win (new seat)			

=== Fordyce/Boyndie ===
Fordyce/Boyndie
Party	Candidate	Votes	%
Independent	J. Hay	482	41.2
Independent	W. Stephen	327	28.0
Independent	A. Milne	220	18.8
Independent	C. McKay	140	12.0
Majority		155	13.2
Turnout		1,169	38.7
Independent win (new seat)			

=== Aberchirder ===
Aberchirder
Party	Candidate	Votes	%
Independent	J. Shand	598	43.7
Progressive Party (Scotland)	E. Mutch	522	38.2
Conservative	N. Wilson	248	18.1
Majority		76	5.5
Turnout		1,368	51.5
Independent win (new seat)			

=== Turriff ===
Turriff
Party	Candidate	Votes	%
Independent	Rev. P. MacQuoid	912	58.8
Labour	J. Dawson	638	41.2
Majority		274	17.6
Turnout		1,550	50.6
Independent win (new seat)			

=== Deer ===
Deer
Party	Candidate	Votes	%
Independent	W .Cruickshank	870	62.5
Independent	H. Bain	521	37.5
Majority		349	25.0
Turnout		1,391	42.3
Independent win (new seat)			

=== Fyvie/Monquhitter ===
Fyvie/Monquhitter
Party	Candidate	Votes	%
Independent	J. Gordon	500	51.3
Independent	J. Shiach	474	48.7
Majority		26	2.6
Turnout		974	41.5
Independent win (new seat)			

=== Meethill/Boddam ===
Meethill/Boddam
Party	Candidate	Votes	%
Independent	W. Cormack	458	64.5
Labour	F. Duthie	252	35.5
Majority		206	29.0
Turnout		710	24.2
Independent win (new seat)			

=== Clerkhill ===
Clerkhill
Party	Candidate	Votes	%
Independent	W. MacDonald	702	78.8
Labour	S. Sissons	189	21.2
Majority		513	57.6
Turnout		891	31.5
Independent win (new seat)			

=== Kirktown/Roanheads ===
Kirktown/Roanheads
Party	Candidate	Votes	%
Labour	G. Baird	Unopposed	
Labour win (new seat)			

=== Buchanhaven/Catto ===
Buchanhaven/Catto
Party	Candidate	Votes	%
Independent	J. Alexander	504	59.2
Labour	E. Sudding	347	40.8
Majority		157	18.4
Turnout		851	26.7
Independent win (new seat)			

=== Fraserburgh Saltoun ===
Fraserburgh Saltoun
Party	Candidate	Votes	%
Independent	D. Swanson	512	46.6
Independent	H. Tocher	349	31.8
Labour	G. Young	238	21.7
Majority		163	14.8
Turnout		1,099	37.4
Independent win (new seat)			

=== Fraserburgh South/Rathen ===
Fraserburgh South/Rathen
Party	Candidate	Votes	%
Independent	J. Fraser	738	47.1
Independent	A. May	642	41.0
Labour	G. McFarlane	187	11.9
Majority		96	6.1
Turnout		1,567	45.5
Independent win (new seat)			

=== Fraserburgh/Broadsea ===
Fraserburgh/Broadsea
Party	Candidate	Votes	%
Independent	A. Noble	718	67.4
Labour	G. Lillie	347	32.6
Majority		371	34.8
Turnout		1,065	33.5
Independent win (new seat)			

=== North Buchanorth ===
North Buchanorth
Party	Candidate	Votes	%
Independent	D. Murison	529	36.2
Independent	W. Simpson	423	28.9
Independent	R. Dawson	351	24.0
Labour	J. Davie	159	10.9
Majority		106	7.3
Turnout		1,462	43.5
Independent win (new seat)			

=== Longside/Cruden ===
Longside/Cruden
Party	Candidate	Votes	%
Conservative	L. Cantlay	742	56.8
Independent	J. Michie	465	35.6
Independent	G. Horne	100	7.7
Majority		277	21.2
Turnout		1,307	47.9
Conservative win (new seat)			

=== Rattray/Strichen ===
Rattray/Strichen
Party	Candidate	Votes	%
Conservative	N. Cowie	1,289	76.5
Independent	S. Leith	396	23.5
Majority		893	53.0
Turnout		1,685	57.8
Conservative win (new seat)			

== Aftermath ==
Banff and Buchan, like the other three districts in Grampian excluding the City of Aberdeen, was non-partisan and controlled by Independent candidates who won all 15 of the 18 seats. The Conservatives controlled the regional council which held its first election on the same day. Across Scotland, Labour won the most votes, the most seats and the most councils of any party.
