= 1978 Borders Regional Council election =

1978 Scottish local government election

← 1974	2 May 1978	1982 →

All 23 seats to Borders Regional Council 12 seats needed for a majority
	First party	Second party	Third party
Party	Independent	Conservative	Liberal
Last election	13 seats, 52.2%	7 seats, 20.4%	3 seats, 24.5%
Seats won	11	9	1
Seat change	▼2	▲2	▼2
Popular vote	9,572	2,953	2,646
Percentage	52.7%	16.2%	14.6%
Swing	▲0.5%	▼4.2%	▼9.9%
	Fourth party	Fifth party
Party	Independent Nationalist	SNP
Last election	Did not contest	0 seats, 1.9%
Seats won	1	1
Seat change	▲1	▲1
Popular vote	758	524
Percentage	4.2%	2.9%
Swing	New	▲1.0%

The 1978 election to Borders Regional Council took place on 2 May 1978 as part of the wider 1978 Scottish regional elections. There were 23 wards, each electing a single member using the first-past-the-post voting system.

== Results ==
1978 Borders Regional Council election result
Party	Seats	Gains	Losses	Net gain/loss	Seats %	Votes %	Votes	+/−
Independent	11			▼2	47.8	52.7	9,572	▲0.5
Conservative	9			▲2	39.1	16.2	2,953	▼4.2
Liberal	1			▼2	4.3	14.6	2,646	▼9.9
Independent Nationalist	1			▲1	4.3	4.2	758	New
SNP	1			▲1	4.3	2.9	524	▲1.0
Labour	0	0	0	Steady	0.0	9.5	1,722	▲8.4
