= 1974 Borders Regional Council election =

1974 Scottish local government election

7 May 1974	1978 →

All 23 seats to Borders Regional Council 12 seats needed for a majority
	First party	Second party	Third party
Party	Independent	Conservative	Liberal
Seats won	13	7	3
Popular vote	17,134	6,682	8,043
Percentage	52.2%	20.4%	24.5%

Elections to the newly created Borders Regional Council took place on 7 May 1974, as part of the wider 1974 Scottish local elections. There were 23 wards, each electing a single member using the first-past-the-post voting system.

== Results ==
1974 Borders Regional Council election result
Party	Seats	Gains	Losses	Net gain/loss	Seats %	Votes %	Votes	+/−
Independent	13	-	-	-	56.5	52.2	17,134	New
Conservative	7	-	-	-	30.4	20.4	6,682	New
Liberal	3	-	-	-	13.0	24.5	8,043	New
SNP	0	-	-	-	0.0	1.9	616	New
Labour	0	-	-	-	0.0	1.1	347	New
