= 1974 Central Regional Council election =

1974 Scottish local government election

7 May 1974	1978 →

All 34 seats to Central Regional Council 18 seats needed for a majority
	First party	Second party	Third party
Party	Labour	SNP	Conservative
Seats won	17	9	4
Popular vote	41,086	32,948	9,225
Percentage	43.4%	34.8%	9.7%
	Fourth party	Fifth party
Party	Independent	Independent Labour
Seats won	3	1
Popular vote	9,938	1,423
Percentage	10.5%	1.5%

Elections to the newly created Central Regional Council took place on 7 May 1974, as part of the wider 1974 Scottish local elections. There were 34 wards, each electing a single member using the first-past-the-post voting system.

== Results ==
1974 Central Regional Council election result
Party	Seats	Gains	Losses	Net gain/loss	Seats %	Votes %	Votes	+/−
Labour	17	-	-		50.0	43.4	41,086	New
SNP	9	-	-		26.5	34.8	32,948	New
Conservative	4	-	-		11.8	9.7	9,225	New
Independent	3	-	-		8.8	10.5	9,938	New
Independent Labour	1	-	-		2.9	1.5	1,423	New
Scottish Workers Republican Party	0	-	-	-	0.0	0.1	51	New
