= 1974 Tayside Regional Council election =

1974 Scottish local government election

7 May 1974	1978 →

All 46 seats to Tayside Regional Council 24 seats needed for a majority
	First party	Second party	Third party
Party	Conservative	Labour	Independent
Seats won	22	15	9
Popular vote	55,425	41,138	25,166
Percentage	43.8%	32.5%	19.9%

Elections to the newly created Tayside Regional Council took place on 7 May 1974, as part of the wider 1974 Scottish local elections. There were 46 wards, each electing a single member using the first-past-the-post voting system.

== Results ==
1974 Tayside Regional Council election result
Party	Seats	Gains	Losses	Net gain/loss	Seats %	Votes %	Votes	+/−
Conservative	22	-	-		47.8	43.8	55,425	New
Labour	15	-	-		32.6	32.5	41,138	New
Independent	9	-	-		19.6	19.9	25,166	New
Liberal	0	-	-		0.0	1.7	2,092	New
Progressives	0	-	-		0.0	1.0	1,319	New
Communist	0	-	-	-	0.0	0.6	768	New
Independent Labour	0	-	-	-	0.0	0.4	495	New
