= 1974 Lothian Regional Council election =

1974 Scottish local government election

- 7 May 1974

All 49 seats to Lothian Regional Council 25 seats needed for a majority
	First party	Second party	Third party
Party	Labour	Conservative	SNP
Seats won	24	19	3
Popular vote	103,622	89,194	30,149
Percentage	39.9%	34.3%	11.6%
	Fourth party	Fifth party	Sixth party
Party	Liberal	Independent	Residents
Seats won	1	1	1
Popular vote	23,495	9,065	2,940
Percentage	9.0%	3.5%	1.1%

The 1974 Lothian Regional Council election was held on 7 May 1974 and saw Labour emerging as the largest party on the council, although falling just shy of a majority.

== Results ==
1974 Lothian Regional Council election
Party	Seats	Gains	Losses	Net gain/loss	Seats %	Votes %	Votes	+/−
Labour	24				49.0	39.9	103,622	
Conservative	19				38.8	34.3	89,194	
SNP	3				6.1	11.6	30,149	
Liberal	1				2.0	9.0	23,495	
Independent	1				2.0	3.5	9,065	
Residents Association	1				2.0	1.1	2,940	
Independent Labour	0				0.0	0.3	900	
Communist	0				0.0	0.2	473	

== Ward results ==
=== Armadale ===
Armadale
Party	Candidate	Votes	%
SNP	J. Hamilton	2,441	40.3
Labour	C. Morgan	2,322	38.3
Independent Labour	W. Ferrier	900	14.9
Independent	M. King	393	6.5
Majority		119	2.0
SNP hold			

=== Bathgate ===
Bathgate
Party	Candidate	Votes	%
Residents	W. Stewart	2,349	43.1
Labour	J. Burns	1,683	30.9
SNP	S. MacQuarrie	1,324	24.3
Communist	C. Bett	94	1.7
Majority		666	12.2
Residents hold			

=== Whitburn ===
Whitburn
Party	Candidate	Votes	%
Labour	A. Bell	3,409	54.6
SNP	W. McBride	2,180	34.9
Independent	W. M. Kenny	560	9.0
Communist	J. King	94	1.5
Majority		1,229	19.7
Labour hold			

=== Calders ===
Calders
Party	Candidate	Votes	%
Labour	W. G. Rankine	3,153	48.3
SNP	W. L. Stevenson	2,594	39.8
Liberal	W. M. Kenny	776	11.9
Majority		559	8.5
Labour hold			

=== Linlithgow/Uphall ===
Linlithgow/Uphall
Party	Candidate	Votes	%
SNP	J. McGinley	3,761	62.4
Labour	J. Christie	2,264	37.6
Majority		1,497	24.8
SNP hold			

=== Broxburn ===
Broxburn
Party	Candidate	Votes	%
Labour	M. Coyne	2,311	36.6
SNP	R. Taylor	2,153	34.1
Independent	Jane Paris	1,852	29.3
Majority		158	2.5
Labour hold			

=== Livingston ===
Livingston
Party	Candidate	Votes	%
Labour	W. Hanlon	3,000	50.5
SNP	B. B. Pitt	2,945	49.5
Majority		55	1.0
Labour hold			

=== Holyrood/Meadows ===
Holyrood/Meadows
Party	Candidate	Votes	%
Labour	G. Foulkes	2,400	53.6
Conservative	L. Taylor	1,489	33.2
Residents	H. C. Gray	591	13.2
Majority		911	20.4
Labour hold			

=== Lochrin/Tron ===
Lochrin/Tron
Party	Candidate	Votes	%
Labour	W. J. Taylor	1,824	45.5
Conservative	D. F. E. Hall	1,632	40.7
Liberal	I. C. Simpson	551	13.8
Majority		192	4.8
Labour hold			

=== Dalry/Tynecastle ===
Dalry/Tynecastle
Party	Candidate	Votes	%
Labour	J. G. W. Buchanan	1,745	41.7
Conservative	Fiona M. Cameron	970	23.2
SNP	R. K. Strathan	945	22.6
Liberal	Jenny M. M. Blain	525	12.5
Majority		775	18.5
Labour hold			

=== Moat/Polwarth ===
Moat/Polwarth
Party	Candidate	Votes	%
Labour	Catherine B. M. Filsell	2,127	40.4
Liberal	J. F. Lawrie	1,943	36.9
Conservative	K. N. McLeod	1,196	22.7
Majority		184	3.5
Labour hold			

=== Church Hill/Braid ===
Church Hill/Braid
Party	Candidate	Votes	%
Conservative	A. H. Lester	3,381	52.2
Liberal	N. L. Gordon	2,651	40.9
Labour	Isabella M. Williamson	444	6.9
Majority		730	11.3
Conservative hold			

=== Sciennes/Marchmont ===
Sciennes/Marchmont
Party	Candidate	Votes	%
Conservative	G. W. Reid	3,359	57.0
Liberal	J. Gilmour	1,721	29.2
Labour	I. M. Christie	811	13.8
Majority		1,638	27.8
Conservative hold			

=== Prestonfield/Mayfield ===
Prestonfield/Mayfield
Party	Candidate	Votes	%
Conservative	D. Alves	3,141	51.1
Labour	Jessie Rogan	1,864	30.3
Liberal	R. P. Wassell	1,143	18.6
Majority		1,277	20.8
Conservative hold			

=== Inch/Gilmerton ===
Inch/Gilmerton
Party	Candidate	Votes	%
Labour	P. Wilson	4,345	76.4
Conservative	Muriel Lester	1,346	23.6
Majority		2,999	52.8
Labour hold			

=== Alnwickhill/Kaimes ===
Alnwickhill/Kaimes
Party	Candidate	Votes	%
Labour	T. J. Davies	2,717	55.4
Conservative	Rosemary Macarthur	2,190	44.6
Majority		527	10.8
Labour hold			

=== Merchiston/Colinton ===
Merchiston/Colinton
Party	Candidate	Votes	%
Conservative	J. D. Maclennan	3,936	53.5
Liberal	S. P. Ross-Smith	2,189	29.8
SNP	R. E. Young	637	8.7
Labour	J. A. Mitchell	593	8.1
Majority		1,747	23.7
Conservative hold			

=== Fairmilehead/Firrhill ===
Fairmilehead/Firrhill
Party	Candidate	Votes	%
Conservative	B. A. Meek	3,003	43.7
Labour	M. C. B. McGregor	1,794	26.1
SNP	J. McKernan	1,282	18.7
Liberal	J. S. O. Moffat	793	11.5
Majority		1,209	17.6
Conservative hold			

=== Sighthill/Stenhouse ===
Sighthill/Stenhouse
Party	Candidate	Votes	%
Labour	W. Wallace	4,594	68.3
Conservative	W. G. Samuel	2,030	30.2
Communist	M. Currie	107	1.6
Majority		2,564	38.1
Labour hold			

=== Slateford/Hailes ===
Slateford/Hailes
Party	Candidate	Votes	%
Labour	C. D. Bisset	2,498	42.4
Conservative	Elizabeth Alves	1,739	29.5
SNP	I. H. Macdonald	1,655	28.1
Majority		759	12.9
Labour hold			

=== Pilton/Muirhouse ===
Pilton/Muirhouse
Party	Candidate	Votes	%
Labour	N. Lindsay	2,501	70.0
Liberal	W. H. Bailey	532	14.9
Conservative	J. Johnston	455	12.7
Independent	C. McManus	85	2.4
Majority		1,969	55.1
Labour hold			

=== Craigsbank/Carrickknowe ===
Craigsbank/Carrickknowe
Party	Candidate	Votes	%
Liberal	D. C. E. Gorrie	2,728	48.8
Conservative	Lynn F. Scott	2,084	37.2
Labour	A. Howden	784	14.0
Majority		644	11.6
Liberal hold			

=== Corstorphine/Drumbrae ===
Corstorphine/Drumbrae
Party	Candidate	Votes	%
Conservative	G. A. Theurer	2,235	41.5
Liberal	Joyce Shein	1,753	32.6
Labour	J. E. Boyack	1,397	25.9
Majority		482	8.9
Conservative hold			

=== Murrayfield/Blackhall ===
Murrayfield/Blackhall
Party	Candidate	Votes	%
Conservative	R. M. Knox	4,127	71.9
Liberal	T. Glen	998	17.4
Labour	R. J. E. Marks	618	10.8
Majority		3,129	54.5
Conservative hold			

=== Cramond/Barnton ===
Cramond/Barnton
Party	Candidate	Votes	%
Conservative	G. G. Norval	3,662	57.4
Labour	R. H. Macintosh	1,415	22.2
Liberal	E. S. Loveday	1,304	20.4
Majority		2,247	35.2
Conservative hold			

=== Drylaw/Comely Bank ===
Drylaw/Comely Bank
Party	Candidate	Votes	%
Conservative	Winifred E. Donaldson	2,749	56.4
Labour	R. D. Anderson	2,129	43.6
Majority		620	12.8
Conservative hold			

=== Dean/St. Andrews ===
Dean/St. Andrews
Party	Candidate	Votes	%
Conservative	I. A. Cramond	3,068	59.9
Liberal	C. S. Waterman	1,234	23.3
Labour	H. R. Wagstaff	998	18.8
Majority		1,834	36.6
Conservative hold			

=== Pilrig/Calton ===
Pilrig/Calton
Party	Candidate	Votes	%
Labour	J. Cook	2,965	54.2
Conservative	J. L. Walls	2,503	45.8
Majority		462	8.4
Labour hold			

=== Broughton/Inverleith ===
Broughton/Inverleith
Party	Candidate	Votes	%
Conservative	W. R. V. Percy	3,246	48.7
Labour	J. Godfrey	1,738	26.1
Liberal	R. Guild	1,684	25.3
Majority		1,508	22.6
Conservative hold			

=== Royston/Granton ===
Royston/Granton
Party	Candidate	Votes	%
Labour	R. Brown	1,834	49.0
SNP	G. W. Telford	1,143	30.5
Conservative	W. Alexander	770	20.5
Majority		691	18.5
Labour hold			

=== Trinity/Newhaven ===
Trinity/Newhaven
Party	Candidate	Votes	%
Conservative	H. A. Nicholson	3,974	64.7
Labour	A. Findlay	2,172	35.3
Majority		1,802	29.4
Conservative hold			

=== Harbour/Bonnington ===
Harbour/Bonnington
Party	Candidate	Votes	%
Labour	J. A. Crichton	2,778	70.8
Conservative	Elizabeth M. Brodie	1,145	29.2
Majority		1,633	41.6
Labour hold			

=== Links/Lorne ===
Links/Lorne
Party	Candidate	Votes	%
Conservative	C. Waugh	3,122	55.5
Labour	J. Anderson	2,506	44.5
Majority		616	11.0
Conservative hold			

=== Willowbrae/Craigentinny ===
Willowbrae/Craigentinny
Party	Candidate	Votes	%
Labour	Phyllis Herriot	3,334	62.2
Conservative	J. A. H. Clark	1,941	36.2
Communist	C. B. Swan	85	1.6
Majority		1,393	26.0
Labour hold			

=== Jocks' Lodge/Portobello ===
Jocks' Lodge/Portobello
Party	Candidate	Votes	%
Conservative	K. W. Borthwick	4,143	62.5
Labour	G. Alexander	2,481	37.5
Majority		1,662	25.0
Conservative hold			

=== Duddingston/Milton ===
Duddingston/Milton
Party	Candidate	Votes	%
Conservative	J. S. Cavaye	2,675	53.0
Labour	Mary Hutcheson	2,377	47.1
Majority		298	5.9
Conservative hold			

=== Niddrie/Craigmillar ===
Niddrie/Craigmillar
Party	Candidate	Votes	%
Labour	J. Kane	3,312	75.6
SNP	W. K. Archibald	974	22.2
Communist	Irene Swan	93	2.1
Majority		2,338	53.4
Labour hold			
