= 1974 Highland Regional Council election =

1974 Scottish local government election

| 7 May 1974 | 1978 → |

All 47 seats to Highland Regional Council 24 seats needed for a majority

| | First party | Second party | Third party |
|---|---|---|---|
| Party | Independent | Labour | Liberal |
| Seats won | 37 | 4 | 3 |
| Popular vote | 43,943 | 4,918 | 5,495 |
| Percentage | 72.1% | 8.1% | 9.0% |
| | Fourth party | Fifth party |
| Party | Conservative | SNP |
| Seats won | 2 | 1 |
| Popular vote | 1,126 | 5,434 |
| Percentage | 1.8% | 8.9% |
Council Convener after election
Murdo Nicolson
Independent

The first election to Highland Regional Council was held on 7 May 1974 as part of the wider 1974 Scottish local elections. The election saw Independents win control of 37 of the councils 47 seats.

== Aggregate results ==
Highland Regional election, 1974 Turnout: 58.2%
| Party | Seats | Gains | Losses | Net gain/loss | Seats % | Votes % | Votes | +/− |
|---|---|---|---|---|---|---|---|---|
| Independent | 37 | | | | 78.7 | 72.1 | 43,943 | |
| Labour | 4 | | | | 8.5 | 8.1 | 4,918 | |
| Liberal | 3 | | | | 6.4 | 9.0 | 5,495 | |
| Conservative | 2 | | | | 4.3 | 1.8 | 1,126 | |
| SNP | 1 | | | | 2.1 | 8.9 | 5,434 | |
