= 1974 Dumfries and Galloway Regional Council election =

1974 Scottish local government election

7 May 1974	1978 →

All 35 seats to Dumfries and Galloway Regional Council 18 seats needed for a majority
- Turnout: 46.9%
	First party	Second party
Party	Independent	Labour
Seats won	33	2
Popular vote	25,069	3,436
Percentage	81.7%	11.2%

The first Dumfries and Galloway regional council election took place on 7 May 1974, along with the first district council elections in Scotland. This new system was created by the Local Government (Scotland) Act 1973, which saw the making of a two-tier system of local government. The area Dumfries and Galloway regional council covered also contained 4 district councils:

- Annandale and Eskdale
- Nithsdale
- Merrick
- Stewartry

Turnout was low and 12 out of the 35 wards in Dumfries and Galloway were uncontested.

== Results ==
1974 Dumfries and Galloway Regional Council election result
Party	Seats	Gains	Losses	Net gain/loss	Seats %	Votes %	Votes	+/−
Independent	33	-	-		94.3	81.7	25,069	New
Labour	2	-	-		5.7	11.2	3,436	New
Democratic Socialist Labour Party	0	-	-		0.0	5.3	1,628	New
SNP	0	-	-		0.0	1.2	359	New
Tenants association	0	-	-		0.0	0.7	210	New
