= Large burgh =

- Category: Burgh
- Location: Scotland
- Found in: Counties
- Created by: Local Government (Scotland) Act 1929
- Created: 1930
- Abolished by: Local Government (Scotland) Act 1973
- Abolished: 1975

Large burgh was a type of municipal structure in Scotland, which existed from 1930 to 1975.

== History ==
When county councils had been established in 1890 under the Local Government (Scotland) Act 1889, there were 26 burghs which were excluded from county council control. Many other burghs were within the area controlled by county councils, having various functions as lower-tier authorities. The Local Government (Scotland) Act 1929 made extensive reforms to the structure of local government, including bringing all but four burghs under the control of a county council; the exceptions were Aberdeen, Dundee, Edinburgh, and Glasgow, which were all classed as counties of cities.

The burghs under county council control after 1930 were then classed as either small burghs or large burghs. Whilst the county councils provided some services in large burghs (notably education), the large burghs retained extensive responsibilities. The list of large burghs substantially overlapped with the list of burghs which had been outside county council control prior to 1930.

The large burghs were:

- Airdrie
- Arbroath
- Ayr
- Clydebank
- Coatbridge
- Dumbarton
- Dumfries
- Dunfermline
- East Kilbride (made a large burgh in 1967)
- Falkirk
- Greenock
- Hamilton
- Inverness
- Kilmarnock
- Kirkcaldy
- Motherwell and Wishaw
- Paisley
- Perth
- Port Glasgow
- Rutherglen
- Stirling

Of the large burghs created in 1930, only four had not been previously independent from a county council, being Clydebank, Coatbridge, Falkirk, and Rutherglen. Conversely, there were six burghs which had previously been independent but were not made large burghs in 1930, being Brechin, Elgin, Forfar, Galashiels, Hawick, and Montrose.

All burghs in Scotland were abolished in 1975 and replaced with the uniform system of districts and regions, which is itself now defunct. (See Subdivisions of Scotland for the modern units of local government in the country.)

== See also ==
- Local Government (Scotland) Act 1929
- Local Government (Scotland) Act 1947
