= Royal Commission on Local Government in Scotland =

Commission on local government in Scotland

The Royal Commission on Local Government in Scotland, usually called the Wheatley Commission or the Wheatley Report (Cmnd. 4150), was published in September 1969 by the chairmanship of Lord Wheatley. Its recommendations led to a new system of regional and district councils, introduced in 1975 by the Local Government (Scotland) Act 1973.

== Background ==
By the 1960s there was general agreement that the system of local government in Scotland was in need of reform. There were more than four hundred local authorities: 33 county councils (4 of which were paired as "joint county councils" for most purposes), 4 county of city corporations, 197 town councils (administering 21 large burghs and 176 small burghs) and 196 district councils. These structures had mainly been introduced in the late 19th century, and were largely based on units that dated back to the Middle Ages. There was also no clear division of functions between counties, burghs and districts.

The Conservative government published a white paper in June 1963 entitled The Modernisation of Local Government in Scotland (Cmnd.2067). They proposed a reduction in the number of units by the amalgamation of existing authorities. The number of counties would be reduced to between 10 and 15, and they would be given responsibility for major services such as police, education and water supply. Below the counties would be a second tier of councils (which were not named) formed by merging burghs and districts exercising powers over purely local services. It was envisaged that these council areas would have a population of not less than 40,000. The four counties of cities would continue as unitary authorities with enlarged boundaries where appropriate.

Following a change of government, William Ross, the Secretary of State for Scotland in the new Labour Party administration, indicated in March 1965 that he did not intend to follow the policy of his predecessor. In February 1966 the Prime Minister, Harold Wilson, announced to the Commons that a royal commission would be appointed to review local administration in Scotland.

== Membership of the commission ==
The royal commission was appointed in May 1966, and had nine members:

- Lord Wheatley, former Solicitor General for Scotland and Lord Advocate, Labour Party member of parliament for Edinburgh East 1947 – 1954.
- Betty Harvie Anderson, Conservative MP for East Renfrewshire and a former member of Stirling County Council.
- Henry Ballantyne, chairman and managing director of Ballantyne's Knitwear, and a member of the Scottish Economic Planning Council and a former provost of Innerleithen.
- Thomas Fraser, Labour MP for Hamilton and former Secretary of State for Transport.
- Ames Lyell Imrie, City Chamberlain of Edinburgh.
- Russell Johnston Liberal MP for Inverness.
- James McBoyle, vice-president of the Royal Institute of Public Administration and former county clerk for Midlothian.
- H T MacCalman, Chairman of the Clyde Valley Regional Planning Committee, senior partner in a Glasgow legal firm and an ex-member of Glasgow Corporation
- Patrick Connor, regional officer for Scotland for the Amalgamated Engineering Union and member of the Scottish Economic Planning Council.

== Evidence heard ==
The Commission heard evidence from a number of interested parties. There was general agreement that there needed to be a reduction in the number of local authorities, and that a new two-tier structure should be formed. Among the bodies that gave evidence were:

- The National Association of Local Government Officers suggested a system of five regional councils and 60 local councils. The regions would have responsibility for education and social welfare, with other services provided at the local level. The councils would be empowered to levy a local income tax to finance their activities. There should also be a permanent local government advisory council, with the duty of reviewing the structures and functions of the authorities on an ongoing basis. An ombudsman should also be appointed to address disputes.
- The Confederation of British Industry also supported a two-tier structure.
- The Council of Scottish Chambers of Commerce envisaged the new upper tier having responsibility for major services such as police, fire services, planning and education. They stressed the importance of maintaining a number of independent police forces in Scotland, rejecting a centralised system as "undesirable and even dangerous".

== The report ==
The commission published its report on 25 September 1969. In the report it was recognised that were four levels of community in Scotland:

- The region
- The district or shire
- The locality (of which there were 100 to 150)
- The parish (of which there were about 800)

=== Division of functions ===
The majority of the commissioners, as expected, recommended a two-tier structure, split between the regional and district level. However, they also suggested that the locality and parish levels could be given a "voice". This would be done by regional authorities choosing to establish "local committees" and by the creation of non-statutory community councils where there was demand. Community councils might be permitted to operate some local services on an agency basis on behalf of district or regional councils.

Regions were to have powers over major planning, social services, housing, police and education; districts over local planning, planning applications, building control, libraries and licensing.

=== Membership and finance ===
All members of the proposed councils were to be directly elected, with a four-year term of office. It would be permissible to be a member of both a regional and district council, but an employee of the authority would be ineligible for election. There was to be no upper age limit for candidates. Elections were to be held every two years at either the regional or district level. Councillors were to receive payment for their services, as it was felt that local representatives often made considerable financial sacrifices, and there was no allowance for secretarial or administration costs. Both levels of council were to levy taxes to fund their activities, as this would make them more directly accountable to their electorates.

=== Local government areas ===
The report divided Scotland into seven regions, subdivided into thirty-seven districts. They are described in the table below in terms of the existing counties and counties of cities.

The regions and districts proposed by the Wheatley Commission

Region	Existing counties and counties of cities	Districts
Central	Clackmannanshire; Part of Fife (south-western area around Culross); Part of Perthshire (the burghs of Callander, Doune and Dunblane, most of the Western District and the parish of Ardoch); Stirlingshire (except the Kilsyth and the area adjacent to Loch Lomond); Part of West Lothian (north-western area around Linlithgow)	1. Areas from Perthshire and Stirlingshire
Central	Clackmannanshire; Part of Fife (south-western area around Culross); Part of Perthshire (the burghs of Callander, Doune and Dunblane, most of the Western District and the parish of Ardoch); Stirlingshire (except the Kilsyth and the area adjacent to Loch Lomond); Part of West Lothian (north-western area around Linlithgow)	2. Areas from Clackmannanshire, Fife and West Lothian
East	Angus; County of the City of Dundee; Part of Fife (eastern area including Cupar and St Andrews); Part of Kincardineshire (southern area including Inverbervie, Laurencekirk and St Cyrus); Kinross-shire; Perthshire (except parts in Central Region)	3. Dundee and surrounding areas including Longforgan from Perthshire, Monifieth from Angus, Newport on Tay and Tayport from Fife
East	Angus; County of the City of Dundee; Part of Fife (eastern area including Cupar and St Andrews); Part of Kincardineshire (southern area including Inverbervie, Laurencekirk and St Cyrus); Kinross-shire; Perthshire (except parts in Central Region)	4. Angus (except areas in Dundee district), area from Kincardineshire
East	Angus; County of the City of Dundee; Part of Fife (eastern area including Cupar and St Andrews); Part of Kincardineshire (southern area including Inverbervie, Laurencekirk and St Cyrus); Kinross-shire; Perthshire (except parts in Central Region)	5. Area from Fife (except areas in Dundee district)
East	Angus; County of the City of Dundee; Part of Fife (eastern area including Cupar and St Andrews); Part of Kincardineshire (southern area including Inverbervie, Laurencekirk and St Cyrus); Kinross-shire; Perthshire (except parts in Central Region)	6. Kinross-shire and area from Perthshire
Highlands and Islands	Argyll (less Cowal area); Banffshire (south west only); Caithness; Inverness-shire; Part of Moray (the burgh of Grantown-on-Spey and the District of Cromdale); Nairnshire; Orkney; Ross and Cromarty; Sutherland; Zetland	7. Caithness and north east Sutherland
Highlands and Islands	Argyll (less Cowal area); Banffshire (south west only); Caithness; Inverness-shire; Part of Moray (the burgh of Grantown-on-Spey and the District of Cromdale); Nairnshire; Orkney; Ross and Cromarty; Sutherland; Zetland	8. Most of Sutherland and Tain area of Ross and Cromarty
Highlands and Islands	Argyll (less Cowal area); Banffshire (south west only); Caithness; Inverness-shire; Part of Moray (the burgh of Grantown-on-Spey and the District of Cromdale); Nairnshire; Orkney; Ross and Cromarty; Sutherland; Zetland	9. Most of mainland Ross and Cromarty
Highlands and Islands	Argyll (less Cowal area); Banffshire (south west only); Caithness; Inverness-shire; Part of Moray (the burgh of Grantown-on-Spey and the District of Cromdale); Nairnshire; Orkney; Ross and Cromarty; Sutherland; Zetland	10. Western Isles
Highlands and Islands	Argyll (less Cowal area); Banffshire (south west only); Caithness; Inverness-shire; Part of Moray (the burgh of Grantown-on-Spey and the District of Cromdale); Nairnshire; Orkney; Ross and Cromarty; Sutherland; Zetland	11. Lochaber area of Inverness-shire, Isle of Skye, north west Argyll
Highlands and Islands	Argyll (less Cowal area); Banffshire (south west only); Caithness; Inverness-shire; Part of Moray (the burgh of Grantown-on-Spey and the District of Cromdale); Nairnshire; Orkney; Ross and Cromarty; Sutherland; Zetland	12. Southern and western Argyll
Highlands and Islands	Argyll (less Cowal area); Banffshire (south west only); Caithness; Inverness-shire; Part of Moray (the burgh of Grantown-on-Spey and the District of Cromdale); Nairnshire; Orkney; Ross and Cromarty; Sutherland; Zetland	13. Nairnshire, east Inverness-shire, southern Moray, southern Banffshire
Highlands and Islands	Argyll (less Cowal area); Banffshire (south west only); Caithness; Inverness-shire; Part of Moray (the burgh of Grantown-on-Spey and the District of Cromdale); Nairnshire; Orkney; Ross and Cromarty; Sutherland; Zetland	14. Orkney and Shetland
North East	County of the City of Aberdeen; Aberdeenshire; Banffshire (less area in Highlands and Islands); Kincardineshire (less area in East region); Moray (except area in Highlands and Islands)	15. City of Aberdeen and adjoining areas of Aberdeenshire and Kincardineshire
North East	County of the City of Aberdeen; Aberdeenshire; Banffshire (less area in Highlands and Islands); Kincardineshire (less area in East region); Moray (except area in Highlands and Islands)	16. Eastern Banffshire and north west Aberdeenshire
North East	County of the City of Aberdeen; Aberdeenshire; Banffshire (less area in Highlands and Islands); Kincardineshire (less area in East region); Moray (except area in Highlands and Islands)	17. Moray and western Banffshire
North East	County of the City of Aberdeen; Aberdeenshire; Banffshire (less area in Highlands and Islands); Kincardineshire (less area in East region); Moray (except area in Highlands and Islands)	18. Central and southern Aberdeenshire, northern Kincardineshire
South East	East Lothian; County of the City of Edinburgh; Fife (except areas in Central and East regions); Midlothian; Peebles-shire; Roxburghshire (less Castleton and Newcastleton areas); Selkirkshire; West Lothian (less area in Central region)	19. Berwickshire, Peebles-shire, Roxburghshire (less areas in South West region), Herot and sow area of Midlothian
South East	East Lothian; County of the City of Edinburgh; Fife (except areas in Central and East regions); Midlothian; Peebles-shire; Roxburghshire (less Castleton and Newcastleton areas); Selkirkshire; West Lothian (less area in Central region)	20. East Lothian and most of Midlothian
South East	East Lothian; County of the City of Edinburgh; Fife (except areas in Central and East regions); Midlothian; Peebles-shire; Roxburghshire (less Castleton and Newcastleton areas); Selkirkshire; West Lothian (less area in Central region)	21. City of Edinburgh and surrounding areas of Midlothian and West Lothian
South East	East Lothian; County of the City of Edinburgh; Fife (except areas in Central and East regions); Midlothian; Peebles-shire; Roxburghshire (less Castleton and Newcastleton areas); Selkirkshire; West Lothian (less area in Central region)	22. West Lothian
South East	East Lothian; County of the City of Edinburgh; Fife (except areas in Central and East regions); Midlothian; Peebles-shire; Roxburghshire (less Castleton and Newcastleton areas); Selkirkshire; West Lothian (less area in Central region)	23. Part of Fife centred on Dunfermline
South East	East Lothian; County of the City of Edinburgh; Fife (except areas in Central and East regions); Midlothian; Peebles-shire; Roxburghshire (less Castleton and Newcastleton areas); Selkirkshire; West Lothian (less area in Central region)	24. Part of Fife centred on Kirkcaldy
South West	Dumfriesshire; Kirkcudbright; Part of Roxburghshire (Castleton and Newcastleton areas); Wigtownshire	25. Wigtownshire
South West	Dumfriesshire; Kirkcudbright; Part of Roxburghshire (Castleton and Newcastleton areas); Wigtownshire	26. Dumfriesshire, Kirkcudbright, part of Roxburghshire
West	Part of Argyll (Cowal); Ayrshire; Bute; Dunbartonshire; County of the City of Glasgow; Lanarkshire; Renfrewshire; Part of Stirlingshire (Kilsyth area)	27. Southern Ayrshire
West	Part of Argyll (Cowal); Ayrshire; Bute; Dunbartonshire; County of the City of Glasgow; Lanarkshire; Renfrewshire; Part of Stirlingshire (Kilsyth area)	28. Northern Ayrshire, part of Lanarkshire (Hamilton and East Kilbride areas) and part of Bute (Isle of Arran and Isle of Cumbrae)
West	Part of Argyll (Cowal); Ayrshire; Bute; Dunbartonshire; County of the City of Glasgow; Lanarkshire; Renfrewshire; Part of Stirlingshire (Kilsyth area)	29. Part of Argyllshire (Cowal) and Part of Bute (Isle of Bute)
West	Part of Argyll (Cowal); Ayrshire; Bute; Dunbartonshire; County of the City of Glasgow; Lanarkshire; Renfrewshire; Part of Stirlingshire (Kilsyth area)	30. Southern Lanarkshire including Biggar and Lanark
West	Part of Argyll (Cowal); Ayrshire; Bute; Dunbartonshire; County of the City of Glasgow; Lanarkshire; Renfrewshire; Part of Stirlingshire (Kilsyth area)	31. Part of Lanarkshire around Motherwell
West	Part of Argyll (Cowal); Ayrshire; Bute; Dunbartonshire; County of the City of Glasgow; Lanarkshire; Renfrewshire; Part of Stirlingshire (Kilsyth area)	32. Western Dunbartonshire
West	Part of Argyll (Cowal); Ayrshire; Bute; Dunbartonshire; County of the City of Glasgow; Lanarkshire; Renfrewshire; Part of Stirlingshire (Kilsyth area)	33. Western Renfrewshire including Greenock and Port Glasgow
West	Part of Argyll (Cowal); Ayrshire; Bute; Dunbartonshire; County of the City of Glasgow; Lanarkshire; Renfrewshire; Part of Stirlingshire (Kilsyth area)	34. Part of Lanarkshire around Coatbridge
West	Part of Argyll (Cowal); Ayrshire; Bute; Dunbartonshire; County of the City of Glasgow; Lanarkshire; Renfrewshire; Part of Stirlingshire (Kilsyth area)	35. Part of Dunbartonshire (Cumbernauld area), part of Stirlingshire (Kilsyth area)
West	Part of Argyll (Cowal); Ayrshire; Bute; Dunbartonshire; County of the City of Glasgow; Lanarkshire; Renfrewshire; Part of Stirlingshire (Kilsyth area)	36. Most of Renfrewshire
West	Part of Argyll (Cowal); Ayrshire; Bute; Dunbartonshire; County of the City of Glasgow; Lanarkshire; Renfrewshire; Part of Stirlingshire (Kilsyth area)	37. Glasgow and surrounding areas of Dunbartonshire, Lanarkshire and Renfrewshire including Bearsden, Clydebank, Bishopbriggs and Rutherglen

=== Minority report ===
Two members of the commission (Anderson and Johnston) dissented on the number of districts that should be created and on the division of powers, feeling that local planning should be a regional function and that the second tier should be formed at the "locality" level with as many as 101 authorities.

They also felt that Shetland, Orkney and the Western Isles should have a special status between that of region and district.

== Reaction and subsequent legislation ==
Following the publication of the report there was a twelve-week period in which the existing local authorities could give their response. The report was debated in the House of Commons on 14 October 1969. The Secretary of State stated that following the receipt of the councils' observations the government would produce a white paper with final decisions on structures, boundaries and functions.

Following the 1970 general election the Conservatives returned to power, and in February 1971 produced a white paper Reform of Local Government in Scotland (Cmnd. 4583). This broadly accepted the report's recommendations but increased the number of regions to eight by separating the Borders from the South East region. There were some changes in regional boundaries while the districts of Shetland and Orkney were to become "special areas", with the Highlands and Islands region renamed "Highlands". The number of remaining districts was increased by 14 from 35 to 49.

Local authorities were asked to make their observations on the proposals by 30 April 1971.

On 22 December 1971 the Secretary of State, Gordon Campbell, made a parliamentary statement outlining the government's response to the observations received.

The main points that had been raised were:

- The West Region was too large.
- Residents of Fife, which was divided between three regions, wanted it to form a separate region.
- The Western Isles comprising Lewis, Harris, the Uists and Barra should be a special area with status similar to Orkney and Shetland.

The government accepted the formation of a Western Isles islands area, but rejected the creation of a Fife region. The number of districts on the mainland was to be unchanged, although there were 19 changes to district boundaries, including the transfer of Newport, Tayport and adjacent parishes transferred from Dundee district to North Fife. In addition there were to be six changes to regional boundaries. The number and boundaries of the new authorities were confirmed in a circular, along with suggested names. Among changes to regional names were Forth (South East), Strathclyde (West) Dumfries and Galloway (South West).

The Local Government (Scotland) Bill was introduced to the Commons on 17 November 1972. During the passage of the bill through Parliament a number of changes were made:

- Fife became a separate region.
- The Forth region, having lost an area to the new Fife region was renamed Lothian.
- Strathclyde was increased in size.
- The number of districts in Strathclyde was increased from 13 to 19: 4 were broken off from Glasgow District, while 2 were formed in Ayrshire.
- There were a number of boundary changes to districts.

The bill was given royal assent as the Local Government (Scotland) Act 1973 on 25 October 1973, and on 16 May 1975 the system of nine regions, 53 districts and 3 islands areas came into existence.
