= Small burgh =

- Category: Burgh
- Location: Scotland
- Found in: Counties
- Created by: Local Government (Scotland) Act 1929
- Created: 1930
- Abolished by: Local Government (Scotland) Act 1973
- Abolished: 1975

A small burgh was a unit of local government in Scotland created by the Local Government (Scotland) Act 1929 in 1930. The Act reclassified existing burghs into two classes, large and small burghs. While large burghs became largely independent of the county councils of the county in which they lay, small burghs lost many of their powers to the county authority. Small burghs were responsible for such matters as housing, lighting and street cleaning and drainage. Police forces maintained by small burghs were merged with the county force.

Small burghs were abolished in 1975 by the Local Government (Scotland) Act 1973, with the administration of their areas passing to new district councils within the regions, or to islands area councils established under the Act. In many cases community councils were established to represent the views of the townspeople.

For a complete list of small burghs see List of local government areas in Scotland 1930 - 1975.
