= 1974 Scottish local elections =

- 7 May 1974
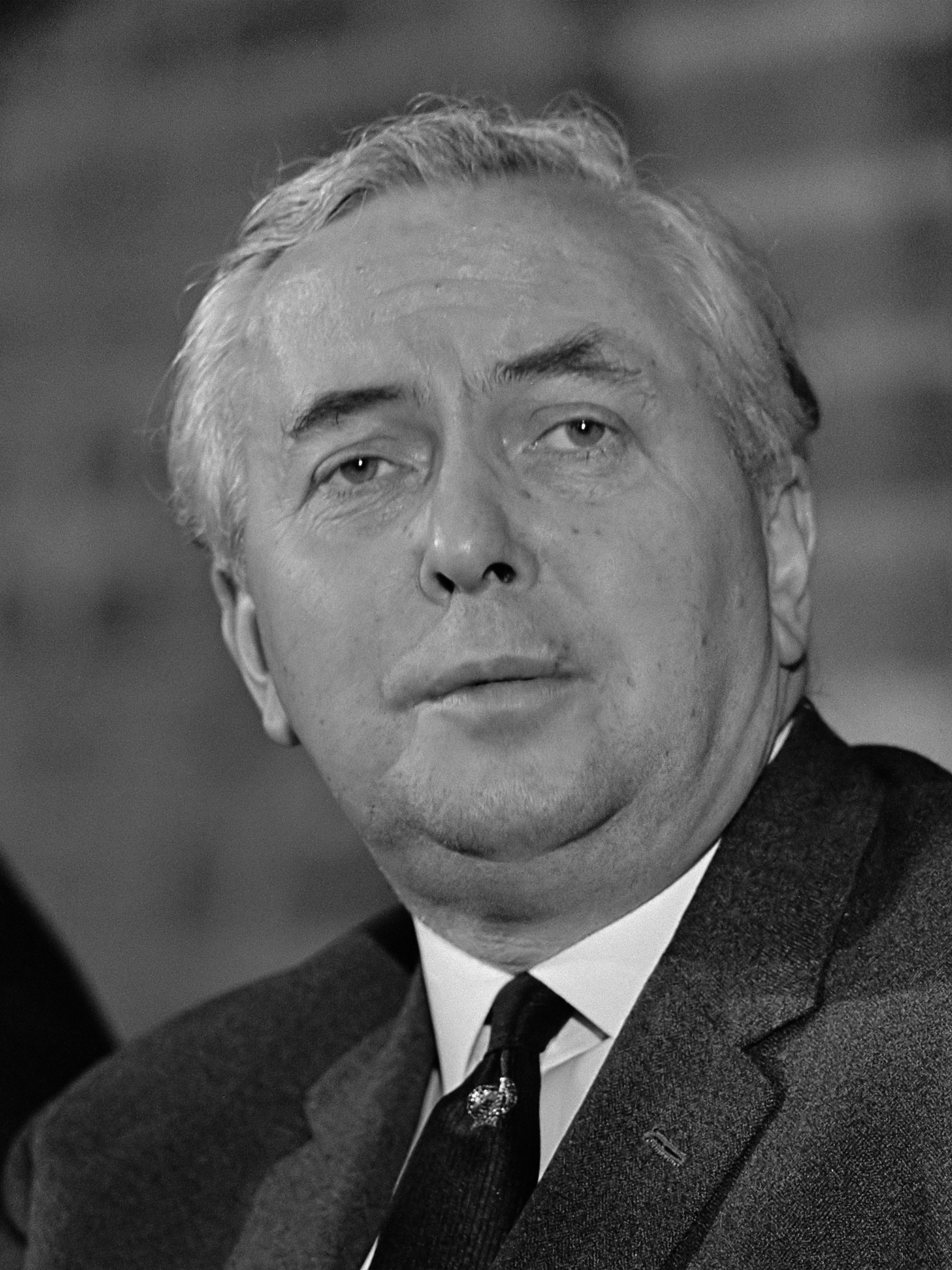

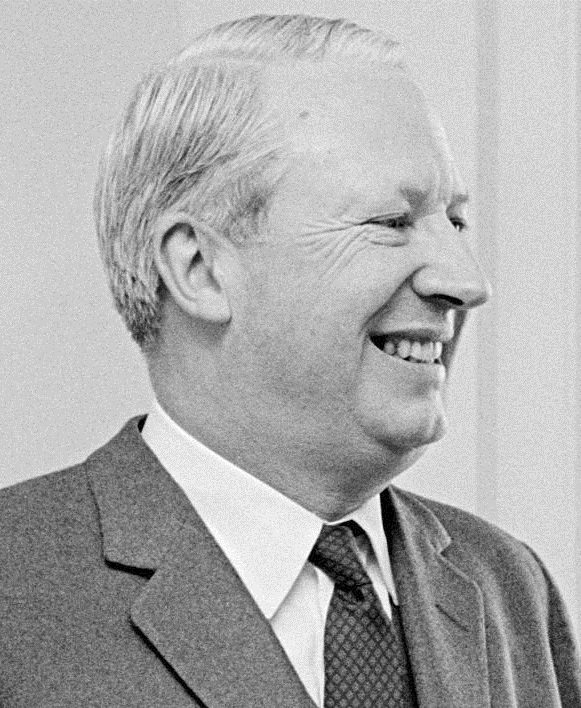
	First party	Second party
Leader	Harold Wilson	Edward Heath
Party	Labour	Conservative
Leader since	14 February 1963	28 July 1965
	Third party	Fourth party
Leader	William Wolfe	Jeremy Thorpe
Party	SNP	Liberal
Leader since	1 June 1969	18 January 1967

Elections for the Scottish district councils were held on Tuesday 7 May 1974, for both the new regional and district councils, between the two United Kingdom general elections of February and October in that same year.

These were the first elections held to the 53 district councils established by the Local Government (Scotland) Act 1973. The Labour Party did reasonably well and the Scottish National Party (SNP) did not. The councillors acted as "shadow" councils until May 1975, when the provisions of the Local Government (Scotland) Act 1973 came into effect.

== Results ==
=== National results ===
Result of the Regional elections.

Summary of the 1974 Scottish local regional election results
Parties	Votes	%	Wards
Labour	658,089	38.5	172
Conservative	488,905	28.6	112
SNP	215,502	12.6	18
Liberal	87,333	5.1	11
Independent/Other	261,372	15.3	119
Total	1,711,201	100.0	432

Result of the District elections.

Summary of the 1974 Scottish District local council election results
Parties	Votes	%	Wards
Labour	619,531	38.4	428
Conservative	433,287	26.8	241
SNP	200,307	12.4	62
Liberal	80,232	5.0	17
Independent/Other	280,946	17.5	362
Total	1,614,303	100.0	1,110

Note: Orkney, Shetland, and the Western Isles were governed at the district level as unitary authorities, meaning they were not included in any larger region.

=== Council Results ===
==== Regional Councils ====
Region	Labour	Conservative	SNP	Liberal	Independent	Other	Turnout	Total Seats	Control	Details
Borders	0	7	0	3	13	0		29	Independent	Details
Central	17	4	9	0	3	1		34	Labour	Details
Dumfries and Galloway	2	0	0	0	33	0		35	Independent	Details
Fife	26	10	0	0	3	3 (1 Communist)		42	Labour	Details
Grampian	13	28	0	2	10	0		53	Conservative	Details
Highland	4	2	1	3	37	0		47	Independent	Details
Lothian	24	19	3	1	1	1		49	No overall control	Details
Orkney									Independent	Details
Shetland									Independent	Details
Strathclyde	71	20	5	2	5	0		103	Labour	Details
Tayside	15	22	0	0	9	0		46	No overall control	Details
Na h-Eileanan Siar (Western Isles)									Independent	Details

==== District Councils ====
Region	Labour	Conservative	SNP	Liberal	Independent	Other	Turnout	Total Seats
Borders	1	9	0	0	44	0		54
Central	29	9	21	0	8	0		67
Dumfries and Galloway	5	1	1	0	61	2		70
Fife	43	24	2	1	10	4		84
Grampian	30	25	1	4	48	0		108
Highland	4	0	4	2	99	0		109
Lothian	62	38	8	3	5	1		127
Orkney								
Shetland								
Strathclyde	225	92	25	7	49	8		406
Tayside	29	43	0	0	21	1		94
Na h-Eileanan Siar (Western Isles)								

The seats on each district council after the election were as follows:

===== Borders =====
District	Labour	Conservative	Liberal	Independent	Other	Control
Berwickshire	0	10	0	2	0	Conservative
Ettrick and Lauderdale	1	0	0	14	0	Independent
Roxburgh	0	0	0	13	Border Independents 3	Independent
Tweeddale	0	0	0	10	0	Independent

===== Central =====
District	Labour	Conservative	SNP	Liberal	Independent	Other	Control
Clackmannan	5	1	5	0	0	Scottish Labour 1	No overall control
Falkirk	16	2	12	0	3	Independent Labour 1 Non-Party 2	No overall control
Stirling	7	8	4	0	1	0	NOC

===== Dumfries and Galloway =====
District	Labour	Conservative	SNP	Independent	Other	Control
Annandale and Eskdale	0	0	0	14	0	Independent
Nithsdale	6	1	1	17	Non-Party 5	Independent
Stewartry	0	0	0	12	0	Independent
Wigtown	0	0	0	14	0	Independent

===== Fife =====
District	Labour	Conservative	SNP	Liberal	Independent	Other	Control
Dunfermline	17	5	3	1	4	0	Labour
Kirkcaldy	24	5	0	0	2	Ratepayers 4 Communist 1	NOC
North-East Fife	0	13	0	0	5	0	Conservative

===== Grampian =====
District	Labour	Conservative	SNP	Liberal	Independent	Control
Banff and Buchan	0	0	0	0	18	Independent
City of Aberdeen	28	17	0	3	0	Labour
Gordon	0	3	0	2	7	Independent
Kincardine and Deeside	0	2	0	0	10	Independent
Moray	0	0	1	0	17	Independent

===== Highland =====
District	Labour	SNP	Independent	Control
Badenoch and Strathspey	0	0	10	Independent hold
Caithness	0	0	15	Independent hold
Inverness	0	0	15	Independent hold
Lochaber 2 vacancies	3	0	7	Independent
Nairn	0	3	7	Independent
Ross and Cromarty	0	0	20	Independent hold
Skye and Lochalsh	0	0	10	Independent
Sutherland	0	0	14	Independent

===== Lothian =====
District	Labour	Conservative	SNP	Liberal	Independent	Control
City of Edinburgh	27	31	2	3	1	No overall control
East Lothian	10	6	0	0	1	Labour
Midlothian	11	2	1	0	1	Labour
West Lothian	10	0	8	0	3	NOC

===== Strathclyde =====
District	Labour	Conservative	SNP	Liberal	Independent	Others	Control
Argyll and Bute 1 vacancy	0	0	0	0	25	0	Independent
Bearsden and Milngavie	1	5	0	0	4	0	No overall control
Clydebank	5	1	3	0	0	Scottish Labour 1	Labour
Cumbernauld and Kilsyth	3	0	7	0	0	0	SNP
Cumnock and Doon Valley	8	1	0	0	1		Labour
Cunninghame	14	0	1	0	2	Moderate Conservatives 7	Labour
Dumbarton	8	2	0	0	5	0	Labour
East Kilbride	5	2	7	0	1	0	No overall control
Eastwood	0	10	0	0	0	Ratepayers 2	Conservative
City of Glasgow	54	16	1	0	0	Independent Conservative 1	Labour
Hamilton	13	2	2	2	1	Independent Labour 0	Labour
Inverclyde	14	2	0	6	1	0	Labour
Kilmarnock and Loudoun	12	4	0	0	0	0	Labour
Kyle and Carrick	10	15	0	0	0	0	Conservative
Lanark	4	0	2	0	8	0	Independent
Motherwell	25	1	2	1	1	Communist 0	Labour
Monklands	15	4	1	0	1	0	Labour
Renfrew	25	10	1	0	3	CA 1	Labour
Strathkelvin	6	5	3	0	0	0	No overall control

===== Tayside =====
District	Labour	Conservative	SNP	Independent	Others	Control
Angus	3	11	0	8	0	Conservative
City of Dundee	22	20	0	2	Real Labour 1 Monifeith Ratepayers 0	NOC
Perth and Kinross	4	19	0	6	0	Conservative

== See also ==
- Local government areas of Scotland 1973 to 1996
- Local Government Boundary Commission for Scotland
