= 1977 United Kingdom local elections =

- 3 May 1977 (Scotland); 5 May 1977 (England & Wales); 18 May 1977 (Northern Ireland)

1 Unicameral area, all 6 metropolitan counties, all 39 non-metropolitan counties, 1 sui generis authority, all 26 Northern Irish districts, all 53 Scottish districts and all 8 Welsh counties
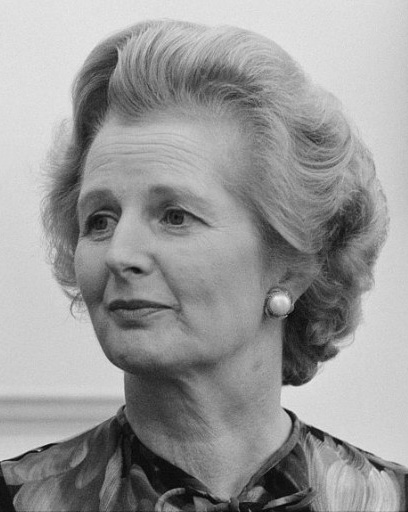

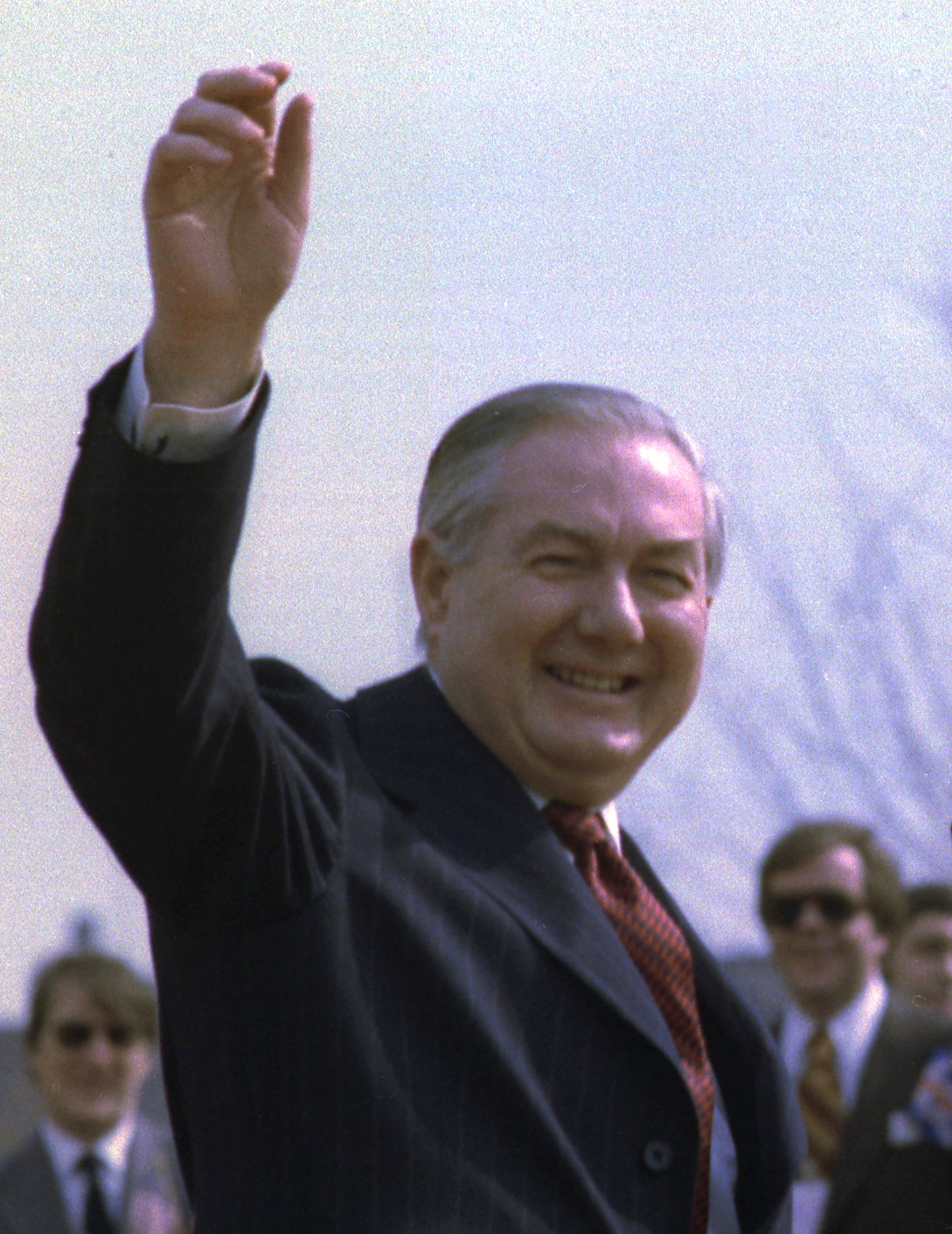

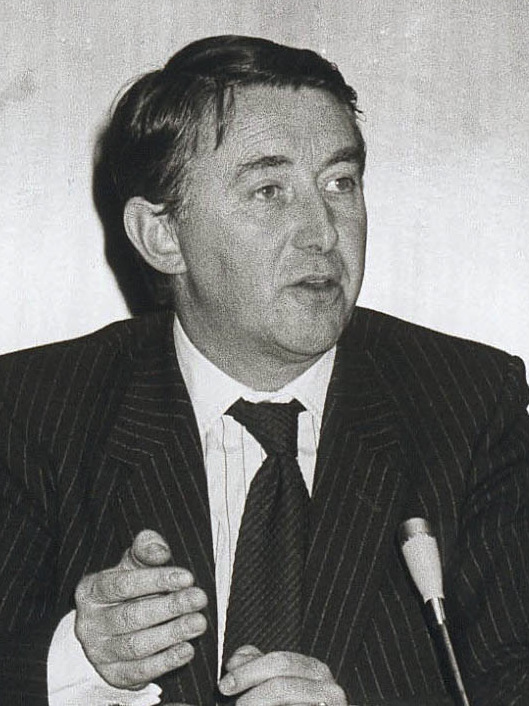
	Majority party	Minority party	Third party
Leader	Margaret Thatcher	James Callaghan	David Steel
Party	Conservative	Labour	Liberal
Leader since	11 February 1975	5 April 1976	7 July 1976
Councillors	12,370	7,115	950
Councillors +/-	▲1,293	▼1,098	▼163
- Colours denote the winning party, as shown in the main table of results.

Local elections were held in the United Kingdom in May 1977. The results were a major mid-term setback for the Labour government, and the Conservatives, the main opposition, comprehensively regained control of the Greater London Council with 64 seats against Labour's 28. Elections were also held in the county councils and in Northern Ireland.

The Conservative Party gained 1,293 seats, bringing their number of councillors to 12,370. The Labour Party lost 1,098 seats, leaving them with 7,115 councillors. The Liberal Party lost 163 seats, leaving them with 950 councillors.

Changes were as follows:

- Conservative gain from no overall control - Bedfordshire, Cambridgeshire, Cumbria, Gloucestershire, Hampshire, Hertfordshire, Leicestershire, Lincolnshire, Norfolk, Warwickshire, Wiltshire, Worcestershire
- Conservative gain from Labour - Derbyshire, Northamptonshire, Nottinghamshire, Staffordshire
- Conservative gain from Independent - Isle of Wight

== England ==
=== Unicameral area ===
Council	Previous control	Result	Details
Greater London	Labour	Conservative gain	Details

=== Metropolitan county councils ===
Council	Previous control	Result	Details
Greater Manchester	Labour	Conservative gain	Details
Merseyside	Labour	Conservative gain	Details
South Yorkshire	Labour	Labour hold	Details
Tyne and Wear	Labour	Labour hold	Details
West Midlands	Labour	Conservative gain	Details
West Yorkshire	Labour	Conservative gain	Details

=== Non-metropolitan county councils ===
Council	Previous control	Result	Details
Avon	No overall control	Conservative gain	Details
Bedfordshire	No overall control	Conservative gain	Details
Berkshire	No overall control	Conservative gain	Details
Buckinghamshire	Conservative	Conservative hold	Details
Cambridgeshire	No overall control	Conservative gain	Details
Cheshire	No overall control	No overall control hold	Details
Cleveland	Labour	Conservative gain	Details
Cornwall	Independent	Independent hold	Details
Cumbria	No overall control	Conservative gain	Details
Derbyshire	Labour	Conservative gain	Details
Devon	Conservative	Conservative hold	Details
Dorset	Conservative	Conservative hold	Details
Durham	Labour	Labour hold	Details
East Sussex	Conservative	Conservative hold	Details
Essex	Conservative	Conservative hold	Details
Gloucestershire	No overall control	Conservative gain	Details
Hampshire	No overall control	Conservative gain	Details
Hereford and Worcester	No overall control	Conservative gain	Details
Hertfordshire	No overall control	Conservative gain	Details
Humberside	Labour	Conservative gain	Details
Isle of Wight	Independent	Conservative gain	Details
Kent	Conservative	Conservative hold	Details
Lancashire	Conservative	Conservative hold	Details
Leicestershire	No overall control	Conservative gain	Details
Lincolnshire	No overall control	Conservative gain	Details
Norfolk	Conservative	Conservative hold	Details
North Yorkshire	No overall control	Conservative gain	Details
Northamptonshire	Labour	Conservative gain	Details
Northumberland	No overall control	No overall control hold	Details
Nottinghamshire	Labour	Conservative gain	Details
Oxfordshire	Conservative	Conservative hold	Details
Salop	No overall control	No overall control hold	Details
Somerset	Conservative	Conservative hold	Details
Staffordshire	Labour	Conservative gain	Details
Suffolk	Conservative	Conservative hold	Details
Surrey	Conservative	Conservative hold	Details
Warwickshire	No overall control	Conservative gain	Details
West Sussex	Conservative	Conservative hold	Details
Wiltshire	No overall control	Conservative gain	Details

=== Sui generis ===
Council	Previous control	Result	Details
Isles of Scilly			Details

== Northern Ireland ==
Council	Previous control	Result	Details
Antrim	UUP	UUP	Details
Ards	UUP	No overall control	Details
Armagh	UUP	No overall control	Details
Ballymena	No overall control	DUP	Details
Ballymoney	No overall control	No overall control	Details
Banbridge	UUP	UUP	Details
Belfast	No overall control	No overall control	Details
Carrickfergus	No overall control	No overall control	Details
Castlereagh	No overall control	No overall control	Details
Coleraine	UUP	UUP	Details
Cookstown	No overall control	No overall control	Details
Craigavon	No overall control	No overall control	Details
Down	No overall control	No overall control	Details
Dungannon	UUP	No overall control	Details
Fermanagh	No overall control	No overall control	Details
Larne	Loyalist Coalition	No overall control	Details
Limavady	United Unionists	No overall control	Details
Lisburn	UUP	No overall control	Details
Londonderry	No overall control	No overall control	Details
Magherafelt	No overall control	No overall control	Details
Moyle	No overall control	No overall control	Details
Newry and Mourne	No overall control	No overall control	Details
Newtownabbey	No overall control	No overall control	Details
North Down	No overall control	No overall control	Details
Omagh	No overall control	No overall control	Details
Strabane	No overall control	No overall control	Details

== Scotland ==
=== District councils ===
Council	Previous control	Result	Details
Aberdeen	Labour	No overall control gain	Details
Angus	Conservative	Conservative hold	Details
Annandale and Eskdale	Independent	Independent hold	Details
Argyll	Independent	Independent hold	Details
Badenoch and Strathspey	Independent	Independent hold	Details
Banff and Buchan	Independent	Independent hold	Details
Bearsden and Milngavie	No overall control	Conservative gain	Details
Berwickshire	Conservative	Conservative hold	Details
Caithness	Independent	Independent hold	Details
Clackmannan	No overall control	SNP gain	Details
Clydebank	Labour	SNP gain	Details
Cumbernauld and Kilsyth	SNP	SNP hold	Details
Cumnock and Doon Valley	Labour	Labour hold	Details
Cunninghame	Labour	No overall control gain	Details
Dumbarton	Labour	No overall control gain	Details
Dundee	No overall control	No overall control hold	Details
Dunfermline	Labour	Labour hold	Details
East Kilbride	No overall control	SNP gain	Details
East Lothian	Labour	Labour hold	Details
Eastwood	Conservative	Conservative hold	Details
Edinburgh	No overall control	Conservative gain	Details
Ettrick and Lauderdale	Independent	Independent hold	Details
Falkirk	No overall control	SNP gain	Details
Glasgow	Labour	No overall control gain	Details
Gordon	Independent	Independent hold	Details
Hamilton	Labour	Labour hold	Details
Inverclyde	Labour	Liberal gain	Details
Inverness	Independent	Independent hold	Details
Kilmarnock and Loudoun	Labour	No overall control gain	Details
Kincardine and Deeside	Independent	Independent hold	Details
Kirkcaldy	Labour	No overall control gain	Details
Kyle and Carrick	Conservative	Conservative hold	Details
Lanark	Independent	No overall control gain	Details
Lochaber	Independent	Independent hold	Details
Midlothian	Labour	No overall control gain	Details
Monklands	Labour	Labour hold	Details
Moray	Independent	Independent hold	Details
Motherwell	Labour	Labour hold	Details
Nairn	Independent	Independent hold	Details
Nithsdale	Independent	Independent hold	Details
North East Fife	Conservative	Conservative hold	Details
Perth and Kinross	Conservative	Conservative hold	Details
Renfrew	Labour	No overall control gain	Details
Ross and Cromarty	Independent	Independent hold	Details
Roxburgh	Independent	Independent hold	Details
Skye and Lochalsh	Independent	Independent hold	Details
Stewartry	Independent	Independent hold	Details
Stirling	No overall control	No overall control hold	Details
Strathkelvin	No overall control	No overall control hold	Details
Sutherland	Independent	Independent hold	Details
Tweeddale	Independent	Independent hold	Details
West Lothian	No overall control	No overall control hold	Details
Wigtown	Independent	Independent hold	Details

== Wales ==
=== County councils ===
Council	Previous control	Result	Details
Clwyd	No overall control	No overall control hold	Details
Dyfed	Independent	Independent hold	Details
Gwent	Labour	No overall control gain	Details
Gwynedd	Independent	Independent hold	Details
Mid Glamorgan	Labour	Labour hold	Details
Powys	Independent	Independent hold	Details
South Glamorgan	Labour	Conservative gain	Details
West Glamorgan	Labour	Labour hold	Details
