= 1977 Falkirk District Council election =

1977 Scottish local government election

← 1974	3 May 1977	1980 →

All 36 seats to Falkirk District Council 19 seats needed for a majority
	First party	Second party
Party	SNP	Labour
Last election	11 seats, 35.6%	17 seats, 43.0%
Seats won	22	8
Seat change	▲11	▼9
Popular vote	21,111	13,870
Percentage	47.2%	31.0%
Swing	▲11.6%	▼12.0%
	Third party	Fourth party
Party	Independent	Conservative
Last election	7 seats, 14.9%	1 seat, 6.5%
Seats won	4	2
Seat change	▼3	▲1
Popular vote	6,287	2,801
Percentage	14.1%	6.3%
Swing	▼0.8%	▼0.2%

Elections to Falkirk District Council took place on 3 May 1977, alongside elections to the councils of Scotland's 53 other districts. There were 36 wards, which each elected a single member using the first-past-the-post voting system.

== Results ==
1977 Falkirk District Council election result
Party	Seats	Gains	Losses	Net gain/loss	Seats %	Votes %	Votes	+/−
SNP	22			▲11	61.1	47.2	21,111	▲11.6
Labour	8			▼9	22.2	31.0	13,870	▼12.0
Independent	4			▼3	11.1	14.1	6,287	▼0.8
Conservative	2			▲1	5.6	6.3	2,801	▼0.2
SLP	0			Steady	0.0	0.8	362	New
Liberal	0			Steady	0.0	0.7	295	New
