= 1977 Roxburgh District Council election =

1977 Scottish local government election

- 3 May 1977

All 16 seats to Roxburgh District Council 9 seats needed for a majority
	First party	Second party
Party	Independent	Liberal
Last election	16 seats, 100.0%	Did not contest
Seats won	12	2
Seat change	▼4	▲2
Popular vote	2,816	393
Percentage	63.3%	8.8%
Swing	▼36.7%	New
	Third party	Fourth party
Party	Conservative	Labour
Last election	Did not contest	Did not contest
Seats won	1	1
Seat change	▲1	▲1
Popular vote	681	561
Percentage	15.3%	12.6%
Swing	New	New
- Composition of District Council after the election

Elections to Roxburgh District Council took place on 3 May 1977, alongside elections to the councils of Scotland's 53 other districts. There were 16 wards, which each elected a single member using the first-past-the-post voting system.

== Results ==
1977 Roxburgh District Council election result
Party	Seats	Gains	Losses	Net gain/loss	Seats %	Votes %	Votes	+/−
Independent	12	0	4	▼4	75.0	63.3	2,816	▼36.7
Liberal	2	2	0	▲2	12.5	8.8	393	New
Conservative	1	1	0	▲1	6.3	15.3	681	New
Labour	1	1	0	▲1	6.3	12.6	561	New
