= 1977 Berwickshire District Council election =

1977 Scottish local government election

← 1974	3 May 1977	1980 →

All 12 seats to Berwickshire District Council 7 seats needed for a majority
	First party	Second party
Party	Conservative	Independent
Last election	8 seats, 30.4%	4 seats, 62.1%
Seats won	11	1
Seat change	▲3	▼3
Popular vote	1,952	510
Percentage	67.1%	17.5%
Swing	▲36.7%	▼44.6%

The 1977 Berwickshire District Council election took place on 3 May 1977, alongside elections to the councils of Scotland's 53 other districts.

== Results ==
1977 Berwickshire District Council election result
Party	Seats	Gains	Losses	Net gain/loss	Seats %	Votes %	Votes	+/−
Conservative	11			▲3	91.7	67.1	1,952	▲36.7
Independent	1			▼3	8.3	17.5	510	▼44.6
Labour	0	0	0	Steady	0.0	6.4	186	▼1.1
Liberal	0	0	0	Steady	0.0	5.4	157	New
SNP	0	0	0	Steady	0.0	3.5	103	New
