= 1977 Renfrew District Council election =

1977 Scottish local government election

- 3 May 1977

All 40 seats to Renfrew District Council 21 seats needed for a majority
	First party	Second party	Third party
Party	Labour	Conservative	SNP
Last election	25 seats, 49.3%	10 seats, 32.2%	1 seat, 5.0%
Seats won	14	11	11
Seat change	▼11	▲1	▲10
Popular vote	23,306	19,944	17,725
Percentage	35.0%	29.9%	26.6%
Swing	▼14.3%	▼2.3%	▲21.6%
	Fourth party	Fifth party
Party	Independent	Independent Labour
Last election	3 seats, 9.8%	Did not contest
Seats won	3	1
Seat change	Steady	▲1
Popular vote	3,707	626
Percentage	5.6%	0.9%
Swing	▼4.2%	New

Elections to Renfrew District Council were held on 3 May 1977, on the same day as the other Scottish local government elections. This was the second election to the district council following the implementation of the Local Government (Scotland) Act 1973.

The election used the 40 wards created by the Formation Electoral Arrangements in 1974. Each ward elected one councillor using first-past-the-post voting.

Labour lost overall control of the council. The party lost 11 of the 25 seats they had won in 1974.

== Results ==
1977 Renfrew District Council election result
Party	Seats	Gains	Losses	Net gain/loss	Seats %	Votes %	Votes	+/−
Labour	14			▼11	35.0	35.0	23,306	▼14.3
Conservative	11			▲1	27.5	29.9	19,944	▼2.3
SNP	11			▲10	27.5	26.6	17,725	▲21.6
Independent	3			Steady	7.5	5.6	3,707	▼4.2
Independent Labour	1			▲1	2.5	0.9	626	New
SLP	0			Steady	0.0	1.7	1,138	New
Communist	0			Steady	0.0	0.3	193	▼0.1
