= 1977 West Lothian District Council election =

1977 Scottish local government election

- 3 May 1977

All 21 seats to West Lothian District Council 11 seats needed for a majority
	First party	Second party
Party	SNP	Labour
Last election	6 seats, 40.5%	12 seats, 41.4%
Seats won	9	9
Seat change	▲3	▼3
Popular vote	19,874	16,176
Percentage	47.0%	38.2%
Swing	▲6.5%	▼3.2%
	Third party	Fourth party
Party	Independent	Ratepayers
Last election	2 seats, 7.5%	1 seat, 5.4%
Seats won	2	1
Seat change	Steady	Steady
Popular vote	2,782	1,923
Percentage	6.6%	4.5%
Swing	▼0.9%	▼0.9%
- Council composition following the election

Elections to West Lothian District Council were held on 3 May 1977, on the same day as the other Scottish local government elections. This was the second election to the district council following the implementation of the Local Government (Scotland) Act 1973.

The election used the 21 wards created by the Formation Electoral Arrangements in 1974. Each ward elected one councillor using first-past-the-post voting.

== Results ==
1977 West Lothian District Council election result
Party	Seats	Gains	Losses	Net gain/loss	Seats %	Votes %	Votes	+/−
SNP	9	4	1	▲3	42.9	47.0	19,874	▲6.5
Labour	9	1	4	▼3	42.9	38.2	16,176	▼3.2
Independent	2	0	0	Steady	9.5	6.6	2,782	▼0.9
Ratepayers	1	0	0	Steady	4.8	4.5	1,923	▼0.9
Liberal	0	0	0	Steady	0.0	1.7	705	▲0.8
Communist	0	0	0	Steady	0.0	1.3	583	▼0.1
Conservative	0	0	0	Steady	0.0	0.7	286	New
