= 1977 Suffolk County Council election =

1977 UK local government election

- 5 May 1977

All 82 seats to Suffolk County Council 42 seats needed for a majority

	First party	Second party
Party	Conservative	Labour
Seats won	70	9
Seat change	▲23	▼20
Popular vote	101,692	51,712
Percentage	62.0%	31.6%
Swing	▲13.5%	▼11.9%
	Third party	Fourth party
Party	Independent	Liberal
Seats won	2	1
Seat change	▼1	▼2
Popular vote	7,039	2,282
Percentage	4.3%	1.4%
Swing	▲1.2%	▼2.8%
Council control before election
Conservative
Council control after election
Conservative

The 1977 Suffolk County Council election took place on 5 May 1977 to elect members of Suffolk County Council in Suffolk, England. It was held on the same day as other local elections.

== Summary ==
=== Election result ===
1977 Suffolk County Council election
Party	Candidates	Seats	Gains	Losses	Net gain/loss	Seats %	Votes %	Votes	+/−
Conservative	70	70			▲23	85.4	62.0	101,692	+13.5
Labour	70	9			▼20	11.0	31.6	51,712	–11.9
Independent	9	2			▼1	2.4	4.3	7,039	+1.2
Liberal	8	1			▼2	1.2	1.4	2,282	–2.8
Ind. Conservative	1	0			Steady	0.0	0.6	971	–0.2
National Front	2	0			Steady	0.0	0.1	193	N/A
