= 1977 Dorset County Council election =

1977 UK local government election

- 5 May 1977

All 91 seats of Dorset County Council 67 seats needed for a majority
	First party	Second party	Third party
Party	Conservative	Independent	Labour
Seats before	60	7	13
Seats won	79	4	4
Seat change	▲19	▼3	▼9
- The County of Dorset within England
Council control before election
Conservative
Council control after election
Conservative

1977 Dorset County Council election took place on Thursday, 5 May 1977, alongside other local elections across the United Kingdom. All 91 seats of Dorset County Council were up for election.

The result was that the Conservatives comfortably retained majority control, winning seventy-nine seats, a gain of 19, of which nine were from Labour and seven from the Liberals. Labour, the Liberals, and the Independents ended with only four county councillors each.

== Results ==
Result of Dorset County Council election, 1977
Party	Seats	Gains	Losses	Net gain/loss	Seats %	Votes %	Votes	+/−
Conservative	79	19	0	+19	86.8			
Independent	4	0	3	–3	4.4			
Labour	4	0	9	–9	4.4			
Liberal	4	0	7	–7	4.4			

== Election result by division ==
=== Bournemouth (25 seats) ===
Bournemouth (Boscombe East)
Party	Candidate	Votes	%	±%
Conservative	M Green	1,187	85.0	
Labour	E Hourihane	210	15.0	
Turnout		1,397	29.6	
Conservative hold		Swing		

Bournemouth (Boscombe West)
Party	Candidate	Votes	%	±%
Conservative	R Wotton	1,390	68.3	
Ind. Conservative	H Mears	483	23.7	
Labour	I Evison	162	8.0	
Turnout		2,035	31.5	
Conservative hold		Swing		

Bournemouth (Central)
Party	Candidate	Votes	%	±%
Conservative	J Williams	1,214	77.2	
Liberal	J Stone	227	14.4	
Labour	J Reidy	131	8.3	
Turnout		1,572	27.4	
Conservative hold		Swing		

Bournemouth (East Cliff)
Party	Candidate	Votes	%	±%
Conservative	J Curtis	1,575	87.7	
Labour	N Howard	220	12.3	
Turnout		1,795	30.1	
Conservative hold		Swing		

Bournemouth (Kings Park) (2 seats)
Party	Candidate	Votes	%	±%
Conservative	E Hollies-Smith	1,748		
Conservative	D Jenkinson	1,616		
Liberal	R Beale	498		
Liberal	B Leake	405		
Labour	N Copage	311		
Turnout			38.2	
Conservative hold		Swing		
Conservative gain from Independent Liberal		Swing		

Bournemouth (Kinson North) (2 seats)
Party	Candidate	Votes	%	±%
Conservative	L Cade	1,852		
Conservative	L Cox	1,609		
Residents	R Haskell	1,467		
Labour	R Bennett	1,129		
Labour	L Bennett	1,124		
Liberal	D Cobb	619		
Turnout			42.4	
Conservative gain from Labour		Swing		
Conservative gain from Labour		Swing		

Bournemouth (Kinson South) (2 seats)
Party	Candidate	Votes	%	±%
Conservative	K Baily	2,188		
Conservative	G Graham	1,878		
Labour	G Spicer	1,551		
Labour	P Brushett	1,377		
Turnout			35.7	
Conservative gain from Labour		Swing		
Conservative gain from Labour		Swing		

Bournemouth (Moordown North) (2 seats)
Party	Candidate	Votes	%	±%
Independent	R Whittaker	2,539		
Conservative	S McQueen	2,122		
Labour	A Tankard	656		
Turnout			46.2	
Independent gain from Labour		Swing		
Conservative hold		Swing		

Bournemouth (Moordown South)
Party	Candidate	Votes	%	±%
Conservative	W Sayers	753	46.9	
Liberal	P Bamborough	643	40.0	
Labour	N Pankhurst	211	13.1	
Turnout		1,607	36.9	
Conservative gain from Liberal		Swing		

Bournemouth (Queens Park) (2 seats)
Party	Candidate	Votes	%	±%
Conservative	P Hogarth	2,032		
Conservative	G Knops	1,438		
Residents	C Dyer	1,270		
Residents	G Griffiths	683		
Labour	H Cutler	405		
Turnout			33.3	
Conservative hold		Swing		
Conservative hold		Swing		

Bournemouth (Redhill Park) (2 seats)
Party	Candidate	Votes	%	±%
Ind. Conservative	P Whitelegg	2,031		
Conservative	G Masters	1,762		
Conservative	B Wallace-Smith	704		
Labour	W Bishop	240		
Labour	V Williams	212		
Turnout			38.9	
Ind. Conservative hold		Swing		
Conservative hold		Swing		

Bournemouth (Southbourne) (2 seats)
Party	Candidate	Votes	%	±%
Conservative	E Day	1,971		
Conservative	B Beckett	1,954		
Ind. Conservative	E Ruston	1,778		
Labour	D Dykes	390		
Turnout			35.3	
Conservative hold		Swing		
Conservative hold		Swing		

Bournemouth (West Cliff) (2 seats)
Party	Candidate	Votes	%	±%
Conservative	R Judd	1,656		
Conservative	S Dunscombe	1,633		
Residents	H Nettleton-Walker	256		
Labour	A Shead	250		
Turnout			30.2	
Conservative hold		Swing		
Conservative hold		Swing		

Bournemouth (West Southbourne)
Party	Candidate	Votes	%	±%
Conservative	D Scott	1,415	63.7	
Liberal	D Eyre	637	28.7	
Labour	W Gaskin	170	7.7	
Turnout		2,222	36.8	
Conservative hold		Swing		

Bournemouth (Westbourne) (2 seats)
Party	Candidate	Votes	%	±%
Conservative	B Bicknell	3,093		
Conservative	L Pardy	2,891		
Labour	R Woodley	274		
Turnout			37.3	
Conservative hold		Swing		
Conservative hold		Swing		

Bournemouth (Winton)
Party	Candidate	Votes	%	±%
Conservative	P Haley	1,180	57.2	
Labour	B Grower	882	42.8	
Turnout		2,062	40.7	
Conservative gain from Liberal		Swing		

=== Christchurch (6 seats) ===
Christchurch No. 1 (Central)
Party	Candidate	Votes	%	±%
Conservative	J Richardson	1,041	61.3	
Labour	T Staniforth	656	38.7	
Turnout		1,697	41.7	
Conservative hold		Swing		

Christchurch No. 2 (Highcliffe East)
Party	Candidate	Votes	%	±%
Conservative	J Beattie	unopposed		
Conservative hold		Swing		

Christchurch No. 3 (Highcliffe West)
Party	Candidate	Votes	%	±%
Conservative	M Williams	unopposed		
Conservative hold		Swing		

Christchurch No. 4 (Mudeford)
Party	Candidate	Votes	%	±%
Conservative	W Freestone	unopposed		
Conservative hold		Swing		

Christchurch No. 5
Party	Candidate	Votes	%	±%
Conservative	D Fox	1,850	83.3	
Labour	H Blake	372	16.7	
Turnout		2,222	30.7	
Conservative hold		Swing		

Christchurch No. 6
Party	Candidate	Votes	%	±%
Conservative	A Green	1,553	56.3	
Labour	R Holloway	799	29.0	
Liberal	B Toms	405	14.7	
Turnout		2,757	44.6	
Conservative gain from Labour		Swing		

=== East Dorset (9 seats) ===
Ringwood and Fordingbridge
Party	Candidate	Votes	%	±%
Conservative	J Slater	unopposed		
Conservative hold		Swing		

Wimborne and Cranborne No. 1
Party	Candidate	Votes	%	±%
Conservative	P Hargreaves	1,192	55.7	
Residents	J Williams	665	31.1	
Liberal	P Smith	283	13.2	
Turnout		2,140	36.2	
Conservative hold		Swing		

Wimborne and Cranborne No. 2
Party	Candidate	Votes	%	±%
Conservative	W Iremonger	2,773	74.5	
Liberal	M Herridge	949	25.5	
Turnout		3,722	38.4	
Conservative hold		Swing		

Wimborne and Cranborne No. 3
Party	Candidate	Votes	%	±%
Conservative	A Morgan	1,065	52.2	
Residents	G Hibbs	828	40.1	
Liberal	F Goater	149	7.3	
Turnout		2,042	42.2	
Conservative hold		Swing		

Wimborne and Cranborne No. 4
Party	Candidate	Votes	%	±%
Conservative	J Guarella	1,489	68.6	
Liberal	F Beal	682	31.4	
Turnout		2,171	35.4	
Conservative gain from Independent		Swing		

Wimborne and Cranborne No. 5
Party	Candidate	Votes	%	±%
Liberal	J Bingham	unopposed		
Liberal hold		Swing		

Wimborne and Cranborne No. 6
Party	Candidate	Votes	%	±%
Conservative	M Wicken	unopposed		
Conservative hold		Swing		

Wimborne and Cranborne No. 7
Party	Candidate	Votes	%	±%
Conservative	W Wells	1,236	63.5	
Liberal	D Bussey	710	36.5	
Turnout		1,946	47.4	
Conservative gain from Liberal		Swing		

Wimborne Minster
Party	Candidate	Votes	%	±%
Conservative	W Tapper	unopposed		
Conservative hold		Swing		

=== North Dorset (7 seats) ===
Blandford
Party	Candidate	Votes	%	±%
Conservative	D Trench	1,298	81.2	
Labour	P Cheater	300	18.8	
Turnout		1,598	33.3	
Conservative hold		Swing		

Blandford Rural No. 1
Party	Candidate	Votes	%	±%
Conservative	C Mitchell	unopposed		
Conservative hold		Swing		

Blandford Rural No. 2
Party	Candidate	Votes	%	±%
Conservative	D Jones	unopposed		
Conservative hold		Swing		

Shaftesbury
Party	Candidate	Votes	%	±%
Conservative	D Newman	1,892	60.2	
Liberal	K Waights	1,252	39.8	
Turnout		3,144	52.6	
Conservative gain from Liberal		Swing		

Shaftesbury Rural
Party	Candidate	Votes	%	±%
Conservative	N Scott	2,197	73.1	
Liberal	V Cane	809	26.9	
Turnout		3,006	49.0	
Conservative hold		Swing		

Sturminster Rural No. 1
Party	Candidate	Votes	%	±%
Conservative	J Rose	unopposed		
Conservative hold		Swing		

Sturminster Rural No. 2
Party	Candidate	Votes	%	±%
Conservative	R Rose	unopposed		
Conservative hold		Swing		

=== Poole (17 seats) ===
Poole No. 1
Party	Candidate	Votes	%	±%
Liberal	E Weeks	1,034	39.0	
Conservative	J Gardner	983	37.0	
Labour	H Rosser	637	24.0	
Turnout		2,654	36.2	
Liberal hold		Swing		

Poole No. 2 (East)
Party	Candidate	Votes	%	±%
Conservative	I Duncan	1,620	59.4	
Liberal	R Feltham	642	23.6	
Labour	M Knight	464	17.0	
Turnout		2,726	42.0	
Conservative hold		Swing		

Poole No. 2 (West)
Party	Candidate	Votes	%	±%
Conservative	E Webster	1,454	66.2	
Labour	G Partington	376	17.1	
Liberal	B Clements	366	16.7	
Turnout		2,196	41.1	
Conservative hold		Swing		

Poole No. 3 (North)
Party	Candidate	Votes	%	±%
Conservative	J Bradley	711	51.3	
Ind. Socialist	M Pauley	332	24.0	
Labour	D Coleman	191	13.8	
Liberal	J Allen	152	11.0	
Turnout		1,386	35.3	
Conservative gain from Labour		Swing		

Poole No. 3 (South)
Party	Candidate	Votes	%	±%
Conservative	K McIntyre	925	68.6	
Labour	R Ledwith	297	22.0	
Liberal	J Brown	126	9.3	
Turnout		1,348	40.6	
Conservative hold		Swing		

Poole No. 4 (North)
Party	Candidate	Votes	%	±%
Conservative	A Watts	1,145	63.1	
Liberal	W Rigler	670	36.9	
Turnout		1,815	46.1	
Conservative gain from Liberal		Swing		

Poole No. 4 (South)
Party	Candidate	Votes	%	±%
Conservative	V Braham	1,199	70.0	
Residents	D Ward	418	24.4	
Liberal	P Rowland	95	5.5	
Turnout		1,712	36.1	
Conservative hold		Swing		

Poole No. 5 (North)
Party	Candidate	Votes	%	±%
Conservative	J Peters	960	69.6	
Liberal	M Churchill	419	30.4	
Turnout		1,379	36.3	
Conservative hold		Swing		

Poole No. 5 (South)
Party	Candidate	Votes	%	±%
Conservative	B McIntyre	1,690	91.6	
Liberal	A Giles	154	8.4	
Turnout		1,844	51.9	
Conservative hold		Swing		

Poole No. 6
Party	Candidate	Votes	%	±%
Conservative	J Bisgood	2,511	96.3	
Liberal	F Kara	96	3.7	
Turnout		2,607	43.1	
Conservative hold		Swing		

Poole No. 7
Party	Candidate	Votes	%	±%
Conservative	F Rowe	1,684	63.8	
Liberal	G Goode	957	36.2	
Turnout		2,641	38.9	
Conservative gain from Liberal		Swing		

Poole No. 8 (North)
Party	Candidate	Votes	%	±%
Liberal	R Buyers	641	57.0	
Labour	J Payne	483	43.0	
Turnout		1,124	31.2	
Liberal gain from Labour		Swing		

Poole No. 8 (South)
Party	Candidate	Votes	%	±%
Liberal	H Ballam	unopposed		
Liberal hold		Swing		

Poole No. 9 (North)
Party	Candidate	Votes	%	±%
Labour	S Hodge	385	37.5	
Independent	J Dyke	374	36.4	
Liberal	S Beauchamp	269	26.2	
Turnout		1,028	25.4	
Labour hold		Swing		

Poole No. 9 (South)
Party	Candidate	Votes	%	±%
Labour	D Gooding	546	61.1	
Liberal	C Vincent	348	38.9	
Turnout		894	24.6	
Labour hold		Swing		

Poole No. 10 (North)
Party	Candidate	Votes	%	±%
Conservative	E Adams	2,849	79.1	
Liberal	D James	754	20.9	
Turnout		3,603	48.8	
Conservative hold		Swing		

Poole No. 10 (South)
Party	Candidate	Votes	%	±%
Conservative	R Hann	1,490	73.3	
Liberal	A Foster	542	26.7	
Turnout		2,032	34.3	
Conservative hold		Swing		

=== Purbeck (6 seats) ===
Swanage
Party	Candidate	Votes	%	±%
Conservative	R Montague-Jones	unopposed		
Conservative hold		Swing		

Wareham
Party	Candidate	Votes	%	±%
Conservative	C Hodge	unopposed		
Conservative gain from Independent		Swing		

Wareham and Purbeck No. 1
Party	Candidate	Votes	%	±%
Conservative	K Ferguson	unopposed		
Conservative hold		Swing		

Wareham and Purbeck No. 2
Party	Candidate	Votes	%	±%
Conservative	D Franklin	1,620	78.6	
Labour	S Shinn	440	21.4	
Turnout		2,060	44.8	
Conservative gain from Independent		Swing		

Wareham and Purbeck No. 3
Party	Candidate	Votes	%	±%
Conservative	C Perkins	1,340	78.3	
Liberal	M Dawson	372	21.7	
Turnout		1,712	38.1	
Conservative hold		Swing		

Wareham and Purbeck No. 4
Party	Candidate	Votes	%	±%
Conservative	M Bond	1,688	69.6	
Labour	W Bartlett	738	30.4	
Turnout		2,426	46.2	
Conservative gain from Independent		Swing		

=== West Dorset (12 seats) ===
Beaminster Rural No. 1
Party	Candidate	Votes	%	±%
Conservative	G Best	unopposed		
Conservative hold		Swing		

Beaminster Rural No. 2
Party	Candidate	Votes	%	±%
Conservative	R Earle	1,393	67.1	
Independent	K Macksey	682	32.9	
Turnout		2,075	43.7	
Conservative hold		Swing		

Bridport
Party	Candidate	Votes	%	±%
Conservative	J Stickland	1,057	57.7	
Independent	J Booker	776	42.3	
Turnout		1,833	36.0	
Conservative hold		Swing		

Bridport Rural
Party	Candidate	Votes	%	±%
Conservative	J Mallinson	2,383	87.7	
Labour	J McKenzie	333	12.3	
Turnout		2,716	46.0	
Conservative hold		Swing		

Dorchester No. 1 (West)
Party	Candidate	Votes	%	±%
Conservative	C Lucas	1,200	54.6	
Liberal	R Brissenden	526	23.9	
Labour	R Wakely	473	21.5	
Turnout		2,199	41.9	
Conservative gain from Labour		Swing		

Dorchester No. 2
Party	Candidate	Votes	%	±%
Conservative	P Seaton	1,476	63.5	
Liberal	D Smith	593	23.5	
Labour	G Standfield	254	10.9	
Turnout		2,323	44.8	
Conservative gain from Liberal		Swing		

Dorchester Rural No. 1
Party	Candidate	Votes	%	±%
Conservative	H Bond	unopposed		
Conservative hold		Swing		

Dorchester Rural No. 2
Party	Candidate	Votes	%	±%
Conservative	Lord Digby	1,641	75.4	
Labour	P Gregory	536	24.6	
Turnout		2,177	49.5	
Conservative hold		Swing		

Dorchester Rural No. 3
Party	Candidate	Votes	%	±%
Conservative	P Meaden	unopposed		
Conservative hold		Swing		

Lyme Regis
Party	Candidate	Votes	%	±%
Conservative	J Nuttall	unopposed		
Conservative hold		Swing		

Sherborne
Party	Candidate	Votes	%	±%
Conservative	G Buchanan	1,620	48.5	
Liberal	P Winch	1,051	31.4	
Labour	E Noake	671	20.1	
Turnout		3,342	59.0	
Conservative gain from Liberal		Swing		

Sherborne Rural
Party	Candidate	Votes	%	±%
Conservative	H Chapman	unopposed		
Conservative hold		Swing		

=== Weymouth and Portland (9 seats) ===
Portland (2 seats)
Party	Candidate	Votes	%	±%
Independent	J Morris	1,401		
Conservative	E Wright	1,287		
Residents	J Neimer	1,075		
Conservative	W Perry	696		
Labour	F Morris	470		
Labour	J Bishop	404		
Turnout			36.7	
Independent hold		Swing		
Conservative hold		Swing		

Weymouth No. 1
Party	Candidate	Votes	%	±%
Conservative	R Russell	1,172	70.6	
Labour	C Cousins	488	29.4	
Turnout		1,660	40.9	
Conservative hold		Swing		

Weymouth No. 2
Party	Candidate	Votes	%	±%
Conservative	L Hill	1,069	74.2	
Labour	P Rendall	372	25.8	
Turnout		1,441	33.1	
Conservative hold		Swing		

Weymouth No. 3
Party	Candidate	Votes	%	±%
Conservative	A Biles	1,721	80.5	
Labour	R Clayton	417	19.5	
Turnout		2,138	40.2	
Conservative hold		Swing		

Weymouth No. 4
Party	Candidate	Votes	%	±%
Conservative	J O'Brien	1,879	85.9	
Labour	V McCarthy	309	14.1	
Turnout		2,188	37.3	
Conservative hold		Swing		

Weymouth No. 5
Party	Candidate	Votes	%	±%
Labour	P Jevons	unopposed		
Labour hold		Swing		

Weymouth No. 6
Party	Candidate	Votes	%	±%
Conservative	A Griffin	1,145	57.7	
Labour	M Jewkes	839	42.3	
Turnout		1,984	46.1	
Conservative gain from Labour		Swing		

Weymouth No. 7
Party	Candidate	Votes	%	±%
Labour	R Gainey	unopposed		
Labour hold		Swing		
