= 1977 Norfolk County Council election =

1977 English local election

- 5 May 1977

All 84 seats to Norfolk County Council 43 seats needed for a majority

	First party	Second party
Party	Conservative	Labour
Seats won	70	13
Seat change	▲19	▼14
Popular vote	123,166	57,949
Percentage	64.5%	30.3%
Swing	▲16.0%	▼13.1%
	Third party	Fourth party
Party	Independent	Ind. Conservative
Seats won	0	0
Seat change	▼4	▼1
Popular vote	2,326	574
Percentage	1.2%	0.3%
Swing	▼2.2%	▼0.6%
Council control before election
Conservative
Council control after election
Conservative

The 1977 Norfolk County Council election took place on 5 May 1977 to elect members of Norfolk County Council in Norfolk, England. This was on the same day as other local elections.

== Summary ==
=== Election result ===
1977 Norfolk County Council election
Party	Candidates	Seats	Gains	Losses	Net gain/loss	Seats %	Votes %	Votes	+/−
Conservative	75	70	19	0	▲19	84.3	64.5	123,166	+16.0
Labour	71	13	0	14	▼14	15.7	30.3	57,949	–13.1
Liberal	17	0	0	0	Steady	0.0	3.2	6,086	–0.4
Independent	5	0	0	4	▼4	0.0	1.2	2,326	–2.2
Residents	1	0	0	0	Steady	0.0	0.3	616	N/A
Ind. Conservative	1	0	0	0	▼1	0.0	0.3	574	–0.6
National Front	3	0	0	0	Steady	0.0	0.2	290	+0.1
