= 1974 Berwickshire District Council election =

1974 Scottish local government election

7 May 1974	1977 →

All 12 seats to Berwickshire District Council 7 seats needed for a majority
	First party	Second party
Party	Conservative	Independent
Seats won	8	4
Popular vote	925	1,889
Percentage	30.4%	62.1%

Elections to Berwickshire District Council were held on 7 May 1974, on the same day as the other Scottish local government elections. This was the first election to the district council following the implementation of the Local Government (Scotland) Act 1973.

The election used the 12 wards created by the Formation Electoral Arrangements in 1974. Each ward elected one councillor using first-past-the-post voting.

The Conservatives took control of the council after winning a majority. The party took eight of the 12 seats and 30% of the popular vote. Independent candidates won the remaining four seats.

== Background ==
Prior to 1974, Berwickshire County Council had been responsible for most functions of local government in the area. Within that were the burghs of Coldstream, Duns, Eyemouth and Lauder. These were all small burghs so the burgh council had limited powers which included some control over planning as well as local taxation, building control, housing, lighting and drainage with the rest of the local government responsibility falling to the county council.

Following the recommendations in the Wheatly Report, the old system of counties and burghs – which had resulted in a mishmash of local government areas in which some small burghs had larger populations but far fewer responsibilities than some large burghs and even counties – was to be replaced by a new system of regional and district councils. The Local Government (Scotland) Act 1973 implemented most of the recommendations in the Wheatly Report. The majority of the historic county – excluding an area around Lauder – was placed into the Berwickshire district within the Borders region.

== Results ==
1974 Berwickshire District Council election result
Party	Seats	Gains	Losses	Net gain/loss	Seats %	Votes %	Votes	+/−
Conservative	8				66.7	30.4	925	N/A
Independent	4				33.3	62.1	1,889	N/A
Labour	0				0.0	7.5	227	N/A

== Aftermath ==
Berwickshire was the only partisan district in the newly created Borders region. The Conservatives took control of the council after taking eight of the 12 seats. Independent candidates won the remaining seats. Independents took control of the regional council which held its first election on the same day. Across Scotland, Labour won the most votes, the most seats and the most councils of any party.
