= 1977 North East Fife District Council election =

1977 Scottish local government election

Elections to North East Fife District Council were held in May 1977, the same day as the other Scottish local government elections.

Turnout in contested wards was 48.7%.

== Election results ==
North East Fife District Council Election Result 1977
| Party | Seats | Gains | Losses | Net gain/loss | Seats % | Votes % | Votes | +/− |
|---|---|---|---|---|---|---|---|---|
| Conservative | 14 | | | ▲1 | | 58.8 | 9,130 | ▲5.7 |
| Independent | 3 | | | ▼2 | | 19.6 | 3,050 | ▼11.7 |
| Liberal | 1 | | | ▲1 | | 11.0 | 1,706 | ▼0.8 |
| Labour | 0 | 0 | 0 | 0 | 0.0 | 6.9 | 1,078 | ▲3.1 |
| SNP | 0 | 0 | 0 | 0 | 0.0 | 3.7 | 573 | New |
