= 1977 East Lothian District Council election =

1977 Scottish local government election

Elections for East Lothian Council took place in May 1977, alongside elections to the councils of Scotland's various other districts.

== Ward results ==
=== Labour ===
- Musselburgh 1
- Musselburgh 2
- Musselburgh 3
- Tranent
- Ormiston
- Inveresk
- Prestonpans
- Preston
- Gladsmuir

=== Conservative ===
- Musselburgh 4
- Cockenzie
- Haddington
- Lammermuir
- Dirleton
- Dunbar
- East Linton
- North Berwick
