= 1974 Falkirk District Council election =

Falkirk District Council election

7 May 1974	1977 →

All 36 seats to Falkirk District Council 19 seats needed for a majority
	First party	Second party
Party	Labour	SNP
Seats won	17	11
Popular vote	21,486	17,763
Percentage	43.0%	35.6%
	Third party	Fourth party
Party	Independent	Conservative
Seats won	7	1
Popular vote	7,459	3,244
Percentage	14.9%	6.5%

Elections to Falkirk District Council were held on 7 May 1974, on the same day as the other Scottish local government elections. This was the first election to the district council following the implementation of the Local Government (Scotland) Act 1973.

The election used the 36 wards created by the Formation Electoral Arrangements in 1974. Each ward elected one councillor using first-past-the-post voting.

The council was left with no overall control following the election. Labour was the largest party after they won 17 of the 36 seats. The Scottish National Party (SNP) were the second-largest party after they took 11 seats while seven independent candidates were elected.

== Background ==
Prior to 1974, the area that was to become Falkirk, was split between two counties – the County of Stirling and West Lothian. Within that were three of the six burghs of the County of Stirling and one of the six burghs of West Lothian. The three small burghs (Bo'ness; Denny and Dunipace; and Grangemouth) had limited powers which included some control over planning as well as local taxation, building control, housing, lighting and drainage. The large burgh of Falkirk had further powers over the police, public health, social services, registration of births, marriages and deaths and electoral registration. The rest of the local government responsibility fell to the county council which had full control over the areas which were not within a burgh.

Following the recommendations in the Wheatly Report, the old system of counties and burghs – which had resulted in a mishmash of local government areas in which some small burghs had larger populations but far fewer responsibilities than some large burghs and even counties – was to be replaced by a new system of regional and district councils. The Local Government (Scotland) Act 1973 implemented most of the recommendations in the Wheatly Report. The eastern part of the County of Stirling which included the three burghs was combined with the northern part of West Lothian including the burgh of Grangemouth and was placed into the Falkirk district within the Central region.

== Results ==
1974 Falkirk District Council election result
Party	Seats	Gains	Losses	Net gain/loss	Seats %	Votes %	Votes	+/−
Labour	17			N/A	47.2	43.0	21,486	N/A
SNP	11			N/A	30.6	35.6	17,763	N/A
Independent	7			N/A	19.4	14.9	7,459	N/A
Conservative	1			N/A	2.8	6.5	3,244	N/A

== Aftermath ==
Falkirk, like the other two districts in the newly created Central region, was left in no overall control. Labour were the largest party after winning 17 seats and the Scottish National Party (SNP) were the second-largest after they took 11 seats. Seven independent candidates were elected and the Conservatives won one seat. Labour won control of the regional council which held its first election on the same day. Across Scotland, Labour won the most votes, the most seats and the most councils of any party.
