= 1977 Greater Manchester County Council election =

1973 UK local government election

- 5 May 1977

All 106 seats to Greater Manchester County Council 54 seats needed for a majority

	First party	Second party
Leader	Arnold Fieldhouse	Robert Thomas
Party	Conservative	Labour
Leader's seat	Manchester No.12	Manchester No.8 (stood down)
Last election	24 seats, 45.0%	69 seats, 38.5%
Seats before	29	64
Seats won	82	23
Seat change	▲53	▼41
Popular vote	318,580	273,024
Percentage	45.0%	38.5%
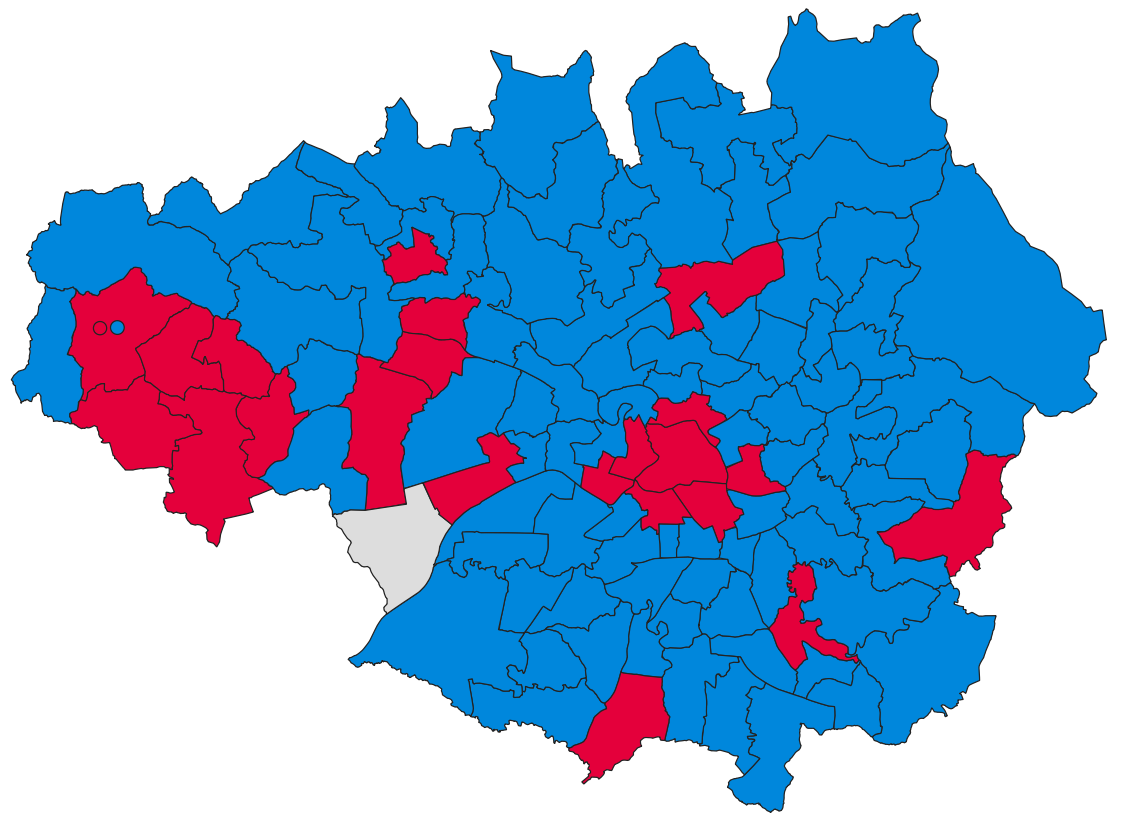
- Winner of each seat at the 1977 Greater Manchester County Council election
Leader before election
Robert Thomas
Labour
Leader after election
Arnold Fieldhouse
Conservative

Local elections to Greater Manchester County Council, a Metropolitan County Council encompassing Greater Manchester, were held on 5 May 1977. The whole council was up for election, with each successful candidate to serve a four-year term of office, expiring in 1981. The Conservative Party gained overall control of the council from the Labour Party.

== Election result ==
=== Overall result ===
Party	Votes	Seats	
Labour Party	318,580 (45.0%)	69 (65.1%)	69 / 106
Conservative Party	273,024 (38.5%)	24 (22.6%)	24 / 106
Liberal Party	108,309 (15.3%)	13 (12.3%)	13 / 106
Communist Party	4,286 (0.6%)	0 (0.0%)	0 / 106
Anti-Immigration	2,327 (0.3%)	0 (0.0%)	0 / 106
Independent	1,424 (0.2%)	0 (0.0%)	0 / 106
Independent Socialist	468 (0.1%)	0 (0.0%)	0 / 106
Democratic Socialist	177 (0.0%)	0 (0.0%)	0 / 106

↓
23	1	82

=== Results by borough ===
==== Bolton ====
Party	Votes		Seats		
Conservative Party	42,597 (55.9%)	▲12.8	8 (80.0%)	8 / 10	▲5
Labour Party	24,581 (32.3%)	▼14.4	2 (20.0%)	2 / 10	▼5
Liberal Party	5,505 (7.2%)	▼2.7	0 (0.0%)	0 / 10	Steady
Independent	1,812 (2.4%)	N/A	0 (0.0%)	0 / 10	N/A
National Front	1,688 (2.2%)	N/A	0 (0.0%)	0 / 10	N/A

==== Bury ====
Party	Votes		Seats		
Conservative Party	35,756 (64.6%)	▲22.6	6 (100.0%)	6 / 6	▲5
Labour Party	16,661 (30.1%)	▼18.3	0 (0.0%)	0 / 6	▼4
Liberal Party	2,724 (4.9%)	▼4.7	0 (0.0%)	0 / 6	▼1
Communist Party	197 (0.4%)	N/A	0 (0.0%)	0 / 6	N/A

==== Manchester ====
Party	Votes		Seats		
Conservative Party	73,518 (53.0%)	▲8.2	14 (70.0%)	14 / 20	▲3
Labour Party	56,132 (40.7%)	▼7.3	6 (30.0%)	6 / 20	▼3
Liberal Party	4,532 (3.3%)	▼2.7	0 (0.0%)	0 / 20	Steady
National Front	2,507 (1.8%)	N/A	0 (0.0%)	0 / 20	N/A
Independent	1,173 (0.8%)	▲0.7	0 (0.0%)	0 / 20	Steady
Communist Party	143 (0.1%)	▼0.6	0 (0.0%)	0 / 20	Steady
Socialist Alternative	69 (0.0%)	N/A	0 (0.0%)	0 / 20	N/A

==== Oldham ====
Party	Votes	Seats	
Labour Party	27,508 (43.9%)	7 (77.8%)	7 / 9
Liberal Party	16,441 (26.2%)	2 (22.2%)	2 / 9
Conservative Party	18,318 (29.2%)	0 (0.0%)	0 / 9
Communist Party	392 (0.6%)	0 (0.0%)	0 / 9

==== Rochdale ====
Party	Votes	Seats	
Labour Party	25,832 (47.7%)	4 (57.1%)	4 / 7
Conservative Party	19,527 (36.0%)	2 (28.6%)	2 / 7
Liberal Party	6,652 (12.3%)	1 (14.3%)	1 / 7
Anti-Immigration	1,740 (3.2%)	0 (0.0%)	0 / 7
Communist Party	448 (0.8%)	0 (0.0%)	0 / 7

==== Salford ====
Party	Votes	Seats	
Labour Party	37,164 (55.3%)	10 (83.3%)	10 / 12
Conservative Party	24,501 (36.4%)	2 (16.7%)	2 / 12
Liberal Party	3,887 (5.8%)	0 (0.0%)	0 / 12
Communist Party	1,694 (2.5%)	0 (0.0%)	0 / 12

==== Stockport ====
Party	Votes	Seats	
Liberal Party	38,954 (39.6%)	6 (54.5%)	6 / 11
Labour Party	23,109 (23.5%)	3 (27.3%)	3 / 11
Conservative Party	36,389 (37.0%)	2 (18.2%)	2 / 11

==== Tameside ====
Party	Votes	Seats	
Labour Party	29,483 (53.4%)	8 (88.9%)	8 / 9
Conservative Party	20,533 (37.2%)	1 (11.1%)	1 / 9
Liberal Party	5,161 (9.4%)	0 (0.0%)	0 / 9

==== Trafford ====
Party	Votes	Seats	
Conservative Party	30,904 (42.8%)	3 (33.3%)	3 / 9
Labour Party	22,251 (30.8%)	3 (33.3%)	3 / 9
Liberal Party	18,133 (25.1%)	3 (33.3%)	3 / 9
Communist Party	941 (1.3%)	0 (0.0%)	0 / 9

==== Wigan ====
Party	Votes	Seats	
Labour Party	37,504 (67.1%)	13 (100.0%)	13 / 13
Conservative Party	16,690 (29.8%)	0 (0.0%)	0 / 13
Independent	1,269 (2.3%)	0 (0.0%)	0 / 13
Independent Socialist	468 (0.8%)	0 (0.0%)	0 / 13

== Ward results ==
=== Bolton ===
==== Bolton No.1 ====
Bolton No.1
Party	Candidate	Votes	%	±%
Conservative	D. Ward	6,686	71.5	+4.6
Labour	A. Fairhurst	1,777	19.0	−14.1
Liberal	J. Rothwell	463	5.0	N/A
National Front	J. Walsh	419	4.5	N/A
Majority		4,909	52.5	+18.7
Turnout		9,345		
Conservative hold		Swing		

==== Bolton No.2 ====
Bolton No.2
Party	Candidate	Votes	%	±%
Conservative	I. C. Chesney	5,298	53.9	+6.2
Labour	D. Dingwall*	3,738	38.0	−11.8
Liberal	M. S. Marsh	460	4.7	N/A
National Front	W. A. Owen	339	3.4	N/A
Majority		1,560	15.9	
Turnout		9,835		
Conservative gain from Labour		Swing		

==== Bolton No.3 ====
Bolton No.3
Party	Candidate	Votes	%	±%
Labour	J. A. Foster*	3,160	55.5	−10.8
Conservative	F. R. Yardley	1,980	34.8	+1.1
Liberal	J. W. Walton	323	5.7	N/A
National Front	L. M. Bromilow	227	4.0	N/A
Majority		1,180	20.7	−11.8
Turnout		5,690		
Labour hold		Swing		

==== Bolton No.4 ====
Bolton No.4
Party	Candidate	Votes	%	±%
Conservative	F. Telford*	4,192	49.5	+7.2
Labour	B. Iddon	3,644	43.0	−14.7
National Front	J. Hamilton	389	4.6	N/A
Liberal	E. G. Bell	249	2.9	N/A
Majority		548	6.5	
Turnout		8,474		
Conservative hold		Swing		

==== Bolton No.5 ====
Bolton No.5
Party	Candidate	Votes	%	±%
Conservative	W. Walsh	4,841	61.6	+7.2
Labour	E. O. Hamer	2,273	28.9	−16.7
Liberal	F. H. Fish	404	5.1	N/A
National Front	D. G. Austin	344	4.4	N/A
Majority		2,568	32.7	+24.0
Turnout		7,863		
Conservative hold		Swing		

==== Farnworth ====
Farnworth
Party	Candidate	Votes	%	±%
Labour	J. M. White*	2,413	46.9	−18.6
Conservative	M. V. Kershaw	2,156	41.9	+7.4
Liberal	S. P. Lawrence	580	11.2	N/A
Majority		257	5.0	−26.0
Turnout		5,149		
Labour hold		Swing		

==== Horwich ====
Horwich
Party	Candidate	Votes	%	±%
Conservative	S. Dawson	3,425	46.1	+19.6
Labour	V. A. Dingwall	2,195	29.5	−21.2
Independent	L. G. Fearnhead	1,812	24.4	N/A
Majority		1,230	16.6	
Turnout		7,432		
Conservative gain from Labour		Swing		

==== Kearsley ====
Kearsley
Party	Candidate	Votes	%	±%
Conservative	D. E. Dziubas	2,818	42.9	+17.9
Labour	M. S. Parry	1,965	29.9	−7.7
Liberal	M. P. Rothwell	1,783	27.2	−8.2
Majority		853	13.0	
Turnout		6,566		
Conservative gain from Labour		Swing		

==== Turton ====
Turton
Party	Candidate	Votes	%	±%
Conservative	B. H. Tetlow*	7,702	75.7	+28.5
Labour	B. Turner	1,603	15.8	−5.1
Liberal	C. G. Coomer	868	8.5	−23.4
Majority		6,099	60.0	+44.8
Turnout		10,173		
Conservative hold		Swing		

==== Westhoughton ====
Westhoughton
Party	Candidate	Votes	%	±%
Conservative	J. Smith	3,481	61.2	+16.0
Labour	A. M. Moon	1,813	31.9	−22.9
Liberal	J. M. Davies	395	6.9	N/A
Majority		1,668	29.3	
Turnout		5,689		
Conservative win (new seat)				

=== Bury ===
==== Bury No.1 ====
Bury No.1
Party	Candidate	Votes	%	±%
Conservative	K. F. Whyman	7,427	68.2	+20.4
Labour	T. Holt	2,468	22.7	−29.5
Liberal	R. L. Johnson	797	7.3	N/A
Communist	J. Newby	197	1.8	N/A
Majority		4,959	45.5	
Turnout		10,889		
Conservative gain from Labour		Swing		

==== Bury No.2 ====
Bury No.2
Party	Candidate	Votes	%	±%
Conservative	J. Scholes	5,951	63.5	+28.1
Labour	T. H. Woods	3,427	36.5	−28.1
Majority		2,524	27.0	
Turnout		9,378		
Conservative gain from Labour		Swing		

==== Prestwich ====
Prestwich
Party	Candidate	Votes	%	±%
Conservative	M. Berry	6,183	59.2	+31.0
Labour	M. Jowett	2,327	22.3	−0.1
Liberal	S. Pepperman	1,927	18.5	−30.9
Majority		3,856	36.9	
Turnout		10,437		
Conservative gain from Liberal		Swing		

==== Radcliffe ====
Radcliffe
Party	Candidate	Votes	%	±%
Conservative	A. Shea	5,053	58.7	+15.4
Labour	G. Colin*	3,553	41.3	−15.4
Majority		1,500	17.4	
Turnout		8,606		
Conservative gain from Labour		Swing		

==== Ramsbottom ====
Ramsbottom
Party	Candidate	Votes	%	±%
Conservative	W. R. Kirkpatrick*	6,489	77.4	+20.7
Labour	M. Payne	1,895	22.6	−20.7
Majority		4,594	54.8	+41.4
Turnout		8,384		
Conservative hold		Swing		

==== Whitefield ====
Whitefield
Party	Candidate	Votes	%	±%
Conservative	G. R. Marks	4,653	60.9	+14.6
Labour	M. R. Wilson	2,991	39.1	−14.6
Majority		1,662	21.8	
Turnout		7,644		
Conservative gain from Labour		Swing		

=== Manchester ===
==== Manchester No.1 ====
Manchester No.1
Party	Candidate	Votes	%	±%
Conservative	A. E. Walsh*	2,086	51.1	+12.0
Labour	A. Lister	1,862	45.6	−15.3
National Front	C. Maskell	135	3.3	N/A
Majority		224	5.5	
Turnout		4,083		
Conservative hold		Swing		

==== Manchester No.2 ====
Manchester No.2
Party	Candidate	Votes	%	±%
Labour	J. Taylor	2,202	52.1	−13.2
Conservative	L. Hockey	1,819	43.1	+8.4
National Front	A. Coles	202	4.8	N/A
Majority		383	9.0	−21.5
Turnout		4,223		
Labour hold		Swing		

==== Manchester No.3 ====
Manchester No.3
Party	Candidate	Votes	%	±%
Conservative	F. R. Butler*	2,887	62.3	+1.6
Labour	W. Edwards	1,339	28.9	−10.4
Liberal	A. E. Griffiths	252	5.4	N/A
National Front	N. T. G. Wallace	154	3.4	N/A
Majority		1,548	33.4	+12.0
Turnout		4,632		
Conservative hold		Swing		

==== Manchester No.4 ====
Manchester No.4
Party	Candidate	Votes	%	±%
Conservative	A. G. Thornhill*	3,118	70.4	+8.7
Labour	K. C. Bodfish	1,312	29.6	−8.7
Majority		1,806	40.8	+17.4
Turnout		4,430		
Conservative hold		Swing		

==== Manchester No.5 ====
Manchester No.5
Party	Candidate	Votes	%	±%
Labour	B. S. Langton*	2,253	55.2	−8.8
Conservative	F. Meaden	1,832	44.8	+8.8
Majority		421	10.4	−17.6
Turnout		4,085		
Labour hold		Swing		

==== Manchester No.6 ====
Manchester No.6
Party	Candidate	Votes	%	±%
Conservative	A. S. Lea	4,643	49.4	+5.3
Labour	A. D. Kelly*	4,015	42.7	−13.2
Liberal	J. Cookson	440	4.7	N/A
National Front	N. E. Caffrey	305	3.2	N/A
Majority		628	6.7	
Turnout		9,403		
Conservative gain from Labour		Swing		

==== Manchester No.7 ====
Manchester No.7
Party	Candidate	Votes	%	±%
Conservative	N. A. Green*	6,292	63.9	+24.4
Labour	J. E. Weaver	3,559	36.1	−2.6
Majority		2,733	27.8	+26.9
Turnout		9,851		
Conservative hold		Swing		

==== Manchester No.8 ====
Manchester No.8
Party	Candidate	Votes	%	±%
Labour	A. H. Fender	2,382	49.8	−22.6
Independent	T. McClure	1,173	24.5	N/A
Conservative	R. Moss	1,085	22.7	+1.0
Communist	D. A. Leon	143	3.0	−2.9
Majority		1,209	25.3	−25.4
Turnout		4,783		
Labour hold		Swing		

==== Manchester No.9 ====
Manchester No.9
Party	Candidate	Votes	%	±%
Conservative	J. Kershaw	3,340	48.2	+16.6
Labour	T. O. Hamnett*	3,238	46.7	−21.7
National Front	N. J. Mead	353	5.1	N/A
Majority		102	1.5	
Turnout		6,931		
Labour gain from Labour		Swing		

==== Manchester No.10 ====
Manchester No.10
Party	Candidate	Votes	%	±%
Labour	G. Mann*	5,070	53.3	−11.4
Conservative	J. C. Ridgard	3,255	34.2	+2.7
Liberal	H. Griffiths	821	8.6	N/A
National Front	J. J. Bogle	368	3.9	N/A
Majority		1,815	19.1	−14.0
Turnout		9,514		
Labour hold		Swing		

==== Manchester No.11 ====
Manchester No.11
Party	Candidate	Votes	%	±%
Labour	A. S. Goldstone*	4,316	60.6	−2.4
Conservative	K. O'Brien	2,801	39.3	+6.9
Majority		1,515	21.2	−9.3
Turnout		7,117		
Labour hold		Swing		

==== Manchester No.12 ====
Manchester No.12
Party	Candidate	Votes	%	±%
Conservative	R. A. Fieldhouse*	3,032	55.9	+1.3
Labour	J. M. Wilson	1,745	32.2	−13.2
Liberal	K. A. Whitmore	646	11.9	N/A
Majority		1,287	23.7	+14.5
Turnout		5,423		
Conservative hold		Swing		

==== Manchester No.13 ====
Manchester No.13
Party	Candidate	Votes	%	±%
Conservative	B. B. Williams	5,927	60.2	+16.1
Labour	R. Heys	2,535	27.8	−2.0
Liberal	R. A. Bell	976	9.9	−18.2
National Front	M. Kelly	403	4.1	N/A
Majority		3,392	34.4	+18.4
Turnout		9,841		
Conservative hold		Swing		

==== Manchester No.14 ====
Manchester No.14
Party	Candidate	Votes	%	±%
Conservative	T. F. Lavin*	5,556	68.4	+5.5
Labour	A. Dermody	2,568	31.6	−5.5
Majority		2,988	36.8	+11.0
Turnout		8,124		
Conservative hold		Swing		

==== Manchester No.15 ====
Manchester No.15
Party	Candidate	Votes	%	±%
Conservative	D. Lee*	4,621	75.9	+4.0
Labour	M. R. Parker	1,467	24.1	−0.7
Majority		3,154	51.8	+4.7
Turnout		6,088		
Conservative hold		Swing		

==== Manchester No.16 ====
Manchester No.16
Party	Candidate	Votes	%	±%
Labour	J. G. Birtles*	3,112	63.2	−17.7
Conservative	A. E. Halliday	1,344	27.3	+8.2
National Front	A. D. Jones	396	8.0	N/A
Socialist Alternative	K. D. Underhill	69	1.5	N/A
Majority		1,768	35.9	−25.9
Turnout		4,921		
Labour hold		Swing		

==== Manchester No.17 ====
Manchester No.17
Party	Candidate	Votes	%	±%
Conservative	P. Buckley	7,094	61.6	+12.9
Labour	G. M. Fahey	3,218	27.9	+10.6
Liberal	J. I. Thornton	1,011	8.8	−19.0
National Front	R. Kilminster	191	1.7	N/A
Majority		3,876	33.7	+12.8
Turnout		11,514		
Conservative hold		Swing		

==== Manchester No.18 ====
Manchester No.18
Party	Candidate	Votes	%	±%
Conservative	M. L. Davies	2,521	54.0	+9.7
Labour	G. M. Morton*	2,145	46.0	−9.7
Majority		376	8.0	
Turnout		4,666		
Conservative gain from Labour		Swing		

==== Manchester No.19 ====
Manchester No.19
Party	Candidate	Votes	%	±%
Conservative	G. Leigh*	3,438	54.5	−0.2
Labour	A. J. Spencer	2,488	39.4	−5.9
Liberal	L. Griffiths	386	6.1	N/A
Majority		950	15.1	+5.6
Turnout		6,312		
Conservative hold		Swing		

==== Manchester No.20 ====
Manchester No.20
Party	Candidate	Votes	%	±%
Conservative	I. K. Paley*	6,827	56.3	+6.1
Labour	D. Lynch	5,306	43.7	−6.1
Majority		1,521	12.6	+12.2
Turnout		12,133		
Conservative hold		Swing		

=== Oldham ===
==== Chadderton ====
Chadderton
Party	Candidate	Votes	%	±%
Labour	W. Gresty	2,899	51.2	
Conservative	H. Travis	1,747	30.9	
Liberal	P. E. Cooke	1,013	17.9	
Majority		1,152	20.3	
Turnout		5,659		
Labour win (new seat)				

==== Crompton ====
Crompton
Party	Candidate	Votes	%	±%
Labour	J. Read	2,839	44.3	
Conservative	I. Scott	2,253	35.1	
Liberal	C. G. Hillyer	1,321	20.6	
Majority		586	9.1	
Turnout		6,413		
Labour win (new seat)				

==== Failsworth ====
Failsworth
Party	Candidate	Votes	%	±%
Labour	C. E. Tucker	3,168	46.4	
Conservative	K. L. Rowland	2,109	30.9	
Liberal	F. Platt	1,352	19.8	
Communist	E. Crawford	201	2.9	
Majority		1,059	15.5	
Turnout		6,830		
Labour win (new seat)				

==== Oldham No.1 ====
Oldham No.1
Party	Candidate	Votes	%	±%
Labour	E. Brierley	3,338	48.5	
Liberal	A. J. Adler	2,014	29.3	
Conservative	A. B. Jowett	1,529	22.2	
Majority		1,324	19.2	
Turnout		6,881		
Labour win (new seat)				

==== Oldham No.2 ====
Oldham No.2
Party	Candidate	Votes	%	±%
Labour	G. Whitehead	2,970	50.3	
Conservative	J. T. Fletcher	1,663	28.2	
Liberal	M. I. Pendlebury	1,274	21.6	
Majority		1,307	22.1	
Turnout		5,907		
Labour win (new seat)				

==== Oldham No.3 ====
Oldham No.3
Party	Candidate	Votes	%	±%
Labour	A. Tweedale	3,489	48.6	
Conservative	D. Smith	2,215	30.9	
Liberal	R. N. Cooke	1,474	20.5	
Majority		1,274	17.7	
Turnout		7,178		
Labour win (new seat)				

==== Oldham No.4 ====
Oldham No.4
Party	Candidate	Votes	%	±%
Labour	J. K. Leyden	4,338	54.7	
Conservative	G. J. Wilson	2,074	26.1	
Liberal	W. R. Wheeler	1,329	16.8	
Communist	J. B. Round	191	2.3	
Majority		2,264	28.5	
Turnout		7,932		
Labour win (new seat)				

==== Royton ====
Royton
Party	Candidate	Votes	%	±%
Liberal	W. E. Critchley	2,970	40.8	
Labour	S. G. W. Jacobs	2,387	32.8	
Conservative	R. Dearden	1,929	26.5	
Majority		583	8.0	
Turnout		7,286		
Liberal win (new seat)				

==== Saddleworth ====
Saddleworth
Party	Candidate	Votes	%	±%
Liberal	G. E. Lord	3,694	43.1	
Conservative	H. Jagger	2,799	32.6	
Labour	J. B. Battye	2,080	24.3	
Majority		895	10.4	
Turnout		8,573		
Liberal win (new seat)				

=== Rochdale ===
==== Heywood ====
Heywood
Party	Candidate	Votes	%	±%
Labour	J. Connell	4,979	60.1	
Conservative	M. W. Ingoe	3,312	39.9	
Majority		1,667	20.1	
Turnout		8,291		
Labour win (new seat)				

==== Middleton North West ====
Middleton North West
Party	Candidate	Votes	%	±%
Labour	N. V. Weall	3,931	64.6	
Conservative	P. N. E. Hawton	2,150	35.4	
Majority		1,781	29.3	
Turnout		6,081		
Labour win (new seat)				

==== Middleton South East ====
Middleton South East
Party	Candidate	Votes	%	±%
Conservative	J. H. Berry	2,921	50.7	
Labour	A. J. Cleasby	2,662	46.2	
Communist	A. Frost	180	3.1	
Majority		259	4.5	
Turnout		5,763		
Conservative win (new seat)				

==== Rochdale No.1 ====
Rochdale No.1
Party	Candidate	Votes	%	±%
Labour	J. S. Williams	4,501	58.0	
Conservative	C. Ogden	3,261	42.0	
Majority		1,240	16.0	
Turnout		7,762		
Labour win (new seat)				

==== Rochdale No.2 ====
Rochdale No.2
Party	Candidate	Votes	%	±%
Conservative	C. Haigh	3,778	48.7	
Labour	T. Duffy	3,711	47.8	
Communist	S. Hodgkinson	268	3.5	
Majority		67	0.9	
Turnout		6,404		
Conservative win (new seat)				

==== Rochdale No.3 ====
Rochdale No.3
Party	Candidate	Votes	%	±%
Liberal	T. Chadwick	3,927	44.3	
Labour	J. F. Grant	2,738	30.9	
Conservative	R. K. Bentley	2,192	24.7	
Majority		1,189	13.4	
Turnout		8,857		
Liberal win (new seat)				

==== Rochdale No.4 ====
Rochdale No.4
Party	Candidate	Votes	%	±%
Labour	H. Matthews	3,310	34.2	
Liberal	J. A. Kielty	2,725	28.1	
Conservative	J. E. Fletcher	1,913	19.7	
Anti-Immigration	M. W. Sellors	1,740	18.0	
Majority		585	6.0	
Turnout		9,688		
Labour win (new seat)				

=== Salford ===
==== Eccles ====
Eccles
Party	Candidate	Votes	%	±%
Labour	K. Mechan	2,491	48.5	
Conservative	T. Francis	2,481	48.3	
Communist	H. Harwood	161	3.1	
Majority		10	0.2	
Turnout		5,133		
Labour win (new seat)				

==== Eccles-Patricroft ====
Eccles-Patricroft
Party	Candidate	Votes	%	±%
Labour	J. G. Smith	3,652	59.7	
Conservative	J. G. Hardaway	2,258	36.9	
Communist	H. Cottam	205	3.4	
Majority		1,394	22.8	
Turnout		6,115		
Labour win (new seat)				

==== Irlam ====
Irlam
Party	Candidate	Votes	%	±%
Labour	M. G. Roberts	2,961	54.0	
Conservative	R. S. Gordon	2,291	41.8	
Communist	T. D. Robinson	232	4.2	
Majority		670	12.2	
Turnout		5,485		
Labour win (new seat)				

==== Pendlebury ====
Pendlebury
Party	Candidate	Votes	%	±%
Labour	T. G. Harrison	2,899	65.6	
Conservative	F. M. France	1,320	29.9	
Communist	A. J. Lewis	201	4.5	
Majority		1,579	35.7	
Turnout		4,420		
Labour win (new seat)				

==== Salford No.1 ====
Salford No.1
Party	Candidate	Votes	%	±%
Labour	G. Stonehouse	2,254	42.8	
Conservative	V. E. Smith	1,435	27.3	
Liberal	M. Corwin	1,423	27.0	
Communist	E. Plumbley	149	2.8	
Majority		819	15.6	
Turnout		5,261		
Labour win (new seat)				

==== Salford No.2 ====
Salford No.2
Party	Candidate	Votes	%	±%
Labour	N. Briggs	2,853	62.1	
Liberal	E. J. Hyde	904	19.7	
Conservative	S. R. Latimer	837	18.2	
Majority		1,949	42.4	
Turnout		4,594		
Labour win (new seat)				

==== Salford No.3 ====
Salford No.3
Party	Candidate	Votes	%	±%
Labour	H. Williams	2,726	56.2	
Liberal	J. Whittaker	1,560	32.2	
Conservative	A. Sacks	562	11.6	
Majority		1,166	24.1	
Turnout		4,848		
Labour win (new seat)				

==== Salford No.4 ====
Salford No.4
Party	Candidate	Votes	%	±%
Labour	E. D. G. Robinson	3,494	63.6	
Conservative	A. R. Foulkes	1,817	33.1	
Communist	J. A. Brogan	181	3.3	
Majority		1,677	30.5	
Turnout		5,492		
Labour win (new seat)				

==== Salford No.5 ====
Salford No.5
Party	Candidate	Votes	%	±%
Conservative	J. M. Ford	2,983	52.5	
Labour	I. Zott	2,701	47.5	
Majority		282	5.0	
Turnout		5,684		
Conservative win (new seat)				

==== Swinton ====
Swinton
Party	Candidate	Votes	%	±%
Labour	I. Jones	3,646	52.7	
Conservative	E. W. Muldoon	3,030	43.8	
Communist	H. Crellin	241	3.5	
Majority		616	8.9	
Turnout		6,917		
Labour win (new seat)				

==== Worsley No.1 ====
Worsley No.1
Party	Candidate	Votes	%	±%
Labour	W. R. Pennington	4,431	71.3	
Conservative	J. A. Dargie	1,461	23.5	
Communist	P. T. Willetts	324	5.2	
Majority		2,970	47.8	
Turnout		6,216		
Labour win (new seat)				

==== Worsley No.2 ====
Worsley No.2
Party	Candidate	Votes	%	±%
Conservative	J. Bingham	4,026	56.8	
Labour	J. L. Anderson	3,056	43.2	
Majority		970	13.7	
Turnout		7,082		
Conservative win (new seat)				

=== Stockport ===
==== Bredbury & Romiley ====
Bredbury & Romiley
Party	Candidate	Votes	%	±%
Liberal	D. W. Tattersall	5,190	46.1	
Conservative	J. G. Howe	3,366	29.9	
Labour	P. C. Snape	2,704	24.0	
Majority		1,824	16.2	
Turnout		11,260	52.8	
Liberal win (new seat)				

==== Cheadle & Gatley No.1 ====
Cheadle & Gatley No.1
Party	Candidate	Votes	%	±%
Liberal	C. Penney	6,257	50.8	
Conservative	A. Richardson	4,868	39.5	
Labour	J. O. Lewis	1,194	9.7	
Majority		1,389	11.3	
Turnout		12,319	52.6	
Liberal win (new seat)				

==== Cheadle & Gatley No.2 ====
Cheadle & Gatley No.2
Party	Candidate	Votes	%	±%
Liberal	L. G. Bayley	4,822	49.7	
Conservative	B. Barker	3,589	37.0	
Labour	R. N. Hughes	1,287	13.3	
Majority		1,233	12.7	
Turnout		9,698	48.7	
Liberal win (new seat)				

==== Hazel Grove & Bramhall No.1 ====
Hazel Grove & Bramhall No.1
Party	Candidate	Votes	%	±%
Liberal	C. J. Walker	3,901	62.1	
Conservative	P. Orton	1,905	30.3	
Labour	R. McKnight	472	7.5	
Majority		1,996	31.8	
Turnout		6,278	53.9	
Liberal win (new seat)				

==== Hazel Grove & Bramhall No.2 ====
Hazel Grove & Bramhall No.2
Party	Candidate	Votes	%	±%
Liberal	R. A. Tilley	4,759	50.3	
Conservative	J. B. Leck	4,331	45.8	
Labour	M. Pollard	370	3.9	
Majority		428	4.5	
Turnout		9,460	56.4	
Liberal win (new seat)				

==== Marple ====
Marple
Party	Candidate	Votes	%	±%
Liberal	R. N. Cuss	4,427	49.4	
Conservative	M. Yates	3,596	40.1	
Labour	H. J. Abrams	940	10.5	
Majority		831	9.3	
Turnout		8,963	52.2	
Liberal win (new seat)				

==== Stockport No.1 ====
Stockport No.1
Party	Candidate	Votes	%	±%
Labour	J. B. Clarke	2,880	50.1	
Conservative	D. F. Bath	1,509	26.2	
Liberal	C. J. Carter	1,360	23.7	
Majority		1,371	23.8	
Turnout		5,749	33.5	
Labour win (new seat)				

==== Stockport No.2 ====
Stockport No.2
Party	Candidate	Votes	%	±%
Conservative	J. C. F. Crowther	3,554	44.1	
Labour	E. Wood	2,375	29.5	
Liberal	J. S. Hosking	2,129	26.4	
Majority		1,179	14.6	
Turnout		8,058	43.2	
Conservative win (new seat)				

==== Stockport No.3 ====
Stockport No.3
Party	Candidate	Votes	%	±%
Labour	J. C. Tucker	4,396	47.6	
Conservative	B. Downs	2,855	30.9	
Liberal	P. J. Arnold	1,983	21.5	
Majority		1,541	16.7	
Turnout		9,234	39.4	
Labour win (new seat)				

==== Stockport No.4 ====
Stockport No.4
Party	Candidate	Votes	%	±%
Conservative	J. A. MacCarron	4,396	54.7	
Liberal	A. R. Cottam	1,921	23.9	
Labour	D. Robinson	1,721	21.4	
Majority		2,475	30.8	
Turnout		8,038	45.2	
Conservative win (new seat)				

==== Stockport No.5 ====
Stockport No.5
Party	Candidate	Votes	%	±%
Labour	P. G. L. Scott	4,770	50.5	
Conservative	W. R. Thomson	2,420	26.2	
Liberal	J. D. C. Hunt	2,205	23.3	
Majority		2,300	24.4	
Turnout		9,445	41.2	
Labour win (new seat)				

=== Tameside ===
==== Ashton-under-Lyne No.1 ====
Ashton-under-Lyne No.1
Party	Candidate	Votes	%	±%
Labour	B. R. Dobbins	3,541	52.7	
Conservative	J. Fletcher	3,180	47.3	
Majority		361	5.4	
Turnout		6,721		
Labour win (new seat)				

==== Ashton-under-Lyne No.2 ====
Ashton-under-Lyne No.2
Party	Candidate	Votes	%	±%
Labour	H. Davies	3,977	63.7	
Conservative	W. Dunkerley	2,262	36.3	
Majority		1,715	27.5	
Turnout		6,239		
Labour win (new seat)				

==== Audenshaw ====
Audenshaw
Party	Candidate	Votes	%	±%
Labour	J. I. Allsopp	3,417	55.0	
Conservative	G. I. Lomas	2,799	45.0	
Majority		618	9.9	
Turnout		6,216		
Labour win (new seat)				

==== Denton ====
Denton
Party	Candidate	Votes	%	±%
Labour	M. Wareing	3,543	45.7	
Conservative	J. R. Martin	2,643	34.1	
Liberal	J. Ward	1,559	20.1	
Majority		900	11.6	
Turnout		7,745		
Labour win (new seat)				

==== Droylesden ====
Droylesden
Party	Candidate	Votes	%	±%
Labour	G. E. Pailin	3,029	44.3	
Liberal	T. J. Dowse	2,438	35.7	
Conservative	M. Paley	1,363	20.0	
Majority		591	8.7	
Turnout		6,830		
Labour win (new seat)				

==== Dukinfield ====
Dukinfield
Party	Candidate	Votes	%	±%
Labour	W. Birtwistle	3,565	66.3	
Conservative	E. Tetlow	1,815	33.7	
Majority		1,750	32.5	
Turnout		5,380		
Labour win (new seat)				

==== Hyde No.1 ====
Hyde No.1
Party	Candidate	Votes	%	±%
Labour	T. Langford	3,291	65.8	
Conservative	W. F. Griffiths	1,713	34.2	
Majority		31.5	31.5	
Turnout		5,004		
Labour win (new seat)				

==== Hyde No.2 ====
Hyde No.2
Party	Candidate	Votes	%	±%
Conservative	A. Eddowes	2,957	51.2	
Labour	J. Fitzpatrick	2,820	48.8	
Majority		137	2.4	
Turnout		5,757		
Conservative win (new seat)				

==== Stalybridge ====
Stalybridge
Party	Candidate	Votes	%	±%
Labour	K. F. Rae	2,300	43.7	
Conservative	S. Hall	1,801	34.2	
Liberal	N. T. A. Greenwood	1,164	22.1	
Majority		499	9.5	
Turnout		5,265		
Labour win (new seat)				

=== Trafford ===
==== Altrincham No.1 ====
Altrincham No.1
Party	Candidate	Votes	%	±%
Labour	A. D. Johnson	3,739	48.8	
Conservative	C. Harrison	3,563	46.5	
Communist	E. J. Wilkinson	359	4.7	
Majority		176	2.3	
Turnout		7,661		
Labour win (new seat)				

==== Altrincham No.2 ====
Altrincham No.2
Party	Candidate	Votes	%	±%
Liberal	S. Williamson	3,581	44.4	
Conservative	R. Hall	2,434	30.2	
Labour	R. Crossman	1,969	24.4	
Communist	J. Brenner	87	1.1	
Majority		1,147	14.2	
Turnout		8,071		
Liberal win (new seat)				

==== Hale ====
Hale
Party	Candidate	Votes	%	±%
Conservative	R. A. Roberts	5,423	63.9	
Liberal	S. M. Farnsworth	2,157	25.4	
Labour	J. D. Kill	904	10.7	
Majority		3,266	38.5	
Turnout		8,484		
Conservative win (new seat)				

==== Sale No.1 ====
Sale No.1
Party	Candidate	Votes	%	±%
Conservative	D. I. Carter	3,923	42.9	
Labour	R. C. Wallis	2,743	30.0	
Liberal	J. Keohane	2,490	27.2	
Majority		1,180	12.9	
Turnout		9,156		
Conservative win (new seat)				

==== Sale No.2 ====
Sale No.2
Party	Candidate	Votes	%	±%
Liberal	J. Harries	4,551	45.8	
Conservative	P. A. A. Pepper	3,284	33.1	
Labour	C. H. Merry	1,921	19.3	
Communist	A. H. Burrage	180	1.8	
Majority		1,267	12.8	
Turnout		9,936		
Liberal win (new seat)				

==== Stretford ====
Stretford
Party	Candidate	Votes	%	±%
Labour	H. S. Armitage	4,416	50.4	
Conservative	E. Forbes	4,033	46.0	
Communist	A. Jarratt	315	3.6	
Majority		383	4.4	
Turnout		8,764		
Labour win (new seat)				

==== Stretford-Old Trafford ====
Stretford-Old Trafford
Party	Candidate	Votes	%	±%
Labour	D. F. Sullivan	2,772	51.3	
Conservative	R. D. Doherty	2,629	48.7	
Majority		143	2.6	
Turnout		5,401		
Labour win (new seat)				

==== Urmston No.1 ====
Urmston No.1
Party	Candidate	Votes	%	±%
Liberal	A. Pitt	3,249	40.1	
Conservative	E. J. Boardman	3,025	37.3	
Labour	J. R. Haydock	1,835	22.6	
Majority		224	2.8	
Turnout		8,109		
Liberal win (new seat)				

==== Urmston No.2 ====
Urmston No.2
Party	Candidate	Votes	%	±%
Conservative	E. A. Durant	2,590	39.0	
Liberal	A. E. Anstall	2,105	31.7	
Labour	D. L. Stewart	1,952	29.4	
Majority		485	7.3	
Turnout		6,647		
Conservative win (new seat)				

=== Wigan ===
==== Ashton-in-Makerfield ====
Ashton-in-Makerfield
Party	Candidate	Votes	%	±%
Labour	G. Lockett	3,724	78.5	
Conservative	A. Emmett	1,019	21.5	
Majority		2,705	57.0	
Turnout		4,743		
Labour win (new seat)				

==== Atherton ====
Atherton
Party	Candidate	Votes	%	±%
Labour	W. Murphy	3,291	65.2	
Conservative	M. Williams	1,757	34.8	
Majority		1,534	30.4	
Turnout		5,048		
Labour win (new seat)				

==== Golborne ====
Golborne
Party	Candidate	Votes	%	±%
Labour	F. J. Newton	6,751	75.4	
Conservative	T. R. Thompson	2,198	24.6	
Majority		4,553	50.8	
Turnout		8,949		
Labour win (new seat)				

==== Hindley ====
Hindley
Party	Candidate	Votes	%	±%
Labour	W. S. Simmons	4,550	74.6	
Conservative	R. Hughes	1,546	25.4	
Majority		3,004	49.2	
Turnout		6,096		
Labour win (new seat)				

==== Ince-in-Makerfield ====
Ince-in-Makerfield
Party	Candidate	Votes	%	±%
Labour	J. Horrocks	uncontested		
Labour win (new seat)				

==== Leigh East ====
Leigh East
Party	Candidate	Votes	%	±%
Labour	F. Taylor	3,230	50.9	
Conservative	E. Green	3,115	49.1	
Majority		115	1.8	
Turnout		6,345		
Labour win (new seat)				

==== Leigh West ====
Leigh West
Party	Candidate	Votes	%	±%
Labour	H. Davies	3,860	76.1	
Conservative	S. Johnson	1,211	23.9	
Majority		2,649	52.2	
Turnout		5,071		
Labour win (new seat)				

==== Orrell ====
Orrell
Party	Candidate	Votes	%	±%
Labour	D. Bennett	3,136	60.9	
Conservative	J. C. Simpkin	2,011	39.1	
Majority		1,125	21.8	
Turnout		5,147		
Labour win (new seat)				

==== Standish-Langtree ====
Standish-Langtree
Party	Candidate	Votes	%	±%
Labour	J. Higham	5,563	59.2	
Conservative	T. Barnes	3,833	40.8	
Majority		1,730	18.4	
Turnout		9,396		
Labour win (new seat)				

==== Tyldesley ====
Tyldesley
Party	Candidate	Votes	%	±%
Labour	G. C. Thomas	3,399	66.1	
Independent	P. Naylor	1,269	24.7	
Ind. Socialist	J. C. Barnes	468	9.1	
Majority		2,130	41.4	
Turnout		5,139		
Labour win (new seat)				

==== Wigan ====
Wigan (3 seats)
Party	Candidate	Votes	%	±%
Labour	W. Blackledge	uncontested		
Labour	E. Cowser	uncontested		
Labour	J. A. Greenall	uncontested		
Labour win (new seat)				
Labour win (new seat)				
Labour win (new seat)				
