= 1977 Banff and Buchan District Council election =

1977 Scottish local government election

- 3 May 1977

All 18 seats to Banff and Buchan District Council 10 seats needed for a majority
- Turnout: 33.6%
	First party	Second party
Party	Independent	SNP
Last election	15 seats, 71.4%	Did not contest
Seats won	17	1
Seat change	▲2	▲1
Popular vote	7,387	1,711
Percentage	75.9%	17.6%
Swing	▲4.5%	New
- Council composition following the election

Elections to Banff and Buchan District Council were held on 3 May 1977, on the same day as the other Scottish local government elections. This was the second election to the district council following the implementation of the Local Government (Scotland) Act 1973.

The election used the 18 wards created by the Formation Electoral Arrangements in 1974. Each ward elected one councillor using first-past-the-post voting.

== Results ==
1977 Banff and Buchan District Council election result
Party	Seats	Gains	Losses	Net gain/loss	Seats %	Votes %	Votes	+/−
Independent	17	3	1	▲2	94.4	75.9	7,387	▲4.5
SNP	1	1	0	▲1	5.6	17.6	1,711	New
Ratepayers	0	0	0	Steady	0.0	3.3	320	New
Conservative	0	0	2	▼2	0.0	3.2	316	▼9.4

== Ward results ==
=== Macduff ===
Party	Candidate	Votes	%
Independent	S Mair	506	58.5
Independent	J Wood (Incumbent)	359	41.5
Majority		147	17.0
Turnout		866	32.0
Independent hold			

=== King Edward-Gamrie ===
Party	Candidate	Votes	%
Independent	A Smith	Unopposed	
Independent hold			

=== Banff-Hilton ===
Party	Candidate	Votes	%
Independent	A Gordon (Incumbent)	716	60.0
SNP	M Duncan	477	40.0
Majority		239	20.0
Turnout		1,195	36.4
Independent hold			

=== Fordyce/Boyndie ===
Party	Candidate	Votes	%
Independent	J Hay (Incumbent)	441	58.0
Ratepayers	C McKay	320	42.0
Majority		121	16.0
Turnout		761	24.4
Independent hold			

=== Aberchirder ===
Party	Candidate	Votes	%
Independent	J Shand (Incumbent)	Unopposed	
Independent hold			

=== Turriff ===
Party	Candidate	Votes	%
Independent	S Mair	606	45.6
Independent	J Dawson	554	41.7
Independent	D Duncan	170	12.8
Majority		52	3.9
Turnout		1,335	39.8
Independent hold			

=== Deer ===
Party	Candidate	Votes	%
Independent	W Cruickshank (Incumbent)	Unopposed	
Independent hold			

=== Fyvie/Monquhitter ===
Party	Candidate	Votes	%
Independent	J Gordon (Incumbent)	Unopposed	
Independent hold			

=== Meethill/Boddam ===
Party	Candidate	Votes	%
SNP	S Coull	381	50.1
Independent	W Cormack (Incumbent)	379	49.9
Majority		2	0.2
Turnout		761	23.8
SNP gain from Independent			

=== Clerkhill ===
Party	Candidate	Votes	%
Independent	D Carnie	Unopposed	
Independent hold			

=== Kirktown/Roanheads ===
Party	Candidate	Votes	%
Independent	G Baird (Incumbent)	Unopposed	
Independent gain from Labour			

=== Buchanhaven/Catto ===
Party	Candidate	Votes	%
Independent	G Milne	629	59.8
SNP	J Ingram	423	40.2
Majority		206	19.6
Turnout		1,055	31.9
Independent hold			

=== Fraserburgh Saltoun ===
Party	Candidate	Votes	%
Independent	D Swanson (Incumbent)	355	46.6
Conservative	S Green	316	41.5
Independent	G Young	91	11.9
Majority		39	5.1
Turnout		767	27.2
Independent hold			

=== Fraserburgh South/Rathen ===
Party	Candidate	Votes	%
Independent	J Fraser (Incumbent)	Unopposed	
Independent hold			

=== Fraserburgh/Broadsea ===
Party	Candidate	Votes	%
Independent	A Noble (Incumbent)	Unopposed	
Independent hold			

=== North Buchanorth ===
Party	Candidate	Votes	%
Independent	J Mitchell	980	62.5
Independent	B Campell	406	25.9
Independent	P Finnie	182	11.6
Majority		574	36.6
Turnout		1,568	44.1
Independent hold			

=== Longside/Cruden ===
Party	Candidate	Votes	%
Independent	L Cantlay (Incumbent)	1,013	70.2
SNP	J Phillips	430	29.8
Majority		583	40.4
Turnout		1,443	38.9
Independent gain from Conservative			

=== Rattray/Strichen ===
Party	Candidate	Votes	%
Independent	N Cowie (Incumbent)	Unopposed	
Independent gain from Conservative			
