= 1977 Angus District Council election =

1977 Scottish local government election

The 1977 Angus District Council election took place on the 3 May 1977 to elect members of Angus District Council, as part of that year's Scottish local elections.

== Election results ==
Angus District Election Result 1977
Party	Seats	Gains	Losses	Net gain/loss	Seats %	Votes %	Votes	+/−
Conservative	12	3	0	▲3		43.6	8,565	▼3.0
Labour	3	0	0	0		21.6	4,217	▼1.4
Independent	7	0	3	▼3		16.6	3,258	▼13.7
SNP	0	0	0	0	0.0	17.4	3,425	New
Liberal	0	0	0	0	0.0	0.8	166	New

== Ward results ==
Harbour
Party	Candidate	Votes	%	±%
Conservative	Jane S. Cuthill	559	82.1	+11.5
Labour	Ms. J. K. Cadenhead	122	17.9	−11.5
Majority		437	64.2	+22.0
Turnout		681	30.5	−12.3

Abbey
Party	Candidate	Votes	%	±%
Labour	G. S. Cargill	764	72.6	+7.3
Conservative	R. J. McFarlane	289	27.4	−7.3
Majority		475	45.1	
Turnout		1053	37.1	−9.3

Timmergreens and Carmyllie
Party	Candidate	Votes	%	±%
Labour	N. L. Geaughan	862	51.2	−3.6
Conservative	E. H. Milne	685	40.7	−4.5
Independent	J. Stewart	137	8.1	
Majority		177	10.5	+0.8
Turnout		1685	50.8	

Keptie
Party	Candidate	Votes	%	±%
Conservative	Helen Cargill	1,172	80.2	+8.0
Labour	J. M. Proctor	290	19.8	−8.0
Majority		882	60.4	+15.9
Turnout		1642	53.7	

Hayshead and St. Vigeans
Party	Candidate	Votes	%	±%
Conservative	R. D. Ramsay	735	50.1	−9.0
Labour	M. B. Kerr	636	43.3	+4.4
Liberal	D. G. Strachan	97	6.6	=6.6
Majority		99	6.8	−15.5
Turnout		1468	42.1	−0.2

Cliffburn
Party	Candidate	Votes	%	±%
Labour	A. F. Midwinter	672	65.4	+6.6
Conservative	R. Grieve	356	34.6	−6.6
Majority		316	30.8	+13.2
Turnout		1028	34.6	−0.5

Carnoustie West and Panmure
Party	Candidate	Votes	%	±%
Conservative	H. G. Morton	850	45.5	−15.7
SNP	D. Hood	801	42.9	+42.9
Labour	K. F. K. Browne	217	11.6	−5.9
Majority		49	2.6	
Turnout		1868	45.9	+4.1

Carnoustie East and Panbride
Party	Candidate	Votes	%	±%
Conservative	D. Torrie	1,173	62.3	−21.7
SNP	T. L. Blackwood	711	37.7	+37.7
Majority		462	24.6	−14.7
Turnout		1884	55.5	+3.3

Forfar West
Party	Candidate	Votes	%	±%
Conservative	I. Hutchison			
Majority				
Turnout				
Conservative gain from Independent		Swing		

Forfar South
Party	Candidate	Votes	%	±%
Conservative	H. MacPhail			
Majority				
Turnout				

Forfar North
Party	Candidate	Votes	%	±%
Conservative	R. Forrester			
Majority				
Turnout				
Conservative gain from Independent		Swing		

Montrose Central
Party	Candidate	Votes	%	±%
Independent	G. Norrie			
Majority				
Turnout				

Montrose North
Party	Candidate	Votes	%	±%
Independent	J. M. D. Smith	577	68.4	
Labour	F. Wood	267	31.6	
Majority		310	36.8	
Turnout				

Montrose South
Party	Candidate	Votes	%	±%
Independent	W. M. Philips			
Majority				
Turnout				

Kirriemuir
Party	Candidate	Votes	%	±%
Conservative	T. J. Millar		48.0	
Majority				
Turnout				

The Glens
Party	Candidate	Votes	%	±%
Conservative	Ms. R. Dundas	872	68.8	
SNP	C. Lawson	326	25.7	
Liberal	R. R. M. King	69	5.4	
Majority		546	43.1	
Turnout				

Strathbeg
Party	Candidate	Votes	%	±%
Conservative	A. C. Russell	859	62.5	
SNP	E. Carnegie	515	37.5	
Majority		344	25.0	−21.2
Turnout		1374	58.8	+5.3

Dean
Party	Candidate	Votes	%	±%
Conservative	M. Struthers	1,015	62.2	
SNP	K. Duncan	616	37.8	
Majority		399	24.4	
Turnout				
Conservative gain from Independent		Swing		

Northesk
Party	Candidate	Votes	%	±%
Independent	F. H. Millar			
Majority				
Turnout				

Southesk
Party	Candidate	Votes	%	±%
Independent	Ms. Isobel M. McLellan	672	62.4	−1.2
Independent	A. Nicholl	405	37.6	+1.2
Majority		267	24.8	−2.4
Turnout		1077	39.0	−11.8

Brechin North
Party	Candidate	Votes	%	±%
Independent	A. Buchan	873	65.7	
SNP	Ms. D. J. MacLeod	456	34.3	
Majority		417	31.4	
Turnout		1329	48.6	

Brechin South
Party	Candidate	Votes	%	±%
Independent	R. A. MacKenzie	594	60.6	−0.1
Labour	D. K. Todd	387	39.4	+0.1
Majority		207	21.2	−0.2
Turnout		981	38.5	−6.3
