= 1974 Sutherland District Council election =

Sutherland District Council election

7 May 1974	1977 →

All 12 seats to Sutherland District Council 7 seats needed for a majority
- Registered: 8,697
- Turnout: 74.6%
	First party
	Ind
Party	Independent
Seats won	12
Popular vote	4,008
Percentage	100.0%
Council Control after election
Independent

Elections to Sutherland District Council were held on 7 May 1974, on the same day as the other Scottish local government elections. This was the first election to the district council following the implementation of the Local Government (Scotland) Act 1973.

The election used 12 wards created by the Formation Electoral Arrangements in 1974. Each ward elected one councillor using first-past-the-post voting.

As with other elections in the Highland region, no candidates were affiliated with any political parties and the 12 councillors elected were all independents. In total, five of the 12 wards were uncontested.

== Background ==
Prior to 1974, Sutherland was one of 33 counties in Scotland. The area had been made a county following local government reforms in 1890 as a result of the Local Government (Scotland) Act 1889. Within Sutherland was the Royal Burgh of Dornoch which had existed in its own right since 1628 and had its own elected council which was separate from Sutherland County Council. Dornoch, as a small burgh, had powers over local taxation and building control as well as housing, lighting and drainage within the burgh. The county council had powers and responsibilities over roads, education, police, public health, social services and electoral registration as well as the registration of births, marriages and deaths for the whole county.

Following the recommendations in the Wheatly Report, the old system of counties and burghs – which had resulted in a mishmash of local government areas in which some small burghs had larger populations but far fewer responsibilities than some large burghs and even counties – was to be replaced by a new system of regional and district councils. Sutherland became a district council within the Highland region while Dornoch Burgh Council was abolished.

== Results ==
1974 Sutherland District Council election result
Party	Seats	Gains	Losses	Net gain/loss	Seats %	Votes %	Votes	+/−
Independent	12			N/A	100.0	100.0	4,008	N/A

== Ward results ==
=== Dornoch Burgh ===
Dornoch Burgh
Party	Candidate	Votes	%
Independent	H. Clunie	344	75.6
Independent	E. L. MacKay	111	24.4
Majority		233	51.2
Turnout		455	70.4
Registered electors		652	
Independent win (new seat)			

=== Dornoch East and West ===
Dornoch East and West
Party	Candidate	Votes	%
Independent	G. Fraser	Unopposed	
Registered electors		776	
Independent win (new seat)			

=== Creich East and West ===
Creich East and West
Party	Candidate	Votes	%
Independent	A. M. Gilmour	Unopposed	
Registered electors		827	
Independent win (new seat)			

=== Kincardine ===
Kincardine
Party	Candidate	Votes	%
Independent	G. S. Richardson	Unopposed	
Registered electors		512	
Independent win (new seat)			

=== Rogart and Golspie Rural ===
Rogart and Golspie Rural
Party	Candidate	Votes	%
Independent	C. C. D. Kinghorn	Unopposed	
Registered electors		611	
Independent win (new seat)			

=== Golspie Village ===
Golspie Village
Party	Candidate	Votes	%
Independent	D. I. MacRae	438	65.3
Independent	G. Beaton	122	18.2
Independent	J. W. Mowatt	111	16.5
Majority		316	47.1
Turnout		671	76.8
Registered electors		884	
Independent win (new seat)			

=== Lairg ===
Lairg
Party	Candidate	Votes	%
Independent	W. G. Johnston	292	60.3
Independent	N. G. MacDonald	192	39.7
Majority		100	20.6
Turnout		484	71.5
Registered electors		685	
Independent win (new seat)			

=== Assynt and Stoer ===
Assynt and Stoer
Party	Candidate	Votes	%
Independent	D. M. McBain	324	58.1
Independent	D. MacDonald	234	41.9
Majority		90	16.2
Turnout		558	88.2
Registered electors		650	
Independent win (new seat)			

=== Eddrachillis and Durness ===
Eddrachillis and Durness
Party	Candidate	Votes	%
Independent	L. MacKenzie	310	45.5
Independent	C. M. Campbell	174	25.6
Independent	J. C. Morrison	129	18.9
Independent	T. S. Sinclair	68	10.0
Majority		136	19.9
Turnout		681	82.2
Registered electors		837	
Independent win (new seat)			

=== Clyne ===
Clyne
Party	Candidate	Votes	%
Independent	W. Sutherland	454	66.9
Independent	H. Coghill	225	33.1
Majority		229	33.8
Turnout		679	70.3
Registered electors		979	
Independent win (new seat)			

=== Loth and Kildonan South ===
Loth and Kildonan South
Party	Candidate	Votes	%
Independent	R. R. MacDonald	275	57.3
Independent	J. M. MacGregor	205	42.7
Majority		70	14.6
Turnout		480	70.6
Registered electors		687	
Independent win (new seat)			

=== Kildonan North ===
Kildonan North
Party	Candidate	Votes	%
Independent	J. O. F. MacKay	Unopposed	
Registered electors		597	
Independent win (new seat)			
