= 1977 Sutherland District Council election =

Sutherland District Council election

← 1974	3 May 1977	1980 →

All 14 seats to Sutherland District Council 8 seats needed for a majority
- Registered: 10,352
- Turnout: 64.0%
	First party
	Ind
Party	Independent
Last election	12 seats, 100.0%
Seats won	14
Seat change	▲1 (Note: Amendments to the boundary with Caithness District Council resulted in one ward transferring from Caithness to Sutherland and new ward being created. As a result, there were two more seats on Sutherland District Council than the previous election. These seats resulted in an independent win and an independent gain from independent.)
Popular vote	2,989
Percentage	100.0%
Swing	Steady
Council Control before election
Independent
Council Control after election
Independent

Elections to Sutherland District Council were held on 3 May 1977, on the same day as the other Scottish local government elections. This was the second election to the district council following the local government reforms in 1974.

The election used the original 12 wards created by the Formation Electoral Arrangements in 1974 and two wards added to the district council due to boundary alterations between Sutherland and Caithness District Councils. Each ward elected one councillor using first-past-the-post voting.

As with other elections in the Highland region, no candidates were affiliated with any political parties and the 14 councillors elected were all independents. In total, nine of the 14 wards were uncontested.

== Background ==
Prior to the election, alterations were made to the area controlled by Sutherland and Caithness District Councils. An area in the west of Caithness including Tongue, Farr and Strathy was transferred to Sutherland. Before reorganisation in 1974, the area had been part of Sutherland County. As a result, the Tongue and Farr ward was transferred from Caithness and a new Strathy ward was created.

== Results ==
1977 Sutherland District Council election result
Party	Seats	Gains	Losses	Net gain/loss	Seats %	Votes %	Votes	+/−
Independent	14	8	7	▲1	100.0	100.0	2,989	Steady

== Ward results ==
=== Dornoch Burgh ===
Dornoch Burgh
Party	Candidate	Votes	%
Independent	D. S. Frier	Unopposed	
Registered electors		668	
Independent gain from Independent			

=== Dornoch East and West ===
Dornoch East and West
Party	Candidate	Votes	%
Independent	I. G. Munro	330	66.7
Independent	D. A. MacRae	97	19.6
Independent	R. K. Smith	68	13.7
Majority		233	47.1
Turnout		495	63.2
Registered electors		787	
Independent gain from Independent			

=== Creich East and West ===
Creich East and West
Party	Candidate	Votes	%
Independent	A. M. Gilmour	Unopposed	
Registered electors		849	
Independent hold			

=== Kincardine ===
Kincardine
Party	Candidate	Votes	%
Independent	E. M. A. Munro	Unopposed	
Registered electors		537	
Independent gain from Independent			

=== Rogart and Golspie Rural ===
Rogart and Golspie Rural
Party	Candidate	Votes	%
Independent	D. Gordon	211	54.0
Independent	C. C. D. Kinghorn	180	46.0
Majority		31	8.0
Turnout		391	63.6
Registered electors		616	
Independent gain from Independent			

=== Golspie Village ===
Golspie Village
Party	Candidate	Votes	%	±%
Independent	D. I. MacRae	391	60.9	▼4.4
Independent	K. F. MacLean	251	39.1	New
Majority		140	21.8	▼25.3
Turnout		642	66.5	▼10.3
Registered electors		965		
Independent hold		Swing	▼4.4	

=== Lairg ===
Lairg
Party	Candidate	Votes	%	±%
Independent	W. G. Johnston	266	62.9	▲2.6
Independent	N. G. MacDonald	157	37.1	▼2.6
Majority		109	25.8	▲5.2
Turnout		423	59.5	▼12.0
Registered electors		714		
Independent hold		Swing	▲2.6	

=== Assynt and Stoer ===
Assynt and Stoer
Party	Candidate	Votes	%
Independent	F. H. W. Matheson	Unopposed	
Registered electors		661	
Independent gain from Independent			

=== Eddrachillis and Durness ===
Eddrachillis and Durness
Party	Candidate	Votes	%
Independent	L. MacKenzie	Unopposed	
Registered electors		820	
Independent hold			

=== Clyne ===
Clyne
Party	Candidate	Votes	%	±%
Independent	R. MacLeod	424	70.9	New
Independent	W. Sutherland	174	29.1	▼37.8
Majority		250	41.8	N/A
Turnout		598	62.9	▼7.4
Registered electors		953		
Independent gain from Independent		Swing	▲54.3	

=== Loth and Kildonan South ===
Loth and Kildonan South
Party	Candidate	Votes	%	±%
Independent	R. R. MacDonald	228	51.8	▼5.5
Independent	I. MacKay	212	48.2	New
Majority		16	3.6	▼11.0
Turnout		440	68.4	▼2.2
Registered electors		646		
Independent hold		Swing	▼5.5	

=== Kildonan North ===
Kildonan North
Party	Candidate	Votes	%
Independent	J. O. F. MacKay	Unopposed	
Registered electors		712	
Independent hold			

=== Tongue and Farr ===
Tongue and Farr
Party	Candidate	Votes	%
Independent	K. S. B. Henderson	Unopposed	
Registered electors		867	
Independent gain from Independent			

=== Strathy ===
Strathy
Party	Candidate	Votes	%
Independent	E. B. M. Jardine	Unopposed	
Registered electors		557	
Independent win (new seat)			
