= 1977 Moray District Council election =

1977 Scottish local government election

- 3 May 1977

All 18 seats to Moray District Council 10 seats needed for a majority
- Turnout: 37.0%
	First party	Second party
Party	Independent	SNP
Last election	17 seats, 86.7%	1 seats, 8.3%
Seats won	15	3
Seat change	▼2	▲2
Popular vote	10,791	2,144
Percentage	78.0%	15.5%
Swing	▼8.7%	▲7.2%
- Council composition following the election

Elections to Moray District Council were held on 3 May 1977, on the same day as the other Scottish local government elections. This was the second election to the district council following the implementation of the Local Government (Scotland) Act 1973.

The election used the 18 wards created by the Formation Electoral Arrangements in 1974. Each ward elected one councillor using first-past-the-post voting.

== Background ==
At the previous election in 1974, the Independent group took 17 seats, to the Scottish National Party's (SNP) 1 seat.

1974 Moray District Council election result
Party	Seats	Vote share
Independent	17	86.7%
SNP	1	8.3%

== Results ==
1977 Moray District Council election result
Party	Seats	Gains	Losses	Net gain/loss	Seats %	Votes %	Votes	+/−
Independent	15	1	3	▼2	83.3	78.0	10,791	▼8.7
SNP	3	3	1	▲2	16.7	15.5	2,144	▲7.2
Liberal	0	0	0	Steady	0.0	3.6	501	New
Labour	0	0	0	Steady	0.0	2.9	400	▼2.1

== Ward results ==
=== Bishopmill ===
Party	Candidate	Votes	%
Independent	A Anderson (Incumbent)	529	66.4
Labour	W MacKenzie	292	35.6
Majority		237	28.8
Turnout		826	24.9
Independent gain from SNP			

=== Cathedral ===
Party	Candidate	Votes	%
Independent	J Russell (Incumbent)	522	60.4
Independent	D McColville	342	39.6
Majority		180	20.8
Turnout		869	27.9
Independent hold			

=== New Elgin ===
Party	Candidate	Votes	%
Independent	R Hossack (Incumbent)	966	89.9
Labour	F Curran	108	10.1
Majority		858	79.8
Turnout		1,074	34.6
Independent hold			

=== West Central ===
Party	Candidate	Votes	%
Independent	J Stephens	631	50.2
Independent	T McMillan (Incumbent)	627	49.8
Majority		4	0.4
Turnout		1,259	39.5
Independent hold			

=== Forres ===
Party	Candidate	Votes	%
Independent	A Forbes (Incumbent)	854	69.1
Independent	A Reid	382	30.9
Majority		472	38.2
Turnout		1,245	26.4
Independent hold			

=== Findhorn Valley ===
Party	Candidate	Votes	%
Independent	J Carr (Incumbent)	577	39.5
Liberal	W Anderson	501	34.3
SNP	L Munro	382	26.2
Majority		76	5.2
Turnout		1,461	41.5
Independent hold			

=== Laich ===
Party	Candidate	Votes	%
Independent	D Thompson (Incumbent)	Unopposed	
Independent hold			

=== Lossiemouth ===
Party	Candidate	Votes	%
Independent	J Taylor (Incumbent)	Unopposed	
Independent hold			

=== Heldon ===
Party	Candidate	Votes	%
Independent	J Anderson (Incumbent)	Unopposed	
Independent hold			

=== Innes ===
Party	Candidate	Votes	%
Independent	G Baxter (Incumbent)	Unopposed	
Independent hold			

=== Buckie West ===
Party	Candidate	Votes	%
SNP	H Munro	562	41.9
Independent	A Wilson	406	30.3
Independent	E Brown (Incumbent)	374	27.9
Majority		156	11.6
Turnout		1,351	43.8
SNP gain from Independent			

=== Buckie East ===
Party	Candidate	Votes	%
SNP	F Anderson	729	57.1
Independent	E Douglas (Incumbent)	548	42.9
Majority		181	14.2
Turnout		1,286	40.8
SNP gain from Independent			

=== Rathford ===
Party	Candidate	Votes	%
Independent	W Mair (Incumbent)	976	61.3
Independent	D Pirie	617	38.7
Majority		359	22.6
Turnout		1,595	42.1
Independent hold			

=== Lennox ===
Party	Candidate	Votes	%
SNP	T Howe	Unopposed	
SNP gain from Independent			

=== Keith ===
Party	Candidate	Votes	%
Independent	L Mann (Incumbent)	946	66.4
Independent	L Hall	478	33.6
Majority		468	32.8
Turnout		1,425	42.3
Independent hold			

=== Strathisla ===
Party	Candidate	Votes	%
Independent	P Watt	Unopposed	
Independent hold			

=== Speyside ===
Party	Candidate	Votes	%
Independent	E Aldridge (Incumbent)	1,016	68.3
SNP	P MacPherson	471	31.7
Majority		545	36.6
Turnout		1,491	48.0
Independent hold			

=== Glenlivet ===
Party	Candidate	Votes	%
Independent	W McKenzie (Incumbent)	Unopposed	
Independent hold			
