= 1977 Stewartry District Council election =

1977 Scottish local government election

← 1974	3 May 1977	1980 →

All 12 seats to Stewartry District Council 7 seats needed for a majority
	First party
Party	Independent
Last election	12 seats, 100.0%
Seats won	12
Seat change	Steady
Popular vote	6,682
Percentage	100.0%
Swing	Steady

Elections to Stewartry District Council were held on 3 May 1977, on the same day as the other Scottish local government elections. This was the second election to the district council following the implementation of the Local Government (Scotland) Act 1973.

The election used the 12 wards created by the Formation Electoral Arrangements in 1974. Each ward elected one councillor using first-past-the-post voting.

As in 1974, Stewartry remained a non-partisan district. No political party contested the election and all of the 12 seats were won by independents.

== Results ==
1977 Stewartry District Council election result
Party	Seats	Gains	Losses	Net gain/loss	Seats %	Votes %	Votes	+/−
Independent	12	0	0	Steady	100.0	100.0	6,682	Steady
