= 1977 Salop County Council election =

1977 UK local government election

← 1973	5 May 1977	1981 →

All 63 seats of Shropshire County Council 32 seats needed for a majority
	Majority party	Minority party	Third party
Party	Conservative	Independent	Labour
Seats before	12	31	16
Seats won	32	22	5
Seat change	▲20	▼9	▼11
- The County of Salop within England
Party before election
Conservative majority
Elected Party
Conservatives

Elections to Salop County Council were held on Thursday, 5 May 1977. The whole council of 63 members was up for election and the result was that the Independents lost control losing 9. The Conservatives gained 20 seats, ending as the largest political group with 32, while Labour lost eleven seats and the Liberals gained one, ending with five and four respectively.

== Election result ==
Result of Shropshire County Council election, 1977
Party	Seats	Gains	Losses	Net gain/loss	Seats %	Votes %	Votes	+/−
Independent	22		9	-9	34.0			
Conservative	32	20	0	+20	50.8			
Labour	5	0	8	-8	7.9			
Liberal	4	1	0	+1	6.3			
