= 1977 Stirling District Council election =

1977 Scottish local government election

← 1974	3 May 1977	1980 →

All 20 seats to Stirling District Council 11 seats needed for a majority
	First party	Second party
Party	Conservative	Labour
Last election	8 seats, 25.7%	7 seats, 33.0%
Seats won	8	7
Seat change	Steady	Steady
Popular vote	9,986	8,787
Percentage	32.0%	28.1%
Swing	▲6.3%	▼4.9%
	Third party	Fourth party
Party	SNP	Independent
Last election	4 seats, 30.4%	1 seat, 8.8%
Seats won	4	1
Seat change	Steady	Steady
Popular vote	10,561	1,739
Percentage	33.8%	5.6%
Swing	▲3.4%	▼3.2%

Elections to Stirling District Council were held on 3 May 1977, on the same day as the other Scottish local government elections. This was the second election to the district council following the implementation of the Local Government (Scotland) Act 1973.

The election used the 20 wards created by the Formation Electoral Arrangements in 1974. Each ward elected one councillor using first-past-the-post voting.

The council remained in no overall control following the election.

== Results ==
1977 Stirling District Council election result
Party	Seats	Gains	Losses	Net gain/loss	Seats %	Votes %	Votes	+/−
Conservative	8	0	0	Steady	40.0	32.0	9,986	▲6.3
Labour	7	0	0	Steady	35.0	28.1	8,787	▼4.9
SNP	4	0	0	Steady	20.0	33.8	10,562	▲3.4
Independent	1	0	0	Steady	5.0	5.6	1,739	▼3.2
Liberal	0	0	0	Steady	0.0	0.5	158	▼0.8
