= 1977 Nithsdale District Council election =

1977 Scottish local government election

← 1974	3 May 1977	1980 →

All 28 seats to Nithsdale District Council 15 seats needed for a majority
	First party	Second party	Third party
Party	Independent	SNP	Labour
Last election	20 seats, 52.9%	1 seat, 0.8%	5 seats, 19.6%
Seats won	20	4	4
Seat change	Steady	▲3	▼1
Popular vote	7,210	1,989	1,281
Percentage	68.8%	19.0%	12.2%
Swing	▲15.9%	▲18.2%	▼7.4%

Elections to Nithsdale District Council were held on 3 May 1977, on the same day as the other Scottish local government elections. This was the second election to the district council following the implementation of the Local Government (Scotland) Act 1973.

The election used the 28 wards created by the Formation Electoral Arrangements in 1974. Each ward elected one councillor using first-past-the-post voting.

Independent candidates retained control of the council after winning a majority.

== Results ==
1977 Nithsdale District Council election result
Party	Seats	Gains	Losses	Net gain/loss	Seats %	Votes %	Votes	+/−
Independent	20			Steady	71.4	68.8	7,210	▲15.9
SNP	4			▲3	14.3	19.0	1,989	▲18.2
Labour	4			▼1	14.3	12.2	1,281	▼7.4
