= 1977 Devon County Council election =

1977 UK local government election

← 1973	5 May 1977	1981 →
Party	Conservative	Independent	Labour
- The County of Devon within England
Party before election
Conservative
Elected Party
Conservative

Elections to Devon County Council were held on Thursday, 5 May 1977. The whole council of ninety-eight members was up for election and the result was that the Conservatives comfortably retained their control, winning eighty-five seats, a gain of twenty-eight, of which seventeen were from Labour and eight from the Liberals. Labour ended with only three county councillors, the Liberals with two, and eight Independents were elected, down from eleven.

== Election result ==
Result of Devon County Council election, 1977
Party	Seats	Gains	Losses	Net gain/loss	Seats %	Votes %	Votes	+/−
Conservative	85	28	0	+28	86.7			
Independent	8	0	3	-3	8.2			
Labour	3	0	17	-17	3.1			
Liberal	2	0	8	-8	2.0			
