= 1977 Surrey County Council election =

1977 UK local government election

← 1973	5 May 1977	1981 →

All 73 seats of Surrey County Council 63 seats needed for a majority
	Majority party	Minority party	Third party
Party	Conservative	Independent	Labour
Seats won	68	3	2
Seat change	▲21	▼2	▼10
- The County of Surrey within England
Party before election
Conservative
Elected Party
Conservative

Elections to Surrey County Council were held on Thursday, 5 May 1977. The whole council of 73 members was up for election and the result was that the Conservatives comfortably retained their control, winning 68 seats, gaining ten from Labour, nine from the Liberals (who lost all their seats), and two from Independents. Labour ended with only two county councillors and the Independents with three, including one who stood as a "Resident" and another who stood as a "Ratepayer".

== Election result ==
Result of Surrey County Council election, 1977
Party	Seats	Gains	Losses	Net gain/loss	Seats %	Votes %	Votes	+/−
Conservative	68	21	0	+21	93.2			
Independent	3	0	2	-2	4.1			
Labour	2	0	10	-10	2.7			
Liberal	0	0	9	-9	0.0			
