= 1977 Motherwell District Council election =

1977 Scottish local government election

- 3 May 1977

All 29 seats to Motherwell District Council 15 seats needed for a majority
	First party	Second party	Third party
Party	Labour	Conservative	SNP
Last election	27seats, 56.7%	1 seat, 17.4%	0 seats, 9.1%
Seats won	19	5	3
Seat change	▼8	▲4	▲3
Popular vote	26,602	11,042	11,866
Percentage	49.2%	20.4%	21.9%
Swing	▼7.5%	▲3.0%	▲12.8%
	Fourth party	Fifth party
Party	Communist	Liberal
Last election	0 seats, 3.9%	1 seat, 5.6%
Seats won	1	1
Seat change	▲1	Steady
Popular vote	1,197	1,096
Percentage	2.2%	2.0%
Swing	▼1.7%	▼3.6%

Elections to Motherwell District Council were held on 3 May 1977, on the same day as the other Scottish local government elections. This was the second election to the district council following the implementation of the Local Government (Scotland) Act 1973.

Labour took control of the council after winning a majority. The party took 27 of the 30 seats and more than half of the popular vote. The Conservatives and the Liberals both won one seat and one independent candidate was elected.

== Results ==
1977 Motherwell District Council election result
Party	Seats	Gains	Losses	Net gain/loss	Seats %	Votes %	Votes	+/−
Labour	19			▼8	65.5	49.2	26,602	▼7.5
Conservative	5			▲4	17.2	20.4	11,042	▲3.0
SNP	3			▲3	10.3	21.9	11,866	▲12.8
Communist	1			▲1	3.4	2.2	1,197	▼1.7
Liberal	1			Steady	3.4	2.0	1,096	▼3.6
Independent	0			▼1	0.0	1.7	942	▼3.8
Conservative Ratepayer	0			Steady	0.0	1.5	804	New
Christian Socialist	0			Steady	0.0	1.0	557	New
