= 1977 Oxfordshire County Council election =

Oxfordshire '77 elections

← 1973	5 May 1977	1981 →
Party	Conservative	Independent	Labour
- The County of Oxfordshire within England
Party before election
Conservative
Elected Party
Conservative

Elections to Oxfordshire County Council were held on Thursday, 5 May 1977, when the whole council of sixty-nine members was up for election.

The result was that the Conservatives retained their control, winning sixty-one seats, a gain of eight. Labour ended with only three county councillors, a loss of seventeen, Independents also held three, a loss of six, while the Liberals held the two seats they had had.

== Election result ==
Result of Oxfordshire County Council election, 1977
Party	Seats	Gains	Losses	Net gain/loss	Seats %	Votes %	Votes	+/−
Conservative	61	23	0	+23	88.4			
Labour	3	0	17	-17	4.3			
Independent	3	0	6	-6	4.3			
Liberal	2	0	0	0	2.9			
