= 1977 Perth and Kinross District Council election =

1977 Scottish local government election

← 1974	3 May 1977	1980 →

All 29 seats to Perth and Kinross District Council 15 seats needed for a majority
	First party	Second party
Party	Conservative	Independent
Last election	16 seats, 46.6%	9 seats, 33.3%
Seats won	19	5
Seat change	▲3	▼4
Popular vote	13,923	2,803
Percentage	53.2%	10.7%
Swing	▲6.6%	▼22.6%
	Third party	Fourth party
Party	Labour	SNP
Last election	4 seats, 13.2%	0 seats, 4.7%
Seats won	3	2
Seat change	▼1	▲2
Popular vote	4,228	4,408
Percentage	16.1%	16.8%
Swing	▲2.9%	▲12.1%

Elections to Perth and Kinross District Council were held on 3 May 1977, on the same day as the other Scottish local government elections. This was the second election to the district council following the implementation of the Local Government (Scotland) Act 1973.

The election used the 29 wards created by the Formation Electoral Arrangements in 1974. Each ward elected one councillor using first-past-the-post voting.

The Conservatives retained control of the council after winning a majority.

== Results ==
1977 Perth and Kinross District Council election result
Party	Seats	Gains	Losses	Net gain/loss	Seats %	Votes %	Votes	+/−
Conservative	19			▲3	65.5	53.2	13,923	▲6.6
Independent	5			▼4	17.2	10.7	2,803	▼22.6
Labour	3			▼1	10.3	16.1	4,228	▲2.9
SNP	2			▲2	6.9	16.8	4,408	▲12.1
Liberal	0			Steady	0.0	3.2	833	▲0.9
