= 1977 Ettrick and Lauderdale District Council election =

1977 Scottish local government election

← 1974	3 May 1977	1980 →

All 16 seats to Ettrick and Lauderdale District Council 9 seats needed for a majority
	First party	Second party	Third party
Party	Independent	Liberal	Conservative
Last election	14 seats, 88.9%	Did not contest	1 seats, 4.2%
Seats won	14	1	1
Seat change	Steady	▲1	Steady
Popular vote	6,011	361	0
Percentage	83.1%	5.0%	0.0%
Swing	▼5.8%	New	▼4.2%

Elections to Ettrick and Lauderdale District Council were held on 3 May 1977, on the same day as the other Scottish local government elections. This was the second election to the district council following the implementation of the Local Government (Scotland) Act 1973.

The election used the 16 wards created by the Formation Electoral Arrangements in 1974. Each ward elected one councillor using first-past-the-post voting.

Independent candidates retained control of the council after winning a majority.

== Results ==
1977 Ettrick and Lauderdale District Council election result
Party	Seats	Gains	Losses	Net gain/loss	Seats %	Votes %	Votes	+/−
Independent	14			Steady	87.5	83.1	6,011	▼5.8
Liberal	1			▲1	6.3	5.0	361	New
Conservative	1			Steady	6.3	0.0	0	▼4.2
Labour	0			▼1	0.0	10.0	724	▲3.1
SNP	0			Steady	0.0	1.9	135	New
