= 1977 Dunfermline District Council election =

1977 Scottish local government election

| ← 1974 | 3 May 1977 | 1980 → |

All 30 seats to Dunfermline District Council 16 seats needed for a majority
| | First party | Second party |
|---|---|---|
| Party | Labour | Conservative |
| Last election | 19 seats, 42.7% | 6 seats, 16.9% |
| Seats won | 19 | 7 |
| Seat change | Steady | ▲1 |
| Popular vote | 18,565 | 12,149 |
| Percentage | 43.3% | 28.3% |
| Swing | ▲0.6% | ▲11.4% |
| | Third party | Fourth party |
| Party | SNP | Independent |
| Last election | 2 seats, 15.2% | 2 seat, 8.0% |
| Seats won | 2 | 2 |
| Seat change | Steady | Steady |
| Popular vote | 5,556 | 2,456 |
| Percentage | 12.9% | 5.7% |
| Swing | ▼2.3% | ▼2.3% |

Elections to Dunfermline District Council were held on 3 May 1977, on the same day as the other Scottish local government elections. This was the second election to the district council following the implementation of the Local Government (Scotland) Act 1973.

The election used the 30 wards created by the Formation Electoral Arrangements in 1974. Each ward elected one councillor using first-past-the-post voting.

The Labour Party retained control of the council after winning a majority.

== Results ==
1977 Dunfermline District Council election result
| Party | Seats | Gains | Losses | Net gain/loss | Seats % | Votes % | Votes | +/− |
|---|---|---|---|---|---|---|---|---|
| Labour | 19 | | | Steady | 63.3 | 43.3 | 18,565 | ▲0.6 |
| Conservative | 7 | | | ▲1 | 23.3 | 28.3 | 12,149 | ▲11.4 |
| SNP | 2 | | | Steady | 6.7 | 12.9 | 5,556 | ▼2.3 |
| Independent | 2 | | | Steady | 6.7 | 5.7 | 2,456 | ▼2.3 |
| Communist | 0 | | | Steady | 0.0 | 5.8 | 2,495 | ▼3.3 |
| Residents | 0 | | | Steady | 0.0 | 2.6 | 1,095 | ▲0.2 |
| Liberal | 0 | | | ▼1 | 0.0 | 1.2 | 523 | ▼1.5 |
| Independent Nationalist | 0 | | | Steady | 0.0 | 0.2 | 76 | New |
