= Scottish Labour Party (1976) =

- Leader: Jim Sillars
- Founder: Jim Sillars; John Robertson; Alex Neil
- Founded: 18 January 1976
- Dissolved: 1981
- Split from: Labour Party
- Merged into: Scottish National Party
- Newspaper: Forward Scotland
- Ideology: Scottish nationalism Democratic socialism
- Political position: Left-wing

The Scottish Labour Party (SLP) was a socialist party in Scotland that was active between 1976 and 1981. It formed as a breakaway from the UK Labour Party. It won three council seats in 1977 but lost its MPs at the 1979 election and was dissolved two years later.

== History ==
The party formed on 18 January 1976 as a breakaway from the UK Labour Party, by members disaffected with the then Labour Government's failure to secure a devolved Scottish Assembly, as well as with its social and economic agenda. The formation of the SLP was led by Jim Sillars, then MP for South Ayrshire, John Robertson, then MP for Paisley, and Alex Neil, the UK Labour Party's senior Scottish researcher. The split came just before the resignation of Harold Wilson as prime minister and party leader and the election of James Callaghan as his successor.

Within a few weeks of its formation, The Glasgow Herald reported that a System Three opinion poll showed the party was taking a quarter of the Labour Party's electoral support in Scotland. The same poll also gave the SLP a higher share of support in Scotland (8%) than the well-established Liberal Party (6%). Neil was reported to be "staggered and delighted by this wonderful result" and warned that SLP could expect to make gains in areas of urban deprivation in the west of Scotland that usually supported Labour.

Almost immediately the SLP became the focus for entryism from the International Marxist Group (IMG), and at the party's first congress in October 1976 the IMG was expelled, along with a number of branches whose members were not associated with the IMG. According to Henry Drucker's account, the IMG's role was rather limited; Sillars used this as an excuse for purging anyone he did not see entirely eye-to-eye with or who represented a significant threat to his leadership. The expellees formed a rival Scottish Labour Party (Democratic Wing), and this in turn later renamed itself the Scottish Socialist League (SSL). Gradually, those members of the SSL who had not been associated with the IMG drifted out, and the SSL was reabsorbed into the Trotskyist Fourth International.

The SLP had little electoral success, winning only three council seats at the 1977 local elections. (Note: The party officially stood 35 candidates at that election, while the breakaway SSL stood a further 12 candidates (winning no seats) and a renegade group in Dundee that had applied unsuccessfully to join the SLP in May 1976 stood three candidates in the city under the party's name (also winning no seats). The three council seats won by the SLP were: Whitecrook ward in Clydebank district (where the candidate was the sitting councillor, who had defected from the Scottish National Party); Old Cumnock Parish ward in Cumnock and Doon Valley district; and Patna and Dalrymple ward, Alex Neil's birthplace, also in Cumnock and Doon Valley. See H. M. Drucker, Breakaway: The Scottish Labour Party (Edinburgh: EUSPB, 1978), pp. 130-1; J. M. Bochel; D. T. Denver. "The Scottish District Elections 1977: Results and Statistics" (PDF). pp. 62, 79, 92.) The party polled only 583 votes in the Garscadden by-election in 1978. At the 1979 general election, the SLP fought three seats, including Sillars's attempt at being re-elected (Robertson chose to step down). Sillars came close to retaining his seat in South Ayrshire, but this was clearly a personal vote built up over the years he had already served as an MP, as the other two candidates – standing in Paisley and Edinburgh Central respectively – polled very poorly indeed.

This failure prompted the SLP to disband in 1981; and members either fell out of active politics, re-joined the Labour Party, or chose to join the Scottish National Party (SNP), which both Sillars and Neil did, with both rising to high office in the SNP.

The SLP adventure is generally looked upon as an ambitious failure, but Sillars has himself put this down to a lack of planning before the decision to launch the party. Unlike the SLP, the Social Democratic Party (SDP) meticulously planned their breakaway from the Labour Party, and were much more successful. Sillars has claimed that the SLP did at least provide a forerunner to the SNP's later dialogue with the left.

== Membership ==
Although the SLP was initially reported (usually by the party's leaders) to have as many as 2,000 to 3,000 members, Drucker later estimated that numbers had actually peaked at 883 in October 1976, the same month that the party split in two. This figure disguised a strong imbalance in favour of Sillars's Ayrshire fiefdom, with 276 members (nearly one-third of the total) recorded as being represented by that county's delegation to the party's 1976 congress. Thus a highly unusual situation emerged whereby branches in small Ayrshire villages such as Patna and Ochiltree reported membership numbers higher than those for the cities of Aberdeen and Stirling.

The SLP did, however, contain a number of committed activists who would later go on to achieve a name for themselves as mainstream politicians, including John McAllion, who became MP and then MSP for Dundee East; Maria Fyfe, one time MP for Glasgow Maryhill; Sheila Gilmore, later MP for Edinburgh East; and Charlie Gordon, future leader of Glasgow City Council and MSP for Glasgow Cathcart. These individuals all chose to join (or in some cases re-join) the Labour Party rather than follow Sillars into the SNP.

Also involved as members of the SLP were:

- Neal Ascherson
- Chris Bambery
- Colin Boyd, Baron Boyd of Duncansby
- George Kerevan
- Tom Nairn
- Danus Skene

Neal Ascherson was the Scottish political correspondent for The Scotsman at this time, and was the most prominent example of a curious phenomenon that distinguished the party from its rivals: namely, the relatively high proportion of journalists on its membership roll. Other leading figures from the Scottish press who joined the SLP were Bob Brown of The Times (who was the party's first chairman), Stewart MacLachlan and Ruth Wishart of the Daily Record, James Fyfe (husband of Maria) of the Glasgow Herald, and James Frame of the Edinburgh Evening News. Chris Baur, Scottish political correspondent for both the BBC and the Financial Times, was a sympathiser who was consulted by the others, but did not join the party.

== Electoral performance ==
Election	Vote No.	Vote %	Seats	Seat ±%	Outcome of election
1977 Scottish local elections			3 / 1,107	Steady	
1978 Scottish regional elections	6,629	0.4%	0 / 431	Steady	
1979 United Kingdom general election	13,737	0.5%	0 / 71	▼2	Conservative victory

== See also ==
- Scottish Workers Republican Party
- Scottish Labour Party (1994–present), modern party that is the UK Labour Party's devolved Scotland administrative subdivision.
- List of Labour Party breakaway parties (UK)

== Bibliography ==
- H. M. Drucker, Breakaway: The Scottish Labour Party (Edinburgh: EUSPB, 1978).
- Ben Jackson, The Case for Scottish Independence: A History of Nationalist Political Thought in Modern Scotland (Cambridge: Cambridge University Press, 2020).
