= 1977 Scottish local elections =

- 3 May 1977

All 53 district councils
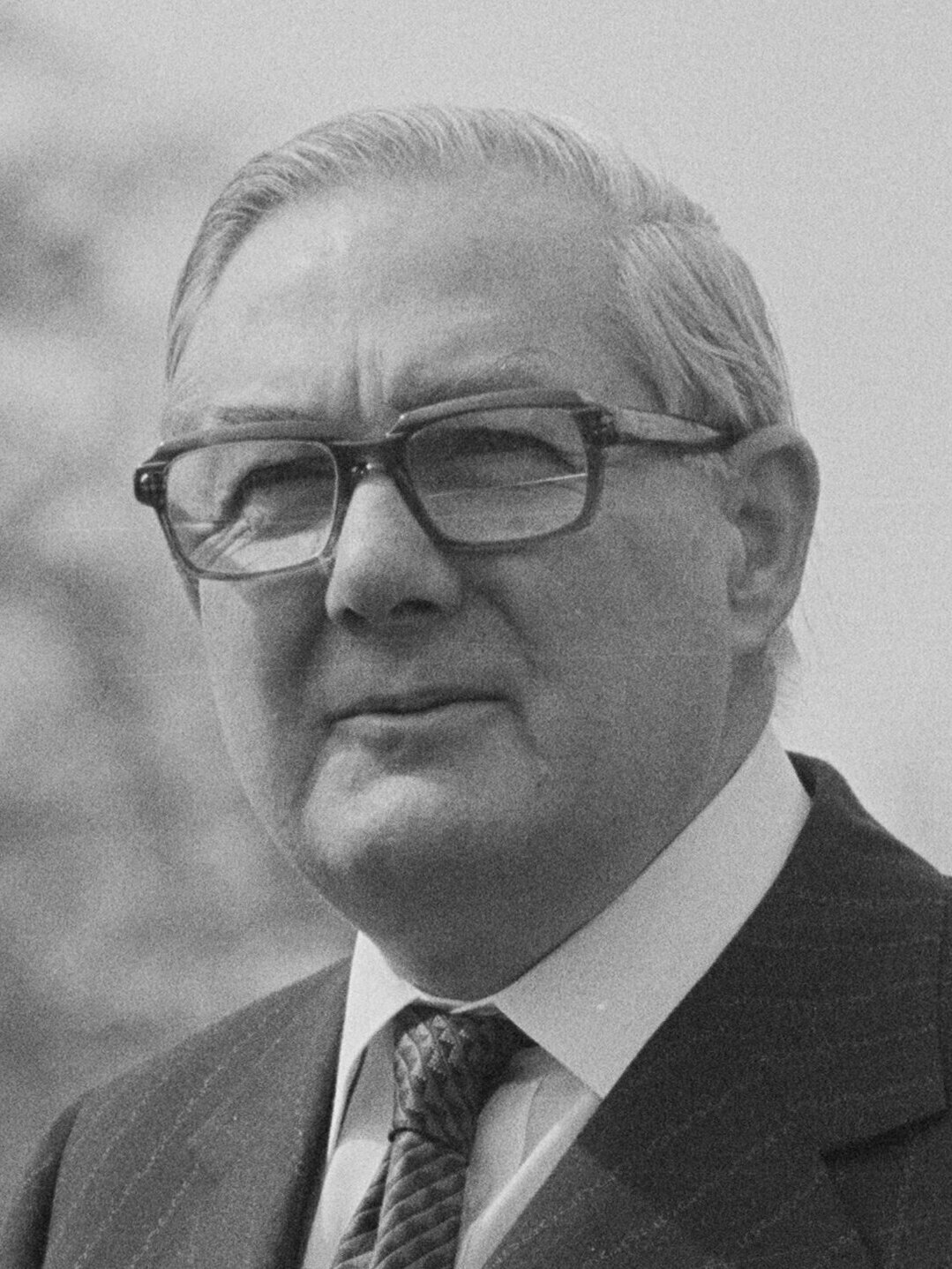

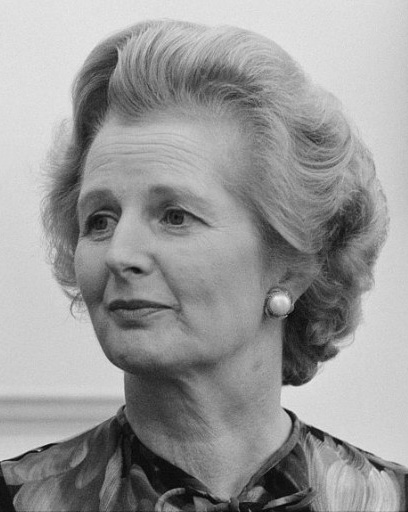

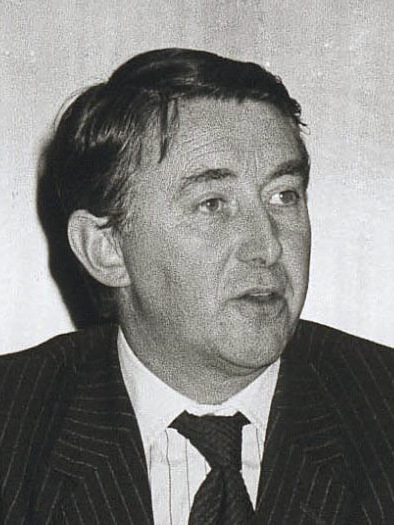
	First party	Second party
Leader	James Callaghan	Margaret Thatcher
Party	Labour	Conservative
Leader since	5 April 1976	11 February 1975
Seats won	282	259
Seat change	▼146	▲18
Percentage	31.6%	27.2%
Swing	▼6.8%	▲0.4%
	Third party	Fourth party
Leader	William Wolfe	David Steel
Party	SNP	Liberal
Leader since	1969	7 July 1976
Seats won	170	62
Seat change	▲108	▲45
Percentage	24.2%	4.0%
Swing	▲11.8%	▼1.0%
- Colours denote the winning party with outright control

Elections for the Scottish district councils were held in 1977.

These were the second elections held to the 53 district councils established by the Local Government (Scotland) Act 1973. The previous elections had been held in 1974 with the authorities acting as "shadow" councils until May 1975. The elections took place when the Labour government of James Callaghan was extremely unpopular, with a subsequent collapse in the party's vote.

== Background ==
The poll was held on 3 May and all district council seats were to be filled. Districts formed the second tier in local government in Scotland under the 1975 reorganisation, with regional councils forming the upper tier. It was intended that elections would normally take place on a four-year cycle, but as an interim measure the first two sets of district councils had terms of three years: 1974–77 and 1977–80. Regional elections were also to be on a four-year cycle, held midway between district elections.

== Party performance ==
There was a large swing against Labour, who lost control of a number of councils in the industrial Central Belt where it had dominated local politics for decades. Labour lost its majority in Glasgow for the next three years (although they were still the largest party), very unusual in the late 20th century, with some high-profile casualties including the Labour group leader on the council, Dick Dynes. While they lost seats to the Scottish National Party in Glasgow and the industrial belt, the anti-Labour mood favoured the Conservatives in Edinburgh and the Liberals in Aberdeen and Inverclyde.

In retrospect these elections were the high point of the SNP's upsurge in the 1970s. Vice-chair Margo MacDonald predicted that they would make 100 net gains, but they only made 98 (winning 103, losing 5). Even so, this left half of Scotland under hung councils. They retained control of the council they held and gained three more. The party claimed to have secured a swing of approximately 9% since the October 1974 general election, meaning they would gain 21–27 parliamentary seats from the Labour Party, three from the Conservatives and one from the Liberal Party. Independent analysis placed the swing to the SNP of between 1 and 5 percent, giving them gains of 10–15 Labour seats and only a slight chance of making gains from the Conservatives or Liberals. In particular, the party did poorly in Nairn, putting the seat of prominent party figure Winnie Ewing at risk (she lost the seat at the next election in 1979). The SNP's advance was halted the following year, with the 1978 Glasgow Garscadden by-election, 1978 Scottish regional elections, the 1978 Hamilton by-election and the 1978 Berwick and East Lothian by-election.

This election was also the first serious test of the new Scottish Labour Party of Jim Sillars which did not do well outside his South Ayrshire base, only winning three seats.

== National results ==
Summary of the 1977 Scottish District local council election results
Parties	Votes	Votes %	Wards
Labour	285,899	31.6	282
Conservative	215,817	27.2	259
SNP	236,913	24.2	170
Independent	150,736	9.8	318
Liberal	29,214	4.0	62
SLP			3
Communist	6,133	0.7	2
Other	35,595	2.6	17
Total		100.0	1,107

== Results by region ==
The seats on each council before and after the election were as follows:

=== Borders ===
District	Labour	Conservative	Liberal	Independent	Other	Control
Berwickshire	0	11 (+1)	0	1 (−1)	0	Conservative hold
Ettrick and Lauderdale	0 (−1)	0	1 (+1)	14	0	Independent hold
Roxburgh	1 (+1)	1 (+1)	2 (+2)	9 (−4)	Border Independents 3	Independent hold
Tweeddale	0	0	0	10	0	Independent hold

=== Central ===
District	Labour	Conservative	SNP	Liberal	Independent	Other	Control
Clackmannan	3 (−2)	1	8 (+3)	0	0	Scottish Labour 0 (−1)	SNP gain from NOC
Falkirk	8 (−8)	2	22 (+10)	0	2 (−1)	Independent Labour 1 Non-Party 1 (−1)	SNP gain from NOC
Stirling	7	8	4	0	1	0	NOC

=== Dumfries and Galloway ===
District	Labour	Conservative	SNP	Independent	Other	Control
Annandale and Eskdale	0	0	0	14	0	Independent hold
Nithsdale	4 (−2)	0 (−1)	4 (+3)	14 (−3)	Non-Party 6 (+1)	Independent hold
Stewartry	0	0	0	12	0	Independent hold
Wigtown	0	0	0	14	0	Independent hold

=== Fife ===
District	Labour	Conservative	SNP	Liberal	Independent	Other	Control
Dunfermline	19 (+2)	7 (+2)	2 (−1)	0 (−1)	2 (−2)	0	Labour hold
Kirkcaldy	16 (−8)	5	8 (+8)	0	2	Ratepayers 4 Communist 1	Labour lose to NOC
North-East Fife	0	14 (+1)	0	1 (+1)	3 (−2)	0	Conservative hold

=== Grampian ===
District	Labour	Conservative	SNP	Liberal	Independent	Control
Banff and Buchan	0	0	1 (+1)	0	17 (−1)	Independent hold
City of Aberdeen	22 (−6)	17	2 (+2)	7 (+4)	0	Labour lose to NOC
Gordon	0	3	0	2	7	Independent hold
Kincardine and Deeside	0	2	0	0	10	Independent hold
Moray	0	0	4 (+4)	0	14 (−4)	Independent hold

=== Highland ===
District	Labour	SNP	Independent	Control
Badenoch and Strathspey	0	0	10	Independent hold
Caithness	0	0	15	Independent hold
Inverness	0	0	15	Independent hold
Lochaber 2 vacancies	3	1 (+1)	6 (−1)	Independent hold
Nairn	0	2 (−1)	8 (+1)	Independent hold
Ross and Cromarty	0	0	20	Independent hold
Skye and Lochalsh	0	0	10	Independent hold
Sutherland	0	0	14	Independent hold

=== Lothian ===
District	Labour	Conservative	SNP	Liberal	Independent	Control
City of Edinburgh	23 (−4)	34 (+3)	5 (+3)	1 (−2)	1	Conservative gain from NOC
East Lothian	9 (−1)	8 (+2)	0	0	0 (−1)	Labour hold
Midlothian	7 (−4)	2	5 (+4)	0	1	Labour lose to NOC
West Lothian	9 (−1)	0	9 (+1)	0	3	NOC

=== Strathclyde ===
District	Labour	Conservative	SNP	Liberal	Independent	Others	Control
Argyll and Bute 1 vacancy	0	2 (+2)	0	0	23 (−2)	0	Independent hold
Bearsden and Milngavie	1	6 (+1)	0	0	3 (−1)	0	Conservative gain from NOC
Clydebank	3 (−2)	1	5 (+2)	0	0	Scottish Labour 1	SNP gain from Labour
Cumbernauld and Kilsyth	3	0	7	0	0	0	SNP hold
Cumnock and Doon Valley	6 (−4)	1 (+1)	0	0	1	Scottish Labour 2 (+2)	Labour hold
Cunninghame	5 (−9)	0	11 (+10)	0	0 (−2)	Moderate Conservatives 8 (+1)	Labour lose to NOC
Dumbarton	3 (−5)	5 (+3)	4 (+4)	0	3 (−2)	0	Labour lose to NOC
East Kilbride	1 (−4)	2	11 (+4)	0	1	0	SNP gain from NOC
Eastwood	0	10	0	0	0	Ratepayers 2	Conservative hold
City of Glasgow	30 (−24)	25 (+9)	16 (+15)	1 (+1)	0	Independent Conservative 0 (−1)	Labour lose to NOC
Hamilton	10 (−3)	1 (−1)	6 (+4)	2	0 (−1)	Independent Labour 1 (+1)	Labour hold
Inverclyde	8 (−6)	1 (−1)	1 (+1)	13 (+7)	0 (−1)	0	Liberal gain from Labour
Kilmarnock and Loudoun	7 (−5)	7 (+3)	2 (+2)	0	0	0	Labour lose to NOC
Kyle and Carrick	7 (−3)	17 (+2)	2 (+2)	1 (+1)	0	0	Conservative hold
Lanark	4	0	3 (+1)	0	7 (−1)	0	Independent lose to NOC
Motherwell	20 (−5)	5 (+4)	3 (+1)	1	0 (−1)	Communist 1 (+1)	Labour hold
Monklands	13 (−2)	5 (+1)	2 (+1)	0	1	0	Labour hold
Renfrew	14 (-11)	11 (+1)	11 (+10)	0	3	Independent Labour 1 (+1)	Labour lose to NOC
Strathkelvin	4 (−2)	4 (−1)	6 (+3)	0	0	0	NOC

=== Tayside ===
District	Labour	Conservative	SNP	Independent	Others	Control
Angus	3	12 (+1)	0	7 (−1)	0	Conservative hold
City of Dundee	20 (−2)	21 (+1)	0	1 (−1)	Real Labour 1 Monifeith Ratepayers 1 (+1)	NOC
Perth and Kinross	3 (−1)	19	2 (+2)	5 (−1)	0	Conservative hold
