= 1974 Argyll District Council election =

Argyll District Council election

7 May 1974	1977 →

All 26 seats to Cunninghame District Council 14 seats needed for a majority
	First party	Second party
	Ind	Con
Party	Independent	Conservative
Seats won	21	5
Popular vote	15,710	4,610
Percentage	65.2%	19.1%
Council Leader after election
Independent

Elections to Argyll District Council were held on 7 May 1974, on the same day as the other Scottish local government elections. This was the first election to the district council following the implementation of the Local Government (Scotland) Act 1973.

The election used the 26 wards created by the Formation Electoral Arrangements in 1974. Each ward elected one councillor using first-past-the-post voting.

Independent candidates took control of the council after winning a majority – 21 – of the seats. Argyll was considered an intermediate district in terms of its partisanship as 80 per cent of councillors were not affiliated to a political party. The remaining five seats were won by the Conservatives.

== Background ==
Prior to 1974, the area that was to become Argyll, was split between two counties – the County of Argyll and the County of Bute. Within that were all six burghs of the County of Argyll (Campbeltown, Dunoon, Inveraray, Lochgilphead, Oban and Tobermory) and one of the two burghs of the County of Bute (Rothesay). These were all small burghs so the burgh councils had limited powers which included some control over planning as well as local taxation, building control, housing, lighting and drainage with the rest of the local government responsibility falling to the county council.

Following the recommendations in the Wheatly Report, the old system of counties and burghs – which had resulted in a mishmash of local government areas in which some small burghs had larger populations but far fewer responsibilities than some large burghs and even counties – was to be replaced by a new system of regional and district councils. The Local Government (Scotland) Act 1973 implemented most of the recommendations in the Wheatly Report. The vast majority of the former County of Argyll – only excluding the landward area of Ardnamurchan – which included the six burghs was combined with the Isle of Bute from the County of Bute and was placed into the Argyll district within the Strathclyde region.

== Election results ==
1974 Argyll District Council election result
Party	Seats	Gains	Losses	Net gain/loss	Seats %	Votes %	Votes	+/−
Independent	21			N/A		65.2	15,710	N/A
Conservative	5			N/A		19.1	4,610	N/A
Labour	0			N/A	0.0	11.9	2,870	N/A
SNP	0			N/A	0.0	3.8	919	N/A

== Aftermath ==
Argull was the only non-partisan district in Strathclyde and was controlled by Independent candidates who won all 21 of the 26 seats. The remaining five seats were won by the Conservatives. Labour won control of the regional council which held its first election on the same day. Across Scotland, Labour won the most votes, the most seats and the most councils of any party.
