= 1974 Cumbernauld District Council election =

Cumbernauld District Council election

7 May 1974	1977 →

All 10 seats to Cumbernauld District Council 6 seats needed for a majority
	First party	Second party
Party	SNP	Labour
Seats won	7	3
Popular vote	9,229	8,442
Percentage	49.7%	45.5%

Elections to Cumbernauld District Council were held on 7 May 1974, on the same day as the other Scottish local government elections. This was the first election to the district council following the implementation of the Local Government (Scotland) Act 1973.

The election used the 10 wards created by the Formation Electoral Arrangements in 1974. Each ward elected one councillor using first-past-the-post voting.

The Scottish National Party took control of the council following the election. The party won seven of the 10 seats and almost half the popular vote. The remaining three seats were won by Labour.

== Background ==
Prior to 1974, the area that was to become Cumbernauld, was split between two counties – the County of Dunbarton and the County of Stirling. Within that was one of the eight burghs of the County of Dunbarton (Cumbernauld) and one of the six burghs of the County of Stirling (Kilsyth). These were both small burghs so the burgh council had limited powers which included some control over planning as well as local taxation, building control, housing, lighting and drainage with the rest of the local government responsibility falling to the county council.

Following the recommendations in the Wheatly Report, the old system of counties and burghs – which had resulted in a mishmash of local government areas in which some small burghs had larger populations but far fewer responsibilities than some large burghs and even counties – was to be replaced by a new system of regional and district councils. The Local Government (Scotland) Act 1973 implemented most of the recommendations in the Wheatly Report. The historic County of Dunbarton was separated into two areas with part of the City of Glasgow and the County of Lanark in between. The eastern part of the eastern area – which included the burgh of Cumbernauld – was combined with an area in southern Stirlingshire – which included the burgh of Kilsyth – and was placed into the Cumbernauld district within the Strathclyde region.

== Results ==
1974 Cumbernauld District Council election result
Party	Seats	Gains	Losses	Net gain/loss	Seats %	Votes %	Votes	+/−
SNP	7			N/A	70.0	49.7	9,229	N/A
Labour	3			N/A	30.0	45.5	8,442	N/A
Independent	0			N/A	0.0	4.4	809	N/A
Communist	0			N/A	0.0	0.5	89	N/A

== Aftermath ==
Cumbernauld was the only district in the newly created Strathclyde region that was controlled by the Scottish National Party (SNP) who took seven seats. Labour was the second-largest party after winning the other three seats. Labour won control of the regional council which held its first election on the same day. Across Scotland, Labour won the most votes, the most seats and the most councils of any party.
