= 1974 Inverclyde District Council election =

Inverclyde District Council election

7 May 1974	1977 →

All 23 seats to Inverclyde District Council 12 seats needed for a majority
	First party	Second party
Party	Labour	Liberal
Seats won	15	4
Popular vote	16,362	13,722
Percentage	44.7%	37.5%
	Third party	Fourth party
Party	Conservative	Independent
Seats won	3	1
Popular vote	5,273	1,167
Percentage	14.4%	3.2%

Elections to Inverclyde District Council were held on 7 May 1974, on the same day as the other Scottish local government elections. This was the first election to the district council following the implementation of the Local Government (Scotland) Act 1973.

The election used the 23 wards created by the Formation Electoral Arrangements in 1974. Each ward elected one councillor using first-past-the-post voting.

Labour took control of the council after winning a majority. The party took 15 of the 23 seats and more than 40% of the popular vote. The Liberals were the second-largest party after taking four seats and the Conservatives won three seats.

== Background ==
Prior to 1974, the area that was to become Inverclyde contained three of the seven burghs of the County of Renfrew. The small burgh of Gourock had limited powers which included some control over planning as well as local taxation, building control, housing, lighting and drainage. The large burghs of Greenock and Port Glasgow had further powers over the police, public health, social services, registration of births, marriages and deaths and electoral registration. The rest of the local government responsibility fell to the county council which had full control over the areas which were not within a burgh.

Following the recommendations in the Wheatly Report, the old system of counties and burghs – which had resulted in a mishmash of local government areas in which some small burghs had larger populations but far fewer responsibilities than some large burghs and even counties – was to be replaced by a new system of regional and district councils. The Local Government (Scotland) Act 1973 implemented most of the recommendations in the Wheatly Report. The western part of the County of Renfrew which included the three burghs was placed into the Inverclyde district within the Strathclyde region.

== Results ==
1974 Inverclyde District Council election result
Party	Seats	Gains	Losses	Net gain/loss	Seats %	Votes %	Votes	+/−
Labour	15			N/A	65.2	44.7	16,362	N/A
Liberal	4			N/A	17.4	37.5	13,722	N/A
Conservative	3			N/A	13.0	14.4	5,273	N/A
Independent	1			N/A	4.3	3.2	1,167	N/A
Communist	0			N/A	0.0	0.2	77	N/A

== Aftermath ==
Inverclyde was one of 11 districts in the newly created Strathclyde region that was won by Labour after the party took 15 of the 23 seats. The Liberals were the second-largest party after they won four seats. The Conservatives took three seats and one Independent candidate was elected. Labour also won control of the regional council which held its first election on the same day. Across Scotland, Labour won the most votes, the most seats and the most councils of any party.
