= Cumbernauld and Kilsyth (district) =

Former local government district in Scotland

Coordinates: 55.960°N 4.019°W

Cumbernauld and Kilsyth District Council
- District
- Council Logo
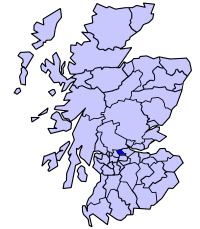
- Cumbernauld and Kilsyth district within Scotland
- Population
  - 1991: 62,412
- History
  - Created: 16 May 1975
  - Abolished: 31 March 1996
  - Succeeded by: (Part of) North Lanarkshire
- Status: District
- Government: Cumbernauld and Kilsyth District Council
  - HQ: Cumbernauld

Cumbernauld and Kilsyth was one of nineteen local government districts in the Strathclyde region of Scotland between 1975 and 1996.

== History ==
The district was created in 1975 under the Local Government (Scotland) Act 1973, which established a two-tier structure of local government across mainland Scotland comprising upper-tier regions and lower-tier districts. Cumbernauld and Kilsyth was one of nineteen districts created within the region of Strathclyde. The district covered parts of four former districts from the historic counties of Dunbartonshire and Stirlingshire, all of which were abolished at the same time:

- From Dunbartonshire:
  - Cumbernauld Burgh
  - Kirkintilloch and Cumbernauld District (Croy and Dullatur electoral division and part of Twechar and Waterside electoral division within designated area of Cumbernauld New Town)
- From Stirlingshire:
  - Kilsyth Burgh
  - Central No.2 district (Kilsyth West electoral division and Banton polling district from Kilsyth East electoral division)

The 1973 Act gave the new district the name "Cumbernauld". The shadow council elected in 1974 to oversee the transition to the new system requested a change of name to "Cumbernauld and Kilsyth", which was approved by the government before the new district came into being.

The district was abolished in 1996 under the Local Government etc. (Scotland) Act 1994 which replaced regions and districts with unitary council areas. North Lanarkshire council area was formed covering the abolished districts of Cumbernauld and Kilsyth, Monklands, Motherwell, and the Chryston area of Strathkelvin district.

Cumbernauld and Kilsyth remains a constituency of the Scottish Parliament and was formerly a constituency of the House of Commons.

== Political control ==
The first election to the district council was held in 1974, initially operating as a shadow authority alongside the outgoing authorities until it came into its powers on 16 May 1975. Political control of the council from 1975 was as follows:

Party in control	Years
SNP	1975–1980
Labour	1980–1988
No overall control	1988–1992
Labour	1992–1996

== Premises ==
The council established its headquarters at a new building called Council Offices on Bron Way in the centre of Cumbernauld. Since the council's abolition in 1996 the building has been known as Bron Chambers and used as additional offices of North Lanarkshire Council.

== See also ==
- 1974 Cumbernauld District Council election
- 1977 Cumbernauld and Kilsyth District Council election
- 1980 Cumbernauld and Kilsyth District Council election
- 1984 Cumbernauld and Kilsyth District Council election
- 1988 Cumbernauld and Kilsyth District Council election
- 1992 Cumbernauld and Kilsyth District Council election
- Subdivisions of Scotland
