= 1982 Strathclyde Regional Council election =

Strathclyde Regional Council election

| ← 1978 | 6 May 1982 | 1986 → |

All 103 seats to Strathclyde Regional Council 52 seats needed for a majority
| | First party | Second party | Third party |
|---|---|---|---|
| | Lab | Con | Lib |
| Leader | Dick Stewart | Leonard Turpie |
| Party | Labour | Conservative | Liberal |
| Last election | 72 seats, 43.0% | 25 seats, 30.0% | 2 seats, 1.8% |
| Seats won | 79 | 15 | 4 |
| Seat change | ▲7 | ▼10 | ▲2 |
| Popular vote | 340,118 | 166,910 | 70,238 |
| Percentage | 45.8% | 22.5% | 9.5% |
| Swing | ▲2.8% | ▼7.5% | ▼7.7% |
- Result of the election
Council Leader before election
Dick Stewart
Labour
Council Leader after election
Dick Stewart
Labour

Elections to Strathclyde Regional Council were held on Thursday 6 May 1982, on the same day as the eight other Scottish regional elections. This was the third election to the regional council following the local government reforms in the 1970s.

The election was the first to use the 103 electoral divisions created by the Initial Reviews of Electoral Arrangements in 1978. Each electoral division elected one councillor using first-past-the-post voting.

Labour, who had won every previous election to Strathclyde Regional Council, retained a large majority by winning 79 of the 103 seats – up seven from the previous election in 1978. The Conservatives remained as the second largest party despite their vote share falling by 7.5%. The party won 15 seats, 10 fewer than in the previous election. The Liberal Party doubled their representation on the regional council after winning four seats. Despite coming third in the popular vote, the Scottish National Party (SNP) were the fourth-largest party on the regional council after they gained only one seat to hold three. The remaining two seats were won by independent candidates.

The Liberal Party and the Social Democratic Party (SDP) contested this election as a political alliance in which only one of the two parties would stand a candidate in any given seat.

The Conservative group leader, Leonard Turpie, lost his seat to the SDP-Liberal Alliance. They also lost the adjoining seat to Labour. Both seats were contained within the Glasgow Hillhead constituency won in March by SDP figure Roy Jenkins.

Following the election, there was an attempt to unseat the incumbent leader of Strathclyde Regional Council Dick Stewart, who had held the position since the council's creation. He was challenged for the leadership by his longtime friend and colleague Charles Gray at the first meeting of the Labour group following the election. The attempt however failed, with Stewart retaining the leadership with 40 votes to Gray's 38.

== Results ==
1982 Strathclyde Regional Council election
| Party | Seats | Gains | Losses | Net gain/loss | Seats % | Votes % | Votes | +/− |
|---|---|---|---|---|---|---|---|---|
| Labour | 79 | | | ▲6 | 76.7 | 45.8 | 340,118 | ▲2.8 |
| Conservative | 15 | | | ▼10 | 14.6 | 22.5 | 166,910 | ▼7.5 |
| Liberal | 4 | | | ▲2 | 3.9 | 17.8 | 70,238 | ▲16.1 |
| SNP | 3 | | | ▲1 | 2.9 | 12.5 | 92,927 | ▼10.0 |
| Independent | 2 | | | ▲1 | 1.9 | 1.6 | 12,204 | ▲0.9 |
| SDP | 0 | | | 0 | 0.0 | 7.6 | 56,470 | New |
| Communist | 0 | | | 0 | 0.0 | 0.3 | 2,165 | 0.0 |
| Ecology | 0 | | | 0 | 0.0 | | 569 | New |
| Protest Campaign Against the Papal Visit | 0 | | | 0 | 0.0 | | 534 | New |
| Independent Labour | 0 | | | 0 | 0.0 | | 402 | |
| Workers Revolutionary | 0 | | | 0 | 0.0 | | 205 | |
| Twentieth Century Reformation Movement | 0 | | | 0 | 0.0 | | 136 | New |
| Total | 103 | | | | | | 742,878 | |

== Electoral division results ==
=== Argyll and Bute ===
Kintyre
| Party | Candidate | Votes | % |
|---|---|---|---|
| Conservative | J. McCorkindale | 2,444 | 65.6 |
| Labour | D. McMillan | 1,274 | 34.2 |
| Majority | | 1,170 | 31.4 |
| Turnout | | 3,718 | 43.4 |
| Conservative hold | | | |

Mid-Argyll/Islay
| Party | Candidate | Votes | % |
|---|---|---|---|
| SNP | N. MacNeil | 2,635 | 60.0 |
| Conservative | J. Mackie | 1,396 | 28.2 |
| Ecology | C. Gladstone | 352 | 8.0 |
| Majority | | 1,240 | 31.4 |
| Turnout | | 4,383 | 42.3 |
| SNP hold | | | |

Lorn and Mull
| Party | Candidate | Votes | % |
|---|---|---|---|
| Conservative | D. Webster | Unopposed | |
| Conservative hold | | | |

Bute/West Cowal
| Party | Candidate | Votes | % |
|---|---|---|---|
| Conservative | J. McMillan | 2,292 | 55.1 |
| SNP | R. Strong | 1,232 | 29.6 |
| Labour | M. McGrorarty | 624 | 15.0 |
| Majority | | 1,060 | 25.6 |
| Turnout | | 4,148 | 49.8 |
| Conservative hold | | | |

Dunoon/East Cowal
| Party | Candidate | Votes | % |
|---|---|---|---|
| Independent | J. Walsh | 1,318 | 29.8 |
| Conservative | J. A. Douglas | 1,121 | 25.3 |
| Independent | J. MacKinnon | 603 | 13.6 |
| Independent | M. Murton | 469 | 10.6 |
| Liberal | A. Lyall | 456 | 10.3 |
| Labour | J. Cullen | 456 | 10.3 |
| Majority | | 197 | 4.5 |
| Turnout | | 4,423 | 49.4 |
| Independent gain from Liberal | | | |

=== Dumbarton ===
Dumbarton
| Party | Candidate | Votes | % |
|---|---|---|---|
| Labour | I. MacDonald | 3,751 | 44.5 |
| Liberal | J. Murricane | 2,178 | 25.9 |
| Conservative | R. Graham | 1,632 | 19.4 |
| SNP | G. Clarkson | 851 | 10.1 |
| Majority | | 1,573 | 18.6 |
| Turnout | | 8,412 | 45.2 |

Helensburgh
| Party | Candidate | Votes | % |
|---|---|---|---|
| Independent | W. Petrie | 6,735 | 73.5 |
| SDP | R. Sawyer | 1,337 | 14.6 |
| Labour | J. Carleton | 609 | 6.6 |
| SNP | J. B. Cowey | 465 | 5.1 |
| Majority | | 5,398 | 58.9 |
| Turnout | | 9,146 | 50.4 |
| Independent hold | | | |

Vale of Leven
| Party | Candidate | Votes | % |
|---|---|---|---|
| Labour | D. Mills | 6,181 | 62.0 |
| SNP | N. McEwan | 1,609 | 16.1 |
| Conservative | P. Grant | 1,250 | 12.5 |
| Communist | J. Bollan | 496 | 5.0 |
| Independent Labour | G. Muir | 402 | 4.0 |
| Majority | | 4,572 | 45.9 |
| Turnout | | 9,938 | 48.9 |
| Labour hold | | | |

Drumry/Summerhill
| Party | Candidate | Votes | % |
|---|---|---|---|
| Labour | A. McLean | 3,460 | 63.5 |
| SNP | T. Humble | 1,445 | 26.5 |
| Conservative | D. Gibson | 436 | 8.0 |
| Communist | A. Jackson | 96 | 1.8 |
| Majority | | 2,015 | 37.0 |
| Turnout | | 5,437 | 35.0 |
| Labour hold | | | |

=== Glasgow ===
Blairdarrie/Knightscliffe
| Party | Candidate | Votes | % |
|---|---|---|---|
| Labour | J. W. MacKechnie | 3,253 | 46.2 |
| SDP | G. Beattie | 1,521 | 21.6 |
| Conservative | C. A. Lawson | 1,340 | 19.1 |
| SNP | J. Ruddy | 912 | 13.0 |
| Majority | | 1,732 | 24.6 |
| Turnout | | 7,026 | 40.0 |
| Labour hold | | | |

Yoker/Knightswood
| Party | Candidate | Votes | % |
|---|---|---|---|
| Labour | W. Perry | 4,175 | 62.1 |
| Conservative | E. Ledgewood | 1,211 | 18.0 |
| SNP | J. Lang | 1,203 | 17.9 |
| Communist | J. Moffat | 117 | 1.7 |
| Majority | | 2,964 | 44.1 |
| Turnout | | 6,706 | 37.2 |
| Labour hold | | | |

Scotstoun/Broomhill
| Party | Candidate | Votes | % |
|---|---|---|---|
| Labour | K. Murray | 2,835 | 32.5 |
| SDP | C. Ainsworth | 2,385 | 27.4 |
| Conservative | L. M. Rosin | 2,227 | 25.6 |
| SNP | W. Lindsay Jnr. | 1,141 | 13.1 |
| Communist | L. D. Bain | 124 | 1.4 |
| Majority | | 450 | 5.1 |
| Turnout | | 8,712 | 45.7 |

Kelvinside/Kelvindale
| Party | Candidate | Votes | % |
|---|---|---|---|
| Liberal | C. M. Mason | 3,833 | 40.7 |
| Conservative | L. MacK Turpie | 3,809 | 40.5 |
| Labour | C. F. Rushton | 1,223 | 13.0 |
| SNP | P. D. Johnson | 435 | 4.6 |
| Ecology | A. Whitelaw | 104 | 1.1 |
| Majority | | 24 | 0.2 |
| Turnout | | 9,404 | 47.7 |
| Liberal gain from Conservative | | | |

=== Kilmarnock North ===
Kilmarnock North
| Party | Candidate | Votes | % | ±% |
|---|---|---|---|---|
| Labour | J. Hunter | 4,707 | 62.0 | ▲9.6 |
| Liberal | W. George | 1,697 | 22.4 | New |
| SNP | G. Gibson | 984 | 13.0 | ▼14.5 |
| Twentieth Century Reformation Movement | J. Sloan | 136 | 1.8 | New |
| Majority | | 3,010 | 39.6 | ▲14.7 |
| Turnout | | 7,524 | 39.7 | ▼8.4 |
| Registered electors | | 19,125 | | |
| Labour hold | | Swing | ▲12.0 | |

=== Kilmarnock South ===
Kilmarnock South
| Party | Candidate | Votes | % | ±% |
|---|---|---|---|---|
| Labour | R. Carson | 3,894 | 45.4 | ▲6.4 |
| Conservative | A. McCluskey | 1,904 | 22.2 | ▼9.5 |
| SDP | G. Gunn | 1,804 | 21.0 | New |
| SNP | T. Kennaugh | 956 | 11.2 | ▼17.9 |
| Majority | | 1,990 | 23.2 | ▲16.9 |
| Turnout | | 8,558 | 41.5 | ▼4.6 |
| Registered electors | | 20,634 | | |
| Labour hold | | Swing | ▲7.9 | |

=== Stewarton and Irvine Valley ===
Stewarton and Irvine Valley
| Party | Candidate | Votes | % | ±% |
|---|---|---|---|---|
| Labour | D. Fulton | 4,321 | 46.3 | ▲3.5 |
| Conservative | A. MacDougall | 2,345 | 25.1 | ▼4.2 |
| Liberal | A. Dick | 1,638 | 17.5 | New |
| SNP | A. Young | 1,022 | 10.9 | ▼16.9 |
| Majority | | 1,976 | 21.2 | ▲7.7 |
| Turnout | | 9,326 | 44.3 | ▼6.9 |
| Registered electors | | 21,054 | | |
| Labour hold | | Swing | ▲3.8 | |

=== Cumnock ===
Cumnock
| Party | Candidate | Votes | % | ±% |
|---|---|---|---|---|
| Labour | J. Boyd | 4,430 | 68.0 | ▲16.1 |
| SNP | R. Esquierdo | 812 | 12.5 | ▲2.1 |
| Conservative | N. Martin | 706 | 10.8 | ▼1.8 |
| SDP | M. Dwan | 551 | 8.5 | New |
| Majority | | 3,618 | 55.5 | ▲28.5 |
| Turnout | | 6,499 | 39.8 | ▼6.3 |
| Registered electors | | 16,347 | | |
| Labour hold | | Swing | ▲20.5 | |

=== New Cumnock and Doon Valley ===
New Cumnock and Doon Valley
| Party | Candidate | Votes | % | ±% |
|---|---|---|---|---|
| Labour | W. Goudie | 4,147 | 59.2 | ▲10.9 |
| SDP | M. Ali | 1,975 | 28.2 | New |
| Conservative | P. Richards | 871 | 12.4 | ▼2.0 |
| Majority | | 2,172 | 31.0 | ▲19.8 |
| Turnout | | 6,993 | 41.1 | ▼6.0 |
| Registered electors | | 17,034 | | |
| Labour hold | | Swing | ▲24.0 | |
