= 1986 Strathclyde Regional Council election =

Strathclyde Regional Council election

← 1982	8 May 1986	1990 →

All 103 seats to Strathclyde Regional Council 52 seats needed for a majority
	First party	Second party	Third party
	Lab	Con	Lib
Leader	Charles Gray
Party	Labour	Conservative	Liberal
Last election	79 seats, 48.5%	15 seats, 22.5%	4 seats, 9.5%
Seats won	87	6	5
Seat change	▲8	▼9	▲1
Popular vote	429,026	106,983	61,143
Percentage	52.6%	13.1%	7.5%
Swing	▲4.1%	▼9.4%	▼2.0%
- Result of the election
Council Leader before election
Dick Stewart
Labour
Council Leader after election
Charles Gray
Labour

Elections to Strathclyde Regional Council were held on Thursday 8 May 1986, on the same day as the eight other Scottish regional elections. This was the fourth election to the regional council following the local government reforms in the 1970s.

The election used the 103 electoral divisions created by the Initial Reviews of Electoral Arrangements in 1978. Each electoral division elected one councillor using first-past-the-post voting.

Labour, who had won every previous election to Strathclyde Regional Council, retained a large majority by winning 87 of the 103 seats – up eight from the previous election in 1982. The Conservatives remained as the second largest party despite losing more than half of their seats. The party won six seats – down from 15 in 1982 – as their vote share fell by almost 10%. The Liberal Party increased their representation on the regional council by one after winning five seats. This would be the last Strathclyde Regional Council election contested by the Liberal Party which merged with Social Democratic Party (SDP) to form the Liberal Democrats in 1988. Despite coming second in the popular vote and increasing their vote share to 17.5%, the Scottish National Party (SNP) retained only two of their three seats. The remaining three seats were won by independent candidates.

The Liberal Party and the SDP contested this election as a political alliance in which only one of the two parties would stand a candidate in any given seat.

== Results ==
1986 Strathclyde Regional Council election
Party	Seats	Gains	Losses	Net gain/loss	Seats %	Votes %	Votes	+/−
Labour	87	9	1	▲8	85.4	52.6	429,046	▲6.8
Conservative	6	0	9	▼9	5.8	13.1	106,983	▼9.4
Liberal	5	2	1	▲1	4.9	7.5	61,143	▼2.0
Independent	3	1	0	▲1	2.9	1.9	15,890	▲0.2
SNP	2	2	3	▼1	1.9	17.5	143,033	▲5.0
SDP	0	0	0	0	0.0	6.7	55,039	▼0.9
Independent Labour	0	0	0	0	0.0	0.3	2,211	▲0.2
Green	0	0	0	0	0.0	0.2	1,810	▲0.1
Communist	0	0	0	0	0.0	0.3	975	▼0.2
Scottish Independence Party	0	0	0	0	0.0	0.0	169	New
Revolutionary Communist	0	0	0	0	0.0	0.0	74	New
Total	103						816,373	

== Electoral division results ==
=== Kilmarnock North ===
Kilmarnock North
Party	Candidate	Votes	%	±%
SNP	D. Coffey	3,408	34.8	▲21.8
Labour	J. Steven	3,373	34.4	▼27.6
Independent Labour	J. Hunter	1,098	11.2	New
SDP	M. Temple	1,005	10.3	New
Conservative	G. Woodford	838	8.6	New
Twentieth Century Reformation Movement	J. Sloan	67	0.7	▼1.1
Majority		35	0.4	N/A
Turnout		9,789	49.3	▲9.6
Registered electors		19,877		
SNP gain from Labour		Swing	▲24.7	

=== Kilmarnock South ===
Kilmarnock South
Party	Candidate	Votes	%	±%
Labour	R. Carson	4,389	50.4	▲5.0
SNP	J. Robertson	1,781	20.5	▲9.3
Conservative	T. Whale	1,477	17.0	▼5.2
SDP	A. Hambly	1,045	12.0	▼9.0
Majority		2,608	29.9	▲6.7
Turnout		8,692	43.0	▲1.5
Registered electors		20,259		
Labour hold		Swing	▲5.1	

=== Stewarton and Irvine Valley ===
Stewarton and Irvine Valley
Party	Candidate	Votes	%	±%
Labour	D. Fulton	5,157	55.2	▲8.9
Conservative	A. MacDougall	1,651	17.7	▼7.4
SNP	F. Cramond	1,493	16.0	▲5.1
SDP	R. Beeby	1,038	11.1	New
Majority		3,506	37.5	▲16.7
Turnout		9,339	42.4	▼2.0
Registered electors		22,036		
Labour hold		Swing	▲8.1	

=== Cumnock ===
Cumnock
Party	Candidate	Votes	%	±%
Labour	J. Boyd	5,633	84.1	▲16.1
SNP	C. Alston	1,036	15.5	▲3.0
Majority		4,597	68.6	▲13.1
Turnout		6,669	40.6	▲0.8
Registered electors		16,489		
Labour hold		Swing	▲6.5	

=== New Cumnock and Doon Valley ===
New Cumnock and Doon Valley
Party	Candidate	Votes	%	±%
Labour	T. Farrell	5,020	68.8	▲8.9
SNP	S. Patterson	812	11.1	New
SDP	G. McCracken	748	10.2	▼18.0
Conservative	M. Littlejohn	706	9.7	▼2.7
Majority		4,208	57.7	▲26.7
Turnout		7,286	42.8	▲1.7
Registered electors		17,046		
Labour hold		Swing	▲13.4	
