= 1990 Strathclyde Regional Council election =

Strathclyde Regional Council election

← 1986	3 May 1990	1994 →

All 103 seats to Strathclyde Regional Council 52 seats needed for a majority
	First party	Second party	Third party
	Lab	Con	LD
Leader	Charles Gray
Party	Labour	Conservative	Liberal Democrats
Last election	87 seats, 52.6%	6 seats, 13.1%	N/A
Seats won	90	5	4
Seat change	▲3	▼1	▲4
Popular vote	409,905	127,827	46,356
Percentage	52.2%	16.3%	5.9%
Swing	▼0.4%	▲3.2%	▼8.3%
- Result of the election

Council Leader before election
Charles Gray
Labour
Council Leader after election
Charles Gray
Labour

Elections to Strathclyde Regional Council were held on Thursday 3 May 1990, on the same day as the eight other Scottish regional elections. This was the fifth election to the regional council following the local government reforms in the 1970s.

The election was the last to use the 103 electoral divisions created by the Initial Reviews of Electoral Arrangements in 1978. Each electoral division elected one councillor using first-past-the-post voting.

Labour, who had won every previous election to Strathclyde Regional Council, retained a large majority by winning 90 of the 103 seats – up three from the previous election in 1986 despite their vote share falling by 0.4%. The Conservatives remained as the second largest party by retaining five of their six seats. The Liberal Democrats contested their first election in Strathclyde following the merger of the Liberal Party and the Social Democratic Party (SDP) in 1988. The new party won four of the five seats that the Liberal Party had won in the 1986 election but with less than half vote share of its predecessors. The Liberal Party and the SDP had contested the previous election in a political alliance. Despite coming second in the popular vote and increasing their vote share to more than 20%, the Scottish National Party (SNP) retained only one of their two seats. The remaining three seats were won by independent candidates.

== Results ==
1990 Strathclyde Regional Council election
Party	Seats	Gains	Losses	Net gain/loss	Seats %	Votes %	Votes	+/−
Labour	90	3	0	▲3	87.4	52.2	409,905	▼0.4
Conservative	5	0	1	▼1	4.9	16.3	127,827	▲3.2
Liberal Democrats	4	0	1	▼1	3.9	5.9	46,356	▼8.3
Independent	3	0	0	Steady	2.9	2.0	15,553	▲0.1
SNP	1	0	1	▼1	1.0	21.2	166,468	▲3.7
Scottish Green	0	0	0	Steady	0.0	2.0	15,517	▲1.8
Other	0	0	0	Steady	0.0	0.5	3,875	▲1.8
Total	103						784,636	

== Electoral division results ==
1990 Strathclyde Regional Council election
Electoral division		Councillor	Result
1	Kintyre	G. McMillan	Labour hold
2	Mid Argyll/Islay	C. MacIntyre	Liberal Democrats hold
3	Lorn/Mull	I. Bell	SNP hold
4	Bute/West Cowal	J. McMillan	Independent hold
5	Dunoon/East Cowal	J. Walsh	Independent hold
6	Dumbarton	I. Macdonald	Labour hold
7	Helensburgh	W. Petrie	Independent hold
8	Vale of Leven	D. Mills	Labour hold
9	Drumry/Summerhill	C. Gordon	Labour hold
10	Blairdardie/Knightscliffe	J. W. Mackechnie	Labour hold
11	Yoker/Knightswood	W. Perry	Labour hold
12	Scotstoun/Broomhill	K. J. Murray	Labour hold
13	Kelvindale/Kelvinside	C. M. Mason	Liberal Democrats hold
14	Summerston/Maryhill	N. Bakshi	Labour hold
15	Milton/Ruchill	G. McGrath	Labour hold
16	North Kelvin/Park	J. Gray	Labour hold
17	Partick/Anderston	M. Green	Labour hold
18	Springburn/Robroyston	M. Beckett	Labour hold
19	Keppochhill/Cowlairs	W. Harley	Labour hold
20	Alexandra Parade/Dennistoun	D. Fleming	Labour hold
21	Central/Calton	A. McLean	Labour hold
22	Belvedere/Carntyne	J. McKenzie	Labour hold
23	Parkhead/Shettleston	D. Laing	Labour hold
24	Lethamhill/Riddrie	R. Marshall	Labour hold
25	Queenslie/Barlanark	A. J. Long	Labour hold
26	Mount Vernon/Ballieston	D. Hay	Labour hold
27	Gartloch/Easterhouse	A. Viola	Labour hold
28	Drumoyne/Govan	I. G. Davidson	Labour hold
29	Penilee/Cardonald	J. F. McLean	Labour hold
30	Mosspark/Bellahouston	H. McElhorne	Labour hold
31	Crookston/Cowglen	W. M. Timoney	Labour hold
32	South Nithill/Arden	W. O'Rourke	Labour hold
33	Pollokshields/Shawlands	M. Millar	Labour hold
34	Kingston/Hutchesontown	S. McCartney	Labour hold
35	Queen's Park/Crosshill	W. R. McLennan	Labour hold
36	Pollokshaws/Newlands	G. Carroll	Labour hold
37	King's Park/Aikenhead	B. Millar	Labour hold
38	Toryglen/Rutherglen	E. Thompson	Labour hold
39	Linn Park/Castlemilk	H. Walker	Labour hold
40	Glenwood/Fernwood	N. Toppin	Labour hold
41	Cambuslang/Halfway	A. McGowan	Labour hold
42	Clydebank/Kilpatrick South	M. Turner	Labour hold
43	Clydebank/Kilpatrick West	D. McNulty	Labour hold
44	Milngavie/Kilmardinny	K. Moodie	Liberal Democrats hold
45	Bearsden	J. Bannerman	Liberal Democrats hold
46	Kirkintilloch	S. Gilmore	Labour hold
47	Bishopbriggs	T. Rae	Labour hold
48	Chryston/Kelvin Valley	C. Gray	Labour hold
49	Cumbernauld North	B. McCulloch	Labour hold
50	Cumbernauld South	G. McElroy	Labour hold
51	Kilsyth/Condorrat	T. Barrie	Labour hold
52	Coatbridge North	J. Murphy	Labour hold
53	Coatbridge South	J. Martin	Labour hold
54	Airdrie East	J. McGuigan	Labour hold
55	Airdrie South & West	J. Donnelly	Labour hold
56	Chapelhall/Salsburgh	P. Donnelly	Labour hold
57	Dalziel	B. M. Scott	Labour hold
58	Wishaw	J. Gibson	Labour hold
59	Clydevale	W. Irvine	Labour hold
60	Fortissat	J. Burns	Labour hold
61	Bellshill/Tannochside	C. Hebenton	Labour hold
62	Clydesdale	J. Reddin	Labour hold
67	Calderwood/St Leonard's	A. Maggs	Labour hold
68	Westwood/Mains	D. M. Sanderson	Labour hold
69	Murray/Avondale	P. Watters	Labour hold
70	Eastwood North	C. E. Lyon	Conservative hold
71	Eastwood South	I. Drysdale	Conservative hold
72	Lanark/Lesmahagow	M. Smith	Labour hold
73	Tinto	A. Lawson	Labour hold
74	Carluke	J. Robinson	Labour hold
75	Paisley Craigielea	H. Revie	Labour hold
76	Paisley Gleniffer	J. McDowell	Labour hold
77	Paisley Central	J. Mullin	Labour hold
78	Paisley Abercorn	G. Grant	Labour hold
79	Barrhead	J. McGuire	Labour hold
80	Johnstone	A. Ferguson	Labour hold
81	Renfrew	R. McGurty	Labour hold
82	Gryffe	R. Gould	Labour hold
83	Argarran	B. Oldry	Labour hold
84	Port Glasgow/Kilmacolm	A. MacLean	Labour hold
85	Cartsdyke	R. G. Young	Labour hold
86	Greenock South West	Y. Robertson	Labour hold
87	Inverclyde West	J. J. Clocherty	Labour gain from SLD
88	Irvine Central	E. Gray	Labour hold
89	Irvine South	T. Colyer	Labour hold
90	Kilwinning/Stevenson	A. Lambie	Labour hold
91	Garnock Valley	J. Jennings	Labour hold
92	Saltcoats/Ardrossan	B. McGeechan	Labour hold
93	Arran/Largs etc.	J. F. Clarkson	Conservative hold
97	Ayr North	R. Campbell	Labour hold
98	Ayr South	T. McGillivray	Conservative hold
99	Prestwick/Coylebank	J. Baillie	Labour hold
100	North Kyle	J. Gilmour	Conservative hold
101	Carrick	A. Hill	Labour gain from Conservative

=== Hamilton East ===
Hamilton East
Party	Candidate	Votes	%	±%
Labour	M. Brogan	4,945	59.2	▼4.7
SNP	Y. Dear	1,811	21.7	▲6.2
Conservative	W. Irving	987	11.8	▲3.6
Liberal Democrats	J. Oswald	608	7.3	▼4.9
Majority		3,134	37.5	▼10.9
Turnout		8,351	40.4	▼1.5
Registered electors		20,701		
Labour hold		Swing	▼4.7	

=== Hamilton West ===
Hamilton West
Party	Candidate	Votes	%	±%
Labour	J. Timmins	4,388	50.9	▼7.5
SNP	N. Dear	2,594	30.1	▲13.3
Conservative	D. Black	1,218	14.1	▲2.9
Liberal Democrats	J. Shields	414	4.8	▼8.7
Majority		1,794	20.8	▼20.8
Turnout		8,614	43.2	▼0.8
Registered electors		19,987		
Labour hold		Swing	▼7.5	

=== Larkhall and Stonehouse ===
Larkhall and Stonehouse
Party	Candidate	Votes	%	±%
Labour	J. Burns	5,483	67.5	▲5.3
SNP	M. Miller	1,844	22.7	▲1.8
Conservative	A. T. Aitchison	792	9.7	▲0.2
Majority		3,639	44.8	▲3.5
Turnout		8,119	45.1	▼0.1
Registered electors		18,003		
Labour hold		Swing	▲5.3	

=== Hamilton North ===
Hamilton North
Party	Candidate	Votes	%	±%
Labour	M. Waugh	5,650	59.5	▲5.2
SNP	T. Muir	1,606	16.9	▲4.5
Conservative	I. S. MacAuslane	1,316	13.9	▲7.5
Liberal Democrats	S. Grieve	903	9.5	▼17.2
Majority		4,044	42.6	▲15.0
Turnout		9,475	44.0	▼3.6
Registered electors		21,587		
Labour hold		Swing	▲5.2	

=== Kilmarnock North ===
Kilmarnock North
Party	Candidate	Votes	%	±%
Labour	J. Collins	4,369	44.8	▲10.4
SNP	D. Coffey	4,144	42.5	▲7.7
Conservative	G. Woodford	791	8.1	▼0.5
Scottish Green	R. Berringer	269	2.8	New
SDP	J. Kerr	164	1.7	New
Majority		225	2.3	N/A
Turnout		9,737	50.3	▲1.0
Registered electors		19,367		
Labour gain from SNP		Swing	▲1.3	

=== Kilmarnock South ===
Kilmarnock South
Party	Candidate	Votes	%	±%
Labour	J. Blaney	4,391	46.6	▼3.8
SNP	B. Graham	2,846	30.2	▲9.7
Conservative	L. Freeman	1,689	17.9	▲0.9
Liberal Democrats	J. Wells	293	3.1	New
SDP	A. Stevenson	191	2.0	New
Majority		1,545	16.4	▼13.5
Turnout		9,410	46.3	▲3.3
Registered electors		20,350		
Labour hold		Swing	▼6.7	

=== Stewarton and Irvine Valley ===
Stewarton and Irvine Valley
Party	Candidate	Votes	%	±%
Labour	W. Aitken	5,268	54.2	▼1.0
SNP	I. MacInnes	2,328	24.0	▲8.0
Conservative	J. Woods	1,786	18.4	▲0.7
SDP	M. Temple	325	3.3	New
Majority		2,940	30.2	37.5
Turnout		9,707	43.3	▲0.9
Registered electors		22,463		
Labour hold		Swing	▼4.5	

=== Cumnock ===
Cumnock
Party	Candidate	Votes	%	±%
Labour	J. Boyd	5,822	82.1	▼2.0
SNP	H. Sloan	809	11.4	▼4.1
Conservative	N. Martin	456	6.4	New
Majority		5,013	70.7	▲2.1
Turnout		7,087	44.2	▲3.6
Registered electors		16,045		
Labour hold		Swing	▲1.0	

=== New Cumnock and Doon Valley ===
New Cumnock and Doon Valley
Party	Candidate	Votes	%	±%
Labour	T. Farrell	6,278	87.7	▲18.9
Conservative	S. Shepherd	858	12.0	▲2.3
Majority		5,420	75.7	▲18.0
Turnout		7,136	42.0	▼0.8
Registered electors		17,055		
Labour hold		Swing	▲15.0	
