= Cumbernauld and Kilsyth =

Cumbernauld and Kilsyth may refer to:

- Cumbernauld and Kilsyth (district)
- Cumbernauld and Kilsyth (UK Parliament constituency)
- Cumbernauld and Kilsyth (Scottish Parliament constituency)
