= 1978 Strathclyde Regional Council election =

Strathclyde Regional Council election

← 1974	2 May 1978	1982 →

All 103 seats to Strathclyde Regional Council (Note: Although all 103 seats were due to be contested, the election in the Crosshill and Prospecthill electoral division was postponed following the death of Labour candidate and convener of the regional council, the Rev. Geoff Shaw on 28 April 1978.) 52 seats needed for a majority
- Registered: 1,765,635
- Turnout: 46.2%
	First party	Second party	Third party
	Lab	Con	SNP
Leader	Dick Stewart
Party	Labour	Conservative	SNP
Last election	71 seats, 44.0%	20 seats, 28.4%	5 seats, 15.1%
Seats won	72	25	2
Seat change	▲1	▲5	▼3
Popular vote	348,053	242,721	182,878
Percentage	43.0%	30.0%	22.6%
Swing	▼1.0%	▲1.6%	▲7.5%
Council Leader before election
Dick Stewart
Labour
Council Leader after election
Dick Stewart
Labour

Elections to Strathclyde Regional Council were held on Tuesday 2 May 1978, on the same day as the eight other Scottish regional elections. This was the second election to the regional council following the local government reforms in 1974.

The election was the last to use the 103 electoral divisions created by the Formation Electoral Arrangements in 1974. Each electoral division elected one councillor using first-past-the-post voting.

Labour, who had won the previous election to Strathclyde Regional Council, retained a large majority by winning 72 of the 103 seats – up one from the previous election in 1974. The Conservatives remained as the second-largest party after winning 25 seats, an increase of five from the previous election. Despite increasing their vote share by 7.5%, the Scottish National Party (SNP) lost three seats to hold just two as they ended as the joint third-largest party with the Liberal Party who had remained on two seats. One Independent Ratepayer was elected but no other independent candidates were returned.

One seat remained vacant following the election after the poll in the Crosshill and Prospecthill electoral division was postponed due to the death of Labour candidate and convener of the regional council, the Rev. Geoff Shaw on 28 April.

== Results ==
1978 Strathclyde Regional Council election
Party	Seats	Gains	Losses	Net gain/loss	Seats %	Votes %	Votes	+/−
Labour	72			▲1	69.9	43.0	348,053	▼1.0
Conservative	25			▲5	24.3	30.0	242,721	▲1.6
SNP	2			▼3	1.9	22.6	182,878	▲7.5
Liberal	2			0	1.9	1.8	14,219	▼2.7
Independent Ratepayers	1			0	1.0	0.7	5,754	New
SLP	0	0	0	0	0.0	0.8	6,410	New
Independent	0	0	4	▼4	0.0	0.7	5,531	▼4.2
Communist	0	0	0	0	0.0	0.3	2,423	▼0.9
Independent Labour	0	0	0	0	0.0	0.2	1,573	▼0.3
Ind. Nationalist	0	0	0	0	0.0	0.0	273	New
Workers Revolutionary	0	0	0	0	0.0	0.0	143	New
Socialist Unity	0	0	0	0	0.0	0.0	77	New
Total	102							

== Electoral division results ==
=== Kilmarnock North ===
Kilmarnock North
Party	Candidate	Votes	%	±%
Labour	J. Hunter	5,081	52.4	▼6.8
SNP	R. Brailsford	2,669	27.5	New
Conservative	P. Thomson	1,946	20.1	▼4.6
Majority		2,412	24.9	▼9.6
Turnout		9,696	48.1	▲2.2
Registered electors		20,179		
Labour hold		Swing	▼1.1	

=== Kilmarnock South ===
Kilmarnock South
Party	Candidate	Votes	%	±%
Labour	R. Carson	3,571	39.0	▼8.2
Conservative	A. McCluskey	2,903	31.7	▼9.4
SNP	G. Wilson	2,662	29.1	New
Majority		668	7.3	▲1.2
Turnout		9,136	46.1	▼4.5
Registered electors		19,846		
Labour hold		Swing	▲0.6	

=== Stewarton and Irvine Valley ===
Stewarton and Irvine Valley
Party	Candidate	Votes	%	±%
Labour	D. Fulton	4,572	42.8	▼14.3
Conservative	A. MacIntosh	3,127	29.3	▲2.2
SNP	R. Young	2,975	27.8	New
Majority		1,445	13.5	▼14.5
Turnout		10,674	51.2	▼2.3
Registered electors		20,870		
Labour hold		Swing	▼8.2	

=== Cumnock ===
Cumnock
Party	Candidate	Votes	%	±%
Labour	W. Paterson	3,910	51.9	N/A
SLP	W. Dick	1,877	24.9	N/A
Conservative	J. Findlay	952	12.6	N/A
SNP	I. Cole	785	10.4	N/A
Majority		2,033	27.0	N/A
Turnout		7,524	46.1	N/A
Registered electors		16,351		
Labour hold		Swing	N/A	

=== New Cumnock and Doon Valley ===
New Cumnock and Doon Valley
Party	Candidate	Votes	%	±%
Labour	W. Goudie	3,906	48.3	N/A
SLP	A. Neil	3,001	37.1	N/A
Conservative	A. McInnes	1,164	14.4	N/A
Majority		905	11.2	N/A
Turnout		8,071	47.1	N/A
Registered electors		17,171		
Labour hold		Swing	N/A	
