= 1977 Argyll and Bute District Council election =

1977 Scottish local government election

1977 Argyll and Bute Council election
| ← 1974 | 7 May 1977 | 1980 → |

All 26 seats to Argyll and Bute Council 14 seats needed for a majority
| | First party | Second party | Third party |
|---|---|---|---|
| Party | Independent | Conservative | SNP |
| Seats won | 20 | 4 | 2 |
| Seat change | ▼1 | ▼1 | ▲2 |
| Popular vote | 8,416 | 2,772 | 1,613 |
| Percentage | 63.9% | 21.0% | 12.2% |
| Swing | ▼1.3% | ▲1.9% | ▲8.4% |
Council Control
Independent

Elections to Argyll and Bute Council were held in May 1977, the same day as the other Scottish local government district elections

== Election results ==
Argyll and Bute District Council Election Result 1977
| Party | Seats | Gains | Losses | Net gain/loss | Seats % | Votes % | Votes | +/− |
|---|---|---|---|---|---|---|---|---|
| Independent | 20 | 0 | ▼1 | ▼1 | | 63.9 | 8,416 | ▼1.3 |
| Conservative | 4 | 0 | ▼1 | ▼1 | | 21.0 | 2,772 | ▲1.9 |
| SNP | 2 | ▲2 | 0 | ▲2 | | 12.2 | 1,613 | ▲8.4 |
| Labour | 0 | 0 | 0 | 0 | 0.0 | 2.9 | 378 | ▼9.0 |
