= 1994 Strathclyde Regional Council election =

Strathclyde Regional Council election

- 5 May 1994

All 104 seats to Strathclyde Regional Council 53 seats needed for a majority
	First party	Second party	Third party
	Lab	SNP	LD
Leader	Robert Gould
Party	Labour	SNP	Liberal Democrats
Last election	90 seats, 52.3%	1 seat, 21.3%	4 seats, 5.8%
Seats won	86	7	6
Seat change	▼4	▲6	▲2
Popular vote	398,886	203,907	62,294
Percentage	51.5%	26.3%	8.0%
Swing	▼0.8%	▲5.0%	▲2.2%
- Result of the election
Council Leader before election
Robert Gould
Labour
Council Leader after election
Robert Gould
Labour

Elections to Strathclyde Regional Council were held on Thursday 5 May 1994, on the same day as the eight other Scottish regional elections. This was the final election to the regional council which was abolished in 1995 along with the 19 district councils and replaced by 12 unitary authorities following the implementation of the Local Government etc. (Scotland) Act 1994.

This election was the only one to use the 104 electoral divisions created following the Second Statutory Reviews of Electoral Arrangements in 1993 – an increase of one from the previous election in 1990. The new electoral division was established in the Kilmarnock and Loudoun district. Each electoral division elected one councillor using first-past-the-post voting.

Labour, who had won every previous election to Strathclyde Regional Council, retained a large majority by winning 86 of the 104 seats – down four from the previous election. The Scottish National Party (SNP) became the second-largest party on the council after they won seven seats – up from just one four years previous. They overtook both the Liberal Democrats, who remained the third-largest party with six seats (an increase of two), and the Conservatives, who fell to fourth after retaining just three of their five seats. The other two seats were won by independent candidates.

== Results ==
Interactive map of results in each electoral division

1994 Strathclyde Regional Council election
Party	Seats	Gains	Losses	Net gain/loss	Seats %	Votes %	Votes	+/−
Labour	86			▼4	82.7	51.5	398,886	▼0.7
SNP	7			▲6	6.7	26.3	203,907	▲5.1
Liberal Democrats	6			▲2	5.8	8.0	62,294	▲2.1
Conservative	3			▼2	2.9	10.7	83,062	▼5.6
Independent	2			▼1	1.9	1.8	13,814	▼0.2
Scottish Militant Labour	0	0		Steady	0.0	1.0	9,277	New
Green	0	0		Steady	0.0	0.3	2,374	▼1.7
Independent Labour	0	0		Steady	0.0	0.0	336	▼0.2
People Pension Power	0	0		Steady	0.0	0.0	313	New
Monster Raving Loony	0	0		Steady	0.0	0.0	185	New
Communist	0	0		Steady	0.0	0.0	92	New
Total	104						774,540	

== Electoral division results ==
=== Kintyre ===
Kintyre
Party	Candidate	Votes	%
Labour	George McMillan	2,073	66.7
SNP	A. J. MacLellan	1,035	33.3
Majority		1,038	33.4
Turnout		3,108	37.3
Labour hold			

=== Mid Argyll and Islay ===
Mid Argyll and Islay
Party	Candidate	Votes	%
Liberal Democrats	Alison J. Hay	1,929	37.9
Independent	D. MacMillan	1,903	37.4
SNP	J. Hunter	1,252	24.6
Majority		26	0.5
Turnout		5,084	46.1
Liberal Democrats hold			

=== Lorn and Mull ===
Lorn and Mull
Party	Candidate	Votes	%
SNP	Campbell Cameron	2,421	45.5
Liberal Democrats	W. R. Shaw	2,044	38.4
Conservative	W. Loynd	845	15.9
Majority		377	7.1
Turnout		5310	43.9
SNP hold			

=== Bute and West Cowal ===
Bute and West Cowal
Party	Candidate	Votes	%
SNP	Alexander W. MacQueen	2,008	47.1
Independent	J. McMillan	1,323	31.0
Labour	D. Flowers	925	21.7
Majority		685	16.1
Turnout		4,256	51.4
SNP gain from Independent			

=== Dunoon and East Cowal ===
Dunoon and East Cowal
Party	Candidate	Votes	%
Independent	James Walsh	2,825	65.8
SNP	E. Drummond	1,062	24.7
Independent	P Menzies	401	9.3
Majority		1,763	41.1
Turnout		4,288	45.2
Independent hold			

=== Rutherglen/Fernhill ===
Rutherglen/Fernhill
Party	Candidate	Votes	%
Labour	G. McCredle	3,793	41.5
Liberal Democrats	M. McLellan	3,204	35.1
SNP	A. Fulton	1,470	16.1
Conservative	J. Miller	657	7.2
Majority		589	6.4
Turnout		9,124	49.0
Registered electors		18,640	
Labour win (new seat)			

=== Cambuslang/Halfway ===
Cambuslang/Halfway
Party	Candidate	Votes	%	±%
Labour	A. McGowan	4,606	62.5	▲7.0
SNP	D. Hamilton	1,359	18.4	▲0.3
Liberal Democrats	D. Guthrie	995	13.5	▲3.3
Conservative	K. Briody	401	5.4	▼9.0
Majority		3,247	44.1	▲6.7
Turnout		7,361	43.8	▼0.7
Registered electors		16,789		
Labour hold		Swing	▲3.3	

=== Cumbernauld South ===
Cumbernauld South
Party	Candidate	Votes	%
Labour	G. McElroy	3,543	49.4
SNP	W. Carmichael	3,254	45.4
Conservative	A. Williamson	191	2.6
Independent	M. Kielty	180	2.5
Majority		289	0.4
Turnout		7,168	47.0
Registered electors		15,250	

=== Blantyre and Burnbank ===
Blantyre and Burnbank
Party	Candidate	Votes	%
Labour	M. Waugh	4,749	73.0
SNP	R. L. Terrett	1,202	18.5
Liberal Democrats	D. McAllister	291	4.4
Conservative	I. Black	256	3.9
Majority		3,547	54.5
Turnout		6,498	41.3
Registered electors		15,714	
Labour win (new seat)			

=== Bothwell and Hamilton North ===
Bothwell and Hamilton North
Party	Candidate	Votes	%
Labour	J. Ormiston	3,348	50.9
SNP	C. Sutherland	1,334	20.2
Liberal Democrats	J. Oswald	1,026	15.6
Conservative	E. Montgomery	867	13.1
Majority		2,014	30.7
Turnout		6,575	41.9
Registered electors		15,699	
Labour win (new seat)			

=== Hamilton West ===
Hamilton East was renamed as Hamilton West following the Second Statutory Reviews of Electoral Arrangements. There were changes to the boundaries.

Hamilton West
Party	Candidate	Votes	%	±%
Labour	M. Brogan	3,418	58.9	▼0.3
SNP	J. McGuigan	1,497	25.8	▲4.1
Liberal Democrats	A. Oswald	527	9.1	▲1.8
Conservative	N. Cameron	352	6.0	▼5.8
Majority		1,921	33.1	▼4.4
Turnout		5,794	37.3	▼3.1
Registered electors		15,526		
Labour hold		Swing	▼2.2	

=== Hamilton South ===
Hamilton West was renamed as Hamilton South following the Second Statutory Reviews of Electoral Arrangements. There were changes to the boundaries.

Hamilton South
Party	Candidate	Votes	%	±%
Labour	J. Timmins	3,465	48.6	▼2.3
SNP	J. Smith	2,931	41.1	▲11.0
Conservative	C. Simpson	720	10.1	▼4.0
Majority		534	7.5	▼13.3
Turnout		7,116	44.5	▲1.3
Registered electors		15,991		
Labour hold		Swing	▼6.6	

=== Larkhall and Stonehouse ===
Larkhall and Stonehouse
Party	Candidate	Votes	%	±%
Labour	J. Burns	5,545	69.2	▲1.7
SNP	L. McDonald	1,955	24.4	▲1.7
Conservative	D. Ballantine	506	6.3	▼3.4
Majority		3,590	44.8	Steady
Turnout		8,006	43.4	▼1.7
Registered electors		18,455		
Labour hold		Swing	Steady	

=== Calderwood/St Leonard's ===
Calderwood/St Leonard's
Party	Candidate	Votes	%	±%
Labour	A. Maggs	4,415	59.7	▲3.8
SNP	R. Littler	2,062	27.8	▲2.0
Liberal Democrats	D. Service	502	6.7	▼0.4
Conservative	L. Kay	414	5.6	▼5.6
Majority		2,353	31.9	▲1.8
Turnout		7,393	47.6	▼0.5
Registered electors		15,524		
Labour hold		Swing	▲3.8	

=== Westwood/Mains ===
Westwood/Mains
Party	Candidate	Votes	%	±%
Labour	D. M. Sanderson	4,986	61.9	▲8.6
SNP	M. Gillespie	2,184	27.1	▲0.8
Liberal Democrats	D. Service	484	6.0	▲1.5
Conservative	N. Craig	398	4.9	▼6.5
Majority		2,802	34.8	▲7.8
Turnout		8,052	49.6	▲0.5
Registered electors		16,208		
Labour hold		Swing	▲8.6	

=== Murray/Greenhills ===
Murray/Greenhills
Party	Candidate	Votes	%
Labour	P. Watters	4,581	63.1
SNP	J. Reilly	2,006	27.6
Liberal Democrats	J. McKenna	412	5.6
Conservative	M. Cameron	260	3.5
Majority		2,575	36.5
Turnout		7,259	45.7
Registered electors		15,875	
Labour win (new seat)			

=== Avondale/Hairmyres and Stewartfield ===
Avondale/Hairmyres and Stewartfield
Party	Candidate	Votes	%
Labour	J. Molloy	2,553	37.6
SNP	C. Boyle	1,849	27.2
Conservative	E. Kay	1,526	22.4
Liberal Democrats	C. Linskey	858	12.6
Majority		704	10.4
Turnout		6786	42.2
Registered electors		16,076	
Labour win (new seat)			

=== Lanark and Lesmahagow ===
Lanark and Lesmahagow
Party	Candidate	Votes	%	±%
Labour	M. Smith	3,674	54.7	▲3.8
SNP	T. Ashburn	1,937	28.8	▲6.3
Conservative	J. MacInnes	1,105	16.4	▼4.1
Majority		1,737	25.9	▼2.5
Turnout		6,716	43.9	▼3.0
Registered electors		15,302		
Labour hold		Swing	▲3.8	

=== Tinto ===
Tinto
Party	Candidate	Votes	%	±%
Labour	A. Lawson	2,798	48.1	▼2.5
SNP	J. Semple	1,748	30.0	▲11.1
Conservative	M. Ashmore	1,267	21.8	▼8.6
Majority		1,050	18.1	▼2.1
Turnout		5,813	43.2	▼2.8
Registered electors		13,481		
Labour hold		Swing	▼6.8	

=== Carluke ===
Carluke
Party	Candidate	Votes	%	±%
Labour	J. Watson	4,091	54.6	▲1.1
SNP	C. Briggs	2,586	34.5	▲7.4
Conservative	S. Duncan	812	10.8	▼8.5
Majority		1,505	20.1	▼6.3
Turnout		7,489	46.4	▲2.2
Registered electors		16,145		
Labour hold		Swing	▲1.1	

=== Greenock Central East ===
Greenock Central East
Party	Candidate	Votes	%
Labour	Alexander McGhee	4,246	60.1
SNP	J. Riddell	1,448	20.5
SNP	S. Beith	1,159	16.4
Conservative	A. C. McFadden	209	2.9
Majority		2,798	39.6
Turnout		7,062	42.9
Labour win (new seat)			

=== Greenock South West ===
Greenock South West
Party	Candidate	Votes	%
Labour	Yvonne Robertson	4,240	59.1
SNP	S. Hilton	1,434	19.9
Liberal Democrats	J. McDonald	1,358	18.9
Conservative	M. Menzies	140	1.9
Majority		2,806	39.2
Turnout		7,172	42.0
Labour hold			

=== Inverclyde West ===
Inverclyde West
Party	Candidate	Votes	%
Liberal Democrats	Robert K. Campbell	4,223	48.2
Labour	J. J. Clocherty	2,507	28.6
SNP	I. Ramsay	1,390	15.8
Conservative	B. Sadler	635	7.2
Majority		1,716	19.6
Turnout		8,755	51.6
Liberal Democrats gain from Labour			

=== Irvine Central ===
Irvine Central
Party	Candidate	Votes	%
Labour	Elliot Gray	4,186	65.2
SNP	M. Burns	1,475	23.0
Conservative	E. Gibson	464	7.2
Liberal Democrats	M. Eyre	289	4.5
Majority		2,711	42.2
Turnout		6,414	41.9
Labour hold			

=== Irvine South ===
Irvine South
Party	Candidate	Votes	%
Labour	Thomas Colyer	3,967	52.9
SNP	A. McDowell	2,766	36.9
Liberal Democrats	J. McDill	297	3.9
Conservative	J. Rennie	282	3.7
Independent	D. McLaughlin	180	2.4
Majority		1,201	16.0
Turnout		7,492	45.0
Labour hold			

=== Kilwinning and Stevenston ===
Kilwinning and Stevenston
Party	Candidate	Votes	%
Labour	Archibald Lambie	4,241	59.7
SNP	S. Scott	1,628	22.9
Conservative	J. Cownie	460	6.4
Liberal Democrats	John Boss	452	6.3
People Pension Power	Robert Haggarty	313	4.4
Majority		2,613	0.0
Turnout		7,094	41.2
Registered electors		17,215	
Labour win (new seat)			

=== Garnock Valley ===
Garnock Valley
Party	Candidate	Votes	%
Labour	James Jennings	4,444	53.2
SNP	James Langlands	2,010	24.0
Conservative	John Glendinning	979	11.7
Liberal Democrats	J. Blanco	599	7.1
Majority		2,434	0.0
Turnout		8,032	49.6
Registered electors		16,834	
Labour win (new seat)			

=== Saltcoats and Ardrossan ===
Saltcoats and Ardrossan
Party	Candidate	Votes	%
Labour	Margaret Munn	4,760	57.6
SNP	Jim Kerr	2,200	26.6
Conservative	Helen McKinlay	867	10.5
Liberal Democrats	Clementina Martin	428	5.1
Majority		2,560	0.0
Turnout		8,255	47.4
Registered electors		17,429	
Labour win (new seat)			

=== Largs, West Kilbride and Arran ===
Largs, West Kilbride and Arran
Party	Candidate	Votes	%
Conservative	J. Fergus Clarkson	3,472	34.0
Labour	John Sillars	3,274	32.1
SNP	R. Flack	2,145	21.0
Liberal Democrats	D. Roberts	1,309	12.8
Majority		198	0.0
Turnout		10,200	48.3
Registered electors		21,111	
Conservative win (new seat)			

=== Kilmarnock Central ===
Kilmarnock Central
Party	Candidate	Votes	%
SNP	Gordon McCredle	3,755	47.0
Labour	D. Spelman	3,492	43.7
Conservative	D. Rubin	739	9.2
Majority		263	3.3
Turnout		7,510	51.3
Registered electors		15,588	
SNP win (new seat)			

=== Kilmarnock South ===
Kilmarnock South
Party	Candidate	Votes	%
Labour	John Blaney	3,446	45.5
SNP	C. Calman	3,429	45.2
Conservative	T. Donald	698	9.2
Majority		17	0.3
Turnout		7,573	48.6
Registered electors		15,582	
Labour win (new seat)			

=== Stewarton and Kilmarnock North ===
Stewarton and Kilmarnock North
Party	Candidate	Votes	%
SNP	Daniel Coffey	4,173	53.8
Labour	W. Denim	2,683	34.6
Conservative	R. Humphreys	898	11.5
Majority		1,490	19.2
Turnout		7,754	49.0
Registered electors		15,837	
SNP win (new seat)			

=== Irvine Valley ===
Irvine Valley
Party	Candidate	Votes	%
SNP	Kim Nicoll	3,677	49.5
Labour	W. Aitken	3,267	44.0
Conservative	L. Freeman	478	6.4
Majority		410	4.5
Turnout		7,422	49.7
Registered electors		14,936	
SNP win (new seat)			

=== Prestwick and North Ayr ===
Prestwick and North Ayr
Party	Candidate	Votes	%
Labour	John Baillie	5,638	58.8
Conservative	J. Clark	2,373	24.7
SNP	F. O'Connor	1,573	16.4
Majority		3,265	34.1
Turnout		9,584	52.3
Labour win (new seat)			

=== Ayr Central ===
Ayr Central
Party	Candidate	Votes	%
Labour	Robert Campbell	5,118	55.2
Conservative	R. Redmond	2,783	30.0
SNP	S. Fisher	1,369	14.7
Majority		2,335	25.2
Turnout		9,270	49.8
Labour win (new seat)			

=== Ayr South, Coylton and Annbank ===
Ayr South, Coylton and Annbank
Party	Candidate	Votes	%
Labour	Elaine Murray	4,878	50.8
Conservative	R. MacLellan	2,904	30.2
SNP	J. Dalton	1,814	18.9
Majority		1,974	20.6
Turnout		9,596	53.3
Labour win (new seat)			

=== North Kyle ===
North Kyle
Party	Candidate	Votes	%
Labour	Patrick Browne	4,938	46.9
Conservative	J. Gilmour	3,719	35.3
SNP	Ian Douglas	1,856	17.6
Majority		1,219	11.6
Turnout		10,513	56.0
Labour gain from Conservative			

=== Carrick ===
Carrick
Party	Candidate	Votes	%
Labour	Andrew Hill	3,730	50.1
SNP	R. Hollins	2,124	28.5
Conservative	R. Crosthwaite	1,591	21.3
Majority		1,606	21.6
Turnout		7,445	47.1
Labour hold			

=== Cumnock ===
Cumnock
Party	Candidate	Votes	%	±%
Labour	James Boyd	5,982	80.0	▼2.1
SNP	J. Robertson	1,161	15.5	▲4.1
Conservative	R. Henderson	328	4.3	▼2.1
Majority		4,821	64.5	▼6.2
Turnout		7,471	46.7	▲2.5
Registered electors		15,990		
Labour hold		Swing	▼3.1	

=== New Cumnock and Doon Valley ===
New Cumnock and Doon Valley
Party	Candidate	Votes	%	±%
Labour	Thomas Farrell	5,523	78.3	▼9.4
SNP	K. Johnstone	1,088	15.4	New
Conservative	G. Clark	442	4.3	▼7.7
Majority		4,435	62.9	▼12.8
Turnout		7,053	41.3	▼0.7
Registered electors		17,064		
Labour hold		Swing	▼12.4	
