= 1980 Inverclyde District Council election =

1980 Scottish local government election

← 1977	1 May 1980	1984 →

All 23 Seats to Inverclyde District District Council 12 seats needed for a majority
	First party	Second party	Third party
Party	Labour	Liberal	Conservative
Last election	8 seats, 35.0%	13 seats, 43.8%	1 seat, 9.9%
Seats won	13	9	1
Seat change	▲5	▼4	Steady
Popular vote	18,708	18,071	2,075
Percentage	46.2%	44.7%	5.1%
Swing	▲11.2%	▲0.9%	▼4.8%

The 1980 Inverclyde District Council election was held on 1 May 1980 alongside the local elections taking place all over Scotland.

== Results ==
1980 Inverclyde District Council election result
Party	Seats	Gains	Losses	Net gain/loss	Seats %	Votes %	Votes	+/−
Labour	13	6	1	▲5	56.5	46.2	18,708	▲11.2
Liberal	9	1	5	▼4	39.1	44.7	18,071	▲0.9
Conservative	1	0	0	Steady	4.3	5.1	2,075	▼4.8
SNP	0	0	1	▼1	4.3	3.9	1,580	▼4.4
Communist	0	0	0	Steady	0.0	0.1	26	New
