= 1984 Inverclyde District Council election =

1984 Scottish local government election

← 1980	3 May 1984	1988 →

All 20 Seats to Inverclyde District District Council 11 seats needed for a majority
	First party	Second party
Party	Labour	Alliance
Last election	13 seats, 46.2%	9 seats, 44.7%
Seats won	11	9
Seat change	▼2	Steady
Popular vote	18,888	16,433
Percentage	49.2%	42.8%
Swing	▲3.0%	▼1.9%

The 1984 Inverclyde District Council election was held on 3 May 1984 alongside the local elections taking place all over Scotland. The number of seats fell from 23 in 1980 to 20.

== Results ==
1984 Inverclyde District Council election result
Party	Seats	Gains	Losses	Net gain/loss	Seats %	Votes %	Votes	+/−
Labour	11	-	-	▼2	55.0	49.2	18,888	▲3.0
Liberal	9	-	-	Steady	45.0	42.8	16,433	▼1.9
Conservative	0	-	-	▼1	0.0	4.8	1,839	▼0.3
SNP	0	-	-	Steady	0.0	3.2	1,244	▼0.7
