= 1980 Argyll and Bute District Council election =

1980 Scottish local government election

1980 Argyll and Bute Council election
← 1977	1 May 1980	1984 →

All 26 seats to Argyll and Bute Council 14 seats needed for a majority
	First party	Second party	Third party
Party	Independent	SNP	Conservative
Seats won	20	3	2
Seat change	0	▲1	▼2
Popular vote	6,788	1,041	2,305
Percentage	59.0%	9.1%	20.0%
Swing	▼4.9%	▼3.1%	▼1.0%
	Fourth party
Party	Labour
Seats won	1
Seat change	▲1
Popular vote	1,364
Percentage	11.9%
Swing	▲9.0%
Council Control before election
Independent
Council Control
Independent

Elections to Argyll and Bute Council were held in May 1980, the same day as the other Scottish local government district elections

== Election results ==
Argyll and Bute District Council Election Result 1980
Party	Seats	Gains	Losses	Net gain/loss	Seats %	Votes %	Votes	+/−
Independent	20	0	0	0		59.0	6,788	▼4.9
SNP	3	▲1	0	▲1		9.1	1,041	▼3.1
Conservative	2	0	▼2	▼2		20.0	2,305	▼1.0
Labour	1	▲1	0	▲1		11.9	1,364	▲9.0
