= 1984 Argyll and Bute District Council election =

1984 Scottish local government election

1984 Argyll and Bute Council election
| ← 1980 | 3 May 1984 | 1988 → |

All 26 seats to Argyll and Bute Council 14 seats needed for a majority
| | First party | Second party | Third party |
|---|---|---|---|
| Party | Independent | Conservative | SNP |
| Seats won | 22 | 3 | 1 |
| Seat change | ▲2 | ▲1 | ▼2 |
| Popular vote | 7,203 | 1,138 | 822 |
| Percentage | 75.3% | 11.9% | 8.6% |
| Swing | ▲16.3% | ▼8.1% | ▼0.5% |
Council Control before election
Independent
Council Control
Independent

Elections to Argyll and Bute Council were held in May 1984, the same day as the other Scottish local government district elections. Independent candidates remained the largest group on the council, gaining two seats overall, the Conservatives gained one while the SNP lost two seats and the Labour Party lost their only seat.

== Election results ==
Argyll and Bute District Council Election Result 1984
| Party | Seats | Gains | Losses | Net gain/loss | Seats % | Votes % | Votes | +/− |
|---|---|---|---|---|---|---|---|---|
| Independent | 22 | ▲2 | 0 | ▲2 | | 75.3 | 7,203 | ▲16.3 |
| Conservative | 3 | ▲1 | 0 | ▲1 | | 11.9 | 1,138 | ▼8.1 |
| SNP | 1 | 0 | ▼2 | ▼2 | | 8.6 | 822 | ▼0.5 |
| Labour | 0 | 0 | ▼1 | ▼1 | 0.0 | 4.3 | 409 | ▼7.6 |
