= 1977 Inverclyde District Council election =

1977 Scottish local government election

← 1974	3 May 1977	1980 →

All 23 Seats to Inverclyde District District Council 12 seats needed for a majority
	First party	Second party
Party	Liberal	Labour
Last election	4 seats, 37.5%	15 seats, 44.7%
Seats won	13	8
Seat change	▲9	▼7
Popular vote	16,052	12,801
Percentage	43.8%	35.0%
Swing	▲6.3%	▼9.7%
	Third party	Fourth party
Party	Conservative	SNP
Last election	3 seats, 14.4%	Did not contest
Seats won	1	1
Seat change	▼2	▲1
Popular vote	3,611	3,055
Percentage	9.9%	8.3%
Swing	▼4.5%	New

The 1977 Inverclyde District Council election was held on 3 May 1977 alongside the local elections taking place all over Scotland.

== Results ==
1977 Inverclyde District Council election result
Party	Seats	Gains	Losses	Net gain/loss	Seats %	Votes %	Votes	+/−
Liberal	13	9	0	▲9	56.5	43.8	16,052	▲6.3
Labour	8	0	7	▼7	34.8	35.0	12,801	▼9.7
Conservative	1	0	2	▼2	4.3	9.9	3,611	▼4.5
SNP	1	1	0	▲1	4.3	8.3	3,055	New
Independent	0	0	1	▼1	0.0	2.6	954	▼0.6
Independent Labour	0	0	0	Steady	0.0	0.4	143	New
