= Geoff Shaw (minister) =

Church of Scotland minister

Geoffrey Mackintosh Shaw (9 April 1927 – 28 April 1978) was a Church of Scotland minister who had an unconventional ministry outside the normal parish structures and became the first Convener of Strathclyde Regional Council. He was widely expected to become the first leader of a proposed devolved Scottish Executive, but died before the Scotland Act 1978 had achieved implementation.

== Family and education ==
Coming from a wealthy Edinburgh family, he was educated at Edinburgh Academy. He left with the intention of studying law at university with the aim of becoming a lawyer. He was called up for National Service in the Royal Navy, during which he felt a calling to become a minister.

On his return he studied arts and divinity at Edinburgh University, graduating MA in 1950. As part of his theological studies, he went to Union Theological Seminary in the City of New York.

== Ordained ministry ==
Whilst in New York Shaw had experienced work with people from the poorest parts of that city, particularly East Harlem. On his return to Scotland he formed a partnership with Walter and Elizabeth Fyfe, and John and Beryl Jardine, and together they established the Gorbals Group. This was a radical experiment in social gospel ministry within the Church of Scotland outside conventional parish structures.

The three ministers lived in the Gorbals area of Glasgow, then regarded as one of the worst urban slum areas in Europe. Shaw lived in a flat in Cleland Street, where he sought to help some of the most marginalised people in the community. When the flat in Cleland Street was demolished in 1975 he moved to Queen Mary Avenue in Crosshill.

== Political career ==
Shaw's radical ministry led him into socialist politics. He joined the Labour Party and was elected councillor for Govanhill in 1970 (on the former Glasgow Corporation, where he later became leader of the administration). Local government reorganisation in 1975 saw him become Convener of Strathclyde Regional Council.

The Scotland Act 1978 was enacted by the British Parliament with the intention of creating a devolved Scottish Assembly and Scottish Executive. Geoff Shaw was widely tipped to become "First Secretary" in the proposed Scottish Executive. In 1998, Ron Ferguson wrote in The Herald newspaper:

At the time of Geoff Shaw's death, it looked as if Scotland was on the brink of achieving Home Rule. And the name on many people's lips as the obvious candidate for first Scottish premier was the Rev Geoffrey Mackintosh Shaw. The Evening Times had run an article on its front page, under the banner headline, Who will be Scotland's first Prime Minister?. They profiled various candidates, and put their money on Shaw.

Support like this from the press was in some ways ironic as Shaw, like much of the Labour left, had initially been hostile to devolution; indeed, whilst a member of the Scottish party's executive committee in 1974 he voted with the majority in rejecting the Wilson Government's various White Paper proposals for the establishment of a Scottish Assembly. But, as Ferguson argues, Shaw was a party loyalist to his bones, and once support for Home Rule was accepted as Labour policy he became reconciled to the idea, reasoning that a devolved government in Edinburgh would not necessarily pose a threat to the existence of regional councils as he had originally feared. However, Shaw died before the Scotland Act had been implemented, and its provisions never came into force. Twenty years later the Scotland Act 1998 eventually created a new Scottish Parliament, which first sat in 1999.

== Death and legacy ==
Overwork and smoking eventually led to a heart attack, and although he recovered initially, he suffered a relapse and died on 28 April 1978 at the age of 51. He was survived by his wife Sarah, whom he had married only a few years earlier. His funeral was an elaborate ceremony in Glasgow Cathedral, which (despite the failure of the Scotland Act 1978) has been likened to a formal state funeral for a state premier.

A community centre in the Toryglen area of south Glasgow is named after him.

Scotrail’s Class 318 250 carries a plaque internally to Shaw’s memory.

== Sources ==
- Finlay, Richard J. "Shaw, Geoffrey Mackintosh". Oxford Dictionary of National Biography (online ed.). Oxford University Press. doi:10.1093/ref:odnb/101333. (Subscription, Wikipedia Library access or UK public library membership required.)
- Geoff, biography of Geoff Shaw by Ronald Ferguson
