= 1977 Cumbernauld and Kilsyth District Council election =

1977 Scottish local government election

← 1974	3 May 1977	1980 →

All 10 seats to Cumbernauld and Kilsyth District Council 6 seats needed for a majority
	First party	Second party
Party	SNP	Labour
Last election	7 seats, 49.7%	3 seats. 45.5%
Seats won	7	3
Seat change	Steady	Steady
Popular vote	9,873	7,997
Percentage	46.6%	37.8%
Swing	▼3.1%	▼7.7%

Elections to Cumbernauld and Kilsyth District Council were held on 3 May 1977, the same day as the other Scottish local government elections.

== Results ==
1977 Cumbernauld and Kilsyth District Council election result
Party	Seats	Gains	Losses	Net gain/loss	Seats %	Votes %	Votes	+/−
SNP	7	1	1	Steady	70.0	46.6	9,873	▼3.1
Labour	3	1	1	Steady	30.0	37.8	7,997	▼7.7
Conservative	0	0	0	Steady	0.0	11.7	2,468	New
Independent	0	0	0	Steady	0.0	2.5	533	▼1.9
Independent Labour	0	0	0	Steady	0.0	1.0	209	New
Communist	0	0	0	Steady	0.0	0.4	76	▼0.1
