= 1984 Cumbernauld and Kilsyth District Council election =

1984 Scottish local government election

| ← 1980 | 3 May 1984 | 1988 → |

All 12 seats to Cumbernauld and Kilsyth District Council 7 seats needed for a majority
| | First party | Second party |
|---|---|---|
| Party | Labour | SNP |
| Last election | 6 seats, 54.2% | 4 seats. 37.6% |
| Seats won | 8 | 4 |
| Seat change | ▲2 | Steady |
| Popular vote | 13,002 | 8,574 |
| Percentage | 56.3% | 37.1% |
| Swing | ▲2.1% | ▼0.5% |

Elections to Cumbernauld and Kilsyth District Council were held on 3 May 1984, the same day as the other Scottish local government elections. There were 12 wards - an increase of 2 over 1980.

== Results ==
1984 Cumbernauld and Kilsyth District Council election result
| Party | Seats | Gains | Losses | Net gain/loss | Seats % | Votes % | Votes | +/− |
|---|---|---|---|---|---|---|---|---|
| Labour | 8 | - | - | ▲2 | 66.7 | 56.3 | 13,002 | ▲2.1 |
| SNP | 4 | - | - | Steady | 33.3 | 37.1 | 8,574 | ▼0.5 |
| Conservative | 0 | - | - | Steady | 0.0 | 2.9 | 668 | ▼3.0 |
| Alliance | 0 | - | - | Steady | 0.0 | 2.7 | 622 | ▲1.8 |
| Independent Labour | 0 | - | - | Steady | 0.0 | 1.0 | 229 | ▼0.4 |
