= 1980 Cumbernauld and Kilsyth District Council election =

1980 Scottish local government election

← 1977	1 May 1980	1984 →

All 10 seats to Cumbernauld and Kilsyth District Council 6 seats needed for a majority
	First party	Second party
Party	Labour	SNP
Last election	3 seats, 37.8%	7 seats. 46.6%
Seats won	6	4
Seat change	▲3	▼3
Popular vote	12,113	8,403
Percentage	54.2%	37.6%
Swing	▲16.4%	▼9.0%

Elections to Cumbernauld and Kilsyth District Council were held on 1 May 1980, the same day as the other Scottish local government elections.

== Results ==
1980 Cumbernauld and Kilsyth District Council election result
Party	Seats	Gains	Losses	Net gain/loss	Seats %	Votes %	Votes	+/−
Labour	6	3	0	▲3	60.0	54.2	12,113	▲16.4
SNP	4	0	3	▼3	40.0	37.6	8,403	▼9.0
Conservative	0	0	0	Steady	0.0	5.9	1,323	▼5.8
Independent Labour	0	0	0	Steady	0.0	1.4	310	▲0.4
Liberal	0	0	0	Steady	0.0	0.9	193	New
