= Charles Gray (Scottish politician) =

Scottish politician (1929–2023)

Sir Charles Ireland Gray CBE (25 January 1929 – 10 February 2023) was a Scottish Labour Party politician.

== Life and career ==
Charles Gray was born on 25 January 1929. He joined the Labour Party at age 16. Gray rose to become leader of Strathclyde Regional Council from 1986 to 1992 and President of the Convention of Scottish Local Authorities.

In November 2013, Gray announced that he planned to vote 'Yes' in the 2014 Scottish independence referendum, and urged all Labour supporters to do the same.

Gray died on 10 February 2023, at the age of 94.
