= 1974 Strathclyde Regional Council election =

Strathclyde Regional Council election

| 7 May 1974 | 1978 → |

All 103 seats to Strathclyde Regional Council 52 seats needed for a majority
- Registered: 1,773,010
- Turnout: 51.7%
| | First party | Second party | Third party |
|---|---|---|---|
| | Lab | Con | SNP |
| Leader | Dick Stewart |
| Party | Labour | Conservative | SNP |
| Seats won | 71 | 20 | 5 |
| Popular vote | 388,480 | 250,719 | 132,871 |
| Percentage | 44.0% | 28.4% | 15.1% |
Council Leader after election
Labour

Elections to Strathclyde Regional Council were held on Tuesday 7 May 1974, on the same day as the eight other Scottish regional elections. This was the first election to the regional council following the implementation of the Local Government (Scotland) Act 1973.

The election used the 103 electoral divisions created by the Formation Electoral Arrangements in 1974. Each electoral division elected one councillor using first-past-the-post voting.

Labour took control of the regional council after winning a large majority of the seats. The party won 71 of the 103 seats and took 44% of the popular vote. The Conservatives were the second-largest party after winning 20 seats. The Scottish National Party (SNP) came third in the popular vote and took five seats. The Liberal Party took two seats while the other five were won by independent candidates.

== Background ==
Prior to reform, local government in Scotland was made up of a system of counties and burghs. County councils controlled most of the local government functions across the country while the burghs had limited powers over smaller geographical areas. Small burghs had some control over planning as well as local taxation, building control, housing, lighting and drainage while large burghs also had further powers over the police, public health, social services, registration of births, marriages and deaths and electoral registration.

Following the recommendations in the Wheatly Report, the old system of counties and burghs – which had resulted in a mishmash of local government areas in which some small burghs had larger populations but far fewer responsibilities than some large burghs and even counties – was to be replaced by a new system of regional and district councils.

The area that was to become Strathclyde was made up of the former counties of Ayrshire, Buteshire, Dunbartonshire, Lanarkshire and Renfrewshire in full as well as the City of Glasgow, most of Argyll and part of Stirlingshire.

== Results ==
1974 Strathclyde Regional Council election
| Party | Seats | Gains | Losses | Net gain/loss | Seats % | Votes % | Votes | +/− |
|---|---|---|---|---|---|---|---|---|
| Labour | 71 | | | Steady | 68.9 | 44.0 | 388,480 | Steady |
| Conservative | 20 | | | Steady | 19.4 | 28.4 | 250,719 | Steady |
| SNP | 5 | | | Steady | 4.9 | 15.1 | 132,871 | Steady |
| Independent | 5 | | | Steady | 4.9 | 4.9 | 43,227 | Steady |
| Liberal | 2 | | | Steady | 1.9 | 4.5 | 39,839 | Steady |
| Communist | 0 | | | Steady | 0.0 | 1.2 | 10,437 | Steady |
| Ind. Conservative | 0 | | | Steady | 0.0 | 0.5 | 4,764 | Steady |
| Independent Labour | 0 | | | Steady | 0.0 | 0.5 | 4,708 | Steady |
| Independent Progressive | 0 | | | Steady | 0.0 | 0.4 | 3,778 | Steady |
| Independent Socialist | 0 | | | Steady | 0.0 | 0.3 | 2,746 | Steady |
| Paisley Local | 0 | | | Steady | 0.0 | 0.1 | 1,043 | Steady |
| Socialist Workers Republican | 0 | | | Steady | 0.0 | 0.0 | 140 | Steady |
| Total | 103 | | | | | | 882,752 | |

== Electoral division results ==
=== Argyll District ===
1. Kintyre
| Party | Candidate | Votes | % |
|---|---|---|---|
| Conservative | J. McCorkindale | 2,520 | 51.6 |
| Labour | D. McMillan | 1,550 | 31.7 |
| Liberal | C. MacEchern | 817 | 16.7 |
| Majority | | 970 | 19.9 |
| Turnout | | 4,887 | 59.5 |
| Conservative win (new seat) | | | |

2. Mid Argyll and Islay
| Party | Candidate | Votes | % |
|---|---|---|---|
| Conservative | A. Jackson | 1,588 | 31.7 |
| Liberal | W. Pollock | 1,402 | 28.0 |
| Independent | F. Spears | 1,075 | 21.5 |
| Labour | J. Stewart | 946 | 18.9 |
| Majority | | 186 | 3.7 |
| Turnout | | 5,011 | 52.4 |
| Conservative win (new seat) | | | |

3. Lorn
| Party | Candidate | Votes | % |
|---|---|---|---|
| Independent | D. Webster | 2,593 | 45.0 |
| Liberal | Janet Michie | 2,229 | 38.7 |
| Labour | G. MacKechnie | 938 | 16.3 |
| Majority | | 364 | 6.3 |
| Turnout | | 5,760 | 55.9 |
| Independent win (new seat) | | | |

4. Bute and West Cowal
| Party | Candidate | Votes | % |
|---|---|---|---|
| Conservative | J. McMillan | 2,968 | 67.9 |
| Independent | D. McIntyre | 762 | 17.4 |
| Labour | H. McGill | 641 | 14.7 |
| Majority | | 2,206 | 50.5 |
| Turnout | | 4,371 | 50.9 |
| Conservative win (new seat) | | | |

5. Dunoon and East Cowal
| Party | Candidate | Votes | % |
|---|---|---|---|
| Conservative | L. Hinge | 1,635 | 29.8 |
| Independent | T. Henderson | 1,350 | 24.6 |
| Independent | T. Crompton | 864 | 15.7 |
| Independent | J. Mackinnon | 735 | 13.4 |
| Independent | T. Trapp | 348 | 11.8 |
| Labour | Isobel Coxon | 262 | 4.8 |
| Majority | | 285 | 5.2 |
| Turnout | | 5,494 | 61.7 |
| Conservative win (new seat) | | | |

=== Dumbarton District ===
6. Dumbarton
| Party | Candidate | Votes | % |
|---|---|---|---|
| Labour | I. Macduff | 6,523 | 65.8 |
| Conservative | J. Miller | 3,398 | 34.4 |
| Majority | | 3,125 | 31.4 |
| Turnout | | 9,921 | 54.5 |
| Labour win | | | |

7. Helensburgh
| Party | Candidate | Votes | % |
|---|---|---|---|
| Independent | W. Petrie | 5,869 | 58.8 |
| Conservative | N. Glen | 3,174 | 31.8 |
| Labour | Gillian Carr | 934 | 9.4 |
| Majority | | 2,695 | 27.0 |
| Turnout | | 9,977 | 60.6 |
| Independent win | | | |

8. Vale of Leven
| Party | Candidate | Votes | % |
|---|---|---|---|
| Labour | M. Haran | 4,867 | 46.1 |
| SNP | W. Dick | 3,444 | 32.6 |
| Conservative | E. Denny | 1,898 | 18.0 |
| Communist | A. Bellingham | 355 | 3.4 |
| Majority | | 1,423 | 13.5 |
| Turnout | | 10,564 | 60.6 |
| Labour win | | | |

=== City of Glasgow District ===
9. Tollcross/ Parkhead
| Party | Candidate | Votes | % |
|---|---|---|---|
| Labour | G. McClure | 5,111 | 50.7 |
| SNP | B. Nugent | 2,498 | 24.8 |
| Conservative | A. Scott | 2,343 | 23.2 |
| Communist | W. Kennedy | 134 | 1.3 |
| Majority | | 2,613 | 25.9 |
| Turnout | | 10,564 | 47.3 |
| Labour win | | | |

10. Carntyne/ Camlachie
| Party | Candidate | Votes | % |
|---|---|---|---|
| Labour | D. Marshall | 4,030 | 57.2 |
| SNP | N. Logan | 1,725 | 24.5 |
| Conservative | R.B May | 1,187 | 16.8 |
| Communist | D. McGregor | 107 | 1.5 |
| Majority | | 2,305 | 32.7 |
| Turnout | | 7,049 | 41.9 |
| Labour win | | | |

11. Easterhouse/ Garthamlock
| Party | Candidate | Votes | % |
|---|---|---|---|
| Labour | T. Fulton | 4,251 | 57.8 |
| SNP | T. Murray | 2,331 | 31.7 |
| Conservative | R.J. Howie | 468 | 6.4 |
| Communist | J. Jackson | 310 | 4.2 |
| Majority | | 1,920 | 26.1 |
| Turnout | | 7,360 | 35.5 |
| Labour win | | | |

12. Wellhouse/ Queenslie
| Party | Candidate | Votes | % |
|---|---|---|---|
| Labour | A.J. Long | 4,402 | 57.6 |
| SNP | W. Lindsay | 2,626 | 34.4 |
| Conservative | G.R. McKay | 501 | 6.6 |
| Communist | K. Haldane | 110 | 1.4 |
| Majority | | 1,776 | 23.2 |
| Turnout | | 7,639 | 45.9 |
| Labour win | | | |

13.Riddrie/ Lethamhill
| Party | Candidate | Votes | % |
|---|---|---|---|
| Labour | Agnes L. Ballantyne | 4,281 | 60.7 |
| SNP | G. Wotherspoon | 2,167 | 27.3 |
| Conservative | G. Bryce | 1,487 | 18.7 |
| Majority | | 2,114 | 33.4 |
| Turnout | | 7,935 | 45.9 |
| Labour win | | | |

14. City/ Townhead
| Party | Candidate | Votes | % |
|---|---|---|---|
| Labour | W. Lindsay | 3,362 | 69.7 |
| Conservative | W.G. Mackay | 734 | 15.2 |
| SNP | J. Gilmer | 726 | 15.1 |
| Majority | | 2,628 | 54.5 |
| Turnout | | 4,822 | 41.0 |
| Labour win | | | |

15.Calton/ Dalmarnock
| Party | Candidate | Votes | % |
|---|---|---|---|
| Labour | T. McLaren | 3,169 | 60.7 |
| SNP | H. MacQueen | 744 | 14.3 |
| Conservative | A. Alexander | 686 | 13.1 |
| Liberal | W. Gibson Knight | 622 | 11.9 |
| Majority | | 2,425 | 46.4 |
| Turnout | | 5,221 | 38.8 |
| Labour win | | | |

16. Balornock/ Robroyston
| Party | Candidate | Votes | % |
|---|---|---|---|
| Labour | P. Trainer | 4,550 | 53.8 |
| SNP | W. Morton | 2,942 | 34.8 |
| Conservative | T. Herriot | 819 | 9.7 |
| Communist | N. McLellan | 146 | 1.7 |
| Majority | | 1,608 | 19.0 |
| Turnout | | 8,457 | 47.4 |
| Labour win | | | |

Ward 17. Cowlairs/ Petershill
| Party | Candidate | Votes | % |
|---|---|---|---|
| Labour | R. Gould | 2,895 | 57.8 |
| SNP | J. Young | 1,483 | 29.6 |
| Conservative | J. Miller | 568 | 11.3 |
| Communist | Jean Maitland | 61 | 1.2 |
| Majority | | 1,412 | 28.2 |
| Turnout | | 5,007 | 42.3 |
| Labour win | | | |

18. Milnbank/ Dennistoun
| Party | Candidate | Votes | % |
|---|---|---|---|
| Labour | P. McEachran | 3,988 | 44.5 |
| Conservative | J.C. Gilbert | 2,644 | 29.5 |
| SNP | J.C. Donaldson | 2,229 | 24.9 |
| Communist | R. Irving | 100 | 1.1 |
| Majority | | 1,344 | 15.0 |
| Turnout | | 8,961 | 49.2 |
| Labour win | | | |

19. Summerston/ Wyndford
| Party | Candidate | Votes | % |
|---|---|---|---|
| Labour | L. McGarry | 4,775 | 66.7 |
| Conservative | S. Taylor | 2,183 | 30.5 |
| Communist | I. Wilson | 203 | 2.8 |
| Majority | | 2,592 | 36.2 |
| Turnout | | 7,161 | 44.3 |
| Labour win | | | |

20. Ruchill/ Milton
| Party | Candidate | Votes | % |
|---|---|---|---|
| Labour | G. McGrath | 4,182 | 53.3 |
| SNP | A. McIntosh | 2,778 | 35.4 |
| Conservative | Harriet Paterson | 778 | 9.9 |
| Communist | M. Meers | 105 | 1.3 |
| Majority | | 1,404 | 17.9 |
| Turnout | | 7,843 | 47.1 |
| Labour win | | | |

21. Possilpark/Cowcaddens
| Party | Candidate | Votes | % |
|---|---|---|---|
| Labour | W. Harley | 4,636 | 59.3 |
| SNP | J. Brown | 2,400 | 30.7 |
| Conservative | A.T. Rennie | 646 | 8.3 |
| Communist | J.O. Foster | 137 | 1.8 |
| Majority | | 1,404 | 28.6 |
| Turnout | | 7,819 | 42.2 |
| Labour win | | | |

22. Botanic Gardens/ Park
| Party | Candidate | Votes | % |
|---|---|---|---|
| Conservative | J.G. Rennie | 3,745 | 58.2 |
| Labour | R. Higgins | 2,692 | 41.8 |
| Majority | | 1,053 | 16.4 |
| Turnout | | 6,437 | 44.6 |
| Conservative win | | | |

23. Kelvin/Woodside
| Party | Candidate | Votes | % |
|---|---|---|---|
| Labour | J. Gray | 2,667 | 49.8 |
| Conservative | Mary Goldie | 1,968 | 36.8 |
| Independent Progressive | W.M. Hutcheson | 476 | 8.9 |
| Scottish Workers Republican Party | W. Montgomery | 140 | 2.6 |
| Communist | P. Noon | 103 | 1.9 |
| Majority | | 699 | 13.0 |
| Turnout | | 4,354 | 45.6 |
| Labour win | | | |

24. Partick East/ Anderston
| Party | Candidate | Votes | % |
|---|---|---|---|
| Labour | M.R. Green | 3,248 | 40.5 |
| Conservative | H.J. McGoldrick | 2,654 | 33.1 |
| SNP | C. Mackellar | 1,930 | 24.1 |
| Communist | W.S. McFall | 179 | 2.2 |
| Majority | | 594 | 7.4 |
| Turnout | | 8,011 | 49.8 |
| Labour win | | | |

25. Anniesland/Kelvinside
| Party | Candidate | Votes | % |
|---|---|---|---|
| Conservative | L.M. Turple | 5,127 | 49.1 |
| Liberal | Louise Steedman | 3,405 | 32.6 |
| Labour | Judith Wilkinson | 972 | 9.3 |
| SNP | Elizabeth A. Robinson | 937 | 9.0 |
| Majority | | 1,722 | 16.5 |
| Turnout | | 10,441 | 56.8 |
| Conservative win | | | |

26. Scotstoun/ Partick West
| Party | Candidate | Votes | % |
|---|---|---|---|
| Conservative | Janet S.B. Browning | 5,331 | 40.2 |
| SNP | J. Hannah | 3,019 | 22.8 |
| Liberal | I. McTavish | 830 | 6.3 |
| Majority | | 1,250 | 17.4 |
| Turnout | | 13,260 | 56.9 |
| Conservative win | | | |

27. Drumry/ Summerhill
| Party | Candidate | Votes | % |
|---|---|---|---|
| Labour | J. Hemphill | 4,282 | 57,4 |
| SNP | I. Cameron | 2,443 | 32.7 |
| Conservative | W. Aitken | 574 | 7.7 |
| Communist | S. Barr | 166 | 2.2 |
| Majority | | 1,839 | 24.7 |
| Turnout | | 7,465 | 41.7 |
| Labour win | | | |

28. Blairdardie/ Knightscliffe
| Party | Candidate | Votes | % |
|---|---|---|---|
| Labour | D. McColl | 3,883 | 42.8 |
| SNP | A. Gorman | 3,019 | 33.3 |
| Conservative | G.A. Kidd | 2,036 | 22.5 |
| Communist | J. Moffat | 129 | 1.4 |
| Majority | | 864 | 9.5 |
| Turnout | | 9,067 | 52.8 |
| Labour win | | | |

29. Yoker/ Knightswood
| Party | Candidate | Votes | % |
|---|---|---|---|
| Labour | W. Perry | 4,866 | 49.1 |
| SNP | R. Thomson | 2,890 | 29.1 |
| Conservative | A. Rogers | 1,965 | 19.8 |
| Communist | P. Morton | 195 | 2.0 |
| Majority | | 1,976 | 20.0 |
| Turnout | | 9,916 | 50.5 |
| Labour win | | | |

30. Gorbals/ Hutchesontown
| Party | Candidate | Votes | % |
|---|---|---|---|
| Labour | J. Wray | 4,760 | 63.3 |
| SNP | G. Baird | 1,523 | 20.2 |
| Conservative | A. Green | 960 | 12.8 |
| Communist | J. Kray | 282 | 3.8 |
| Majority | | 3,237 | 43.1 |
| Turnout | | 7,525 | 40.2 |
| Labour win | | | |

31. Crosshill/ Prospecthill
| Party | Candidate | Votes | % |
|---|---|---|---|
| Labour | G.M. Shaw | 4,508 | 45.4 |
| Conservative | L. Dorfman | 2,748 | 27.6 |
| SNP | D.G. MacKellar | 2,546 | 25.6 |
| Communist | A. Stewart | 139 | 1.4 |
| Majority | | 1,760 | 17.8 |
| Turnout | | 9,941 | 49.7 |
| Labour win | | | |

32. Drumoyne/ Fairfield
| Party | Candidate | Votes | % |
|---|---|---|---|
| Labour | R. McClement | 4,056 | 50.2 |
| SNP | T.M. Wilson | 2,852 | 35.3 |
| Conservative | Christine Brotherston | 1,096 | 13.6 |
| Communist | R. Mitchell | 79 | 1.0 |
| Majority | | 1,204 | 14.9 |
| Turnout | | 8,083 | 49.4 |
| Labour win | | | |

33. Ibrox/ Kingston
| Party | Candidate | Votes | % |
|---|---|---|---|
| Labour | D. Deans | 3,368 | 48.0 |
| SNP | C. McKenna | 2,519 | 33.3 |
| Conservative | D. Sinnott | 1,417 | 18.7 |
| Majority | | 1,119 | 14.7 |
| Turnout | | 7,574 | 48.2 |
| Labour win | | | |

34. Hillington/ Bellahouston
| Party | Candidate | Votes | % |
|---|---|---|---|
| Labour | J.F. McLean | 6,487 | 46.6 |
| Conservative | R. Anderson | 4,756 | 34.2 |
| SNP | Shiela Watterson | 2,510 | 18.0 |
| Communist | G. Neaven | 173 | 1.2 |
| Majority | | 1,731 | 12.4 |
| Turnout | | 13,926 | 57.9 |
| Labour win | | | |

35. Cardonald/ Crookston
| Party | Candidate | Votes | % |
|---|---|---|---|
| Labour | W. Timoney | 5,755 | 53.6 |
| Conservative | M. Reilly | 2,608 | 24.3 |
| SNP | D. McBain | 2,211 | 20.6 |
| Communist | R.M. Rigby | 155 | 1.4 |
| Majority | | 3,147 | 29.3 |
| Turnout | | 7,525 | 40.2 |
| Labour win | | | |

36. Pollockshields/ Strathbungo
| Party | Candidate | Votes | % |
|---|---|---|---|
| Conservative | J. Mair | 5,720 | 55.9 |
| Labour | E. Clark | 2,059 | 21.8 |
| SNP | G. Leslie | 1,757 | 18.6 |
| Liberal | W.C. Todd | 347 | 3.7 |
| Majority | | 3,211 | 34.1 |
| Turnout | | 9,433 | 52.5 |
| Conservative win | | | |

37. Camphill/ Pollockshaws
| Party | Candidate | Votes | % |
|---|---|---|---|
| Conservative | Anna Douglas | 4,576 | 40.9 |
| Labour | J.D. Cannell | 3,766 | 33.7 |
| SNP | R. Hamilton | 2,200 | 19.7 |
| Liberal | R. McIntyre | 562 | 5.0 |
| Communist | A. Elliot | 72 | 0.6 |
| Majority | | 810 | 7.2 |
| Turnout | | 11,176 | 57.5 |
| Conservative win | | | |

38. Nitshill/ Darnley
| Party | Candidate | Votes | % |
|---|---|---|---|
| Labour | Jean Craig | 6,071 | 61.4 |
| SNP | D. Murchie | 2,759 | 27.9 |
| Conservative | Jan Goudie | 873 | 8.8 |
| Communist | G. Currie | 181 | 1.8 |
| Majority | | 3,312 | 33.5 |
| Turnout | | 9,884 | 44.9 |
| Labour win | | | |

39. Newlands/ Mt.Florida
| Party | Candidate | Votes | % |
|---|---|---|---|
| Conservative | J. Hicks | 6,867 | 73.8 |
| Labour | H. McEachan | 2,443 | 26.2 |
| Majority | | 4,424 | 47.6 |
| Turnout | | 9,310 | 60.6 |
| Conservative win | | | |

40. Kings Park/ Castlemilk
| Party | Candidate | Votes | % |
|---|---|---|---|
| Labour | T. Muir | 3,668 | 41.0 |
| Conservative | N.D. Smith | 3,501 | 39.2 |
| SNP | A. Carmichael | 1,339 | 15.0 |
| Liberal | Christine Forest | 326 | 3.7 |
| Communist | L. Raeburn | 108 | 1.2 |
| Majority | | 167 | 1.8 |
| Turnout | | 8,942 | 50.9 |
| Labour win | | | |

41. Linn/ Cathkin
| Party | Candidate | Votes | % |
|---|---|---|---|
| Labour | J. Fitch | 4,148 | 50.8 |
| Conservative | Christine MacInnes | 2,709 | 24.3 |
| SNP | A. Ogg | 1,169 | 14.3 |
| Communist | A. Hamilton | 135 | 1.7 |
| Majority | | 1,439 | 17.6 |
| Turnout | | 8,161 | 48.5 |
| Labour win | | | |

42. Rutherglen
| Party | Candidate | Votes | % |
|---|---|---|---|
| Labour | D. Walker | 4,324 | 40.6 |
| Conservative | Janet W. Nairn | 3,797 | 35.6 |
| SNP | Heather Ewing | 2,538 | 23.8 |
| Majority | | 527 | 5.0 |
| Turnout | | 10,659 | 55.7 |
| Labour win | | | |

43. Baillieston
| Party | Candidate | Votes | % |
|---|---|---|---|
| Labour | C. McNicol | 4,895 | 52.3 |
| Conservative | H. Clark | 4,469 | 47.7 |
| Majority | | 426 | 4.6 |
| Turnout | | 9,364 | 52.6 |
| Labour win | | | |

44. Cambuslang
| Party | Candidate | Votes | % |
|---|---|---|---|
| Conservative | Bunty Gunn | 6,404 | 45.4 |
| Labour | J. Aiton | 5,211 | 36.9 |
| SNP | Christine Latta | 2,502 | 17.7 |
| Majority | | 1,193 | 8.5 |
| Turnout | | 14,117 | 56.6 |
| Conservative win | | | |

=== Clydebank District ===
45. Clydebank & Kilpatrick South
| Party | Candidate | Votes | % |
|---|---|---|---|
| Labour | M. Turner | 6,300 | 54.3 |
| SNP | D. McKenzie | 4,700 | 40.5 |
| Communist | E. Kelly | 606 | 5.2 |
| Majority | | 1,600 | 13.8 |
| Turnout | | 11,606 | 55.8 |
| Labour win | | | |

46. Clydebank & Kilpatrick North
| Party | Candidate | Votes | % |
|---|---|---|---|
| Labour | W. Worthington | 5,820 | 49.2 |
| Independent Progressive | A. Lawson | 3,302 | 27.9 |
| Communist | J. Reid | 2,700 | 22.8 |
| Majority | | 2,518 | 21.3 |
| Turnout | | 11,822 | 60.7 |
| Labour win | | | |

=== Bearsden & Milngavie District ===
47. Milngavie/ Kilmardinny
| Party | Candidate | Votes | % |
|---|---|---|---|
| Independent | J.G. Breckenridge | 3,304 | 42.0 |
| Conservative | A.I. McAlpine | 2,606 | 33.1 |
| Labour | R.E. Black | 1,416 | 18.0 |
| Liberal | T.C. Harvey | 545 | 6.9 |
| Majority | | 698 | 8.9 |
| Turnout | | 7,861 | 66.2 |
| Independent win | | | |

48. Bearsden
| Party | Candidate | Votes | % |
|---|---|---|---|
| Conservative | W. Boyle | 5,149 | 59.3 |
| Independent | J.F. Doig | 2,585 | 29.8 |
| Liberal | J.A. Thompson | 956 | 11.0 |
| Majority | | 2,564 | 29.5 |
| Turnout | | 8,690 | 61.1 |
| Conservative win | | | |

=== Bishopbriggs & Kirkintilloch District ===
49. Kirkintilloch
| Party | Candidate | Votes | % |
|---|---|---|---|
| SNP | J. Lucas | 4,169 | 36.8 |
| Labour | E. McGaughrin | 3,502 | 30.9 |
| Conservative | D. Donovan | 2,824 | 24.9 |
| Liberal | Marguerite Turcan | 836 | 7.4 |
| Majority | | 667 | 5.9 |
| Turnout | | 11,331 | 64.8 |
| SNP win | | | |

50. Bishopbriggs
| Party | Candidate | Votes | % |
|---|---|---|---|
| Independent | J. Proctor | 3,538 | 32.9 |
| Labour | G. Scobie | 2,740 | 25.5 |
| Conservative | N. McCune | 2,264 | 21.1 |
| SNP | G. Paterson | 2,199 | 20.5 |
| Majority | | 798 | 7.4 |
| Turnout | | 10,741 | 61.1 |
| Independent win | | | |

51. Chryston & Kelvin Valley
| Party | Candidate | Votes | % |
|---|---|---|---|
| Labour | C. Gray | 5,223 | 50.7 |
| SNP | Esther McKean | 5,086 | 49.3 |
| Majority | | 137 | 1.4 |
| Turnout | | 10,309 | 63.3 |
| Labour win | | | |

=== Cumbernauld District ===
52. Cumbernauld South & East
| Party | Candidate | Votes | % |
|---|---|---|---|
| SNP | G. Murray | 5,268 | 56.3 |
| Labour | Agnes McLean | 4,088 | 43.7 |
| Majority | | 1,180 | 12.6 |
| Turnout | | 9,356 | 57.6 |
| SNP win | | | |

Kilsyth & Cumbernauld North West
| Party | Candidate | Votes | % |
|---|---|---|---|
| SNP | Janette Jones | 4,651 | 50.5 |
| Labour | A. Houston | 4,128 | 44.9 |
| Liberal | C. Hall | 424 | 4.6 |
| Majority | | 523 | 5.6 |
| Turnout | | 9,203 | 58.9 |
| SNP win | | | |

=== Monklands District ===
54. Coatbridge West
| Party | Candidate | Votes | % |
|---|---|---|---|
| Labour | J. Whelan | 5,577 | 55.2 |
| Conservative | Florence Inglis | 4,529 | 44.8 |
| Majority | | 1,048 | 10.4 |
| Turnout | | 10,106 | 55.1 |
| Labour win | | | |

55. Coatbridge East
| Party | Candidate | Votes | % |
|---|---|---|---|
| Labour | Charlotte Toal | 3,981 | 47.2 |
| Conservative | G. Hill | 2,676 | 31.7 |
| Independent Labour | H. Hendrie | 1,785 | 21.1 |
| Majority | | 1,305 | 15.5 |
| Turnout | | 8,442 | 53.4 |
| Labour win | | | |

56. Airdrie East
| Party | Candidate | Votes | % |
|---|---|---|---|
| Labour | R. Stewart | 4,482 | 39.1 |
| Conservative | J. Crichton | 3,512 | 30.7 |
| Independent | J. Brunton | 1,986 | 17.3 |
| SNP | J. Russell | 1,480 | 12.9 |
| Majority | | 970 | 8.4 |
| Turnout | | 11,460 | 60.0 |
| Labour win | | | |

57. Airdrie West
| Party | Candidate | Votes | % |
|---|---|---|---|
| Labour | J. Donnelly | 5,141 | 54.0 |
| Conservative | J. Murdoch | 4,378 | 46.0 |
| Majority | | 763 | 8.0 |
| Turnout | | 9,519 | 48.4 |
| Labour win | | | |

=== Motherwell District ===
58. Dalziel
| Party | Candidate | Votes | % |
|---|---|---|---|
| Labour | B. Scott | 4,816 | 47.8 |
| Conservative | E.C. Houston | 3,337 | 33.1 |
| Communist | J. Sneddon | 1,928 | 19.1 |
| Majority | | 1,479 | 14.7 |
| Turnout | | 10,071 | 50.5 |
| Labour win | | | |

59. Wishaw
| Party | Candidate | Votes | % |
|---|---|---|---|
| Labour | J. Gibson | 4,424 | 59.3 |
| Conservative | M. Morrison | 3,032 | 40.7 |
| Majority | | 1,392 | 18.6 |
| Turnout | | 7,456 | 43.9 |
| Labour win | | | |

60. Clydevale
| Party | Candidate | Votes | % |
|---|---|---|---|
| Labour | J. Fyfe | 4,873 | 63.8 |
| Conservative | T. Lannigan | 2,760 | 36.2 |
| Majority | | 2,113 | 27.6 |
| Turnout | | 7,633 | 46.2 |
| Labour win | | | |

61. Fortissat
| Party | Candidate | Votes | % |
|---|---|---|---|
| Labour | J. Burns | Unopposed | N/A |
| Majority | | N/A | N/A |
| Turnout | | N/A | N/A |
| Labour win | | | |

62. Bellshill & Tannochside
| Party | Candidate | Votes | % |
|---|---|---|---|
| Labour | R. Stewart | 4,482 | 39.1 |
| Conservative | J. Crichton | 3,512 | 30.7 |
| Independent | J. Brunton | 1,986 | 17.3 |
| SNP | J. Russell | 1,480 | 12.9 |
| Majority | | 970 | 8.4 |
| Turnout | | 11,460 | 60.0 |
| Labour win | | | |

63. Clydesdale
| Party | Candidate | Votes | % |
|---|---|---|---|
| Labour | E. Myles | 4,870 | 54.2 |
| SNP | R. Hendrie | 2,746 | 30.5 |
| Conservative | M. Jeffrey | 966 | 10.7 |
| Communist | D. Bolton | 410 | 4.6 |
| Majority | | 2,124 | 23.7 |
| Turnout | | 8,992 | 49.1 |
| Labour win | | | |

=== Kilmarnock North ===
Kilmarnock North
| Party | Candidate | Votes | % |
|---|---|---|---|
| Labour | J. Hunter | 5,541 | 59.2 |
| Conservative | R. Ledgerwood | 2,310 | 24.7 |
| Liberal | A. Korn | 1,076 | 11.5 |
| Independent Labour | B. Mitchell | 429 | 4.6 |
| Majority | | 3,231 | 34.5 |
| Turnout | | 9,356 | 45.9 |
| Registered electors | | 20,616 | |
| Labour win (new seat) | | | |

=== Kilmarnock South ===
Kilmarnock South
| Party | Candidate | Votes | % |
|---|---|---|---|
| Labour | W. McCulloch | 4,673 | 47.2 |
| Conservative | W. Adams | 4,067 | 41.1 |
| Liberal | N. Tosh | 1,154 | 11.7 |
| Majority | | 606 | 6.1 |
| Turnout | | 9,894 | 50.6 |
| Registered electors | | 19,746 | |
| Labour win (new seat) | | | |

=== Stewarton and Irvine Valley ===
Stewarton and Irvine Valley
| Party | Candidate | Votes | % |
|---|---|---|---|
| Labour | J. McChristie | 5,927 | 55.1 |
| Conservative | A. Foote | 2,912 | 27.1 |
| Liberal | A. Wight | 1,917 | 17.8 |
| Majority | | 3,015 | 28.0 |
| Turnout | | 10,756 | 53.5 |
| Registered electors | | 20,281 | |
| Labour win (new seat) | | | |

=== Cumnock ===
Cumnock
| Party | Candidate | Votes | % |
|---|---|---|---|
| Labour | W. Paterson | Unopposed | |
| Registered electors | | 16,182 | |
| Labour win (new seat) | | | |

=== New Cumnock and Doon Valley ===
New Cumnock and Doon Valley
| Party | Candidate | Votes | % |
|---|---|---|---|
| Labour | W. Goudie | Unopposed | |
| Registered electors | | 17,684 | |
| Labour win (new seat) | | | |
