= Strathclyde =

Former local government region of Scotland

Coordinates: 55°44′N 5°02′W

Strathclyde Srath Chluaidh
- Former Region

- Area
- 1,350,283 hectares (3,336,620 acres)
- Population
- c. 2,286,800
- History
  - Origin: Local Government (Scotland) Act 1973
  - Created: 16 May 1975
  - Abolished: 31 March 1996
  - Succeeded by: Argyll and Bute; East Ayrshire; East Dunbartonshire; East Renfrewshire; Glasgow City Council; Inverclyde; North Ayrshire; North Lanarkshire; Renfrewshire; South Ayrshire; South Lanarkshire; West Dunbartonshire
- Government: Strathclyde Regional Council
  - Type: Regional Council
  - HQ: Strathclyde House, India Street, Glasgow

Strathclyde (Srath Chluaidh [s̪t̪ɾa ˈxl̪ˠɯi] in Gaelic, meaning 'strath [valley] of the River Clyde') was one of nine former local government regions of Scotland created in 1975 by the Local Government (Scotland) Act 1973 and abolished in 1996 by the Local Government etc. (Scotland) Act 1994. The Strathclyde region had 19 districts. The region was named after the early medieval Kingdom of Strathclyde centred on Govan, but covered a broader geographic area than its namesake by including Argyll and various Western islands in addition to its Southwestern core.

== History ==
The Strathclyde region was created in 1975 under the Local Government (Scotland) Act 1973, which established a two-tier structure of local government across Scotland comprising upper-tier regions and lower-tier districts. Strathclyde covered the whole area of six counties and parts of another two, which were all abolished for local government purposes at the same time:

- Argyll (except Ardnamurchan District and the electoral divisions of Ballachulish and Kinlochleven)
- Ayrshire
- Buteshire
- Dunbartonshire
- Glasgow
- Lanarkshire
- Renfrewshire
- Stirlingshire (part, being the burgh of Kilsyth, Western No. 3 District, the electoral division of Kilsyth West, and the polling district of Kilsyth East (Banton))

The region was named after the ancient British or Brythonic Damnonii Kingdom of Strathclyde. The kingdom had broadly covered the southern part of the local government region created in 1975, thus with the Argyll and Buteshire parts not having been within the ancient kingdom. Conversely, the kingdom had included areas further to the south, which were never part of the post-1975 Strathclyde (Dumfries and Galloway, as well as Cumbria in England).

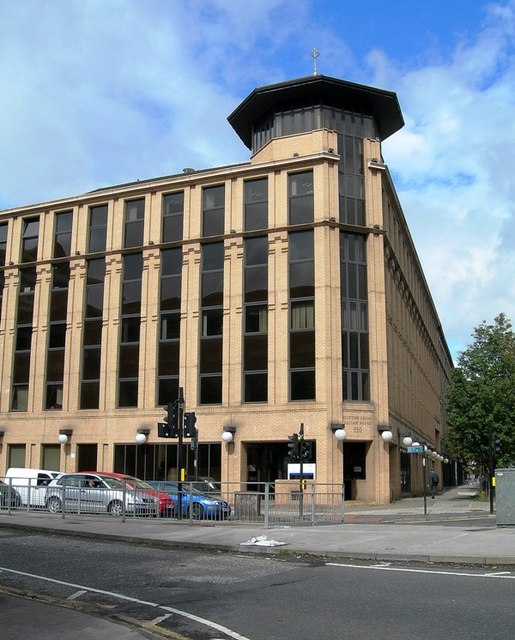
Strathclyde Regional Council's Education Department on the corner of St Vincent Street and North Street

Strathclyde Regional Council was responsible for education, social work, police, fire, sewage, strategic planning, roads, and transport. It employed almost 100,000 public servants, almost half of whom were teachers, lecturers and others in the education service.

Strathclyde region was abolished in 1996 under the Local Government etc. (Scotland) Act 1994 which replaced regions and districts with unitary council areas. The region was divided into twelve council areas: Argyll and Bute, East Ayrshire, East Dunbartonshire, East Renfrewshire, Glasgow City (created as City of Glasgow), Inverclyde, North Ayrshire, North Lanarkshire, Renfrewshire, South Ayrshire, South Lanarkshire, and West Dunbartonshire (created as Dumbarton and Clydebank)

== Geography ==
The Strathclyde region was on the west coast of Scotland and stretched from the Highlands in the north to the Southern Uplands in the south. It included some of the Inner Hebrides in the north-west but also contained Scotland's largest urban area of Glasgow. As a local government region, its population, in excess of 2.5 million, was by far the largest of the regions and contained half of the population of Scotland.

== Political control ==
Politics in the region were dominated by the Labour Party. The first regional council convener was the Reverend Geoff Shaw, who died in 1978. It was largely due to his leadership that the regional council forged its innovative strategy on multiple deprivation, which remained its central commitment to the end of the region's life through "Social Strategy for the Eighties" (1982) and "SS for the 90s".

The first election to Strathclyde Regional Council was held in 1974, initially operating as a shadow authority alongside the outgoing authorities until the new system came into force on 16 May 1975. Throughout the council's existence Labour held a majority of the seats:

Party in control	Years
Labour	1975–1996

=== Leadership ===
The council had two main leadership roles: a convener who acted as ceremonial head and presided at council meetings, and a leader of the council to provide political leadership.

Conveners

Councillor	Party	From	To
Geoff Shaw	Labour	16 May 1975	28 Apr 1978
Charles O'Halloran	Labour	May 1978	May 1982
James Burns	Labour	May 1982	May 1986
James Jennings	Labour	May 1986	May 1990
David Sanderson	Labour	May 1990	May 1994
William Perry	Labour	May 1994	Mar 1996

Leaders

Councillor	Party	From	To
Dick Stewart	Labour	16 May 1975	30 Apr 1986
Charles Gray	Labour	May 1986	1 Jun 1992
Bob Gould	Labour	1 Jun 1992	31 Mar 1996

Bob Gould became the leader of the reformed Glasgow City Council on the abolition of the regional council in 1996.

=== Elections ===
Elections were held every four years.

Year	Seats	Labour	SNP	Liberal Democrats (Note: Liberals prior to 1988.)	Conservative	Independent / Other	Notes
1974	103	71	5	2	20	5	
1978	103	73	2	2	25	1	
1982	103	79	3	4	15	2	
1986	103	87	2	5	6	3	
1990	103	90	1	4	5	3	
1994	104	86	7	4	3	2	New ward boundaries.

=== District result maps ===
1982 results map

1986 results map

1990 results map

1994 results map

== Premises ==
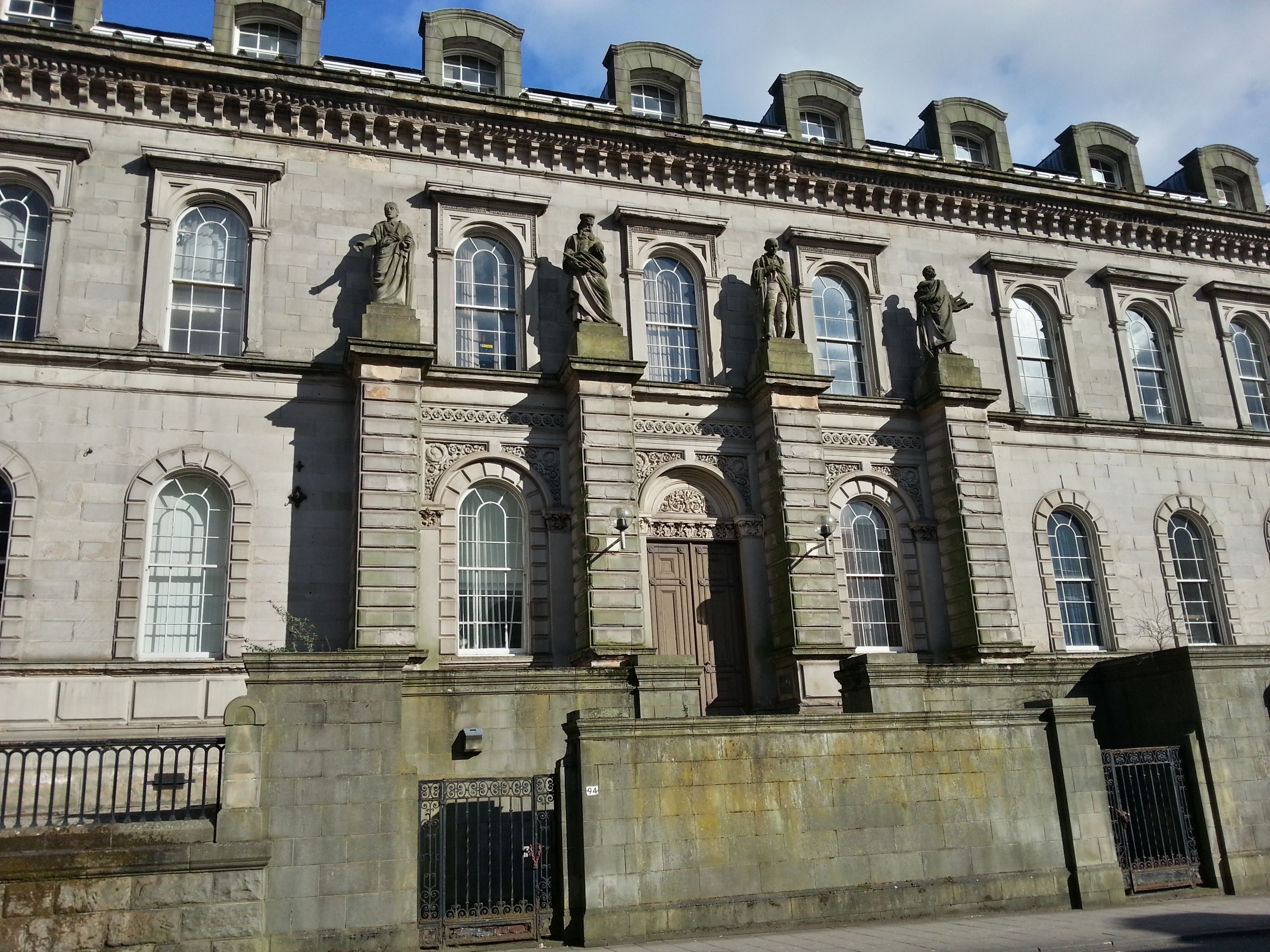
Main building of old High School (built 1846), became part of Strathclyde House, the council's headquarters.

The council initially rented offices called Melrose House at 19 Cadogan Street in Glasgow to act as an interim headquarters pending a decision being taken on a permanent headquarters. Various other offices around the centre of Glasgow were also used for additional office space, notably on India Street (the Glasgow City Chambers was not used by the regional administration and was instead the headquarters for the Glasgow district). In 1976, the nearby former Glasgow High School buildings at 94 Elmbank Street were vacated. The council converted the former school buildings to become its headquarters, using the school's dining room block of 1897 to become a council chamber, whilst using the India Street offices as additional accommodation. The remodelled school and neighbouring offices were formally opened by Elizabeth II on 2 November 1979, when the whole complex of eleven buildings was collectively renamed "Strathclyde House".

After the council's abolition several of the modern office buildings which made up Strathclyde House were gradually sold off for redevelopment. The old High School buildings, which are category A listed buildings, were used by Glasgow City Council as additional office space. The council chamber there was briefly used in 2000 by the Scottish Parliament, whilst its new permanent home at Holyrood was under construction and the temporary buildings in Edinburgh were booked out. Glasgow City Council sold the old High School buildings in 2010 but a new use has yet to be found for them. By 2024, all of the 1960s/70s-era buildings of the complex had been demolished; part of the site being used for a new headquarters building for Scottish Power whilst various residential developments have been proposed for the remainder.

== Emergency services ==
Until April 2013, the area was also used as a police force area, covered by Strathclyde Police, and a fire service area, covered by Strathclyde Fire and Rescue Service. Both have now been replaced by single services (Police Scotland and Scottish Fire and Rescue Service).

== Transport ==
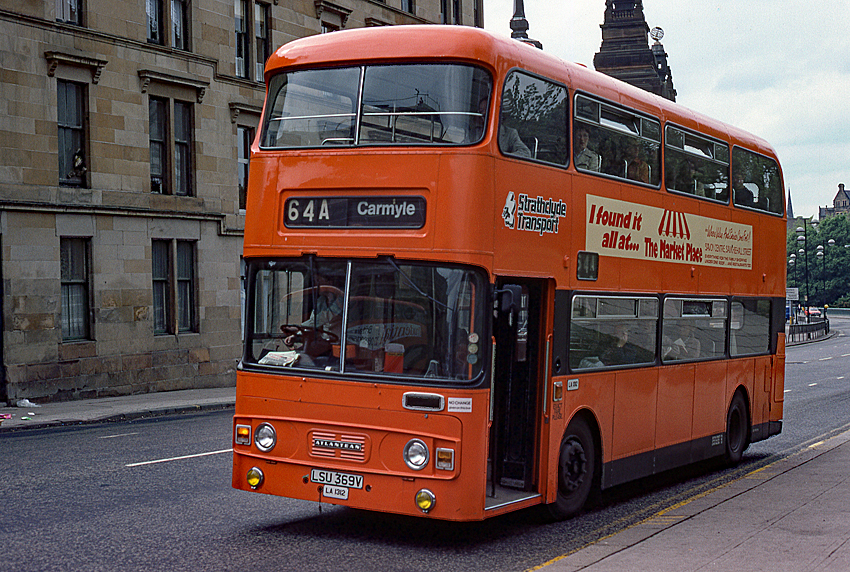
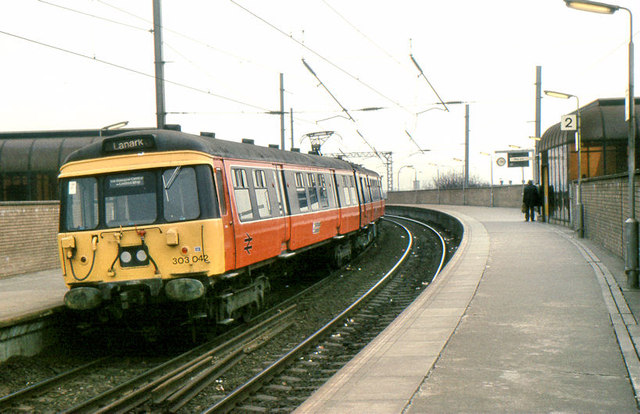
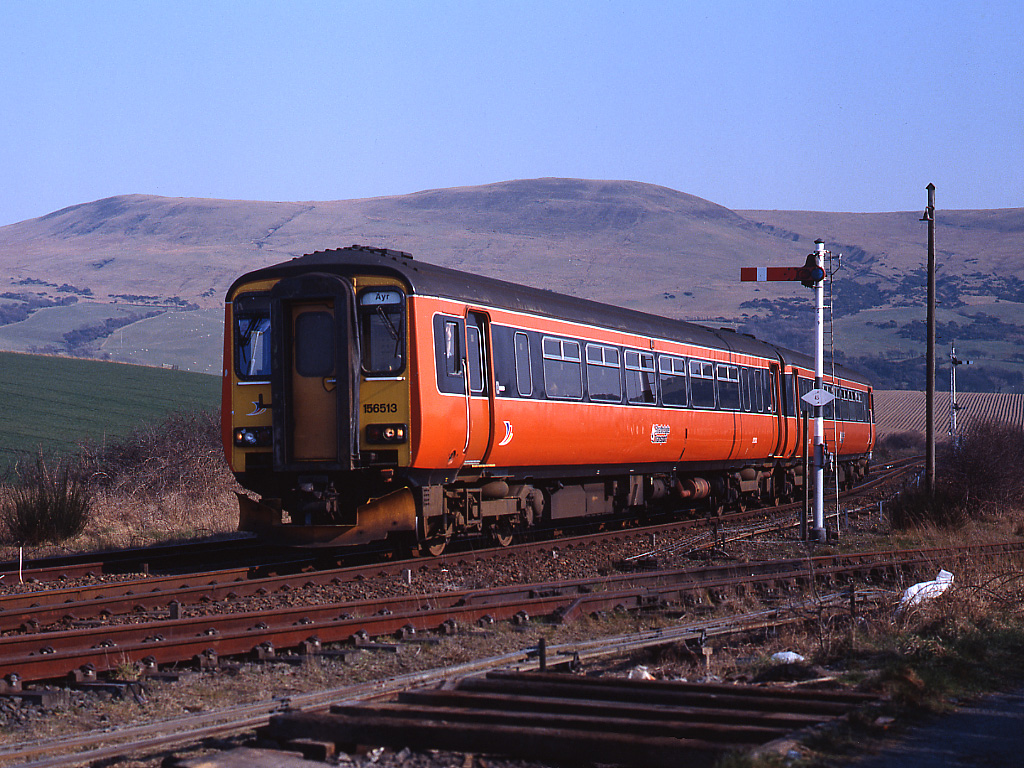
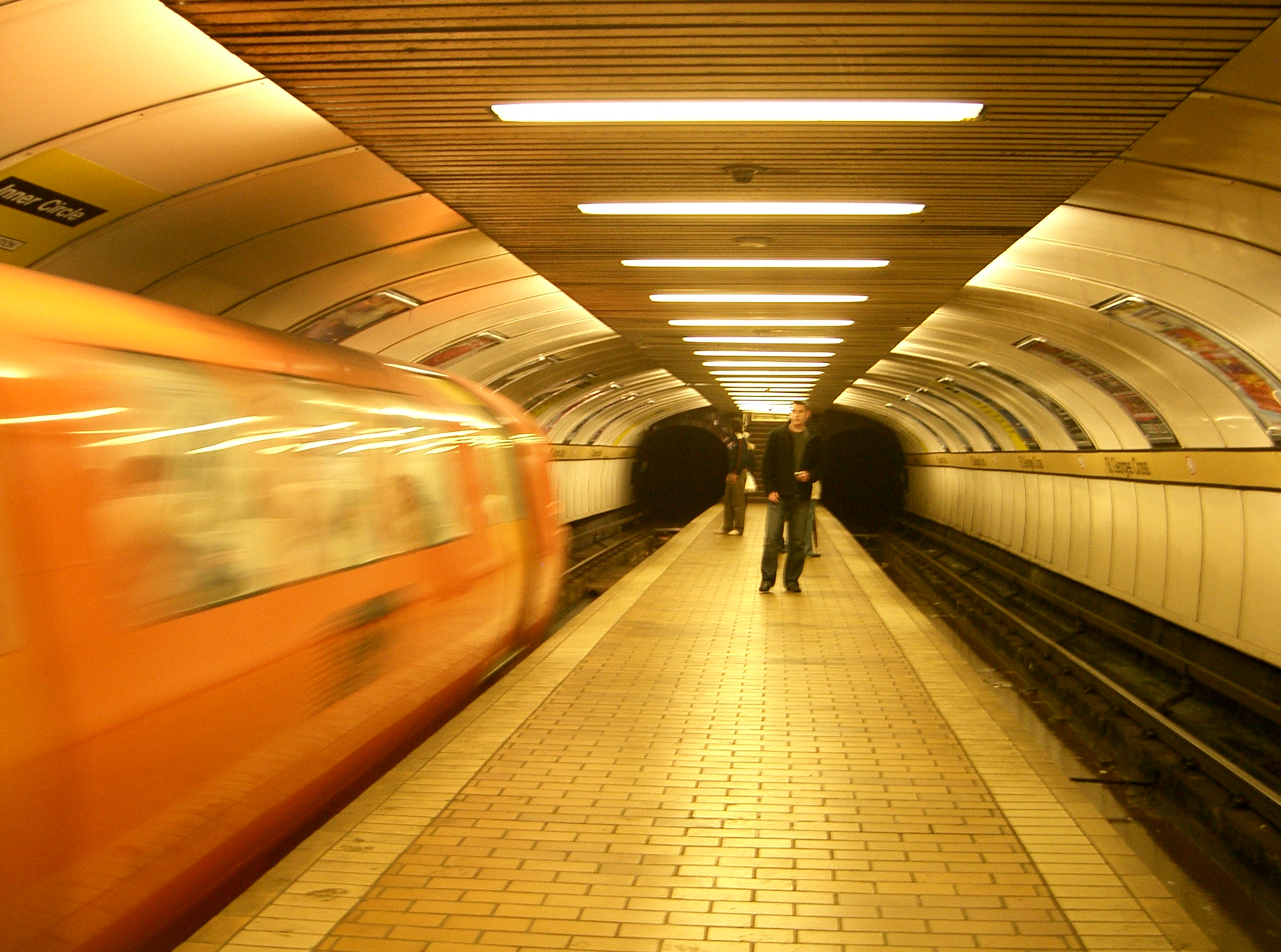
Strathclyde Transport

Originally known as Strathclyde Transport and later as SPT, a name still in use today, Strathclyde Transport managed transportation services for the region running rail services in Strathclyde in partnership with British Rail and later the ScotRail Franchise holder. Strathclyde Transport also ran busses in the region under the brand Strathclyde Buses up until bus deregulation in 1986, as well running the Glasgow subway, the third oldest underground system in the world. Strathclyde Transport also was involved in transport projects for the region some examples include:

- The re-opening of the Argyle Line
- The 1994 Strathclyde Tram proposal

Strathclyde Transport also administered the ZoneCard integrated ticketing system as well as many other tickets to encourage intermodal travel and an integrated ticketing system, with Zonecard still remaining today. The SPT name is still in use today as a transport area, covered by Strathclyde Partnership for Transport. The area covered by Strathclyde Partnership for Transport and previously Strathclyde Passenger Transport is smaller than the original Strathclyde region, as most of Argyll and Bute now lies outside its remit.

== Sub-regions and districts ==
Except for Argyll and Bute and the City of Glasgow, the 19 districts were grouped to form 'sub-regions' or 'divisions', each named after a historic county. The Argyll and Bute district and the City of Glasgow district were sub-regions in their own right, and Argyll and Bute was named after two counties.

Sub-region	District or districts	Composition in terms of counties, burghs, and other areas specified by the 1973 Act
Argyll and Bute	Argyll and Bute	In county of Argyll: burghs of Campbeltown, Dunoon, Inveraray, Lochgilphead, Oban, and Tobermory; and districts of Cowal, Islay, Jura and Colonsay, Kintyre, Mid Argyll, Mull, North Lorn except the electoral divisions of Ballachulish and Kinlochleven, South Lorn, and Tiree and Coll In county of Bute: burgh of Rothesay; and district of Bute
Ayr	Cumnock and Doon Valley	In county of Ayr: burgh of Cumnock and Holmhead; and districts of Cumnock and Dalmellington except that part of parish of Ayr within this district and polling district of Coylton
Ayr	Cunninghame	In county of Ayr: burghs of Ardrossan, Irvine, Kilwinning, Largs, Saltcoats, and Stevenston; districts of Irvine, Kilbirnie, and West Kilbride, and those parts of Irvine New Town within districts of Ayr and Kilmarnock In county of Bute: burgh of Millport; and districts of Arran, and Cumbrae
Ayr	Kilmarnock and Loudoun	In county of Ayr: burghs of Darvel, Galston, Kilmarnock, Newmilns and Greenholm, and Stewarton; and district of Kilmarnock except that part of Irvine New Town within this district
Ayr	Kyle and Carrick	In county of Ayr: burghs of Ayr, Girvan, Maybole, Prestwick, and Troon; districts of Ayr except that part of Irvine New Town within this district, Girvan, and Maybole, that part of parish of Ayr within the district of Dalmellington; and polling district of Coylton
Dunbarton	Bearsden and Milngavie	In county of Dunbarton: burghs of Bearsden and Milngavie; and that part of electoral division of Hardgate within parish of New Kilpatrick
Dunbarton	Clydebank	In county of Dunbarton: burgh of Clydebank; and district of Old Kilpatrick except electoral divisions of Bowling and Dunbarton and that part of electoral division of Hardgate within parish of New Kilpatrick
Dunbarton	Cumbernauld and Kilsyth	In county of Dunbarton: burgh of Cumbernauld; electoral division of Croy and Dullatur and those parts of electoral divisions of Twechar and Waterside within Cumbernauld New Town In county of Stirling: burgh of Kilsyth; electoral division of Kilsyth West; and polling district of Kilsyth East (Banton)
Dunbarton	Dumbarton	In county of Dunbarton: burghs of Dumbarton, Cove and Kilcreggan, and Helensburgh; districts of Helensburgh, and Vale of Leven; and electoral divisions of Bowling and Dunbarton
Dunbarton	Strathkelvin	In county of Dunbarton: burgh of Kirkintilloch; and those parts of the electoral divisions of Twechar and Waterside outwith Cumbernauld New Town In county of Lanark: burgh of Bishopbriggs; and electoral divisions of Chryston and Stepps; In county of Stirling: Western No 3 district
Glasgow	City of Glasgow	County of city of Glasgow In county of Lanark: burgh of Rutherglen; and parts of the Eighth district (electoral divisions of Bankhead, Cambuslang Central, Cambuslang North, Hallside, and Rutherglen, and those parts of Cambuslang South and Carmunnock electoral divisions outwith East Kilbride New Town) and the Ninth district (electoral divisions of Baillieston, Garrowhill, Mount Vernon and Carmyle, and Springboig)
Lanark	Clydesdale	In county of Lanark: burghs of Biggar, and Lanark; and First, Second, and Third districts
Lanark	East Kilbride	In county of Lanark: burgh of East Kilbride; in Fourth district, electoral division of Avondale and, in Eighth district, those parts of High Blantyre, Cambuslang South, and Carmunnock electoral divisions within East Kilbride New Town
Lanark	Hamilton	In county of Lanark: burgh of Hamilton; Fourth district except electoral division of Avondale, in the Sixth district, electoral divisions of Bothwell and Uddingston South, and Uddingston North and, in Eighth district, electoral divisions of Blantyre, and Stonefield, and that part of High Blantyre electoral division outwith East Kilbride New Town.
Lanark	Monklands	In county of Lanark: burghs of Airdrie, and Coatbridge; Ninth district except electoral divisions of Baillieston, Chryston, Garrowhill, Mount Vernon and Carmyle, Springboig, and Stepps and, in Seventh district, electoral division of Shottskirk
Lanark	Motherwell	In county of Lanark: burgh of Motherwell and Wishaw; Sixth district except electoral divisions of Bothwell and Uddingston South, and Uddingston North and Seventh district except electoral division of Shottskirk
Renfrew	Eastwood	In county of Renfrew: First district
Renfrew	Renfrew	In county of Renfrew: burghs of Barrhead, Johnstone, Paisley, and Renfrew; and Second, Third, and Fourth districts
Renfrew	Inverclyde	In county of Renfrew: burghs of Gourock, Greenock, Port Glasgow; and Fifth district

== Successor Council Areas ==
Council area	Composition in terms of districts and other areas specified by the 1994 Act
Argyll and Bute	Argyll and Bute district and part of Dumbarton district (Helensburgh (7) regional electoral division and part of Vale of Leven (8) regional electoral division)
East Ayrshire	Kilmarnock and Loudoun and Cumnock and Doon Valley districts
East Dunbartonshire	Bearsden and Milngavie district and part of Strathkelvin district (Kirkintilloch (43), Strathkelvin North (44) and Bishopbriggs (45) regional electoral divisions and South Lenzie/Waterside district ward)
East Renfrewshire	Eastwood district and part of Renfrew district (Barrhead (79) regional electoral division)
Glasgow City (created as City of Glasgow)	City of Glasgow district except Rutherglen/Fernhill (37) and Cambuslang/Halfway (38) regional electoral divisions and part of King's Park/Toryglen (35) regional electoral division
Inverclyde	Inverclyde district
North Ayrshire	Cunninghame district
North Lanarkshire	Cumbernauld and Kilsyth, Monklands, Motherwell districts and part of Strathkelvin district (Chryston (46) regional electoral division except South Lenzie/Waterside district ward)
Renfrewshire	Renfrew district except Barrhead (79) regional electoral division
South Ayrshire	Kyle and Carrick district
South Lanarkshire	Clydesdale, East Kilbride, and Hamilton districts and part of City of Glasgow district (Rutherglen/Fernhill (37) and Cambuslang/Halfway (38) regional electoral divisions and part of King's Park/Toryglen (35) regional electoral division)
West Dunbartonshire (created as Dumbarton and Clydebank)	Clydebank and part of Dumbarton (Dumbarton (6) regional electoral division and part of Vale of Leven (8) regional electoral division)

== See also ==
- Glasgow (European Parliament constituency)
- Strathclyde East (European Parliament constituency)
- Strathclyde West (European Parliament constituency)
- Strathclyde Park, in Motherwell, created during the era
- University of Strathclyde, in Glasgow
