= Hertsmere Borough Council elections =

Local government elections in Hertfordshire, England

Hertsmere Borough Council elections are held every four years to elect members of Hertsmere Borough Council in Hertfordshire, England. Since the last boundary changes in 2019, the council comprises 39 councillors elected from 16 wards.

== Council elections ==
Composition of the council
| Year | Conservative | Labour | Liberal Democrats (Note: Includes totals for the predecessors of the Liberal Democrats, the Liberal Party and SDP (both of which participated in the Alliance).) | Independents & Others | Council control after election |
|---|---|---|---|---|---|
Local government reorganisation; council established (55 seats)
| 1973 | 26 | 17 | 12 | 0 | No overall control |
New ward boundaries (39 seats)
| 1976 | 25 | 10 | 4 | 0 | Conservative |
| 1978 | 25 | 10 | 4 | 0 | Conservative |
| 1979 | 24 | 11 | 4 | 0 | Conservative |
| 1980 | 22 | 12 | 5 | 0 | Conservative |
| 1982 | 21 | 12 | 6 | 0 | Conservative |
| 1983 | 21 | 12 | 6 | 0 | Conservative |
| 1984 | 23 | 12 | 4 | 0 | Conservative |
| 1986 | 22 | 12 | 5 | 0 | Conservative |
| 1987 | 22 | 12 | 5 | 0 | Conservative |
| 1988 | 22 | 12 | 5 | 0 | Conservative |
| 1990 | 22 | 12 | 4 | 1 | Conservative |
| 1991 | 22 | 12 | 4 | 1 | Conservative |
| 1992 | 23 | 12 | 3 | 1 | Conservative |
| 1994 | 19 | 14 | 5 | 1 | No overall control |
| 1995 | 14 | 19 | 5 | 1 | No overall control |
| 1996 | 8 | 22 | 8 | 1 | Labour |
| 1998 | 11 | 22 | 6 | 0 | Labour |
New ward boundaries (39 seats)
| 1999 | 20 | 13 | 6 | 0 | Conservative |
| 2000 | 22 | 13 | 6 | 0 | Conservative |
| 2002 | 24 | 9 | 5 | 1 | Conservative |
| 2003 | 25 | 8 | 6 | 0 | Conservative |
| 2004 | 25 | 7 | 7 | 0 | Conservative |
| 2006 | 28 | 5 | 6 | 0 | Conservative |
| 2007 | 28 | 5 | 6 | 0 | Conservative |
| 2008 | 31 | 3 | 5 | 0 | Conservative |
| 2010 | 34 | 3 | 2 | 0 | Conservative |
| 2011 | 35 | 4 | 0 | 0 | Conservative |
| 2012 | 34 | 5 | 0 | 0 | Conservative |
| 2014 | 34 | 5 | 0 | 0 | Conservative |
| 2015 | 37 | 2 | 0 | 0 | Conservative |
New ward boundaries (39 seats)
| 2019 | 29 | 7 | 3 | 0 | Conservative |
| 2023 | 16 | 14 | 9 | 0 | No overall control |

== Borough result maps ==
=== 1976 boundaries ===
1976 results map

1978 results map

1979 results map

1980 results map

1982 results map

1983 results map

1984 results map

1986 results map

1987 results map

1988 results map

1990 results map

1991 results map

1992 results map

1994 results map

1995 results map

1996 results map

1998 results map

=== 1999 boundaries ===
1999 results map

2000 results map

2002 results map

2003 results map

2004 results map

2006 results map

2007 results map

2008 results map

2010 results map

2011 results map

2012 results map

2014 results map

2015 results map

=== 2019 boundaries ===
2019 results map

2023 results map

== By-election results ==
=== 1998-2002 ===
Borehamwood Brookmeadow By-Election 7 June 2001
| Party | Candidate | Votes | % | ±% |
|---|---|---|---|---|
| Labour | Leon Reefe | 1,386 | 50.2 | −6.9 |
| Conservative | Dora O'Sullivan | 878 | 31.8 | −11.1 |
| Liberal Democrats | Mary Marsh | 497 | 18.0 | +18.0 |
| Majority | | 508 | 18.4 | |
| Turnout | | 2,761 | 55.1 | |
| Labour hold | | Swing | | |

=== 2002-2006 ===
Borehamwood Cowley Hill By-Election 5 May 2005
| Party | Candidate | Votes | % | ±% |
|---|---|---|---|---|
| Labour | Peter Hedges | 1,519 | 51.3 | +12.5 |
| Conservative | Alan Gellatly | 1,017 | 34.4 | +0.8 |
| Liberal Democrats | Mark Silverman | 423 | 14.3 | +14.3 |
| Majority | | 502 | 16.9 | |
| Turnout | | 2,959 | 56.9 | |
| Labour hold | | Swing | | |

=== 2006-2010 ===
Potters Bar Oakmere By-Election 22 October 2009
| Party | Candidate | Votes | % | ±% |
|---|---|---|---|---|
| Conservative | Tugay Sevincli | 679 | 76.6 | +5.4 |
| Labour | Paul Tengwo | 207 | 23.4 | −5.4 |
| Majority | | 472 | 53.2 | |
| Turnout | | 886 | 17.1 | |
| Conservative hold | | Swing | | |

Bushey Heath By-Election 26 November 2009
| Party | Candidate | Votes | % | ±% |
|---|---|---|---|---|
| Conservative | Paul Morris | 748 | 74.8 | −3.9 |
| Liberal Democrats | Anita Ownsworth | 157 | 15.7 | +6.8 |
| Labour | Charles George | 95 | 9.5 | +1.3 |
| Majority | | 591 | 59.1 | |
| Turnout | | 1,000 | 20.3 | |
| Conservative hold | | Swing | | |

=== 2010-2014 ===
Borehamwood Hillside By-Election 2 May 2013
| Party | Candidate | Votes | % | ±% |
|---|---|---|---|---|
| Conservative | Farida Turner | 703 | 41.8 | −4.6 |
| Labour | Tony Breslin | 518 | 30.8 | −5.4 |
| UKIP | Mark Silverman | 397 | 23.6 | +10.9 |
| Liberal Democrats | Anita Gamble | 62 | 3.7 | −1.1 |
| Majority | | 185 | 11.0 | |
| Turnout | | 1,680 | | |
| Conservative hold | | Swing | | |

=== 2015-2019 ===
Potters Bar Oakmere By-Election 4 May 2017
| Party | Candidate | Votes | % | ±% |
|---|---|---|---|---|
| Conservative | Sarah Hodgson-Jones | 882 | 59.2 | +4.3 |
| Labour | John Doolan | 445 | 29.9 | −1.4 |
| UKIP | Vikki Johnson | 163 | 10.9 | +10.9 |
| Majority | | 437 | 29.3 | |
| Turnout | | 1,490 | | |
| Conservative hold | | Swing | | |

Borehamwood Kenilworth By-Election 5 October 2017
| Party | Candidate | Votes | % | ±% |
|---|---|---|---|---|
| Labour | Jeremy Newmark | 383 | 37.8 | −10.1 |
| Conservative | Pat Strack | 341 | 33.7 | −19.4 |
| Liberal Democrats | Mary Marsh | 144 | 14.2 | +14.2 |
| Independent | Lawrence Strack | 91 | 9.0 | +9.0 |
| UKIP | Vikki Johnson | 54 | 5.3 | +5.3 |
| Majority | | 42 | 4.1 | |
| Turnout | | 1,013 | | |
| Labour gain from Conservative | | Swing | | |

Borehamwood Cowley Hill By-Election 4 January 2018
| Party | Candidate | Votes | % | ±% |
|---|---|---|---|---|
| Labour | Rebecca Butler | 709 | 59.8 | +3.4 |
| Conservative | Sean Moore | 381 | 32.2 | −11.4 |
| UKIP | David Hoy | 57 | 4.8 | +4.8 |
| Liberal Democrats | Paul Robinson | 20 | 1.7 | +1.7 |
| Green | Nicholas Winston | 18 | 1.5 | +1.5 |
| Majority | | 328 | 4.1 | |
| Turnout | | 1,185 | | |
| Labour gain from Conservative | | Swing | | |

=== 2019-2023 ===
Borehamwood Kenilworth By-Election 13 February 2020
| Party | Candidate | Votes | % | ±% |
|---|---|---|---|---|
| Conservative | Brett Rosehill | 776 | 49.0 | +3.6 |
| Labour | Dan Ozarow | 655 | 41.3 | −13.3 |
| Liberal Democrats | Andy Lewis | 104 | 6.6 | +6.6 |
| Green | John Humphries | 50 | 3.2 | +3.2 |
| Majority | | 121 | 7.6 | |
| Turnout | | 1,585 | | |
| Conservative gain from Labour | | Swing | | |

Borehamwood Kenilworth By-Election 6 May 2021
| Party | Candidate | Votes | % | ±% |
|---|---|---|---|---|
| Labour | Dan Ozarow | 1,119 | 53.3 | −1.3 |
| Conservative | David Neifeld | 828 | 39.4 | −6.0 |
| Liberal Democrats | Darren Diamond | 152 | 7.2 | +7.2 |
| Majority | | 291 | 13.9 | |
| Turnout | | 2,099 | | |
| Labour gain from Conservative | | Swing | | |

Bushey North By-Election 6 May 2021
| Party | Candidate | Votes | % | ±% |
|---|---|---|---|---|
| Liberal Democrats | Alan Matthews | 1,136 | 49.2 | +9.2 |
| Conservative | Jane West | 785 | 34.0 | +1.9 |
| Labour | John Barratt | 265 | 11.5 | −5.9 |
| Green | Matt Wheeler | 125 | 5.4 | +5.4 |
| Majority | | 351 | 15.2 | |
| Turnout | | 2,311 | | |
| Liberal Democrats hold | | Swing | | |

=== 2023-2027 ===
Borehamwood Brookmeadow By-Election 24 July 2025
| Party | Candidate | Votes | % | ±% |
|---|---|---|---|---|
| Conservative | Glenn Briski | 478 | 29.6 | −13.5 |
| Reform | Gus Channer | 394 | 24.4 | +24.4 |
| Independent | Michelle Vince | 339 | 21.0 | +21.0 |
| Labour | Bala Mere | 295 | 18.3 | −27.9 |
| Liberal Democrats | Rosalind Levine | 47 | 2.9 | −7.8 |
| Green | Madalyn Bielfeld | 37 | 2.3 | +2.3 |
| Independent | Lawrence Stack | 26 | 1.6 | +1.6 |
| Majority | | 84 | 5.2 | |
| Turnout | | 1,616 | | |
| Conservative hold | | Swing | | |

Bentley Heath and The Royds By-Election 7 May 2026
| Party | Candidate | Votes | % | ±% |
|---|---|---|---|---|
| Conservative | John Graham | 700 | 33.4 | −10.9 |
| Reform | Simon Rhodes | 607 | 29.0 | +29.0 |
| Labour | Lisa Worrell | 491 | 23.4 | −20.9 |
| Green | John Humphries | 205 | 9.8 | −1.6 |
| Liberal Democrats | Theresa Smith | 93 | 4.4 | +4.4 |
| Majority | | 93 | 4.4 | |
| Turnout | | 2,096 | | |
| Conservative hold | | Swing | | |

Bushey Park By-Election 25 June 2026
| Party | Candidate | Votes | % | ±% |
|---|---|---|---|---|
| Conservative | Linda Silver | 947 | 42.9 | +3.3 |
| Liberal Democrats | Annabel Hennessy | 726 | 32.9 | −19.5 |
| Reform | Katie Elman | 422 | 19.1 | +19.1 |
| Green | John Humphries | 61 | 2.8 | +2.8 |
| Labour | Robin Short | 50 | 2.3 | −5.7 |
| Majority | | 221 | 10.0 | |
| Turnout | | 2,206 | | |
| Conservative gain from Liberal Democrats | | Swing | | |
