= 2015 Hertsmere Borough Council election =

UK local government election

- 7 May 2015

All 39 seats to Hertsmere Borough Council 20 seats needed for a majority

	First party	Second party
Party	Conservative	Labour
Seats won	37	2
Seat change	▲3	▼3
Popular vote	42,563	22,151
Percentage	57.3%	29.8%
Swing	▲11.0%	▲6.2%
- Winner of each seat at the 2015 Hertsmere Borough Council election. Wards in white were not contested.
Control before election
Conservative
Control after election
Conservative

The 2015 Hertsmere Borough Council election took place on 7 May 2015 to elect members of Hertsmere Borough Council in Hertfordshire, England. This was on the same day as the 2015 general election and other local elections.

From this election, Hertsmere Borough Council moved from a one-third election cycle to a full council election cycle, with all members being elected every four years (the next election was held in 2019). Because of this, all seats were up for election, although the ward boundaries and total number of seats remained the same.

== Summary ==
=== Election result ===
2015 Hertsmere Borough Council election
Party	Candidates	Seats	Gains	Losses	Net gain/loss	Seats %	Votes %	Votes	+/−
Conservative	39	37	3	0	▲3	94.9	57.3	42,563	+11.0
Labour	38	2	0	3	▼3	5.1	29.8	22,151	+6.2
Liberal Democrats	7	0	0	0	Steady	0.0	5.1	3,773	–0.4
Independent	4	0	0	0	Steady	0.0	4.1	3,063	+2.2
UKIP	4	0	0	0	Steady	0.0	3.6	2,669	–18.5

== Ward results ==
Incumbent councillors standing for re-election are marked with an asterisk (*). Changes in seats do not take into account by-elections or defections.

=== Aldenham East ===
Aldenham East (2 seats)
Party	Candidate	Votes	%
Conservative	John Graham*	2,159	79.4
Conservative	Charles Goldstein*	2,127	78.3
Labour	William Grimsey	320	11.8
Liberal Democrats	Holly Gunning	320	11.8
Labour	Peter Halsey	276	10.2
UKIP	Stuart Pole	234	8.6
Turnout		~2,718	75.2
Conservative hold			
Conservative hold			

=== Aldenham West ===
Aldenham West (2 seats)
Party	Candidate	Votes	%
Conservative	Caroline Clapper*	1,749	76.6
Conservative	David Lambert	1,646	72.2
Labour	Sandra Huff	457	20.0
Labour	Brian Levy	385	16.9
Liberal Democrats	Andrew Simmons	325	14.3
Turnout		~2,281	70.9
Conservative hold			
Conservative hold			

=== Borehamwood Brookmeadow ===
Borehamwood Brookmeadow (3 seats)
Party	Candidate	Votes	%
Conservative	Alan Plancey	1,824	60.2
Conservative	Susan Brown	1,701	56.2
Conservative	Gary Silver	1,607	53.1
Labour	Jeremy Newmark	1,350	44.6
Labour	Sam Lishak	1,334	44.1
Labour	Rebecca Schapira	1,269	41.9
Turnout		~3,028	59.7
Conservative hold			
Conservative gain from Labour			
Conservative hold			

=== Borehamwood Cowley Hill ===
Borehamwood Cowley Hill (3 seats)
Party	Candidate	Votes	%
Labour	Richard Butler*	1,874	62.6
Labour	Michelle Vince*	1,495	50.0
Conservative	David Burcombe	1,449	48.4
Labour	Ann Harrison*	1,426	47.7
Conservative	Clive Butchins	1,375	46.0
Conservative	Alan Gellatly	1,357	45.4
Turnout		~2,992	55.5
Labour hold			
Labour hold			
Conservative gain from Labour			

=== Borehamwood Hillside ===
Borehamwood Hillside (3 seats)
Party	Candidate	Votes	%
Conservative	Charles Kelly	2,262	60.2
Conservative	Farida Turner*	1,913	50.9
Conservative	Meenal Sachdev	1,813	48.2
Labour	Becca Hedges	1,470	39.1
Labour	Peter Hedges	1,462	38.9
Labour	Lee Petar	1,457	38.8
UKIP	David Appleby	903	24.0
Turnout		~3,760	62.2
Conservative hold			
Conservative hold			
Conservative hold			

=== Borehamwood Kenilworth ===
Borehamwood Kenilworth (2 seats)
Party	Candidate	Votes	%
Conservative	Thomas Ash	1,363	55.1
Conservative	Victor Eni	1,290	52.2
Labour	Jon Galliers*	1,206	48.8
Labour	Jennifer Reefe	1,084	43.9
Turnout		~2,472	59.4
Conservative gain from Labour			
Conservative gain from Labour			

=== Bushey Heath ===
Bushey Heath (3 seats)
Party	Candidate	Votes	%
Conservative	Brenda Batten*	3,037	86.1
Conservative	Paul Morris*	3,000	85.1
Conservative	Seamus Quilty*	2,790	79.1
Labour	David Bearfield	682	19.3
Labour	Gladys De Groot	547	15.5
Labour	Fikile Mkoyana	525	14.9
Turnout		~3,527	74.8
Conservative hold			
Conservative hold			
Conservative hold			

=== Bushey North ===
Bushey North (3 seats)
Party	Candidate	Votes	%
Conservative	Lawrence Davis	1,493	49.6
Conservative	Jane West*	1,419	47.1
Conservative	Kashif Merchant	1,123	37.3
Independent	Wayne Thomas	986	32.7
Labour	John Barratt	929	30.8
Independent	Leslie Winters*	908	30.1
Labour	Andrew Head	803	26.7
Labour	Sandy Mercado	794	26.4
Liberal Democrats	Shailain Shah	582	19.3
Turnout		~3,012	65.3
Conservative hold			
Conservative hold			
Conservative hold			

=== Bushey Park ===
Bushey Park (2 seats)
Party	Candidate	Votes	%
Conservative	Linda Silver*	1,789	75.7
Conservative	Anne Swerling*	1,545	65.4
Labour	Joanna Grindrod	521	22.0
Labour	Fred Grindrod	467	19.8
Liberal Democrats	Helen Oakwater	406	17.2
Turnout		~2,364	71.4
Conservative hold			
Conservative hold			

=== Bushey St James ===
Bushey St James (3 seats)
Party	Candidate	Votes	%
Conservative	Carey Keates*	2,284	64.0
Conservative	Pervez Choudhury*	2,271	63.7
Conservative	Peter Rutledge*	2,195	61.5
Labour	Mary Reid	1,170	32.8
Labour	Yue Cheng	1,070	30.0
Labour	James Sowerbutts	982	27.5
UKIP	Lee Greenfield	730	20.5
Turnout		~3,567	70.2
Conservative hold			
Conservative hold			
Conservative hold			

=== Elstree ===
Elstree (2 seats)
Party	Candidate	Votes	%
Conservative	Harvey Cohen*	2,031	82.1
Conservative	Morris Bright*	1,893	76.5
Labour	Anna Coleshill	516	20.9
Labour	Joe Goldberg	507	20.5
Turnout		~2,474	68.5
Conservative hold			
Conservative hold			

=== Potters Bar Furzefield ===
Potters Bar Furzefield (3 seats)
Party	Candidate	Votes	%
Conservative	Peter Knell*	1,798	63.5
Conservative	Cynthia Barker	1,513	53.5
Conservative	Martin Worster*	1,429	50.5
Labour	Lisa Griffin	894	31.6
Labour	Holly Hare	819	28.9
UKIP	David Hoy	802	28.3
Labour	Pat Smith	800	28.3
Liberal Democrats	Susan Oatway	435	15.4
Turnout		~2,830	68.6
Conservative hold			
Conservative hold			
Conservative hold			

=== Potters Bar Oakmere ===
Potters Bar Oakmere (3 seats)
Party	Candidate	Votes	%
Conservative	Christine Lyon*	2,005	67.0
Conservative	Jean Heywood	1,650	55.2
Conservative	Penny Swallow*	1,553	51.9
Labour	Jennifer Bolton	1,144	38.2
Labour	Chris Shellard	1,064	35.6
Labour	John Doolan	1,051	35.1
Independent	Bob Calcutt*	506	16.9
Turnout		~2,991	62.1
Conservative hold			
Conservative hold			
Conservative hold			

=== Potters Bar Parkfield ===
Potters Bar Parkfield (3 seats)
Party	Candidate	Votes	%
Conservative	John Donne*	3,005	77.1
Conservative	Paul Hodgson-Jones*	2,889	74.1
Conservative	Abhishek Sachdev*	2,449	62.8
Labour	Susan Lingam	996	25.5
Labour	Lynda Stoker	843	21.6
Labour	Harvey Ward	822	21.1
Liberal Democrats	Michael Willett	694	17.8
Turnout		~3,899	71.5
Conservative hold			
Conservative hold			
Conservative hold			

=== Shenley ===
Shenley (2 seats)
Party	Candidate	Votes	%
Conservative	Anthony Spencer	1,710	72.5
Conservative	Peter Wayne*	1,404	59.5
Independent	Rosemary Gilligan*	663	28.1
Labour	Ray Edge	578	24.5
Liberal Democrats	Derek Buchanan	362	15.3
Turnout		~2,359	69.4
Conservative hold			
Conservative hold			

== Post-election changes ==
Bushey North by-election: 21 January 2016
Party	Candidate	Votes	%	±%
Conservative	Jane West	881	52.6	+15.2
Liberal Democrats	Shailan Shah	333	19.9	+5.3
Labour	Seamus Williams	286	17.1	−6.2
UKIP	David Hoy	176	10.5	N/A
Majority		548	32.7	N/A
Turnout		1676	36.3	−29.0
Conservative hold		Swing		
