= 2002 Hertsmere Borough Council election =

2002 English local election

- 2 May 2002

15 out of 39 seats to Hertsmere Borough Council 20 seats needed for a majority
- Registered: 63,279
- Turnout: 32.8% (▲2.5%)

	First party	Second party
Party	Conservative	Labour
Seats won	7	4
Seats after	24	9
Seat change	▲2	▼2
Popular vote	10,145	6,425
Percentage	44.8%	28.4%
Swing	▼13.0%	▲0.8%
	Third party	Fourth party
Party	Liberal Democrats	Independent
Seats won	4	0
Seats after	5	1
Seat change	Steady	Steady
Popular vote	4,988	888
Percentage	22.0%	3.9%
Swing	▲8.2	▲3.0%
- Winner of each seat at the 2002 Hertsmere Borough Council election. Seats in white were not contested.
Control before election
Conservative
Control after election
Conservative

The 2002 Hertsmere Borough Council election took place on 2 May 2002 to elect members of Hertsmere Borough Council in Hertfordshire, England. This was on the same day as other local elections.

One third of the council was up for election and the Conservative Party stayed in overall control of the council.

== Summary ==
=== Background ===
Before the election the Conservatives controlled the council with 22 seats, compared to 10 for Labour, 5 Liberal Democrats and 2 independents. Since the 2000 election 2 Labour councillors, husband and wife Martin and Jean Heywood, had left the party and became independents.

13 of the 15 wards had seats contested in 2002, with only Aldenham East and Aldenham West having no election. The Conservative and Labour parties both had 5 seats up for election, while the Liberal Democrats defended 4 and the independents had 1 seat being contested.

=== Election result ===
The Conservatives increased their majority after gaining 2 seats from Labour to have 24 councillors, compared to 9 for Labour, 5 Liberal Democrats and 1 independent. The Conservatives gained Borehamwood Hillside by 74 votes, with the winning candidate, Sandra Parnell, becoming the first Conservative councillor for Borehamwood since 1976. The other Conservative gain came in Shenley, where Rosemary Gilligan took the seat by 154 votes, after the Conservatives had gained the other seat in the ward at the last election in 2000.

Despite losing 2 seats Labour did gain a seat in Borehamwood Cowley Hill by 193 votes defeating independent Jean Heywood. Heywood had left Labour to sit as an independent in 2001 and both she and the Labour candidate Joe Goldberg accused the other of dirty tricks during the campaign. Overall turnout at the election was 32.6%, an increase from 30.6% in 2000.

Following the election the remaining independent councillor, Martin Heywood, joined the Conservatives, taking the Conservatives to a then record 25 seats on the council.

2002 Hertsmere Borough Council election
Party	This election			Full council			This election		
Party	Seats	Net	Seats %	Other	Total	Total %	Votes	Votes %	+/−
Conservative	7	▲2	46.7	15	24	61.5	10,145	44.8	–13.0
Labour	4	▼2	26.7	5	9	23.1	6,425	28.4	+0.8
Liberal Democrats	4	Steady	26.7	1	5	12.8	4,988	22.0	+8.2
Independent	0	Steady	0.0	1	1	0.0	888	3.9	+3.0
Green	0	Steady	0.0	0	0	0.0	108	0.5	N/A
Socialist Labour	0	Steady	0.0	0	0	0.0	95	0.4	N/A

== Ward results ==
Incumbent councillors standing for re-election are marked with an asterisk (*). Changes in seats do not take into account by-elections or defections.

=== Borehamwood Brookmeadow ===
Borehamwood Brookmeadow
Party	Candidate	Votes	%	±%
Labour	Len Silverstone*	736	60.2	+3.1
Conservative	Simon Rubner	487	39.8	–3.1
Majority		249	20.4	+6.2
Turnout		1,223	24.4	+3.8
Registered electors		5,058		
Labour hold		Swing	▲3.8	

=== Borehamwood Cowley Hill ===
Borehamwood Cowley Hill
Party	Candidate	Votes	%	±%
Labour	Joseph Goldberg*	886	52.9	–13.5
Independent	Jean Heywood*	693	41.4	N/A
Socialist Labour	James Dry	95	5.7	N/A
Majority		193	11.5	–21.3
Turnout		1,674	29.8	+10.5
Registered electors		5,716		
Labour hold				

=== Borehamwood Hillside ===
Borehamwood Hillside
Party	Candidate	Votes	%	±%
Conservative	Sandra Parnell	1,054	51.8	+2.1
Labour	Anthony Scott-Norman	980	48.2	–2.1
Majority		74	3.6	N/A
Turnout		2,034	35.3	+2.6
Registered electors		5,806		
Conservative gain from Labour		Swing	▲2.1	

=== Borehamwood Kenilworth ===
Borehamwood Kenilworth (2 seats due to by-election)
Party	Candidate	Votes	%	±%
Labour	Ernest Butler	463	51.2	–14.7
Labour	Francis Ward*	457	50.6	–11.3
Conservative	David Wernick*	231	25.6	–1.3
Conservative	Lucy Wernick	208	23.0	–1.0
Independent	Peter Hedges	195	21.6	N/A
Turnout		~904	22.4	+2.0
Registered electors		4,036		
Labour hold				
Labour hold				

=== Bushey Heath ===
Bushey Heath
Party	Candidate	Votes	%	±%
Conservative	Ron Gealy*	1,110	67.5	–0.1
Liberal Democrats	Patrick Forsyth	361	22.0	+0.1
Labour	Dinah Hoeksma	173	10.5	±0.0
Majority		749	45.5	–0.2
Turnout		1,644	32.0	+3.2
Registered electors		5,163		
Conservative hold		Swing	▼0.1	

=== Bushey North ===
Bushey North (2 seats due to by-election)
Party	Candidate	Votes	%	±%
Liberal Democrats	Marilyn Colne*	1,083	67.9	+13.1
Liberal Democrats	Robert Gamble*	895	56.1	+1.3
Conservative	Trevor Jones	356	22.3	–11.6
Conservative	John Slade*	318	19.9	–14.0
Labour	Sandra Mercado	172	10.8	–0.5
Green	Vega Alvarado	108	6.8	N/A
Turnout		~1,594	34.6	+2.6
Registered electors		4,607		
Liberal Democrats hold				
Liberal Democrats hold				

=== Bushey Park ===
Bushey Park
Party	Candidate	Votes	%	±%
Liberal Democrats	Lynne Hodgson*	651	46.9	+7.6
Conservative	Anne Swerling	628	45.2	–8.7
Labour	James Sowerbutts	110	7.9	+1.1
Majority		23	1.7	N/A
Turnout		1,389	40.7	+0.9
Registered electors		3,426		
Liberal Democrats hold		Swing	▲8.2	

=== Bushey St. James ===
Bushey St. James
Party	Candidate	Votes	%	±%
Liberal Democrats	Zita Hobbs	1,311	59.1	+18.3
Conservative	David Bertin	748	33.7	–14.6
Labour	Christine Sowerbutts	158	7.1	–3.8
Majority		563	25.4	N/A
Turnout		2,217	40.0	+7.2
Registered electors		5,560		
Liberal Democrats hold		Swing	▲16.5	

=== Elstree ===
Elstree
Party	Candidate	Votes	%	±%
Conservative	Derrick Gunasekera*	768	68.6	+5.5
Labour	Oliver De Peyer	223	19.9	–17.0
Liberal Democrats	Roger Kutchinsky	128	11.4	N/A
Majority		545	48.7	N/A
Turnout		1,119	30.6	+0.6
Registered electors		3,646		
Conservative hold		Swing	▲11.3	

=== Potters Bar Furzefield ===
Potters Bar Furzefield
Party	Candidate	Votes	%	±%
Conservative	Christine Calcutt*	859	54.8	–1.8
Labour	James Fisher	415	26.5	–3.9
Liberal Democrats	Colin Dean	293	18.7	–5.4
Majority		444	28.3	+6.9
Turnout		1,567	32.0	–2.3
Registered electors		4,930		
Conservative hold		Swing	▲1.1	

=== Potters Bar Oakmere ===
Potters Bar Oakmere
Party	Candidate	Votes	%	±%
Conservative	Shirley Legate*	1,125	62.1	+1.4
Labour	Ann Harrison	686	37.9	–1.4
Majority		439	24.2	+2.8
Turnout		1,811	32.3	–2.0
Registered electors		5,649		
Conservative hold		Swing	▲1.4	

=== Potters Bar Parkfield ===
Potters Bar Parkfield
Party	Candidate	Votes	%	±%
Conservative	Edwin Roach*	1,516	70.0	–10.3
Labour	Liz Savage	383	17.7	–2.0
Liberal Democrats	Peter Bonner	266	12.3	N/A
Majority		1,133	52.3	–8.3
Turnout		2,165	37.0	+4.2
Registered electors		5,846		
Conservative hold		Swing	▼4.2	

=== Shenley ===
Shenley
Party	Candidate	Votes	%	±%
Conservative	Rosemary Gilligan	737	55.8	–5.8
Labour	William Hogan*	583	44.2	+5.8
Majority		154	11.6	–11.6
Turnout		1,320	34.0	+3.6
Registered electors		3,836		
Conservative gain from Labour		Swing	▼5.8	
