= 1999 Hertsmere Borough Council election =

1999 UK local government election

- 6 May 1999

All 39 seats to Hertsmere Borough Council 20 seats needed for a majority
- Registered: 69,180
- Turnout: 30.5% (▼0.1%)

	First party	Second party	Third party
Party	Conservative	Labour	Liberal Democrats
Seats won	20	13	6
Seat change	▲9	▼9	Steady
Popular vote	27,015	17,634	7,302
Percentage	52.0%	33.9%	14.1%
Swing	▲7.0%	▲1.8%	▼7.3%
- Winner of each seat at the 1999 Hertsmere Borough Council election.
Control before election
Labour
Control after election
Conservative

The 1999 Hertsmere Borough Council election took place on 6 May 1999 to elect members of Hertsmere Borough Council in Hertfordshire, England. This was on the same day as other local elections.

The whole council was up for election with boundary changes since the last election in 1998. The Conservative party gained overall control of the council from the Labour party.

== Summary ==
=== Election result ===
1999 Hertsmere Borough Council election
Party	Candidates	Seats	Gains	Losses	Net gain/loss	Seats %	Votes %	Votes	+/−
Conservative	39	20	N/A	N/A	▲9	51.3	52.0	27,015	+7.0
Labour	33	13	N/A	N/A	▼9	33.3	33.9	17,634	+1.8
Liberal Democrats	12	6	N/A	N/A	Steady	15.4	14.1	7,302	–7.3

== Ward results ==
Incumbent councillors standing for re-election are marked with an asterisk (*). Changes in seats do not take into account by-elections or defections.

=== Aldenham East ===
Aldenham East (2 seats)
Party	Candidate	Votes	%	±%
Conservative	S. Nagler*	1,160	83.9	+10.0
Conservative	J. Graham*	1,138	82.3	+8.4
Labour	B. Levy	222	16.1	–10.2
Labour	S. Huff	219	15.8	–10.4
Turnout		~1,384	38.5	–4.2
Registered electors		3,595		
Conservative hold				
Conservative hold				

=== Aldenham West ===
Aldenham West (2 seats)
Party	Candidate	Votes	%	±%
Conservative	N. Payne	881	61.2	+16.2
Conservative	H. Saunders	875	60.8	+15.7
Labour	R. Kirk	568	39.5	–4.6
Labour	D. Hoeksma	527	36.6	–7.5
Turnout		~1,438	39.4	–4.3
Registered electors		3,650		
Conservative gain from Labour				
Conservative hold				

=== Borehamwood Brookmeadow ===
Borehamwood Brookmeadow (3 seats)
Party	Candidate	Votes	%
Labour	E. Kelly*	715	64.4
Labour	L. Silverstone*	675	60.8
Labour	T. Sandle*	672	60.5
Conservative	A. Bright	343	30.9
Conservative	P. McEvoy	322	29.0
Conservative	L. Wernick	317	28.5
Turnout		~1,111	21.9
Registered electors		5,075	
Labour win (new seat)			
Labour win (new seat)			
Labour win (new seat)			

=== Borehamwood Cowley Hill ===
Borehamwood Cowley Hill (3 seats)
Party	Candidate	Votes	%
Labour	J. Nolan*	924	72.6
Labour	J. Heywood*	873	68.6
Labour	M. Heywood*	858	67.4
Conservative	P. Brew	260	20.4
Conservative	K. Ross	236	18.5
Conservative	D. Kieran	236	18.5
Turnout		~1,273	22.1
Registered electors		5,760	
Labour win (new seat)			
Labour win (new seat)			
Labour win (new seat)			

=== Borehamwood Hillside ===
Borehamwood Hillside (3 seats)
Party	Candidate	Votes	%
Labour	C. Ward	801	48.5
Labour	J. Goldberg*	793	48.0
Labour	L. Ward*	764	46.2
Conservative	D. McKee	740	44.8
Conservative	K. Sheppard	715	43.3
Conservative	S. Rubner	704	42.6
Turnout		~1,652	29.5
Registered electors		5,600	
Labour win (new seat)			
Labour win (new seat)			
Labour win (new seat)			

=== Borehamwood Kenilworth ===
Borehamwood Kenilworth (2 seats)
Party	Candidate	Votes	%
Labour	B. Stanley*	510	65.9
Labour	F. Ward*	479	61.9
Conservative	D. O'Sullivan	208	26.9
Conservative	P. Monnickendam	186	24.0
Turnout		~773	20.4
Registered electors		3,789	
Labour win (new seat)			
Labour win (new seat)			

=== Bushey Heath ===
Bushey Heath (3 seats)
Party	Candidate	Votes	%
Conservative	M. O'Brien	872	64.6
Conservative	R. Gealy*	852	63.1
Conservative	S. Quilty	821	60.8
Liberal Democrats	P. Forsyth	280	20.7
Liberal Democrats	H. Brass	272	20.1
Labour	H. Bearfield	237	17.5
Liberal Democrats	A. McCracken	232	17.2
Turnout		~1,349	26.9
Registered electors		5,016	
Conservative win (new seat)			
Conservative win (new seat)			
Conservative win (new seat)			

=== Bushey North ===
Bushey North (3 seats)
Party	Candidate	Votes	%
Liberal Democrats	M. Colne*	965	66.7
Liberal Democrats	M. Colne*	908	62.8
Liberal Democrats	M. Silverman	764	52.9
Conservative	M. Tomlinson	322	22.3
Conservative	M. Prisk	303	21.0
Conservative	L. Prisk	289	20.0
Labour	I. Murphy	249	17.2
Turnout		~1,448	31.7
Registered electors		4,566	
Liberal Democrats win (new seat)			
Liberal Democrats win (new seat)			
Liberal Democrats win (new seat)			

=== Bushey Park ===
Bushey Park (2 seats)
Party	Candidate	Votes	%
Liberal Democrats	L. Hodgson*	642	52.3
Liberal Democrats	R. Gamble	604	49.2
Conservative	R. Coppel	434	35.3
Conservative	J. Slade	424	34.5
Labour	E. Page	153	12.5
Turnout		~1,227	36.0
Registered electors		3,409	
Liberal Democrats win (new seat)			
Liberal Democrats win (new seat)			

=== Bushey St. James ===
Bushey St. James (3 seats)
Party	Candidate	Votes	%
Conservative	A. Attwood	832	43.4
Liberal Democrats	A. Bonser	818	42.7
Conservative	C. Keates*	797	41.6
Liberal Democrats	C. Shenton	788	41.1
Liberal Democrats	R. Kutchinsky	779	40.6
Conservative	S. Pitfield	764	39.9
Labour	J. Sowerbutts	303	15.8
Turnout		~1,914	36.0
Registered electors		5,318	
Conservative win (new seat)			
Liberal Democrats win (new seat)			
Conservative win (new seat)			

=== Elstree ===
Elstree (2 seats)
Party	Candidate	Votes	%	±%
Conservative	M. Bright	675	62.2	
Conservative	D. Gunasekera	654	60.3	
Labour	J. Whitby	394	36.3	
Labour	E. Doveton	365	33.6	
Turnout		~1,534	30.0	
Registered electors		3,616		
Conservative hold				
Conservative hold				

=== Potters Bar Furzefield ===
Potters Bar Furzefield (3 seats)
Party	Candidate	Votes	%
Conservative	R. Morris*	836	52.5
Conservative	C. Calcutt	800	50.2
Conservative	R. Foy	788	49.4
Labour	P. Hill	560	35.2
Labour	H. Ward	560	35.2
Labour	E. Butler	491	30.9
Liberal Democrats	S. Bishop	250	15.7
Turnout		~1,594	32.0
Registered electors		4,980	
Conservative win (new seat)			
Conservative win (new seat)			
Conservative win (new seat)			

=== Potters Bar Oakmere ===
Potters Bar Oakmere (3 seats)
Party	Candidate	Votes	%
Conservative	R. Calcutt	987	52.8
Conservative	S. Legate	969	51.8
Conservative	S. Fear	943	50.4
Labour	D. Banks	852	45.6
Labour	A. Harrison	786	42.0
Labour	M. Brilliant	782	41.8
Turnout		~1,871	33.4
Registered electors		5,601	
Conservative win (new seat)			
Conservative win (new seat)			
Conservative win (new seat)			

=== Potters Bar Parkfield ===
Potters Bar Parkfield (3 seats)
Party	Candidate	Votes	%
Conservative	C. Dawes	1,447	75.7
Conservative	E. Roach*	1,447	75.7
Conservative	J. Donne*	1,424	74.5
Labour	E. Savage	423	22.1
Labour	J. Fisher	394	20.6
Labour	B. Moir	361	18.9
Turnout		~1,911	33.3
Registered electors		5,738	
Conservative win (new seat)			
Conservative win (new seat)			
Conservative win (new seat)			

=== Shenley ===
Shenley (2 seats)
Party	Candidate	Votes	%	±%
Labour	W. Hogan*	582	54.1	+2.5
Labour	J. Shaw	542	50.4	–1.2
Conservative	B. Lewis	517	48.1	+35.1
Conservative	R. Saunders	497	46.2	+33.3
Turnout		~1,074	31.0	–17.4
Registered electors		3,467		
Labour hold				
Labour win (new seat)				
