= 2027 Hertsmere Borough Council election =

2027 English local government election

- 6 May 2027

All 39 seats to Hertsmere Borough Council 20 seats needed for a majority
Leader	Lynette Sullivan	Jeremy Newmark	Chris Shenton
Party	Conservative	Labour	Liberal Democrats
Leader's seat	Potters Bar Parkfield	Borehamwood Cowley Hill	Bushey St James
Last election	16 seats, 43.1%	14 seats, 32.9%	9 seats, 21.6%
Current seats	15	12	7
Leader	Marc Amron (Note: Leader of Hertsmere First Independents group.)	Caroline Clapper
Party	Independent	Reform
Leader's seat	Bushey Park	Aldenham West
Last election	0 seats, 0.5%	0 seats, 0.2%
Current seats	3	2
Incumbent Leader
Jeremy Newmark
Labour
No overall control (Note: Labour–Liberal Democrats coalition.)

The 2027 Hertsmere Borough Council election will be held on 6 May 2027 to elect members of Hertsmere Borough Council in Hertfordshire, England. This will be on the same day as other local elections held across the United Kingdom.

== Background ==
=== Local government reorganisation ===
Due to proposed structural changes to local government in England, the 2023 election would have been the final election to the council before it was abolished and replaced by South West Hertfordshire Council, a new unitary authority. However, on 7 September 2026, the government announced it was withdrawing plans for the planned restructuring pending review. Following this announcement, local elections due to be held in 2027 under the existing local electoral calendar would proceed.

== Summary ==
=== Election result ===
2027 Hertsmere Borough Council election
Party	Candidates	Seats	Gains	Losses	Net gain/loss	Seats %	Votes %	Votes	+/−
Conservative		15 (Note: Current seats.)							
Labour		12							
Liberal Democrats		7							
Independent		3							
Reform		2							
