= 2006 Hertsmere Borough Council election =

2006 UK local government election

- 4 May 2006

14 out of 39 seats to Hertsmere Borough Council 20 seats needed for a majority
- Registered: 62,455
- Turnout: 38.4% (▲1.4%)

	First party	Second party	Third party
Party	Conservative	Liberal Democrats	Labour
Seats won	11	2	1
Seats after	28	6	5
Seat change	▲3	▼1	▼2
Popular vote	12,320	4,813	4,122
Percentage	57.6%	21.3%	18.1%
Swing	▲3.7%	▼0.9%	▼5.1%
- Winner of each seat at the 2006 Hertsmere Borough Council election. Wards in white were not contested.
Control before election
Conservative
Control after election
Conservative

The 2006 Hertsmere Borough Council election took place on 4 May 2006 to elect members of Hertsmere Borough Council in Hertfordshire, England. This was on the same day as other local elections.

One third of the council was up for election and the Conservative Party stayed in overall control of the council.

== Summary ==
=== Background ===
Before the election the Conservatives controlled the council with 26 seats, compared to 7 for Labour and 6 Liberal Democrats. As well as the normal 13 seats being contested, an extra seat was up for election in Aldenham East after the councillor Nigel Gilmore stepped down. Other councillors standing down included 2 from Labour, Joe Goldberg and Len Silverstone, and Conservatives Ron Gealy and Zita Hobbs. 9 of the 14 seats were being defended by the Conservatives, 3 by Labour and 2 by the Liberal Democrats.

=== Election result ===
The Conservatives increased their majority to 17 after gaining 2 seats from Labour. This reduced Labour to 5 councillors, behind the Liberal Democrats who stayed on 6 after retaining their 2 seats in Bushey. The Conservatives gains came in Borehamwood Brookmeadow, which they took by 103 votes, and Borehamwood Kenilworth, where Labour lost by 12 votes after several recounts. This meant Labour only won 1 seat in Borehamwood Cowley Hill, where they held on by an 86-vote majority.

The Labour group leader Leon Reefe said the reason for the defeats for the party was that "Labour voters are still disenchanted with what's going on nationally", while the Conservative council leader said "obviously national events had a bearing but I still feel that locally we are providing good services".

2006 Hertsmere Borough Council election
Party	This election			Full council			This election		
Party	Seats	Net	Seats %	Other	Total	Total %	Votes	Votes %	+/−
Conservative	11	▲3	78.6	17	28	71.8	12,320	57.6	+3.7
Liberal Democrats	2	▼1	14.3	4	6	15.4	4,813	21.3	–0.9
Labour	1	▼2	7.1	4	5	12.8	4,122	18.1	–5.1
Green	0	Steady	0.0	0	0	0.0	289	1.2	N/A
Veritas	0	Steady	0.0	0	0	0.0	234	1.0	N/A
Socialist	0	Steady	0.0	0	0	0.0	187	0.8	N/A

== Ward results ==
Incumbent councillors standing for re-election are marked with an asterisk (*). Changes in seats do not take into account by-elections or defections.

=== Aldenham East ===
Aldenham East (by-election)
Party	Candidate	Votes	%	±%
Conservative	Charles Goldstein	1,191	80.3	+2.8
Liberal Democrats	David Bird	172	11.6	–0.1
Labour	Peter Halsley	121	8.2	–2.7
Majority		1,019	68.7	+2.9
Turnout		1,484	48.7	+4.7
Registered electors		~3,047		
Conservative hold		Swing	▲1.5	

=== Borehamwood Brookmeadow ===
Borehamwood Brookmeadow
Party	Candidate	Votes	%	±%
Conservative	Harvey Cohen	730	45.9	–1.6
Labour	Ian Freeney	627	39.4	+5.0
Veritas	Elsie Alokwe	234	14.7	N/A
Majority		103	6.5	–6.6
Turnout		1,591	36.5	+3.5
Registered electors		4,653		
Conservative gain from Labour		Swing	▼3.3	

=== Borehamwood Cowley Hill ===
Borehamwood Cowley Hill
Party	Candidate	Votes	%	±%
Labour	Dinah Hoeksma	642	40.9	+2.1
Conservative	Darren Solomons	556	35.4	+1.8
Socialist	James Dry	187	11.9	+1.2
Liberal Democrats	Martin Ownsworth	186	11.8	–5.0
Majority		86	5.5	+0.3
Turnout		1,571	31.1	+0.6
Registered electors		5,422		
Labour hold		Swing	▲0.3	

=== Borehamwood Hillside ===
Borehamwood Hillside
Party	Candidate	Votes	%	±%
Conservative	Sandra Parnell*	1,245	62.7	+14.5
Labour	Jennifer Reefe	741	37.3	–0.1
Majority		504	25.4	+14.6
Turnout		1,986	34.5	–3.6
Registered electors		5,693		
Conservative hold		Swing	▲7.3	

=== Borehamwood Kenilworth ===
Borehamwood Kenilworth
Party	Candidate	Votes	%	±%
Conservative	Patricia Strack	511	43.4	+5.4
Labour	Ernest Butler*	499	42.4	+1.1
Liberal Democrats	Zissis Kakoulakis	167	14.2	–6.5
Majority		12	1.0	+4.3
Turnout		1,177	31.6	+11.0
Registered electors		3,623		
Conservative gain from Labour		Swing	▲2.2	

=== Bushey Heath ===
Bushey Heath
Party	Candidate	Votes	%	±%
Conservative	Brenda Batten	1,518	73.5	+4.7
Liberal Democrats	Roger Kutchinsky	375	18.2	–2.2
Labour	David Bearfield	171	8.3	–2.4
Majority		1,143	55.4	+6.9
Turnout		2,064	41.7	+1.7
Registered electors		4,887		
Conservative hold		Swing	▲3.5	

=== Bushey North ===
Bushey North
Party	Candidate	Votes	%	±%
Liberal Democrats	Marilyn Colne*	941	58.7	+1.9
Conservative	John Slade	437	27.3	–5.4
Labour	George Bath	118	7.4	–3.1
Green	Arjuna Krishna-Das	106	6.6	N/A
Majority		504	31.5	+7.3
Turnout		1,602	42.0	+6.6
Registered electors		4,208		
Liberal Democrats hold		Swing	▲3.7	

=== Bushey Park ===
Bushey Park
Party	Candidate	Votes	%	±%
Liberal Democrats	Lynne Hodgson*	741	51.5	+14.9
Conservative	Abul Choudhury	698	48.5	–7.5
Majority		43	3.0	N/A
Turnout		1,439	48.0	+2.0
Registered electors		3,301		
Liberal Democrats hold		Swing	▲11.2	

=== Bushey St. James ===
Bushey St. James
Party	Candidate	Votes	%	±%
Conservative	Jean Conway	914	43.8	±0.0
Liberal Democrats	Vincent Turner	846	40.5	–5.9
Green	Edward Canfor-Dumas	183	8.8	N/A
Labour	Yue Ting Cheng	146	7.0	–2.8
Majority		68	3.3	N/A
Turnout		2,089	41.1	–1.0
Registered electors		4,995		
Conservative gain from Liberal Democrats		Swing	▲3.0	

=== Elstree ===
Elstree
Party	Candidate	Votes	%	±%
Conservative	Derrick Gunasekera*	932	75.3	+2.9
Liberal Democrats	Mark Silverman	159	12.8	N/A
Labour	Anthony Scott-Norman	147	11.9	–15.7
Majority		773	62.4	+17.5
Turnout		1,238	34.6	+8.5
Registered electors		3,450		
Conservative hold				

=== Potters Bar Furzefield ===
Potters Bar Furzefield
Party	Candidate	Votes	%	±%
Conservative	Christine Calcutt*	1,066	59.3	+1.4
Liberal Democrats	Colin Dean	443	24.6	+0.9
Labour	James Fisher	289	16.1	–2.3
Majority		623	34.6	+0.5
Turnout		1,798	42.4	+4.0
Registered electors		4,661		
Conservative hold		Swing	▲0.3	

=== Potters Bar Oakmere ===
Potters Bar Oakmere
Party	Candidate	Votes	%	±%
Conservative	Shirley Legate*	1,242	66.2	–2.3
Liberal Democrats	James Hurd	320	17.0	N/A
Labour	Russell Ramshaw	315	16.8	–14.7
Majority		922	49.1	+12.0
Turnout		1,877	36.2	+0.5
Registered electors		5,128		
Conservative hold				

=== Potters Bar Parkfield ===
Potters Bar Parkfield
Party	Candidate	Votes	%	±%
Conservative	Edwin Roach*	1,649	70.3	+2.2
Liberal Democrats	Peter Bonner	478	20.4	+2.1
Labour	Perry Ellis	220	9.4	–4.2
Majority		1,171	49.9	±0.0
Turnout		2,347	41.0	+0.8
Registered electors		5,716		
Conservative hold		Swing	0.0	

=== Shenley ===
Shenley
Party	Candidate	Votes	%	±%
Conservative	Rosemary Gilligan*	822	69.3	+4.5
Labour	Richard Kirk	207	17.5	–1.1
Liberal Democrats	Anita Ownsworth	157	13.2	–3.5
Majority		615	51.9	+5.7
Turnout		1,186	31.9	–4.7
Registered electors		3,671		
Conservative hold		Swing	▲2.8	
