= 2010 Hertsmere Borough Council election =

2010 UK local government election

- 6 May 2010

13 out of 39 seats to Hertsmere Borough Council 20 seats needed for a majority
- Registered: 64,600
- Turnout: 66.1% (▲29.5%)

	First party	Second party	Third party
Party	Conservative	Labour	Liberal Democrats
Seats won	12	1	0
Seats after	34	3	2
Seat change	▲3	Steady	▼3
Popular vote	26,422	11,584	4,313
Percentage	60.9%	26.7%	9.9%
Swing	▼2.8%	▲6.0%	▲0.5%
- Winner of each seat at the 2010 Hertsmere Borough Council election. Wards in white were not contested.
Control before election
Conservative
Control after election
Conservative

The 2010 Hertsmere Borough Council election took place on 6 May 2010 to elect members of Hertsmere Borough Council in Hertfordshire, England. This was on the same day as the 2010 general election and other local elections.

One third of the council was up for election and the Conservative Party stayed in overall control of the council.

== Summary ==
=== Election result ===
Overall turnout at the election was 64.6%.

2010 Hertsmere Borough Council election
Party	This election			Full council			This election		
Party	Seats	Net	Seats %	Other	Total	Total %	Votes	Votes %	+/−
Conservative	12	▲3	92.3	22	34	87.2	26,422	60.9	–2.8
Labour	1	Steady	7.7	2	3	7.7	11,584	26.7	+6.0
Liberal Democrats	0	▼3	0.0	2	2	5.1	4,313	9.9	+0.5
BNP	0	Steady	0.0	0	0	0.0	690	1.6	N/A
Independent	0	Steady	0.0	0	0	0.0	393	0.9	+0.3

== Ward results ==
Incumbent councillors standing for re-election are marked with an asterisk (*). Changes in seats do not take into account by-elections or defections.

=== Borehamwood Brookmeadow ===
Borehamwood Brookmeadow
Party	Candidate	Votes	%	±%
Conservative	Harvey Cohen*	1,503	46.0	–2.1
Labour	Jeanette McMullen	863	26.4	–17.4
Liberal Democrats	Judith Sear	509	15.6	N/A
BNP	Freda Green	264	8.1	N/A
Independent	Andrew Godleman	125	3.8	N/A
Majority		640	19.6	+15.3
Turnout		3,276	59.6	+27.2
Registered electors		5,497		
Conservative hold		Swing	▲7.7	

=== Borehamwood Cowley Hill ===
Borehamwood Cowley Hill
Party	Candidate	Votes	%	±%
Labour	Di Hoeksma*	1,373	42.2	+2.4
Conservative	Anne Mitchell	1,189	36.5	–0.8
BNP	Colin Cooper	426	13.1	N/A
Independent	Frank Ward	268	8.2	–0.8
Majority		184	5.7	+3.2
Turnout		3,279	54.1	+27.4
Registered electors		6,064		
Labour hold		Swing	▲1.6	

=== Borehamwood Hillside ===
Borehamwood Hillside
Party	Candidate	Votes	%	±%
Conservative	Sandra Parnell*	2,496	62.5	+4.6
Labour	Lee Petar	1,499	37.5	+7.1
Majority		997	25.0	–2.5
Turnout		4,048	59.1	+30.6
Registered electors		6,851		
Conservative hold		Swing	▼1.3	

=== Borehamwood Kenilworth ===
Borehamwood Kenilworth
Party	Candidate	Votes	%	±%
Conservative	Pat Strack*	1,253	51.3	+8.9
Labour	Richard Butler	1,188	48.7	+10.7
Majority		65	2.7	–1.8
Turnout		2,481	59.9	+31.4
Registered electors		4,143		
Conservative hold		Swing	▼0.9	

=== Bushey Heath ===
Bushey Heath
Party	Candidate	Votes	%	±%
Conservative	Brenda Batten*	2,997	77.1	–1.6
Liberal Democrats	Andrew Brass	466	12.0	+3.1
Labour	George Bath	422	10.9	+2.7
Majority		2,531	65.1	–4.7
Turnout		3,893	74.1	+36.6
Registered electors		5,251		
Conservative hold		Swing	▼2.4	

=== Bushey North ===
Bushey North
Party	Candidate	Votes	%	±%
Conservative	Jane West	1,371	44.4	–4.1
Liberal Democrats	Eddie Sheridan	1,275	41.2	+4.0
Labour	Jim Sowerbutts	445	14.4	+6.2
Majority		96	3.1	–8.1
Turnout		3,113	65.5	+31.4
Registered electors		4,751		
Conservative gain from Liberal Democrats		Swing	▲4.1	

=== Bushey Park ===
Bushey Park
Party	Candidate	Votes	%	±%
Conservative	David Collins	1,439	58.8	–3.5
Liberal Democrats	Anita Ownsworth	686	28.0	–9.7
Labour	David Bearfield	323	13.2	N/A
Majority		753	30.8	+6.2
Turnout		2,505	72.5	+33.5
Registered electors		3,455		
Conservative gain from Liberal Democrats		Swing	▲3.1	

=== Bushey St. James ===
Bushey St. James
Party	Candidate	Votes	%	±%
Conservative	Denise Kieran	1,850	49.5	–0.7
Liberal Democrats	Robert Gamble	1,377	36.9	–0.3
Labour	Yue Ting Cheng	507	13.6	+6.0
Majority		473	12.7	–0.4
Turnout		3,756	68.2	+32.2
Registered electors		5,507		
Conservative gain from Liberal Democrats		Swing	▼0.2	

=== Elstree ===
Elstree
Party	Candidate	Votes	%	±%
Conservative	Derrick Gunasekera*	1,902	77.7	–10.6
Labour	Ian Feeney	545	22.3	+10.6
Majority		1,357	55.5	–21.2
Turnout		2,483	67.5	+35.4
Registered electors		3,677		
Conservative hold		Swing	▼10.6	

=== Potters Bar Furzefield ===
Potters Bar Furzefield
Party	Candidate	Votes	%	±%
Conservative	Martin Worster	2,250	68.0	–9.9
Labour	Jim Fisher	1,061	32.0	+9.9
Majority		1,189	35.9	–19.8
Turnout		3,401	69.1	+34.8
Registered electors		4,921		
Conservative hold		Swing	▼9.9	

=== Potters Bar Oakmere ===
Potters Bar Oakmere
Party	Candidate	Votes	%	±%
Conservative	James Ricks	2,190	65.6	–5.6
Labour	Michael Nkrumah	1,148	34.4	+5.6
Majority		1,042	31.2	–11.2
Turnout		3,425	61.4	+31.3
Registered electors		5,580		
Conservative hold		Swing	▼5.6	

=== Potters Bar Parkfield ===
Potters Bar Parkfield
Party	Candidate	Votes	%	±%
Conservative	Sarah Hodgson-Jones	3,083	76.8	–7.7
Labour	Derek Marcus	931	23.2	+7.7
Majority		2,152	53.6	–15.4
Turnout		4,087	67.8	+29.7
Registered electors		6,029		
Conservative hold		Swing	▼7.7	

=== Shenley ===
Shenley
Party	Candidate	Votes	%	±%
Conservative	Rosemary Gilligan*	1,949	75.0	+0.5
Labour	Sam Clements	650	25.0	–0.5
Majority		1,299	50.0	+1.0
Turnout		2,642	68.2	+30.1
Registered electors		3,874		
Conservative hold		Swing	▲0.5	
