= 2008 Hertsmere Borough Council election =

2008 UK local government election

- 1 May 2008

13 out of 39 seats to Hertsmere Borough Council 20 seats needed for a majority
- Registered: 63,610
- Turnout: 36.6% (▲5.4%)

	First party	Second party	Third party
Party	Conservative	Liberal Democrats	Labour
Seats won	12	0	1
Seats after	31	5	3
Seat change	▲3	▼2	▼1
Popular vote	15,217	2,250	4,934
Percentage	63.7%	9.4%	20.7%
Swing	▲2.9%	▼1.4%	▲0.3%
- Winner of each seat at the 2008 Hertsmere Borough Council election. Wards in white were not contested.
Control before election
Conservative
Control after election
Conservative

The 2008 Hertsmere Borough Council election took place on 1 May 2008 to elect members of Hertsmere Borough Council in Hertfordshire, England. This was on the same day as other local elections.

One third of the council was up for election and the Conservative Party stayed in overall control of the council.

== Summary ==
=== Election result ===
The Conservatives won all 4 seats in Bushey, including defeating the Liberal Democrat group leader Robert Gamble in Bushey North by 182 votes. The Conservatives also took Borehamwood Brookmeadow from Labour, with the Labour group leader Ann Harrison holding Borehamwood Cowley Hill by 40 votes.

Following the election Lynne Hodgson became the new leader of the Liberal Democrat group.

2008 Hertsmere Borough Council election
Party	This election			Full council			This election		
Party	Seats	Net	Seats %	Other	Total	Total %	Votes	Votes %	+/−
Conservative	12	▲3	92.3	19	31	79.5	15,217	63.7	+2.9
Liberal Democrats	0	▼2	0.0	5	5	12.8	2,250	9.4	–1.4
Labour	1	▼1	7.7	2	3	7.7	4,934	20.7	+0.3
Green	0	Steady	0.0	0	0	0.0	1,117	4.7	+0.2
Socialist Labour	0	Steady	0.0	0	0	0.0	224	0.9	–1.5
Independent	0	Steady	0.0	0	0	0.0	144	0.6	–0.5

== Ward results ==
Incumbent councillors standing for re-election are marked with an asterisk (*). Changes in seats do not take into account by-elections or defections.

=== Aldenham East ===
Aldenham East
Party	Candidate	Votes	%	±%
Conservative	John Graham*	1,179	80.6	+5.4
Green	Jeannette McDermott	163	11.1	+2.4
Labour	Raymond Edge	121	8.3	+1.0
Majority		1,016	69.4	+3.0
Turnout		1,463	40.1	+8.9
Registered electors		3,667		
Conservative hold		Swing	▲1.5	

=== Aldenham West ===
Aldenham West
Party	Candidate	Votes	%	±%
Conservative	Simon Patnick	952	74.5	+0.2
Labour	Sandra Huff	168	13.1	+0.9
Green	Caroline Boydell	158	12.4	–1.1
Majority		784	61.3	+0.6
Turnout		1,278	34.7	+3.4
Registered electors		3,708		
Conservative hold		Swing	▼0.4	

=== Borehamwood Brookmeadow ===
Borehamwood Brookmeadow
Party	Candidate	Votes	%	±%
Conservative	Andrew Zucker	839	48.1	+5.3
Labour	Ian Feeney*	764	43.8	+1.9
Green	David Harris	141	8.1	–7.2
Majority		75	4.3	N/A
Turnout		1,744	32.4	+3.2
Registered electors		5,395		
Conservative gain from Labour		Swing	▲1.7	

=== Borehamwood Cowley Hill ===
Borehamwood Cowley Hill
Party	Candidate	Votes	%	±%
Labour	Ann Harrison*	640	39.8	–9.2
Conservative	Farida Turner	600	37.3	+2.1
Socialist Labour	James Dry	224	13.9	–1.9
Independent	Frank Ward	144	9.0	N/A
Majority		40	2.5	–11.2
Turnout		1,608	26.7	+0.9
Registered electors		6,027		
Labour hold		Swing	▼5.7	

=== Borehamwood Hillside ===
Borehamwood Hillside
Party	Candidate	Votes	%	±%
Conservative	Hannah David*	1,091	57.9	–4.5
Labour	Peter Hedges	573	30.4	–7.2
Liberal Democrats	Gavin Whenman	220	11.7	N/A
Majority		518	27.5	+2.7
Turnout		1,884	28.5	+1.9
Registered electors		6,629		
Conservative hold		Swing	▲1.4	

=== Bushey Heath ===
Bushey Heath
Party	Candidate	Votes	%	±%
Conservative	Seamus Quilty*	1,561	78.7	+3.4
Liberal Democrats	Andrew Brass	177	8.9	–5.5
Labour	David Bearfield	162	8.2	–2.1
Green	Karen Ward	83	4.2	N/A
Majority		1,384	69.8	+8.9
Turnout		1,983	37.5	+3.6
Registered electors		5,300		
Conservative hold		Swing	▲4.5	

=== Bushey North ===
Bushey North
Party	Candidate	Votes	%	±%
Conservative	Steve O'Brien	783	48.5	+9.8
Liberal Democrats	Robert Gamble*	601	37.2	–10.5
Labour	Jim Sowerbutts	132	8.2	+1.7
Green	Arjuna Krishna-Das	100	6.2	–0.8
Majority		182	11.3	N/A
Turnout		1,616	34.1	–0.4
Registered electors		4,743		
Conservative gain from Liberal Democrats		Swing	▲10.2	

=== Bushey Park ===
Bushey Park
Party	Candidate	Votes	%	±%
Conservative	Linda Silver	864	62.3	+13.8
Liberal Democrats	Adam Richards-Gray	522	37.7	–13.8
Majority		342	24.7	N/A
Turnout		1,386	39.0	–9.0
Registered electors		3,577		
Conservative hold		Swing	▲13.8	

=== Bushey St. James ===
Bushey St. James
Party	Candidate	Votes	%	±%
Conservative	Pervez Choudhury	984	50.2	+12.5
Liberal Democrats	Kim Elliot	730	37.2	–8.6
Labour	Yue Ting Cheng	150	7.6	+0.2
Green	Edward Canfor-Dumas	97	4.9	–4.2
Majority		254	13.0	N/A
Turnout		1,961	36.0	–1.7
Registered electors		5,473		
Conservative gain from Liberal Democrats		Swing	▲10.6	

=== Potters Bar Furzefield ===
Potters Bar Furzefield
Party	Candidate	Votes	%	±%
Conservative	Peter Knell	1,303	77.9	+13.2
Labour	James Fisher	369	22.1	+6.9
Majority		934	55.9	+11.4
Turnout		1,672	34.3	–10.2
Registered electors		4,914		
Conservative hold		Swing	▲3.2	

=== Potters Bar Oakmere ===
Potters Bar Oakmere
Party	Candidate	Votes	%	±%
Conservative	Martin Heywood*	1,187	71.2	–3.9
Labour	Russell Ramshaw	480	28.8	+3.9
Majority		707	42.4	–7.8
Turnout		1,667	30.1	+0.2
Registered electors		5,616		
Conservative hold		Swing	▼3.9	

=== Potters Bar Parkfield ===
Potters Bar Parkfield
Party	Candidate	Votes	%	±%
Conservative	John Donne*	1,903	84.5	+13.0
Labour	Pierre Tengwo	350	15.5	+5.8
Majority		1,553	68.9	+16.3
Turnout		2,253	38.1	+0.6
Registered electors		6,019		
Conservative hold		Swing	▲3.6	

=== Shenley ===
Shenley
Party	Candidate	Votes	%	±%
Conservative	Peter Wayne	972	74.5	+5.2
Labour	Richard Butler	332	25.5	+8.0
Majority		640	49.1	–2.8
Turnout		1,304	38.1	+6.2
Registered electors		3,456		
Conservative hold		Swing	▼1.4	
