= 1973 Hertsmere District Council election =

1973 English local election

- 10 May 1973

All 55 seats to Hertsmere District Council 28 seats needed for a majority

	First party	Second party	Third party
Party	Conservative	Labour	Liberal
Seats won	26	17	12
Popular vote	44,185	27,073	20,248
Percentage	42.4%	26.0%	19.5%
Control after election
No overall control

The 1973 Hertsmere District Council election took place on 10 May 1973 to elect members of Hertsmere District Council in Hertfordshire, England. This was on the same day as other local elections.

This was the inaugural election to the council following its creation by the Local Government Act 1972.

== Summary ==
=== Election result ===
1973 Hertsmere District Council election
Party	Candidates	Seats	Gains	Losses	Net gain/loss	Seats %	Votes %	Votes	+/−
Conservative	51	26	N/A	N/A	N/A	47.3	42.4	44,185	N/A
Labour	41	17	N/A	N/A	N/A	30.9	26.0	27,073	N/A
Liberal	26	12	N/A	N/A	N/A	21.8	19.5	20,248	N/A
Independent	18	0	N/A	N/A	N/A	0.0	12.1	12,591	N/A

== Ward results ==
=== Mill ===
Mill (3 seats)
Party	Candidate	Votes	%
Liberal	M. Colne	814	44.8
Liberal	P. Gurney	751	41.3
Liberal	C. Mallach	709	39.0
Labour	P. Wyatt	588	32.3
Labour	J. Squires	536	29.5
Labour	J. Ding	534	29.4
Conservative	E. West	417	22.9
Conservative	I. Harding	390	21.5
Conservative	F. Axworthy	376	20.7
Turnout		~1,818	49.7
Registered electors		3,657	
Liberal win (new seat)			
Liberal win (new seat)			
Liberal win (new seat)			

=== No. 2 (Bushey: St. James) ===
No. 2 (Bushey: St. James) (5 seats)
Party	Candidate	Votes	%
Liberal	D. Rebak	1,600	54.2
Liberal	M. Colin	1,521	51.5
Liberal	C. Hawkswell	1,510	51.2
Liberal	H. Hughes	1,424	48.2
Liberal	L. Brass	1,420	48.1
Conservative	J. Carter	1,125	38.1
Conservative	J. Peskin	1,123	38.0
Conservative	R. Ings	1,116	37.8
Conservative	S. Wall	1,074	36.4
Conservative	J. Warrilow	1,061	35.9
Labour	P. Howfield	229	7.8
Labour	W. Pickin	225	7.6
Labour	U. Wadey	215	7.3
Labour	P. Slavin	209	7.1
Labour	M. Pountney	207	7.0
Turnout		~2,952	49.2
Registered electors		6,000	
Liberal win (new seat)			
Liberal win (new seat)			
Liberal win (new seat)			
Liberal win (new seat)			
Liberal win (new seat)			

=== No. 3 (Bushey: Heath) ===
No. 3 (Bushey: Heath) (6 seats)
Party	Candidate	Votes	%
Conservative	H. Franklin	1,384	33.0
Conservative	K. Baker	1,350	32.2
Conservative	G. Farr	1,335	31.8
Conservative	J. Tigue	1,324	31.5
Conservative	L. Jones	1,305	31.1
Liberal	H. Coombes	1,282	30.5
Independent	E. Crampton	1,274	30.3
Independent	G. Wilson	1,272	30.3
Independent	D. Ewington	1,256	29.9
Independent	P. Horner	1,210	28.8
Independent	J. Ramsden	1,209	28.8
Independent	M. Galan	1,198	28.5
Labour	M. Rubin	257	6.1
Labour	M. Mijovic	256	6.1
Labour	B. Lewis	252	6.0
Labour	J. Shepherd	247	5.9
Labour	R. Whitehouse	233	5.5
Labour	P. Sanders	223	5.3
Turnout		~4,198	55.5
Registered electors		7,564	
Conservative win (new seat)			
Conservative win (new seat)			
Conservative win (new seat)			
Conservative win (new seat)			
Conservative win (new seat)			
Liberal win (new seat)			

=== No. 4 (Potters Bar: East) ===
No. 4 (Potters Bar: East) (3 seats)
Party	Candidate	Votes	%
Conservative	E. Sharpe	939	55.8
Conservative	A. Watson	902	53.6
Conservative	C. Silver	899	53.4
Labour	T. Clarke	745	44.3
Labour	M. Bailey	667	39.6
Labour	A. Driver	660	39.2
Turnout		~1,683	39.3
Registered electors		4,282	
Conservative win (new seat)			
Conservative win (new seat)			
Conservative win (new seat)			

=== No. 5 (Potters Bar: North) ===
No. 5 (Potters Bar: North) (3 seats)
Party	Candidate	Votes	%
Conservative	W. Stock	1,027	69.1
Conservative	K. Birch	1,022	68.7
Conservative	C. De Lisle	1,014	68.2
Liberal	R. Stranks	369	24.8
Liberal	G. Pearce	350	23.5
Liberal	G. Thornton	325	21.9
Independent	S. Heath	92	6.2
Turnout		~1,487	39.1
Registered electors		3,802	
Conservative win (new seat)			
Conservative win (new seat)			
Conservative win (new seat)			

=== No. 6 (Potters Bar: South) ===
No. 6 (Potters Bar: South) (3 seats)
Party	Candidate	Votes	%
Conservative	I. Fielding	833	62.6
Conservative	C. Bullen	806	60.6
Conservative	M. Watts	714	53.6
Independent	C. King	497	37.3
Independent	A. Springall	481	36.1
Independent	J. Clyne	399	30.0
Independent	E. English	337	25.3
Turnout		~1,331	33.8
Registered electors		3,939	
Conservative win (new seat)			
Conservative win (new seat)			
Conservative win (new seat)			

=== No. 7 (Potters Bar: Central) ===
No. 7 (Potters Bar: Central) (3 seats)
Party	Candidate	Votes	%
Liberal	J. Hurd	970	59.0
Liberal	A. Nelmes	763	46.4
Liberal	P. Shannon	763	46.4
Independent	A. Brice	675	41.1
Independent	E. Coltman	654	39.8
Independent	R. Jandron	584	35.5
Independent	P. Vaughan	177	10.8
Turnout		~1,644	50.9
Registered electors		3,230	
Liberal win (new seat)			
Liberal win (new seat)			
Liberal win (new seat)			

=== No. 8 (Potters Bar: West) ===
No. 8 (Potters Bar: West) (3 seats)
Party	Candidate	Votes	%
Conservative	J. Griffin	678	37.9
Conservative	V. Law	640	35.8
Conservative	E. Muddle	632	35.3
Liberal	J. Hurd	590	33.0
Independent	J. Marshall	522	29.2
Independent	W. Ramage	452	25.3
Independent	V. Vessey	302	16.9
Turnout		~1,789	49.5
Registered electors		3,615	
Conservative win (new seat)			
Conservative win (new seat)			
Conservative win (new seat)			

=== No. 9 (Elstree: Brookmeadow) ===
No. 9 (Elstree: Brookmeadow) (3 seats)
Party	Candidate	Votes	%
Labour	D. Button	1,103	91.8
Labour	I. Castle	1,093	91.0
Labour	A. Whitby	1,085	90.3
Conservative	B. Doidge	99	8.2
Conservative	M. Lockwood	97	8.1
Conservative	J. Olliff	83	6.9
Turnout		~1,201	33.1
Registered electors		3,627	
Labour win (new seat)			
Labour win (new seat)			
Labour win (new seat)			

=== No. 10 (Elstree: Cowley) ===
No. 10 (Elstree: Cowley) (4 seats)
Party	Candidate	Votes	%
Labour	J. Kentish	986	76.3
Labour	A. Rosier	966	74.7
Labour	J. Nolan	966	74.7
Labour	V. Urquhart	932	72.1
Conservative	G. Ruddock	305	23.6
Conservative	C. Edwards	290	22.4
Conservative	C. Woolf	283	21.9
Conservative	P. Tunstill	267	20.6
Turnout		~1,293	26.4
Registered electors		4,898	
Labour win (new seat)			
Labour win (new seat)			
Labour win (new seat)			
Labour win (new seat)			

=== No. 11 (Elstree: Elstree) ===
No. 11 (Elstree: Elstree) (2 seats)
Party	Candidate	Votes	%
Conservative	C. Watts	528	56.5
Conservative	A. Brooks	493	52.8
Liberal	A. Woolf	405	43.4
Liberal	V. Collins	382	40.9
Turnout		~934	46.9
Registered electors		1,991	
Conservative win (new seat)			
Conservative win (new seat)			

=== No. 12 (Elstree: Furzehill) ===
No. 12 (Elstree: Furzehill) (5 seats)
Party	Candidate	Votes	%
Labour	B. Coe	1,086	42.4
Labour	A. Nash	1,068	41.7
Labour	L. Marks	1,049	40.9
Labour	P. Rose	1,040	40.6
Labour	D. Serota	1,030	40.2
Conservative	E. Fox	934	36.5
Conservative	D. Dover	889	34.7
Conservative	A. Keating	877	34.2
Conservative	F. Thomas	867	33.8
Conservative	D. Stevens	862	33.6
Liberal	D. Burr	540	21.1
Liberal	W. Cole	531	20.7
Liberal	P. Crombie	485	18.9
Liberal	A. Mackay	482	18.8
Liberal	I. Grant	481	18.8
Turnout		~2,563	41.8
Registered electors		6,131	
Labour win (new seat)			
Labour win (new seat)			
Labour win (new seat)			
Labour win (new seat)			
Labour win (new seat)			

=== No. 13 (Elstree: Manor) ===
No. 13 (Elstree: Manor) (4 seats)
Party	Candidate	Votes	%
Labour	A. Armstrong	1,310	76.0
Labour	R. Atkinson	1,258	73.0
Labour	F. Murray	1,251	72.6
Labour	J. Rogers	1,231	71.4
Conservative	A. Mead	415	24.1
Conservative	S. Latter	403	23.4
Conservative	V. Sharpe	397	23.0
Conservative	G. Silver	393	22.8
Turnout		~1,723	31.4
Registered electors		5,488	
Labour win (new seat)			
Labour win (new seat)			
Labour win (new seat)			
Labour win (new seat)			

=== No. 15 (Aldenham) ===
No. 15 (Aldenham) (6 seats)
Party	Candidate	Votes	%
Conservative	F. Jordan	1,961	64.5
Conservative	A. Glass	1,929	63.5
Conservative	F. Watson	1,904	62.7
Conservative	D. Nelson	1,877	61.8
Conservative	C. Page	1,868	61.5
Conservative	A. Payne	1,843	60.6
Liberal	G. Luffman	615	20.2
Liberal	R. Culnane	585	19.3
Liberal	D. Knight	581	19.1
Labour	G. Hawkins	462	15.2
Labour	N. Bush	455	15.0
Labour	J. Cartledge	438	14.4
Labour	R. Ransley	379	12.5
Labour	B. Vincent	372	12.2
Labour	R. Holland	347	11.4
Turnout		~3,039	43.6
Registered electors		6,970	
Conservative win (new seat)			
Conservative win (new seat)			
Conservative win (new seat)			
Conservative win (new seat)			
Conservative win (new seat)			
Conservative win (new seat)			

=== Shenley ===
Shenley (2 seats)
Party	Candidate	Votes	%
Labour	E. Broadley	463	51.6
Conservative	G. Woolf	434	48.4
Labour	K. Murray	420	46.8
Conservative	J. Grierson-Hill	401	44.7
Turnout		~897	53.9
Registered electors		1,664	
Labour win (new seat)			
Conservative win (new seat)			
