= 2014 Hertsmere Borough Council election =

2014 UK local government election

- 22 May 2014

13 out of 39 seats to Hertsmere Borough Council 20 seats needed for a majority

	First party	Second party
Party	Conservative	Labour
Seats won	11	2
Seats after	34	5
Seat change	▼1	▲1
Popular vote	11,024	5,629
Percentage	46.3%	23.6%
Swing	▼11.5%	▼4.2%
- Winner of each seat at the 2014 Hertsmere Borough Council election. Wards in white were uncontested.
Control before election
Conservative
Control after election
Conservative

The 2014 Hertsmere Borough Council election took place on 22 May 2014 to elect members of Hertsmere Borough Council in Hertfordshire, England. This was on the same day as the 2014 European Parliament election and other local elections.

== Summary ==
=== Election result ===
2014 Hertsmere Borough Council election
Party	This election			Full council			This election		
Party	Seats	Net	Seats %	Other	Total	Total %	Votes	Votes %	+/−
Conservative	11	▼1	84.6	23	34	87.2	11,024	46.3	–11.5
Labour	2	▲1	15.4	3	5	12.8	5,629	23.6	–4.2
UKIP	0	Steady	0.0	0	0	0.0	5,256	22.1	+18.2
Liberal Democrats	0	Steady	0.0	0	0	0.0	1,314	5.5	–4.2
Independent	0	Steady	0.0	0	0	0.0	446	1.9	+1.1
Green	0	Steady	0.0	0	0	0.0	163	0.7	N/A

== Ward results ==
Incumbent councillors standing for re-election are marked with an asterisk (*). Changes in seats do not take into account by-elections or defections.

=== Borehamwood Brookmeadow ===
Borehamwood Brookmeadow
Party	Candidate	Votes	%	±%
Conservative	Clive Butchins	822	41.9	–3.6
Labour	Najaf Raza	635	32.4	–17.0
UKIP	Lawrence Stack	505	25.7	N/A
Majority		187	9.5	N/A
Turnout		1,962		
Conservative hold		Swing	▲6.7	

=== Borehamwood Cowley Hill ===
Borehamwood Cowley Hill
Party	Candidate	Votes	%	±%
Labour	Louise Vince	796	41.3	–24.9
UKIP	James Ward	656	34.0	N/A
Conservative	Victor Eni	475	24.6	–9.2
Majority		140	7.3	–25.1
Turnout		1,927		
Labour hold				

=== Borehamwood Hillside ===
Borehamwood Hillside
Party	Candidate	Votes	%	±%
Conservative	Sandra Parnell*	1,060	43.6	–2.8
Labour	Anthony Scott-Norman	767	31.6	–4.6
UKIP	David Appleby	604	24.8	+12.1
Majority		293	12.0	–1.8
Turnout		2,431		
Conservative hold		Swing	▼0.9	

=== Borehamwood Kenilworth ===
Borehamwood Kenilworth
Party	Candidate	Votes	%	±%
Labour	Jon Galliers	595	39.9	–16.9
Conservative	Pat Strack*	485	32.5	–10.7
UKIP	Frank Ward	413	27.7	N/A
Majority		110	7.4	–6.2
Turnout		1,493		
Labour gain from Conservative		Swing	▼3.1	

=== Bushey Heath ===
Bushey Heath
Party	Candidate	Votes	%	±%
Conservative	Brenda Batten*	1,381	70.0	–6.7
Labour	David Bearfield	252	12.8	+0.3
UKIP	Tracey Impey	218	11.1	N/A
Liberal Democrats	Helen Oakwater	121	6.1	–4.8
Majority		1,129	57.2	–7.0
Turnout		1,972		
Conservative hold		Swing	▼3.5	

=== Bushey North ===
Bushey North
Party	Candidate	Votes	%	±%
Conservative	Jane West*	516	28.3	–18.8
Independent	Wayne Thomas	446	24.5	N/A
UKIP	Cathie Ward	358	19.6	N/A
Labour	James Sowerbutts	280	15.4	–5.2
Liberal Democrats	Shailain Shah	224	12.3	–20.0
Majority		70	3.8	–11.0
Turnout		1,824		
Conservative hold				

=== Bushey Park ===
Bushey Park
Party	Candidate	Votes	%	±%
Conservative	Anne Swerling	826	64.8	–1.5
Labour	Joanna Grindrod	260	20.4	+2.3
Liberal Democrats	Audrey McCracken	189	14.8	–0.8
Majority		566	44.4	–3.8
Turnout		1,275		
Conservative hold		Swing	▼1.9	

=== Bushey St James ===
Bushey St James
Party	Candidate	Votes	%	±%
Conservative	Peter Rutledge	956	44.6	–10.9
Labour	Tony Breslin	451	21.0	–10.0
UKIP	Stuart Pole	390	18.2	N/A
Liberal Democrats	Nick Goldstein	185	8.6	–4.9
Green	Edward Canfor-Dumas	163	7.6	N/A
Majority		505	23.6	–0.9
Turnout		2,145		
Conservative hold		Swing	▼0.5	

=== Elstree ===
Elstree
Party	Candidate	Votes	%	±%
Conservative	Harvey Cohen*	940	66.0	–11.6
Labour	Daniel Elton	225	15.8	–6.6
UKIP	Antony Gee	197	13.8	N/A
Liberal Democrats	Holly Gunning	62	4.4	N/A
Majority		715	50.2	–5.0
Turnout		1,424		
Conservative hold		Swing	▼2.5	

=== Potters Bar Furzefield ===
Potters Bar Furzefield
Party	Candidate	Votes	%	±%
Conservative	Martin Worster*	830	44.6	–15.0
UKIP	David Hoy	528	28.4	N/A
Labour	Kaylee Muldoon	367	19.7	–7.0
Liberal Democrats	Susan Oatway	135	7.3	–6.4
Majority		302	16.2	N/A
Turnout		1,860		
Conservative hold				

=== Potters Bar Oakmere ===
Potters Bar Oakmere
Party	Candidate	Votes	%	±%
Conservative	Ruth Lyon	793	43.7	–3.3
UKIP	John Impey	533	29.4	+10.8
Labour	John Doolan	407	22.4	–6.0
Liberal Democrats	Saif al-Saadoon	81	4.5	–1.6
Majority		260	14.3	–4.3
Turnout		1,814		
Conservative hold		Swing	▼7.1	

=== Potters Bar Parkfield ===
Potters Bar Parkfield
Party	Candidate	Votes	%	±%
Conservative	Abhishek Sachdev	1,191	49.7	–9.6
UKIP	Pauline Dyer	594	24.8	+16.2
Labour	Harvey Ward	385	16.1	+0.5
Liberal Democrats	Michael Willett	226	9.4	+0.8
Majority		597	24.9	–18.8
Turnout		2,396		
Conservative hold		Swing	▼12.9	

=== Shenley ===
Shenley
Party	Candidate	Votes	%	±%
Conservative	Rosemary Gilligan*	749	57.2	–8.1
UKIP	Eddie Wymer	260	19.9	N/A
Labour	Colin Stanoiu	209	16.0	–8.3
Liberal Democrats	Derek Buchanan	91	7.0	–3.4
Majority		489	37.3	–3.7
Turnout		1,309		
Conservative hold				
