= 2007 Hertsmere Borough Council election =

2007 UK local government election

- 3 May 2007

15 out of 39 seats to Hertsmere Borough Council 20 seats needed for a majority
- Registered: 63,322
- Turnout: 31.2% (▼7.2%)

	First party	Second party	Third party
Party	Conservative	Liberal Democrats	Labour
Seats won	10	3	2
Seats after	28	7	4
Seat change	Steady	▲1	▼1
Popular vote	11,961	2,128	4,006
Percentage	60.8%	10.8%	20.4%
Swing	▲3.2%	▼10.5%	▲2.3%
- Winner of each seat at the 2007 Hertsmere Borough Council election. Wards in white were not contested.
Control before election
Conservative
Control after election
Conservative

The 2007 Hertsmere Borough Council election took place on 3 May 2007 to elect members of Hertsmere Borough Council in Hertfordshire, England. This was on the same day as other local elections.

One third of the council was up for election and the Conservative Party stayed in overall control of the council.

== Summary ==
=== Background ===
Before the election the Conservatives controlled the council with 28 seats, while the Liberal Democrats were the main opposition with 6 seats. 15 of the 39 seats were being contested at the election.

The election in Borehamwood Kenilworth ward saw the sitting Labour councillor for the previous 24 years, Frank Ward, stand as an independent against Conservative and Labour candidates. This came after Ward was deselected by the local Labour Party, with Ward accusing local Labour party members of a conspiracy and religious discrimination. However this was denied by Labour, with Labour saying he had "failed to meet the required standards to be considered as a Labour Party candidate".

=== Election result ===
The Conservatives maintained their majority on the council, staying on 28 seats after both gaining and losing a seat. The Liberal Democrats gained Bushey St James from the Conservatives to rise to 7 seats, but the Conservatives also gained a seat from Labour in Borehamwood Kenilworth, meaning that Labour was reduced to 4 councillors.

Conservative Penelope Swallow won in Borehamwood Kenilworth with a 49-vote majority over Labour, with independent Frank Ward having taken 216 votes. Ward said he was pleased with the result as he "was only determined that I would split the Labour vote, so to some extent I did win." However the retiring Labour group leader Leon Reefe said they felt "betrayed" by Ward.

2007 Hertsmere Borough Council election
Party	This election			Full council			This election		
Party	Seats	Net	Seats %	Other	Total	Total %	Votes	Votes %	+/−
Conservative	10	Steady	66.7	18	28	71.8	11,961	60.8	+3.2
Liberal Democrats	3	▲1	20.0	4	7	17.9	2,128	10.8	–10.5
Labour	2	▼1	13.3	2	4	10.3	4,006	20.4	+2.3
Green	0	Steady	0.0	0	0	0.0	889	4.5	+3.3
Socialist Labour	0	Steady	0.0	0	0	0.0	468	2.4	N/A
Independent	0	Steady	0.0	0	0	0.0	216	1.1	N/A

== Ward results ==
Incumbent councillors standing for re-election are marked with an asterisk (*). Changes in seats do not take into account by-elections or defections.

=== Aldenham East ===
Aldenham East
Party	Candidate	Votes	%	±%
Conservative	Charles Goldstein*	854	75.2	–5.1
Liberal Democrats	Mark Silverman	100	8.8	–2.8
Green	Jeanette McDermott	99	8.7	N/A
Labour	Richard Kirk	83	7.3	–0.9
Majority		754	66.4	–2.3
Turnout		1,136	31.2	–17.5
Registered electors		3,645		
Conservative hold		Swing	▼1.2	

=== Aldenham West ===
Aldenham West
Party	Candidate	Votes	%	±%
Conservative	Daniel Griffin	834	74.3	+9.1
Green	Caroline Boydell	152	13.5	N/A
Labour	Peter Halsey	137	12.2	–4.7
Majority		682	60.7	+13.4
Turnout		1,123	31.3	–6.7
Registered electors		3,539		
Conservative hold				

=== Borehamwood Brookmeadow ===
Borehamwood Brookmeadow (2 seats due to by-election)
Party	Candidate	Votes	%	±%
Conservative	Darren Solomons	636	42.1	–3.8
Labour	Ian Feeney*	623	41.2	+1.8
Labour	Richard Butler	617	40.8	+1.4
Conservative	Farida Turner	596	39.4	–6.5
Green	David Harris	227	15.0	N/A
Turnout		~1,511	29.2	–7.3
Registered electors		5,175		
Conservative hold				
Labour hold				

=== Borehamwood Cowley Hill ===
Borehamwood Cowley Hill
Party	Candidate	Votes	%	±%
Labour	Ernest Butler	724	49.0	+8.1
Conservative	Alan Gellatly	521	35.2	–0.2
Socialist Labour	James Dry	234	15.8	+3.9
Majority		203	13.7	+8.2
Turnout		1,479	25.8	–5.3
Registered electors		5,862		
Labour hold		Swing	▲4.2	

=== Borehamwood Hillside ===
Borehamwood Hillside
Party	Candidate	Votes	%	±%
Conservative	Jean Heywood*	1,019	62.4	–0.3
Labour	Lee Petar	615	37.6	+0.3
Majority		404	24.7	–0.6
Turnout		1,634	26.6	–7.9
Registered electors		6,248		
Conservative hold		Swing	▼0.3	

=== Borehamwood Kenilworth ===
Borehamwood Kenilworth
Party	Candidate	Votes	%	±%
Conservative	Penelope Swallow	467	42.4	–1.0
Labour	Peter Hedges	418	38.0	–4.4
Independent	Francis Ward*	216	19.6	N/A
Majority		49	4.5	+3.5
Turnout		1,101	28.2	–3.4
Registered electors		3,949		
Conservative gain from Labour		Swing	▲1.7	

=== Bushey Heath ===
Bushey Heath
Party	Candidate	Votes	%	±%
Conservative	Anne Swerling	1,308	75.3	+1.8
Liberal Democrats	Patrick Forsyth	250	14.4	–3.8
Labour	David Bearfield	178	10.3	+2.0
Majority		1,058	60.9	+5.5
Turnout		1,736	33.9	–7.8
Registered electors		5,135		
Conservative hold		Swing	▲2.8	

=== Bushey North ===
Bushey North
Party	Candidate	Votes	%	±%
Liberal Democrats	Roger Kutchinsky	748	47.7	–11.0
Conservative	Stephen O'Brien	607	38.7	+11.4
Green	Arjuna Krishna-Das	110	7.0	+0.4
Labour	Samuel Russell	102	6.5	–0.9
Majority		141	9.0	–22.5
Turnout		1,567	34.5	–7.5
Registered electors		4,551		
Liberal Democrats hold		Swing	▼11.2	

=== Bushey St. James ===
Bushey St. James (2 seats)
Party	Candidate	Votes	%	±%
Liberal Democrats	Anita Gamble*	957	47.6	+7.1
Liberal Democrats	Laura Richards	838	41.7	+1.2
Conservative	Abul Choudhury	789	39.3	–4.5
Conservative	Pervez Choudhury	754	37.5	–6.3
Green	Edward Canfor-Dumas	191	9.5	+0.7
Labour	Yue Ting Cheng	154	7.7	+0.7
Turnout		~2,009	37.7	–3.4
Registered electors		5,328		
Liberal Democrats hold				
Liberal Democrats gain from Conservative				

=== Elstree ===
Elstree
Party	Candidate	Votes	%	±%
Conservative	Morris Bright*	1,029	88.3	+13.0
Labour	Tim Sandle	136	11.7	–0.2
Majority		893	76.7	+14.3
Turnout		1,165	32.1	–2.5
Registered electors		3,665		
Conservative hold		Swing	▲6.6	

=== Potters Bar Furzefield ===
Potters Bar Furzefield
Party	Candidate	Votes	%	±%
Conservative	Ronald Morris*	890	64.7	+5.4
Liberal Democrats	James Hurd	277	20.1	–4.5
Labour	James Fisher	209	15.2	–0.9
Majority		613	44.5	+9.9
Turnout		1,376	28.2	–14.2
Registered electors		4,888		
Conservative hold		Swing	▲5.0	

=== Potters Bar Oakmere ===
Potters Bar Oakmere
Party	Candidate	Votes	%	±%
Conservative	Robert Calcutt*	1,199	75.1	+8.9
Labour	Russell Ramshaw	398	24.9	+8.1
Majority		801	50.2	+1.1
Turnout		1,597	29.9	–6.3
Registered electors		5,406		
Conservative hold		Swing	▲0.4	

=== Potters Bar Parkfield ===
Potters Bar Parkfield
Party	Candidate	Votes	%	±%
Conservative	Paul Hodgson-Jones	1,579	71.5	+1.2
Liberal Democrats	Peter Bonner	416	18.8	–1.6
Labour	Derek Marcus	214	9.7	+0.3
Majority		1,163	52.6	+2.8
Turnout		2,209	37.5	–3.5
Registered electors		5,931		
Conservative hold		Swing	▲1.4	
