= 1976 Hertsmere District Council election =

Local election in England

- 6 May 1976

All 39 seats to Hertsmere District Council 20 seats needed for a majority
- Registered: 64,887
- Turnout: 48.8%

	First party	Second party	Third party
Party	Conservative	Labour	Liberal
Seats won	25	10	4
Seat change	▼1	▼7	▼8
Popular vote	33,895	15,681	11,479
Percentage	55.5%	25.7%	18.8%
Swing	▲13.1%	▼0.3%	▼0.7%
- Winner of each seat at the 1976 Hertsmere Borough Council election.
Control before election
No overall control
Control after election
Conservative

The 1976 Hertsmere District Council election took place on 6 May 1976 to elect members of Hertsmere District Council in Hertfordshire, England. This was on the same day as other local elections.

== Summary ==
=== Election result ===
1976 Hertsmere District Council election
Party	Candidates	Seats	Gains	Losses	Net gain/loss	Seats %	Votes %	Votes	+/−
Conservative	39	25	N/A	N/A	▼1	64.1	55.5	33,895	+13.1
Labour	38	10	N/A	N/A	▼7	25.6	25.7	15,681	–0.3
Liberal	25	4	N/A	N/A	▼8	10.3	18.8	11,479	–0.7

== Ward results ==
Incumbent councillors standing for re-election are marked with an asterisk (*). Changes in seats do not take into account by-elections or defections.

=== Aldenham East ===
Aldenham East (2 seats)
Party	Candidate	Votes	%
Conservative	Jordan	1,572	90.8
Conservative	D. Nelson	1,551	89.6
Labour	Vincent	162	9.4
Labour	Hawkins	152	8.8
Turnout		~1,736	54.2
Registered electors		3,202	
Conservative win (new seat)			
Conservative win (new seat)			

=== Aldenham West ===
Aldenham West (2 seats)
Party	Candidate	Votes	%
Conservative	Watson	1,239	76.7
Conservative	Payne	1,225	75.8
Labour	Hawkins	376	23.3
Labour	Holland	335	20.7
Turnout		~1,615	47.4
Registered electors		3,408	
Conservative win (new seat)			
Conservative win (new seat)			

=== Brookmeadow ===
Brookmeadow (2 seats)
Party	Candidate	Votes	%
Labour	D. Button	843	77.9
Labour	A. Whitby	813	75.1
Conservative	H. Watson	240	22.2
Conservative	Lockwood	239	22.1
Turnout		~1,082	38.5
Registered electors		2,810	
Labour win (new seat)			
Labour win (new seat)			

=== Campions ===
Campions
Party	Candidate	Votes	%
Labour	J. Nolan	812	82.5
Conservative	Bouma	173	17.6
Majority		639	64.9
Turnout		985	54.3
Registered electors		1,815	
Labour win (new seat)			

=== Cowley ===
Cowley (2 seats)
Party	Candidate	Votes	%
Labour	Kentish	769	68.1
Labour	A. Rosier	742	65.8
Conservative	Doidge	360	31.9
Conservative	Olliff	357	31.6
Turnout		~1,128	31.8
Registered electors		3,546	
Labour win (new seat)			
Labour win (new seat)			

=== Elstree ===
Elstree (2 seats)
Party	Candidate	Votes	%
Conservative	Thomas	1,283	63.7
Conservative	C. Watts	1,282	63.7
Liberal	Style	462	22.9
Liberal	Mackay	417	20.7
Labour	Brooke	269	13.4
Labour	Freedland	268	13.3
Turnout		~2,014	53.6
Registered electors		3,757	
Conservative win (new seat)			
Conservative win (new seat)			

=== Heath North ===
Heath North (2 seats)
Party	Candidate	Votes	%
Conservative	Franklin	894	59.6
Conservative	J. Harding	872	58.1
Liberal	Hyman	447	29.8
Liberal	Mallack	439	29.3
Labour	Peters	161	10.7
Labour	Saunders	142	9.5
Turnout		~1,500	45.1
Registered electors		3,327	
Conservative win (new seat)			
Conservative win (new seat)			

=== Heath South ===
Heath South (2 seats)
Party	Candidate	Votes	%
Conservative	Tighe	1,106	70.8
Conservative	Jones	1,104	70.7
Liberal	Coombes	329	21.1
Liberal	Smith	312	20.0
Labour	Finn	125	8.0
Labour	Slowin	107	6.9
Turnout		~1,562	42.4
Registered electors		3,683	
Conservative win (new seat)			
Conservative win (new seat)			

=== Hillside ===
Hillside (2 seats)
Party	Candidate	Votes	%
Labour	Murray	646	52.8
Labour	Marks	633	51.8
Conservative	Lewis	491	40.1
Conservative	Stevens	474	38.8
Liberal	Rutland	87	7.1
Turnout		~1,223	41.8
Registered electors		2,927	
Labour win (new seat)			
Labour win (new seat)			

=== Kenilworth ===
Kenilworth (2 seats)
Party	Candidate	Votes	%
Labour	Armstrong	898	55.9
Labour	Atkinson	808	50.3
Conservative	Upton	612	38.1
Conservative	Wells	521	32.4
Liberal	Shelley	95	5.9
Turnout		~1,606	47.0
Registered electors		3,416	
Labour win (new seat)			
Labour win (new seat)			

=== Lyndhurst ===
Lyndhurst (2 seats)
Party	Candidate	Votes	%
Conservative	Keating	815	47.8
Conservative	Hine	783	45.9
Labour	Coe	770	45.2
Labour	Cartledge	730	42.8
Liberal	Weller	120	7.0
Turnout		~1,705	49.5
Registered electors		3,447	
Conservative win (new seat)			
Conservative win (new seat)			

=== Mill ===
Mill (2 seats)
Party	Candidate	Votes	%
Liberal	M. Colne	864	47.8
Liberal	P. Gurney	787	43.6
Conservative	Gibson	582	32.2
Conservative	Wadington	507	28.0
Labour	Dring	362	20.0
Labour	J. Squires	358	19.8
Turnout		~1,809	51.7
Registered electors		3,499	
Liberal win (new seat)			
Liberal win (new seat)			

=== Potters Bar Central ===
Potters Bar Central (2 seats)
Party	Candidate	Votes	%
Liberal	J. Hurd	921	48.1
Conservative	I. Fielding	797	41.6
Liberal	Nelmes	743	38.8
Conservative	P. Spratt	695	36.3
Labour	Glatter	198	10.3
Labour	Murray	172	9.0
Turnout		~1,917	61.9
Registered electors		3,097	
Liberal win (new seat)			
Conservative win (new seat)			

=== Potters Bar East ===
Potters Bar East (3 seats)
Party	Candidate	Votes	%
Conservative	James	1,358	60.8
Conservative	George	1,342	60.1
Conservative	John	1,333	59.7
Labour	Driver	548	24.5
Labour	Burness	474	21.2
Labour	Glatter	468	20.9
Liberal	Clarkson	328	14.7
Liberal	Clarkson	283	12.6
Turnout		~2,236	45.7
Registered electors		4,891	
Conservative win (new seat)			
Conservative win (new seat)			
Conservative win (new seat)			

=== Potters Bar North ===
Potters Bar North (2 seats)
Party	Candidate	Votes	%
Conservative	Birch	1,339	73.7
Conservative	W. Stock	1,307	72.0
Liberal	Stranks	345	19.0
Liberal	Thornton	311	17.1
Labour	Spinks	132	7.3
Turnout		~1,815	48.9
Registered electors		3,711	
Conservative win (new seat)			
Conservative win (new seat)			

=== Potters Bar South ===
Potters Bar South (2 seats)
Party	Candidate	Votes	%
Conservative	Bullen	894	60.2
Conservative	Watts	868	58.4
Labour	Clark	384	25.9
Labour	Bailey	369	24.9
Liberal	Bentall	206	13.9
Liberal	Byworth	178	12.0
Turnout		~1,485	47.4
Registered electors		3,132	
Conservative win (new seat)			
Conservative win (new seat)			

=== Potters Bar West ===
Potters Bar West (2 seats)
Party	Candidate	Votes	%
Conservative	Griffin	1,030	56.7
Conservative	E. Muddle	987	54.4
Liberal	J. Hurd	503	27.7
Liberal	Shannon	382	21.0
Labour	Davies	284	15.6
Labour	J. McCarthy	268	14.7
Turnout		~1,816	54.5
Registered electors		3,332	
Conservative win (new seat)			
Conservative win (new seat)			

=== Shenley ===
Shenley
Party	Candidate	Votes	%
Labour	E. Broadley	555	54.6
Conservative	Wild	462	45.4
Majority		93	9.2
Turnout		1,017	60.9
Registered electors		1,670	
Labour win (new seat)			

=== St. James East ===
St. James East (2 seats)
Party	Candidate	Votes	%
Liberal	Hughes	691	45.6
Conservative	Scott	666	43.9
Liberal	Hawkswell	664	43.8
Conservative	Willden	636	41.9
Labour	Hanfield	159	10.5
Labour	Pinner	138	9.1
Turnout		~1,517	55.2
Registered electors		2,747	
Liberal win (new seat)			
Conservative win (new seat)			

=== St. James West ===
St. James West (2 seats)
Party	Candidate	Votes	%
Conservative	Davey	953	49.7
Conservative	L. Silver	946	49.3
Liberal	L. Brass	824	43.0
Liberal	Eustace	741	38.7
Labour	Wyatt	139	7.3
Labour	Pountney	112	5.9
Turnout		~1,916	55.2
Registered electors		3,470	
Conservative win (new seat)			
Conservative win (new seat)			
