= 2012 Hertsmere Borough Council election =

2012 UK local government election

- 3 May 2012

14 out of 39 seats to Hertsmere Borough Council 20 seats needed for a majority
- Registered: 65,469
- Turnout: 30.0% (▼9.9%)

| | First party | Second party |
|---|---|---|
| Party | Conservative | Labour |
| Seats won | 12 | 2 |
| Seats after | 34 | 5 |
| Seat change | ▼1 | ▲1 |
| Popular vote | 12,068 | 5,806 |
| Percentage | 57.8% | 27.8 |
| Swing | ▼1.9% | ▼1.3% |
- Winner of each seat at the 2012 Hertsmere Borough Council election. Wards in white were not contested.
Control before election
Conservative
Control after election
Conservative

The 2012 Hertsmere Borough Council election took place on 3 May 2012 to elect members of Hertsmere Borough Council in Hertfordshire, England. This was on the same day as other local elections.

== Summary ==
=== Election result ===
2012 Hertsmere Borough Council election
| Party | This election | | | Full council | | | This election | | |
| Party | Seats | Net | Seats % | Other | Total | Total % | Votes | Votes % | +/− |
|---|---|---|---|---|---|---|---|---|---|
| Conservative | 12 | ▼1 | 85.7 | 22 | 34 | 87.2 | 12,068 | 57.8 | –1.9 |
| Labour | 2 | ▲1 | 14.3 | 3 | 5 | 12.8 | 5,806 | 27.8 | –1.3 |
| Liberal Democrats | 0 | Steady | 0.0 | 0 | 0 | 0.0 | 2,022 | 9.7 | –0.7 |
| UKIP | 0 | Steady | 0.0 | 0 | 0 | 0.0 | 813 | 3.9 | +3.0 |
| Independent | 0 | Steady | 0.0 | 0 | 0 | 0.0 | 160 | 0.8 | N/A |

== Ward results ==
Incumbent councillors standing for re-election are marked with an asterisk (*). Changes in seats do not take into account by-elections or defections.

=== Aldenham East ===
Aldenham East
| Party | Candidate | Votes | % | ±% |
|---|---|---|---|---|
| Conservative | John Graham* | 1,002 | 75.2 | ±0.0 |
| Labour | Richard Kirk | 147 | 11.0 | –0.4 |
| UKIP | Will Ferry | 97 | 7.3 | N/A |
| Liberal Democrats | Robert Gamble | 87 | 6.5 | –6.8 |
| Majority | | 855 | 64.2 | +2.3 |
| Turnout | | 1,333 | 36.1 | –15.3 |
| Registered electors | | 3,703 | | |
| Conservative hold | | Swing | ▲0.2 | |

=== Aldenham West ===
Aldenham West
| Party | Candidate | Votes | % | ±% |
|---|---|---|---|---|
| Conservative | Caroline Clapper | 770 | 73.5 | +1.1 |
| Labour | Sandra Huff | 178 | 17.0 | –0.4 |
| Liberal Democrats | Holly Gunning | 100 | 9.5 | –0.7 |
| Majority | | 592 | 56.5 | +1.5 |
| Turnout | | 1,048 | 29.3 | –14.9 |
| Registered electors | | 3,605 | | |
| Conservative hold | | Swing | ▲0.8 | |

=== Borehamwood Brookmeadow ===
Borehamwood Brookmeadow
| Party | Candidate | Votes | % | ±% |
|---|---|---|---|---|
| Labour | Susan Maughan | 804 | 49.4 | +6.1 |
| Conservative | Clive Butchins | 741 | 45.5 | –4.6 |
| Liberal Democrats | Nick Goldstein | 82 | 5.0 | –1.7 |
| Majority | | 63 | 3.9 | N/A |
| Turnout | | 1,627 | 30.4 | –6.5 |
| Registered electors | | 5,400 | | |
| Labour gain from Conservative | | Swing | ▲5.4 | |

=== Borehamwood Cowley Hill ===
Borehamwood Cowley Hill
| Party | Candidate | Votes | % | ±% |
|---|---|---|---|---|
| Labour | Ann Harrison* | 904 | 66.2 | +5.3 |
| Conservative | Gill Fowler | 461 | 33.8 | –5.3 |
| Majority | | 443 | 32.4 | +10.6 |
| Turnout | | 1,365 | 22.7 | –8.0 |
| Registered electors | | 6,061 | | |
| Labour hold | | Swing | ▲5.3 | |

=== Borehamwood Hillside ===
Borehamwood Hillside
| Party | Candidate | Votes | % | ±% |
|---|---|---|---|---|
| Conservative | Hannah David* | 915 | 46.4 | –11.8 |
| Labour | Ruth Gotlieb | 714 | 36.2 | –5.6 |
| UKIP | David Appleby | 250 | 12.7 | N/A |
| Liberal Democrats | Anita Gamble | 94 | 4.8 | N/A |
| Majority | | 201 | 10.2 | –6.2 |
| Turnout | | 1,973 | 29.7 | –4.2 |
| Registered electors | | 6,673 | | |
| Conservative hold | | Swing | ▼3.1 | |

=== Bushey Heath ===
Bushey Heath
| Party | Candidate | Votes | % | ±% |
|---|---|---|---|---|
| Conservative | Seamus Quilty* | 1,379 | 76.7 | +1.4 |
| Labour | Najaf Raza | 224 | 12.5 | –0.6 |
| Liberal Democrats | Roger Kutchinsky | 196 | 10.9 | –0.6 |
| Majority | | 1,155 | 64.2 | +2.0 |
| Turnout | | 1,799 | 34.5 | –13.6 |
| Registered electors | | 5,261 | | |
| Conservative hold | | Swing | ▲1.0 | |

=== Bushey North ===
Bushey North
| Party | Candidate | Votes | % | ±% |
|---|---|---|---|---|
| Conservative | Steve O'Brien* | 671 | 47.1 | +1.7 |
| Liberal Democrats | Shailain Shah | 461 | 32.3 | +0.8 |
| Labour | Jim Sowerbutts | 294 | 20.6 | –2.5 |
| Majority | | 210 | 14.8 | +0.9 |
| Turnout | | 1,426 | 29.2 | –10.1 |
| Registered electors | | 4,930 | | |
| Conservative hold | | Swing | ▲0.5 | |

=== Bushey Park ===
Bushey Park
| Party | Candidate | Votes | % | ±% |
|---|---|---|---|---|
| Conservative | Linda Silver* | 734 | 66.3 | +4.0 |
| Labour | David Bearfield | 200 | 18.1 | N/A |
| Liberal Democrats | Audrey McCracken | 173 | 15.6 | –22.1 |
| Majority | | 534 | 48.2 | +23.5 |
| Turnout | | 1,107 | 31.7 | –7.3 |
| Registered electors | | 3,523 | | |
| Conservative hold | | | | |

=== Bushey St. James ===
Bushey St. James
| Party | Candidate | Votes | % | ±% |
|---|---|---|---|---|
| Conservative | Pervez Choudhury* | 1,008 | 55.5 | +3.7 |
| Labour | Tony Breslin | 562 | 31.0 | +3.3 |
| Liberal Democrats | Morries Ziman | 245 | 13.5 | –7.0 |
| Majority | | 446 | 24.5 | +0.4 |
| Turnout | | 1,815 | 32.1 | –12.5 |
| Registered electors | | 5,720 | | |
| Conservative hold | | Swing | ▲0.2 | |

=== Potters Bar Furzefield ===
Potters Bar Furzefield (2 seats due to by-election)
| Party | Candidate | Votes | % | ±% |
|---|---|---|---|---|
| Conservative | Brian Legate | 881 | 59.2 | –2.2 |
| Conservative | Peter Knell* | 871 | 58.5 | –2.9 |
| Labour | Jim Fisher | 394 | 26.5 | +1.0 |
| Labour | Derek Marcus | 366 | 24.6 | –0.9 |
| Liberal Democrats | Susan Oatway | 203 | 13.6 | +0.4 |
| Turnout | | ~1,488 | 29.3 | –14.1 |
| Registered electors | | 5,078 | | |
| Conservative hold | | | | |
| Conservative hold | | | | |

=== Potters Bar Oakmere ===
Potters Bar Oakmere
| Party | Candidate | Votes | % | ±% |
|---|---|---|---|---|
| Conservative | Penny Swallow | 736 | 47.0 | –7.1 |
| Labour | John Doolan | 444 | 28.4 | +0.4 |
| UKIP | David Rutter | 291 | 18.6 | +6.9 |
| Liberal Democrats | Michael Willett | 95 | 6.1 | –0.1 |
| Majority | | 292 | 18.6 | –7.5 |
| Turnout | | 1,566 | 28.1 | –8.9 |
| Registered electors | | 5,593 | | |
| Conservative hold | | Swing | ▼3.8 | |

=== Potters Bar Parkfield ===
Potters Bar Parkfield
| Party | Candidate | Votes | % | ±% |
|---|---|---|---|---|
| Conservative | John Donne* | 1,203 | 59.3 | –9.6 |
| Labour | Harvey Ward | 316 | 15.6 | –1.1 |
| Liberal Democrats | Peter Bonner | 175 | 8.6 | –5.9 |
| UKIP | Simon Rhodes | 175 | 8.6 | N/A |
| Independent | Sheldon Kosky | 160 | 7.9 | N/A |
| Majority | | 887 | 43.7 | –8.5 |
| Turnout | | 2,029 | 33.3 | –12.7 |
| Registered electors | | 6,076 | | |
| Conservative hold | | Swing | ▼4.3 | |

=== Shenley ===
Shenley
| Party | Candidate | Votes | % | ±% |
|---|---|---|---|---|
| Conservative | Peter Wayne* | 696 | 65.3 | –9.2 |
| Labour | Ray Edge | 259 | 24.3 | –1.2 |
| Liberal Democrats | Derek Buchanan | 111 | 10.4 | N/A |
| Majority | | 437 | 41.0 | –8.0 |
| Turnout | | 1,066 | 28.0 | –18.0 |
| Registered electors | | 3,846 | | |
| Conservative hold | | Swing | ▼4.0 | |
