= 1998 Hertsmere Borough Council election =

1998 UK local government election

- 7 May 1998

13 out of 39 seats to Hertsmere Borough Council 20 seats needed for a majority
- Registered: 45,018
- Turnout: 30.6% (▼6.4%)

	First party	Second party
Party	Labour	Conservative
Seats won	4	7
Seats after	22	11
Seat change	Steady	▲3
Popular vote	4,420	6,192
Percentage	32.1%	45.0%
Swing	▼9.5%	▲4.7%
	Third party	Fourth party
Party	Liberal Democrats	Independent
Seats won	2	0
Seats after	6	0
Seat change	▼2	▼1
Popular vote	2,949	208
Percentage	21.4%	1.5%
Swing	▲4.9%	▼0.1%
- Winner of each seat at the 1998 Hertsmere Borough Council election. Wards in white were not contested.
Control before election
Labour
Control after election
Labour

The 1998 Hertsmere Borough Council election took place on 7 May 1998 to elect members of Hertsmere Borough Council in Hertfordshire, England. This was on the same day as other local elections.

One third of the council was up for election and the Labour party stayed in overall control of the council.

== Summary ==
=== Election result ===
1998 Hertsmere Borough Council election
Party	This election			Full council			This election		
Party	Seats	Net	Seats %	Other	Total	Total %	Votes	Votes %	+/−
Labour	4	Steady	30.8	18	22	56.4	4,420	32.1	–9.5
Conservative	7	▲3	53.8	4	11	28.2	6,192	45.0	+4.7
Liberal Democrats	2	▼2	15.4	4	6	15.4	2,949	21.4	+4.9
Independent	0	▼1	0.0	0	0	0.0	208	1.5	–0.1

== Ward results ==
Incumbent councillors standing for re-election are marked with an asterisk (*). Changes in seats do not take into account by-elections or defections.

=== Aldenham East ===
Aldenham East
Party	Candidate	Votes	%	±%
Conservative	J. Graham	1,140	79.6	+5.8
Labour	S. Huff	292	20.4	–5.8
Majority		848	59.2	+11.6
Turnout		1,432	39.9	–2.8
Registered electors		3,603		
Conservative hold		Swing	▲5.8	

=== Brookmeadow ===
Brookmeadow
Party	Candidate	Votes	%	±%
Labour	B. Moir*	478	78.1	–6.8
Conservative	P. Brew	134	21.9	+6.8
Majority		344	56.2	–13.6
Turnout		612	22.2	–14.6
Registered electors		2,768		
Labour hold		Swing	▼6.8	

=== Elstree ===
Elstree
Party	Candidate	Votes	%	±%
Conservative	D. Wernick*	1,024	64.4	+19.9
Labour	S. Parkins	566	35.6	–19.9
Majority		458	28.8	N/A
Turnout		1,590	30.5	–5.2
Registered electors		5,219		
Conservative hold		Swing	▲19.9	

=== Heath North ===
Heath North
Party	Candidate	Votes	%	±%
Conservative	J. Slade	638	45.6	+12.5
Liberal Democrats	M. Silverman*	603	43.1	–10.7
Labour	D. Bearfield	158	11.3	–1.8
Majority		35	2.5	N/A
Turnout		1,399	35.1	–4.4
Registered electors		3,996		
Conservative gain from Liberal Democrats		Swing	▲11.6	

=== Heath South ===
Heath South
Party	Candidate	Votes	%	±%
Conservative	R. Gealy*	820	67.4	+7.5
Labour	H. Bearfield	214	17.6	–4.8
Liberal Democrats	R. Kutchinsky	183	15.0	–2.8
Majority		606	49.8	+12.2
Turnout		1,217	30.2	–3.7
Registered electors		4,027		
Conservative hold		Swing	▲6.1	

=== Kenilworth ===
Kenilworth
Party	Candidate	Votes	%	±%
Labour	B. Stanley*	599	74.2	–9.3
Independent	P. Strack	208	25.8	N/A
Majority		391	48.4	–18.6
Turnout		807	28.9	–4.6
Registered electors		2,818		
Labour hold				

=== Mill ===
Mill
Party	Candidate	Votes	%	±%
Liberal Democrats	M. Colne*	784	66.7	–6.7
Conservative	M. Tomlinson	262	22.3	+11.2
Labour	S. Mercado	129	11.0	–4.5
Majority		522	44.4	–13.5
Turnout		1,175	35.1	–12.5
Registered electors		3,436		
Liberal Democrats hold		Swing	▼9.0	

=== Potters Bar Central ===
Potters Bar Central
Party	Candidate	Votes	%	±%
Conservative	R. Morris*	569	49.1	+1.2
Labour	A. King	460	39.7	–12.4
Liberal Democrats	C. Dean	130	11.2	N/A
Majority		109	9.4	N/A
Turnout		1,159	34.4	–1.9
Registered electors		3,362		
Conservative hold		Swing	▲6.8	

=== Potters Bar East ===
Potters Bar East
Party	Candidate	Votes	%	±%
Labour	D. Banks*	820	50.8	–2.6
Conservative	S. Fear	795	49.2	+2.6
Majority		25	1.6	–5.2
Turnout		1,615	36.7	–2.3
Registered electors		4,432		
Labour hold		Swing	▼2.6	

=== Potters Bar North ===
Potters Bar North
Party	Candidate	Votes	%	±%
Conservative	E. Roach*	931	70.6	+3.6
Labour	H. Ward	250	19.0	–14.0
Liberal Democrats	S. Bishop	137	10.4	N/A
Majority		681	51.6	+17.6
Turnout		1,318	37.0	+1.2
Registered electors		3,485		
Conservative gain from Independent		Swing	▲8.8	

=== Potters Bar South ===
Potters Bar South
Party	Candidate	Votes	%	±%
Labour	P. Hill	476	52.0	+9.4
Conservative	C. Calcutt	440	48.0	+13.7
Majority		36	3.9	–4.3
Turnout		916	35.0	–11.1
Registered electors		2,617		
Labour hold		Swing	▼2.2	

=== St. James East ===
St. James East
Party	Candidate	Votes	%	±%
Liberal Democrats	E. Gadsden*	620	61.3	+3.5
Conservative	D. Kieran	228	22.6	–3.8
Labour	J. Sowerbutts	163	16.1	+0.3
Majority		392	38.7	+7.3
Turnout		1,011	33.5	–8.3
Registered electors		3,018		
Liberal Democrats hold		Swing	▲3.7	

=== St. James West ===
St. James West
Party	Candidate	Votes	%	±%
Conservative	C. Keates	520	42.4	+2.0
Liberal Democrats	R. Bates*	492	40.1	–2.7
Labour	G. De Groot	214	17.5	+0.7
Majority		28	2.3	N/A
Turnout		1,226	33.8	–9.1
Registered electors		3,639		
Conservative gain from Liberal Democrats		Swing	▲2.4	
