= 2019 Hertsmere Borough Council election =

2019 English local election

- 2 May 2019

All 39 seats to Hertsmere Borough Council 20 seats needed for a majority
- Registered: 76,763
- Turnout: 32.8%

	First party	Second party	Third party
Party	Conservative	Labour	Liberal Democrats
Seats won	29	7	3
Seat change	▼8	▲5	▲3
Popular vote	30,298	15,779	6,487
Percentage	54.2%	28.3%	11.6%
Swing	▼3.1%	▼1.5%	▲6.5%
- Winner of each seat at the 2019 Hertsmere Borough Council election.
Control before election
Conservative
Control after election
Conservative

The 2019 Hertsmere Borough Council election took place on 2 May 2019 to elect members of Hertsmere Borough Council in Hertfordshire, England. This was on the same day as other local elections.

== Summary ==
=== Election result ===
2019 Hertsmere Borough Council election
Party	Candidates	Seats	Gains	Losses	Net gain/loss	Seats %	Votes %	Votes	+/−
Conservative	39	29	0	7	▼8	74.4	54.2	30,298	–3.1
Labour	39	7	4	0	▲5	17.9	28.3	15,779	–1.5
Liberal Democrats	18	3	3	0	▲3	7.7	11.6	6,487	+6.5
Independent	7	0	0	0	Steady	0.0	4.3	2,381	+0.2
UKIP	4	0	0	0	Steady	0.0	1.6	897	–2.0

== Ward results ==
Incumbent councillors standing for re-election are marked with an asterisk (*). Changes in seats do not take into account by-elections or defections.

=== Aldenham East ===
Aldenham East (2 seats)
Party	Candidate	Votes	%	±%
Conservative	Lucy Selby	1,097	70.1	–9.2
Conservative	John Graham*	1,058	67.6	–10.6
Independent	Sue Dickson	251	16.0	N/A
Liberal Democrats	Saif al-Saadoon	204	13.1	+1.3
Labour	David Harris	160	10.2	–1.6
Labour	Sandra Huff	143	9.1	–1.1
Turnout		~1,563	40.3	–34.9
Registered electors		3,878		
Conservative hold				
Conservative hold				

=== Aldenham West ===
Aldenham West (2 seats)
Party	Candidate	Votes	%	±%
Conservative	Caroline Clapper*	1,001	76.9	+0.3
Conservative	David Lambert*	845	64.9	–7.3
Liberal Democrats	Paul Watson	197	15.1	+0.8
Labour	Richard Kirk	175	13.4	–6.6
Labour	John Maizels	160	12.3	–4.6
Turnout		~1,302	33.2	–37.7
Registered electors		3,921		
Conservative hold				
Conservative hold				

=== Bentley Heath & The Royds ===
Bentley Heath & The Royds (2 seats)
Party	Candidate	Votes	%
Conservative	Mike Reeve	833	61.8
Conservative	Sarah Hodgson-Jones*	826	61.3
Labour	Harvey Ward	408	30.3
Labour	Austin Harney	368	27.3
Turnout		~1,346	30.2
Registered electors		4,458	
Conservative win (new seat)			
Conservative win (new seat)			

=== Borehamwood Brookmeadow ===
Borehamwood Brookmeadow (3 seats)
Party	Candidate	Votes	%	±%
Conservative	Susan Brown*	830	40.8	–19.3
Conservative	Alan Plancey*	827	40.7	–15.5
Conservative	Glenn Briski	731	36.0	–17.1
Labour	Graeme Alexander	711	35.0	–9.6
Labour	Alpha Collins	681	33.5	–10.6
Labour	Prabhakar Kaza	641	31.5	–10.3
Independent	Gary Silver*	433	21.3	N/A
Independent	Eric Silver	417	20.5	N/A
Independent	Katie Hunter	301	14.8	N/A
Turnout		~2,031	33.1	–26.6
Registered electors		6,136		
Conservative hold				
Conservative hold				
Conservative hold				

=== Borehamwood Cowley Hill ===
Borehamwood Cowley Hill (3 seats)
Party	Candidate	Votes	%	±%
Labour	Richard Butler*	879	55.9	–6.6
Labour	Michelle Vince*	866	55.0	+5.1
Labour	Jeremy Newmark*	733	46.6	–1.0
Conservative	Clive Butchins	417	26.5	–21.9
Conservative	Rodney Burt	408	25.9	–20.0
Conservative	Andy Grady	390	24.8	–20.6
UKIP	Lee Greenfield	272	17.3	N/A
Turnout		~1,571	26.4	–29.1
Registered electors		5,952		
Labour hold				
Labour hold				
Labour gain from Conservative				

=== Borehamwood Hillside ===
Borehamwood Hillside (3 seats)
Party	Candidate	Votes	%	±%
Conservative	Farida Turner*	700	39.8	–20.3
Conservative	Victor Eni*	698	39.7	–11.2
Conservative	Meenal Sachdev*	659	37.5	–10.7
Labour	Rachel Shaw	404	23.0	–16.1
Labour	Mik Levin	391	22.3	–16.6
Labour	Henry Okonu	390	22.2	–16.6
Liberal Democrats	Andy Lewis	315	17.9	N/A
Independent	Joe Hunter	284	16.2	N/A
Liberal Democrats	Sophie Aldridge	262	14.9	N/A
Liberal Democrats	Elaine Elliman	248	14.1	N/A
UKIP	David Appleby	224	12.7	–11.2
Turnout		~1,756	32.1	–30.1
Registered electors		5,472		
Conservative hold				
Conservative hold				
Conservative hold				

=== Borehamwood Kenilworth ===
Borehamwood Kenilworth (3 seats)
Party	Candidate	Votes	%	±%
Labour	Rebecca Butler*	987	54.6	+5.8
Conservative	Cynthia Barker*	822	45.5	–9.6
Labour	Kumail Jaffer	819	45.3	+1.4
Labour	Dan Ozarow	819	45.3	N/A
Conservative	Samantha Evans	738	40.8	–11.4
Conservative	Przemek de Skuba	724	40.1	N/A
Turnout		~1,807	28.2	–31.2
Registered electors		6,409		
Labour gain from Conservative				
Conservative hold				
Labour win (new seat)				

=== Bushey Heath ===
Bushey Heath (2 seats)
Party	Candidate	Votes	%	±%
Conservative	Paul Morris*	881	72.5	–13.6
Conservative	Seamus Quilty*	870	71.6	–13.5
Liberal Democrats	Roger Kutchinsky	183	15.1	N/A
Liberal Democrats	Andrew Brass	170	14.0	N/A
Labour	David Bearfield	109	9.0	–10.3
Labour	Abdul Jabarkhail	80	6.6	–8.9
Turnout		~1,215	33.1	–41.7
Registered electors		3,672		
Conservative hold				
Conservative hold				

=== Bushey North ===
Bushey North (3 seats)
Party	Candidate	Votes	%	±%
Liberal Democrats	Jerry Evans	744	42.1	+22.9
Liberal Democrats	Andrew Melville	743	42.0	N/A
Liberal Democrats	Paul Richards	682	38.6	N/A
Conservative	Lawrence Davis*	597	33.8	–15.8
Conservative	Jane West*	590	33.4	–13.7
Conservative	Kashif Merchant*	477	27.0	–10.3
Labour	John Barratt	324	18.3	–12.4
Labour	Sandy Mercado	271	15.3	–11.3
Labour	Fikile Mkoyana	264	14.9	–11.4
UKIP	Vikki Johnson	196	11.1	N/A
Turnout		~1,764	30.5	–34.8
Registered electors		5,783		
Liberal Democrats gain from Conservative				
Liberal Democrats gain from Conservative				
Liberal Democrats gain from Conservative				

=== Bushey Park ===
Bushey Park (3 seats)
Party	Candidate	Votes	%	±%
Conservative	Linda Silver*	1,241	63.2	–12.4
Conservative	David Carter	1,232	62.7	–2.6
Conservative	Anne Swerling*	1,153	58.7	N/A
Liberal Democrats	Anne Diamond	327	16.7	–0.5
Labour	Nik Oakley	309	15.7	–6.2
Liberal Democrats	Brian Silverman	296	15.1	N/A
Liberal Democrats	Judith Melinek	290	14.8	N/A
Labour	Di Hoeksma	286	14.6	–5.2
Labour	Matthew McHale	245	12.5	N/A
Turnout		~1,961	35.0	–36.4
Registered electors		5,604		
Conservative hold				
Conservative hold				
Conservative win (new seat)				

=== Bushey St James ===
Bushey St James (3 seats)
Party	Candidate	Votes	%	±%
Conservative	Peter Rutledge*	790	56.4	–7.6
Conservative	Pervez Choudhury*	779	55.7	–8.0
Conservative	Harry Mortimer	762	54.4	–7.1
Liberal Democrats	Holly Gunning	363	25.9	N/A
Labour	Yue Cheng	313	22.4	–10.4
Liberal Democrats	Christopher Scobie	312	22.3	N/A
Liberal Democrats	Hannah Uri	307	21.9	N/A
Labour	David McGregor	291	20.8	–9.2
Labour	Mary Reid	282	20.1	–7.4
Turnout		~2,111	39.4	–30.8
Registered electors		5,357		
Conservative hold				
Conservative hold				
Conservative hold				

=== Elstree ===
Elstree (2 seats)
Party	Candidate	Votes	%	±%
Conservative	Harvey Cohen*	956	70.2	–11.9
Conservative	Morris Bright*	927	68.1	–8.4
Labour	Caroline Pitrakou	202	14.8	–6.1
Labour	Elsa Reyes Maguina	194	14.2	–6.3
Independent	Stella Hunter	172	12.6	N/A
Turnout		~1,362	35.5	–33.0
Registered electors		3,835		
Conservative hold				
Conservative hold				

=== Potters Bar Furzefield ===
Potters Bar Furzefield (2 seats)
Party	Candidate	Votes	%	±%
Labour	Christian Gray	611	44.7	+13.1
Labour	Chris Myers	583	42.7	+13.7
Conservative	Peter Knell*	543	39.8	–23.8
Conservative	Martin Worster*	508	37.2	–16.4
UKIP	David Hoy	205	15.0	–13.3
Turnout		~1,368	32.2	–36.4
Registered electors		4,249		
Labour gain from Conservative				
Labour gain from Conservative				

=== Potters Bar Oakmere ===
Potters Bar Oakmere (2 seats)
Party	Candidate	Votes	%	±%
Conservative	Jean Heywood*	665	55.6	–11.4
Conservative	Christine Lyon*	645	53.9	–1.3
Labour	John Doolan	459	38.4	+0.1
Labour	Ann Harrison	450	37.6	+2.0
Turnout		~1,197	28.0	–34.1
Registered electors		4,276		
Conservative hold				
Conservative hold				

=== Potters Bar Parkfield ===
Potters Bar Parkfield (2 seats)
Party	Candidate	Votes	%	±%
Conservative	Paul Hodgson-Jones*	754	53.6	–23.5
Conservative	Abhishek Sachdev*	683	48.5	–25.6
Liberal Democrats	Jonathan Brett	447	31.8	+14.0
Liberal Democrats	Sachin Saggar	397	28.2	N/A
Labour	Lynda Stoker	190	13.5	–12.0
Labour	Chris Shellard	168	11.9	–9.7
Turnout		~1,407	36.7	–34.8
Registered electors		3,832		
Conservative hold				
Conservative hold				

=== Shenley ===
Shenley (2 seats)
Party	Candidate	Votes	%	±%
Conservative	Natalie Susman	776	55.2	–17.3
Conservative	Anthony Spencer*	765	54.4	–5.1
Independent	Rosemary Gilligan	523	37.2	+9.1
Labour	Ray Edge	238	16.9	–7.6
Labour	Helen Yenilmez	175	12.4	N/A
Turnout		~1,407	35.8	–33.6
Registered electors		3,929		
Conservative hold				
Conservative hold				

== By-elections ==
=== Borehamwood Kenilworth (February 2020) ===
Borehamwood Kenilworth: 13 February 2020
Party	Candidate	Votes	%	±%
Conservative	Brett Rosehill	776	49.0	+8.6
Labour	Dan Ozarow	655	41.3	−3.6
Liberal Democrats	Andy Lewis	104	6.6	N/A
Green	John Humphries	50	3.2	N/A
Majority		121	13.9	
Turnout		1,585		
Conservative gain from Labour		Swing		

=== Borehamwood Kenilworth (May 2021) ===
Borehamwood Kenilworth: 6 May 2021
Party	Candidate	Votes	%	±%
Labour	Dan Ozarow	1,119	53.3	+12.0
Conservative	David Neifeld	828	39.4	−9.6
Liberal Democrats	Darren Diamond	152	7.2	+0.6
Majority		291	13.9	
Turnout		2,099		
Labour gain from Conservative		Swing		

=== Bushey North ===
Bushey North: 6 May 2021
Party	Candidate	Votes	%	±%
Liberal Democrats	Alan Matthews	1,136	49.2	+6.7
Conservative	Jane West	785	34.0	+0.3
Labour	John Barratt	265	11.5	−7.0
Green	Matt Wheeler	125	5.4	N/A
Majority		351	15.2	
Turnout		2,311		
Liberal Democrats hold		Swing		
