= 2000 Hertsmere Borough Council election =

2000 UK local government election

- 4 May 2000

13 out of 39 seats to Hertsmere Borough Council 20 seats needed for a majority
- Registered: 61,740
- Turnout: 30.3% (▼0.2%)

	First party	Second party	Third party
Party	Conservative	Labour	Liberal Democrats
Seats won	9	3	1
Seats after	22	12	5
Seat change	▲2	▼1	▼1
Popular vote	10,807	5,161	2,577
Percentage	57.8%	27.6%	13.8%
Swing	▲5.8%	▼6.3%	▼0.3%
- Winner of each seat at the 2000 Hertsmere Borough Council election. Wards in white were not contested.
Control before election
Conservative
Control after election
Conservative

The 2000 Hertsmere Borough Council election took place on 4 May 2000 to elect members of Hertsmere Borough Council in Hertfordshire, England. This was on the same day as other local elections.

One third of the council was up for election and the Conservative Party stayed in overall control of the council.

== Summary ==
=== Election result ===
Overall turnout at the election as 30.6%.

2000 Hertsmere Borough Council election
Party	This election			Full council			This election		
Party	Seats	Net	Seats %	Other	Total	Total %	Votes	Votes %	+/−
Conservative	9	▲2	69.2	13	22	56.4	10,807	57.8	+5.8
Labour	3	▼1	23.1	9	12	30.8	5,161	27.6	–6.3
Liberal Democrats	1	▼1	7.7	4	5	12.8	2,577	13.8	–0.3
Independent	0	Steady	0	0	0	0.0	165	0.9	N/A

== Ward results ==
Incumbent councillors standing for re-election are marked with an asterisk (*). Changes in seats do not take into account by-elections or defections.

=== Aldenham East ===
Aldenham East
Party	Candidate	Votes	%	±%
Conservative	J. Graham*	1,031	86.4	+2.5
Labour	S. Huff	162	13.6	–2.5
Majority		869	72.8	N/A
Turnout		1,193	33.3	–5.2
Registered electors		3,579		
Conservative hold		Swing	▲2.5	

=== Aldenham West ===
Aldenham West
Party	Candidate	Votes	%	±%
Conservative	H. Saunders	821	76.6	+15.8
Labour	R. Kirk	251	23.4	–15.8
Majority		570	53.2	N/A
Turnout		1,072	31.8	–7.6
Registered electors		3,375		
Conservative hold		Swing	▲15.8	

=== Borehamwood Brookmeadow ===
Borehamwood Brookmeadow
Party	Candidate	Votes	%	±%
Labour	T. Sandle*	590	57.1	–10.5
Conservative	S. Rubner	444	42.9	+10.5
Majority		146	14.2	N/A
Turnout		1,034	20.6	–1.3
Registered electors		5,014		
Labour hold		Swing	▼10.5	

=== Borehamwood Cowley Hill ===
Borehamwood Cowley Hill
Party	Candidate	Votes	%	±%
Labour	M. Heywood*	738	66.4	–11.6
Conservative	K. Ross	374	33.6	+11.6
Majority		364	32.8	N/A
Turnout		1,112	19.3	–2.8
Registered electors		5,749		
Labour hold		Swing	▼11.6	

=== Borehamwood Hillside ===
Borehamwood Hillside
Party	Candidate	Votes	%	±%
Labour	L. Ward*	920	50.3	–1.7
Conservative	D. McKee	908	49.7	+1.7
Majority		12	0.6	N/A
Turnout		1,828	32.7	+3.2
Registered electors		5,587		
Labour hold		Swing	▼1.7	

=== Bushey Heath ===
Bushey Heath
Party	Candidate	Votes	%	±%
Conservative	S. Quilty	989	67.6	+4.8
Liberal Democrats	P. Forsyth	320	21.9	+1.7
Labour	D. Bearfield	153	10.5	–6.6
Majority		669	45.7	N/A
Turnout		1,462	28.8	+1.9
Registered electors		5,076		
Conservative hold		Swing	▲1.6	

=== Bushey North ===
Bushey North
Party	Candidate	Votes	%	±%
Liberal Democrats	M. Silverman*	807	54.8	–8.0
Conservative	D. Bertin	499	33.9	+12.9
Labour	I. Murphy	167	11.3	–4.9
Majority		308	20.9	N/A
Turnout		1,473	32.0	+0.3
Registered electors		4,599		
Liberal Democrats hold		Swing	▼10.5	

=== Bushey Park ===
Bushey Park
Party	Candidate	Votes	%	±%
Conservative	S. Pitfield	726	53.9	+18.6
Liberal Democrats	R. Gamble*	530	39.3	–12.9
Labour	D. Heoksma	91	6.8	–5.6
Majority		196	14.6	N/A
Turnout		1,347	39.8	+3.8
Registered electors		3,384		
Conservative gain from Liberal Democrats		Swing	▲15.8	

=== Bushey St. James ===
Bushey St. James
Party	Candidate	Votes	%	±%
Conservative	C. Keates*	856	48.3	+5.7
Liberal Democrats	M. Spector	723	40.8	–1.1
Labour	M. Reid	194	10.9	–4.6
Majority		133	7.5	N/A
Turnout		1,773	32.8	–3.2
Registered electors		5,404		
Conservative hold		Swing	▲3.4	

=== Potters Bar Furzefield ===
Potters Bar Furzefield
Party	Candidate	Votes	%	±%
Conservative	R. Foy*	786	53.0	+2.2
Labour	E. Savage	336	22.6	–11.4
Liberal Democrats	C. Dean	197	13.3	–1.9
Independent	C. Morgan-Gray	165	11.1	N/A
Majority		450	30.4	N/A
Turnout		1,484	30.2	–1.8
Registered electors		4,907		
Conservative hold		Swing	▲6.8	

=== Potters Bar Oakmere ===
Potters Bar Oakmere
Party	Candidate	Votes	%	±%
Conservative	S. Fear	1,159	60.7	+7.0
Labour	A. Harrison	750	39.3	–7.0
Majority		409	21.4	+14.0
Turnout		1,909	34.3	–0.9
Registered electors		5,570		
Conservative hold		Swing	▲7.0	

=== Potters Bar Parkfield ===
Potters Bar Parkfield
Party	Candidate	Votes	%	±%
Conservative	J. Donne*	1,511	80.3	+2.9
Labour	J. Fisher	371	19.7	–2.9
Majority		1,140	60.6	N/A
Turnout		1,882	32.8	–0.5
Registered electors		5,744		
Conservative hold		Swing	▲2.9	

=== Shenley ===
Shenley
Party	Candidate	Votes	%	±%
Conservative	R. Saunders	703	61.6	+14.6
Labour	J. Shaw*	438	38.4	–14.6
Majority		265	23.2	N/A
Turnout		1,141	30.4	–0.6
Registered electors		3,752		
Conservative gain from Labour		Swing	▲14.6	
