= Hertsmere =

Non-metropolitan district and borough in England

Coordinates: 51.66°N 0.27°W

Borough of Hertsmere
- Non-metropolitan district & Borough
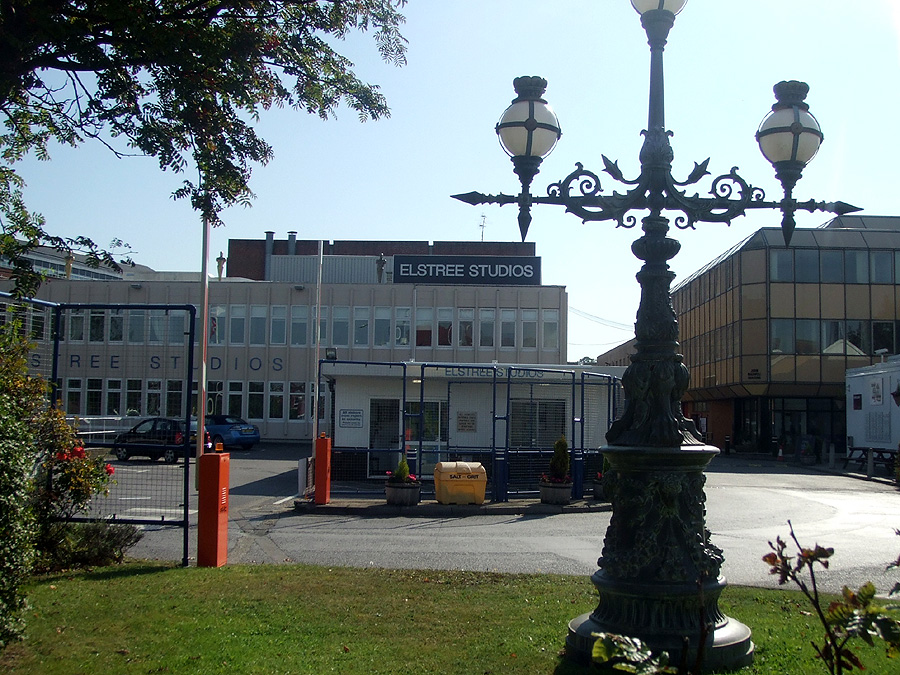
- Elstree Studios in Borehamwood

- Coat of arms

- Hertsmere shown within Hertfordshire
- Sovereign state: United Kingdom
- Constituent country: England
- Region: East of England
- Non-metropolitan county: Hertfordshire
- Status: Non-metropolitan district, Borough
- Admin HQ: Borehamwood
- Incorporated: 1 April 1974

Government
  - Type: Non-metropolitan district council
  - Body: Hertsmere Borough Council
  - Leadership: Leader & Cabinet (No overall control)
  - MPs: Oliver Dowden(C); Matt Turmaine (L)

Area
  - Total: 39.06 sq mi (101.16 km^{2})
  - Rank: 196th (of 296)

Population (2025)
  - Total: 110,242
  - Rank: 226th (of 296)
  - Density: 2,822.5/sq mi (1,089.8/km^{2})

Ethnicity (2021)
  - Ethnic groups: List: 77.1% White; 10.5% Asian; 4.8% Black; 3.8% other; 3.7% Mixed

Religion (2021)
  - Religion: List: 41.8% Christianity; 24.2% no religion; 17,0% Judaism; 13.2% other; 3.8% Islam
- Time zone: UTC0 (GMT)
  - Summer (DST): UTC+1 (BST)
- ONS code: 26UE (ONS); E07000098 (GSS)
- OS grid reference: TQ195975

Hertsmere is a local government district with borough status in Hertfordshire, England. Its council is based in Borehamwood. Other settlements in the borough include Bushey, Elstree, Radlett and Potters Bar. The borough contains several film studios, including Elstree Studios and the BBC Elstree Centre at Borehamwood. The borough borders Three Rivers, Watford, St Albans, and Welwyn Hatfield in Hertfordshire and the three north London boroughs of Harrow, Barnet and Enfield. Hertsmere is located mainly within the M25 Motorway.

== History ==
Hertsmere was created on 1 April 1974 under the Local Government Act 1972, covering the whole area of three former districts and a single parish from a fourth district, which were all abolished at the same time:

- Aldenham parish from Watford Rural District
- Bushey Urban District
- Elstree Rural District
- Potters Bar Urban District

The Potters Bar Urban District (which coincided with the parish of South Mimms) was historically part of Middlesex, but had been transferred to Hertfordshire on 1 April 1965 when Greater London was created and Middlesex County Council abolished.

The name "Hertsmere" was coined for the new district by combining the common abbreviation of Hertfordshire ("Herts") with "mere", an archaic word for a boundary, referencing the area's location on Hertfordshire's border with Greater London and also the fact that it straddles the historic county boundary between Middlesex and Hertfordshire. The name is reflected in the council's coat of arms, which shows a hart upon the battlements of a boundary wall.

The district was awarded borough status on 15 April 1977, allowing the chair of the council to take the title of mayor.

The borough was originally in the Metropolitan Police District, despite being outside the modern Greater London boundaries. It was transferred to Hertfordshire Constabulary in 2000.

Under current local government reorganisation plans, all district councils in Hertfordshire, as well as the county council, will be abolished in 2028, with the district becoming part of a new South West Hertfordshire unitary authority.

== Film studios ==
Hertsmere is the location of Elstree Film and TV Studios, which produces such shows as Strictly Come Dancing, Who Wants to Be a Millionaire?, Dancing on Ice, and was the location for the Big Brother house. The studios were bought by Hertsmere Borough Council in 1996 and are now operated via Elstree Film Studios Limited, a council-controlled company.

Hertsmere is also the location for BBC Elstree Centre, the site of EastEnders, Holby City, and formerly the home to Top of the Pops, before its move to BBC TV Centre.

The area was also home to other TV and film studios, including MGM, until this was demolished for residential development, and is now an area called Studio Way.

== Governance ==
Hertsmere Borough Council

Type
- Type: Non-metropolitan district council

Leadership
- Mayor: Parveen Rani, Labour since 20 May 2026
- Leader: Jeremy Newmark, Labour since 17 May 2023
- Chief Executive: Sajida Bijle since 25 January 2020

Structure
- Seats: 39 councillors
- Political groups: Administration (19) Labour (12) Liberal Democrats (7) Other parties (20) Conservative (15) Reform (2) Hertsmere First (3)

Elections
- Last election: 4 May 2023
- Next election: 2027

Meeting place
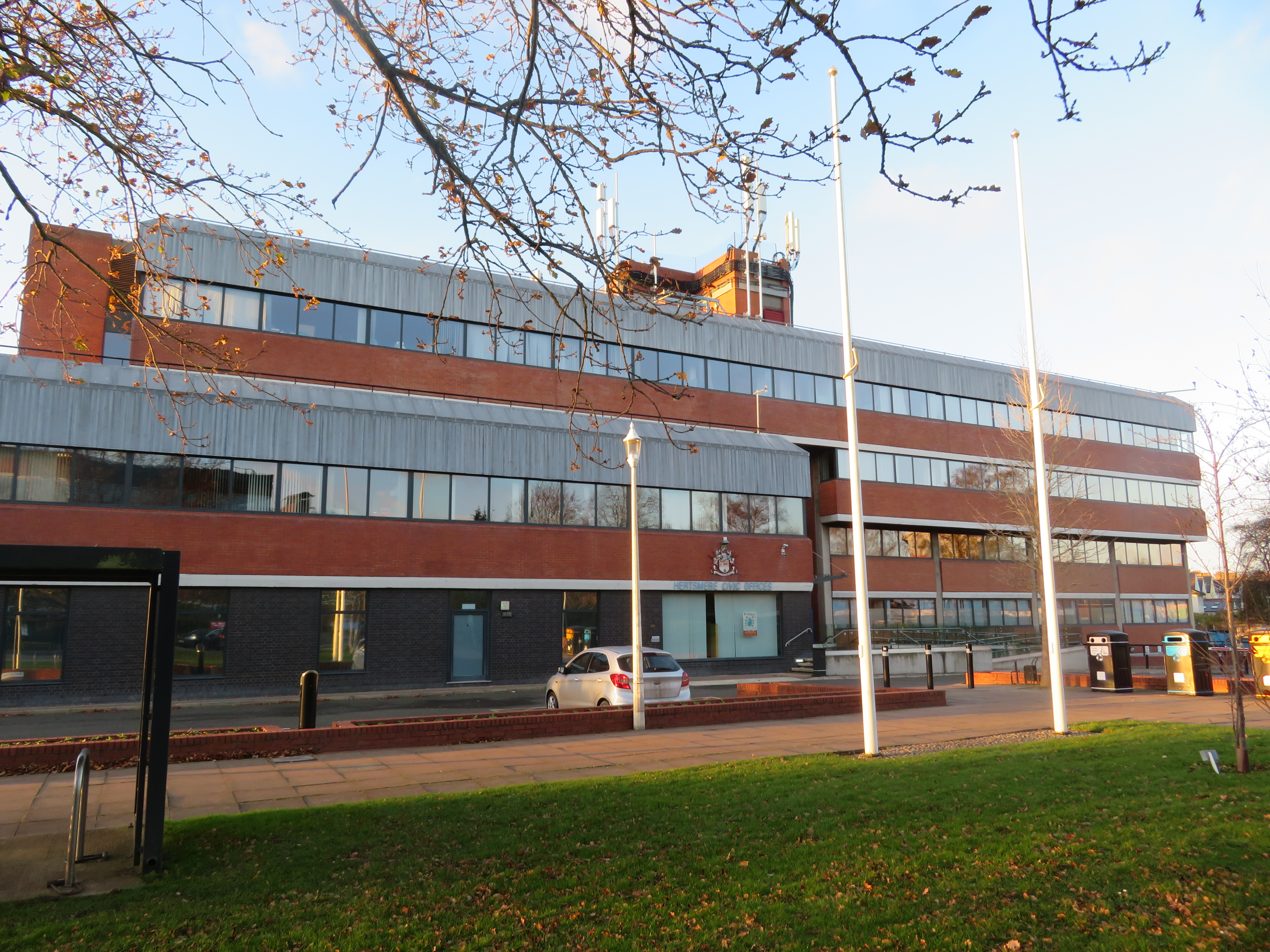
- Civic Offices, Elstree Way, Borehamwood, WD6 1WA

Website
- www.hertsmere.gov.uk

Hertsmere
- Crest: On a Wreath Argent and Azure in front of an Oak Tree proper fructed Or a demi Hart Royal guardant proper gorged with a Mural Crown Or and resting the sinister forehoof on a Cinematograph Spool loaded with film proper.
- Shield: Or on an embattled Wall of grey stone throughout in base Proper pierced with a gate therein a portcullis raised Sable a hart royal at gaze Proper.
- Supporters: On either side a Hart Royal guardant proper gorged with a Mural Crown Or that on the dexter charged on the shoulder with an Artist's Palette proper and that on the sinister with a Potter's Wheel Or.
- Motto: Do Well And Fear Not
- Badge: On a Roundel Or environed of a Garland of Oak proper fructed Or issuant from an embattled Wall of grey stone throughout in base a Hart Royal's Head affronty proper.
- Granted 5 September 1975

Hertfordshire has a two-tier structure of local government, with the ten district councils (including Hertsmere Borough Council) providing district-level services, and Hertfordshire County Council providing county-level services. In some areas there is an additional third tier of civil parishes.

=== Political control ===
The council went under no overall control at the 2023 election. Prior to that election the Conservatives had held a majority of the seats on the council since 1999. Whilst the Conservatives were still the largest party on the council, a Labour and Liberal Democrat coalition formed to take control of the council instead. They currently operate as a minority administration, with a total of 19 members out of Hertsmere’s 39 councillors. Labour group leader Jeremy Newmark became leader of the council and Liberal Democrat group leader Paul Richards became deputy leader of the council. Newmark narrowly survived a vote of no confidence in his leadership when a call from the Conservative group for Newmark to resign lost by a single vote at a council meeting on Wednesday, 26 March 2025.

The first elections to Hertsmere District Council were held in 1973, initially acting as a shadow authority alongside the outgoing authorities until the new arrangements took effect on 1 April 1974. Political control since 1974 has been as follows:

Party in control	Years
No overall control	1974–1976
Conservative	1976–1994
No overall control	1994–1996
Labour	1996–1999
Conservative	1999–2023
No overall control	2023–present

=== Leadership ===
The role of mayor is largely ceremonial in Hertsmere, and is usually held by a different councillor each year. Political leadership is provided by the leader of the council. The leaders since 1996 have been:

Councillor	Party	From	To
Bryan Stanley	Labour	1996	1999
Stuart Nagler	Conservative	26 May 1999	17 Oct 2001
Neil Payne	Conservative	17 Oct 2001	20 Sep 2006
John Graham	Conservative	20 Sep 2006	8 Oct 2007
Morris Bright	Conservative	8 Oct 2007	17 May 2023
Jeremy Newmark	Labour	17 May 2023	

=== Composition ===
Following the 2023 election and subsequent changes up to June 2026, the composition of the council was:

Party	Councillors
Conservative	15
Labour	12
Liberal Democrats	7
Reform	2
Hertsmere First Independent	3
Total	39

The Hertsmere First Independent councillors were elected as independents, but subsequently registered themselves as a political party with the Electoral Commission in February 2026.

The next elections are scheduled for 2027.

=== Premises ===
The council inherited offices at Rudolph Road in Bushey, Darkes Lane in Potters Bar, and Shenley Road in Borehamwood from its predecessor authorities. A new building, called Hertsmere Civic Offices, was built in 1975–1976 on Elstree Way in Borehamwood to serve as the council's principal offices and meeting place.

== Elections ==
Since the last boundary changes in 2019, the council comprises 39 councillors elected from 16 wards, each of which returns either two or three councillors. Elections for the whole council are held every four years.

=== Wards ===
The borough's 16 wards are:

- Aldenham East
- Aldenham West
- Bentley Heath and The Royds
- Borehamwood Brookmeadow
- Borehamwood Cowley Hill
- Borehamwood Hillside
- Borehamwood Kenilworth
- Bushey Heath
- Bushey North
- Bushey Park
- Bushey St James
- Elstree
- Potters Bar Furzefield
- Potters Bar Oakmere
- Potters Bar Parkfield
- Shenley

=== Wider politics ===
Prior to 1983, the borough was included in the parliamentary constituency of Hertfordshire South. In 1983 the constituency was renamed Hertsmere, whose current MP is Oliver Dowden of the Conservative Party, who served as deputy Prime Minister from 2023 to 2024.

Until 2024, the constituency was coterminous with the district, but since the boundary changes which took effect at that election, this has no longer been the case.

All but one of the wards in Hertsmere district still belong to the constituency of the same name, but Bushey North ward in Hertsmere district is instead now part of Watford constituency, whose current MP is Matt Turmaine of the Labour Party. All but one of the wards in Hertsmere constituency are part of Hertsmere district, but the seat now also includes the Northaw & Cuffley ward from Welwyn Hatfield district.

== Civic Awards ==
In 2003, the Borough Council started to present a small number of Civic Awards to people who live or work in Hertsmere 'in recognition of work undertaken for the benefit of residents of the Borough'.

== Parishes ==
Faith in Hertsmere (2021)
1. Christian (41.8%)
2. No Religion (24.2%)
3. Jewish (17.0%)
4. Hindu (4.90%)
5. Muslim (3.80%)
6. Buddhist (0.60%)
7. Sikh (0.20%)
8. Other Religions (1.00%)
9. Religion not Stated (6.50%)

The borough contains five parishes:

- Aldenham (includes Radlett)
- Elstree and Borehamwood (Town)
- Hertsmere Meriden
- Shenley
- South Mimms and Ridge

Four of the parishes have parish councils, with Hertsmere Meriden instead having only a parish meeting. Bushey and Potters Bar are unparished areas, being directly administered by Hertsmere Borough Council.

== Demographics ==
The 2011 census showed that Hertsmere was the second most Jewish local authority area in the United Kingdom, with Jews comprising one in seven residents (the area with the highest Jewish population being the London Borough of Barnet). In the 2021 census Hertsmere overtook Barnet to become the most Jewish local authority area, with Jews comprising one in every six residents. Jews form a plurality of the population in two wards of the borough, Bushey Heath and Elstree.
