= 1992 United Kingdom local elections =

- 7 May 1992

All 36 metropolitan boroughs, 114 out of 296 English districts and all 53 Scottish districts
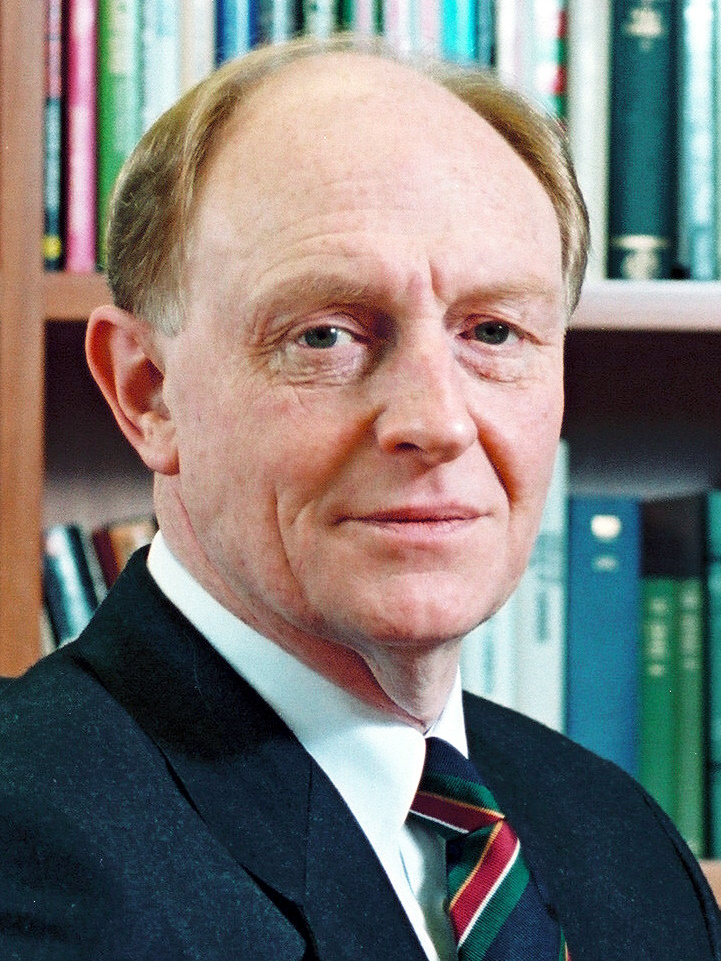

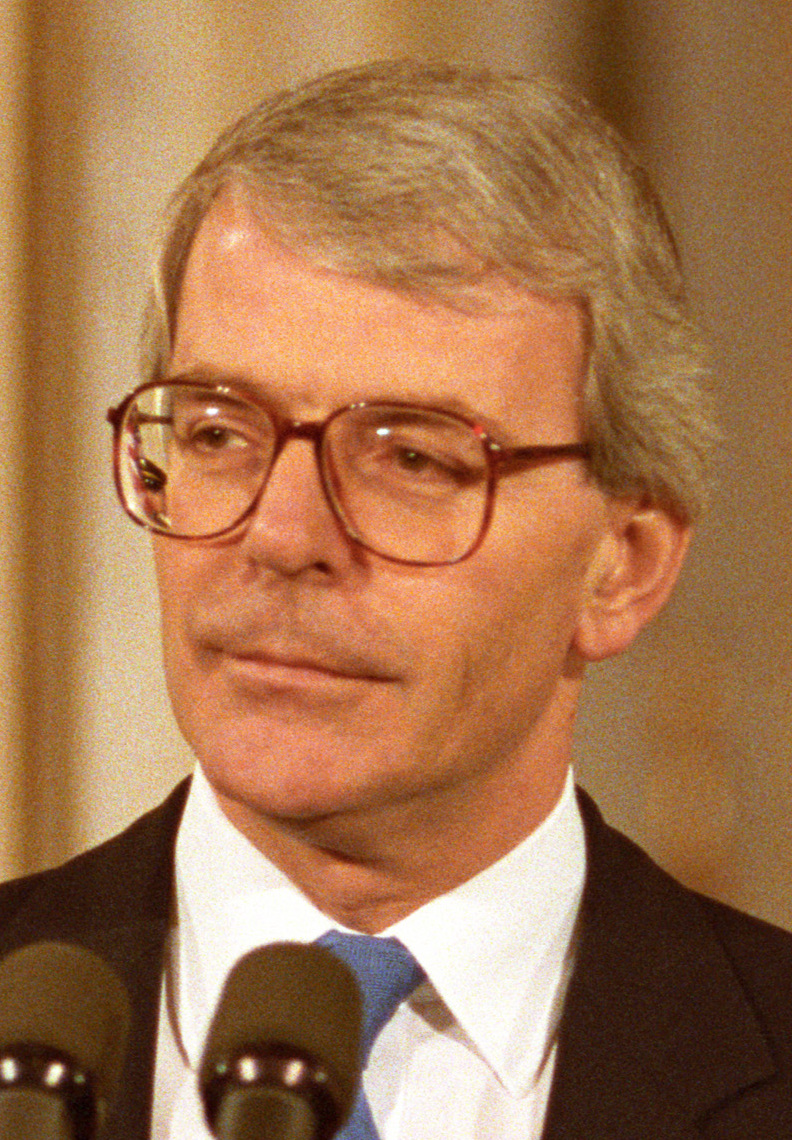

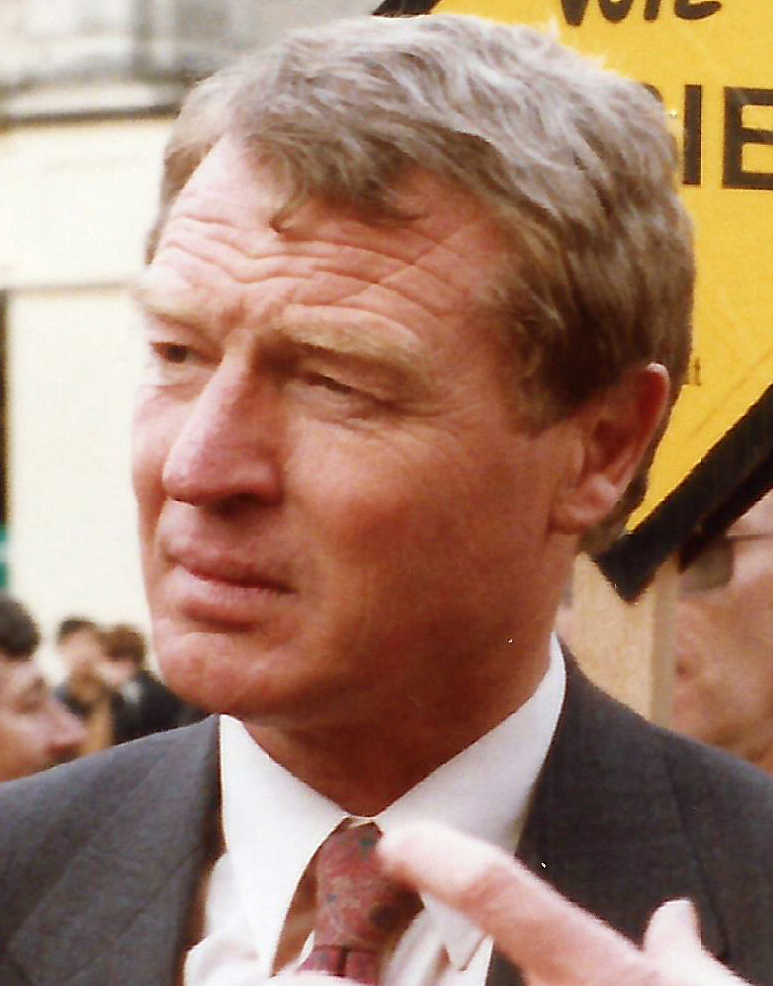
	Majority party	Minority party	Third party
Leader	Neil Kinnock	John Major	Paddy Ashdown
Party	Labour	Conservative	Liberal Democrats
Leader since	2 October 1983	27 November 1990	16 July 1988
Percentage	30%	46%	20%
Councillors	9,102	8,288	3,728
Councillors +/-	▼402	▲303	▲56

The 1992 United Kingdom local elections were held on Thursday 7 May 1992, one month after the 1992 general election which returned the governing Conservative Party for a fourth consecutive term in office. The Conservatives won back some ground that they had lost the previous year.

The Conservative Party gained 303 seats, bringing their number of councillors to 8,288. Their share of the vote was projected to be 46%, their highest for many years.

The main opposition Labour Party lost 402 seats and were left with 9,102 councillors. Their projected share of the vote was 30%, their lowest since 1982. Neil Kinnock was still party leader at this stage, although he had already declared his intention to resign from the position as soon as a new leader was elected; his successor was John Smith, who won the leadership contest against Bryan Gould on 18 July 1992.

The Liberal Democrats gained 56 seats and had 3,728 councillors following the elections.

== England ==
=== Metropolitan boroughs ===
All 36 metropolitan borough councils had one third of their seats up for election.

Council	Previous control	Result	Details
Barnsley	Labour	Labour hold	Details
Birmingham	Labour	Labour hold	Details
Bolton	Labour	Labour hold	Details
Bradford	Labour	Labour hold	Details
Bury	Labour	No overall control gain	Details
Calderdale	Labour	No overall control gain	Details
Coventry	Labour	Labour hold	Details
Doncaster	Labour	Labour hold	Details
Dudley	Labour	No overall control gain	Details
Gateshead	Labour	Labour hold	Details
Kirklees	Labour	Labour hold	Details
Knowsley	Labour	Labour hold	Details
Leeds	Labour	Labour hold	Details
Liverpool	Labour	No overall control gain	Details
Manchester	Labour	Labour hold	Details
Newcastle upon Tyne	Labour	Labour hold	Details
North Tyneside	Labour	Labour hold	Details
Oldham	Labour	Labour hold	Details
Rochdale	Labour	No overall control gain	Details
Rotherham	Labour	Labour hold	Details
Salford	Labour	Labour hold	Details
Sandwell	Labour	Labour hold	Details
Sefton	No overall control	No overall control hold	Details
Sheffield	Labour	Labour hold	Details
Solihull	No overall control	No overall control hold	Details
South Tyneside	Labour	Labour hold	Details
St Helens	Labour	Labour hold	Details
Stockport	No overall control	No overall control hold	Details
Sunderland	Labour	Labour hold	Details
Tameside	Labour	Labour hold	Details
Trafford	Conservative	Conservative hold	Details
Wakefield	Labour	Labour hold	Details
Walsall	Labour	No overall control gain	Details
Wigan	Labour	Labour hold	Details
Wirral	Labour	No overall control gain	Details
Wolverhampton	Labour	No overall control gain	Details

=== District councils ===
==== Whole council ====
In one district the whole council was up for election as there were new ward boundaries, following a further electoral boundary review by the Local Government Boundary Commission for England.

Council	Previous control	Result	Details
Basingstoke and Deane	Conservative	Conservative hold	Details

==== Third of council ====
In 113 districts one third of the council was up for election.

Council	Previous control	Result	Details
Adur	Liberal Democrats	Liberal Democrats hold	Details
Amber Valley	Labour	Labour hold	Details
Barrow-in-Furness	No overall control	No overall control hold	Details
Basildon	No overall control	Conservative gain	Details
Bassetlaw	Labour	Labour hold	Details
Bath	No overall control	No overall control hold	Details
Bedford	No overall control	No overall control hold	Details
Blackburn	Labour	Labour hold	Details
Brentwood	No overall control	Liberal Democrats gain	Details
Brighton	Labour	Labour hold	Details
Bristol	Labour	Labour hold	Details
Broadland	Conservative	Conservative hold	Details
Broxbourne	Conservative	Conservative hold	Details
Burnley	Labour	Labour hold	Details
Cambridge	Labour	No overall control gain	Details
Cannock Chase	Labour	Labour hold	Details
Carlisle	Labour	Labour hold	Details
Cheltenham	Liberal Democrats	Liberal Democrats hold	Details
Cherwell	Conservative	Conservative hold	Details
Chester	No overall control	No overall control hold	Details
Chorley	No overall control	No overall control hold	Details
Colchester	No overall control	No overall control hold	Details
Congleton	Liberal Democrats	No overall control gain	Details
Craven	No overall control	No overall control hold	Details
Crawley	Labour	Labour hold	Details
Crewe and Nantwich	Labour	Labour hold	Details
Daventry	Conservative	Conservative hold	Details
Derby	No overall control	No overall control hold	Details
Eastbourne	Liberal Democrats	Liberal Democrats hold	Details
Eastleigh	No overall control	No overall control hold	Details
Ellesmere Port and Neston	Labour	Labour hold	Details
Elmbridge	No overall control	No overall control hold	Details
Epping Forest	Conservative	Conservative hold	Details
Exeter	No overall control	No overall control hold	Details
Fareham	Conservative	Conservative hold	Details
Gillingham	No overall control	No overall control hold	Details
Gloucester	No overall control	No overall control hold	Details
Gosport	Liberal Democrats	Liberal Democrats hold	Details
Great Grimsby	Labour	Labour hold	Details
Great Yarmouth	Labour	Labour hold	Details
Halton	Labour	Labour hold	Details
Harlow	Labour	Labour hold	Details
Harrogate	No overall control	No overall control hold	Details
Hart	No overall control	No overall control hold	Details
Hartlepool	Labour	Labour hold	Details
Hastings	No overall control	No overall control hold	Details
Havant	No overall control	No overall control hold	Details
Hereford	Liberal Democrats	Liberal Democrats hold	Details
Hertsmere	Conservative	Conservative hold	Details
Huntingdonshire	Conservative	Conservative hold	Details
Hyndburn	Labour	Labour hold	Details
Ipswich	Labour	Labour hold	Details
Kingston upon Hull	Labour	Labour hold	Details
Leominster	Independent	Independent hold	Details
Lincoln	Labour	Labour hold	Details
Macclesfield	Conservative	Conservative hold	Details
Maidstone	No overall control	No overall control hold	Details
Milton Keynes	Labour	No overall control gain	Details
Mole Valley	No overall control	No overall control hold	Details
Newcastle-under-Lyme	Labour	Labour hold	Details
North Hertfordshire	Conservative	Conservative hold	Details
Norwich	Labour	Labour hold	Details
Nuneaton and Bedworth	Labour	Labour hold	Details
Oxford	Labour	Labour hold	Details
Pendle	Labour	Labour hold	Details
Penwith	No overall control	No overall control hold	Details
Peterborough	No overall control	No overall control hold	Details
Portsmouth	No overall control	No overall control hold	Details
Preston	Labour	Labour hold	Details
Purbeck	No overall control	No overall control hold	Details
Reading	Labour	Labour hold	Details
Redditch	Labour	Labour hold	Details
Reigate and Banstead	No overall control	No overall control hold	Details
Rochford	No overall control	No overall control hold	Details
Rossendale	Labour	Labour hold	Details
Rugby	No overall control	No overall control hold	Details
Runnymede	Conservative	Conservative hold	Details
Rushmoor	Conservative	Conservative hold	Details
Scunthorpe	Labour	Labour hold	Details
Shrewsbury and Atcham	No overall control	No overall control hold	Details
Slough	Labour	Labour hold	Details
South Bedfordshire	Conservative	Conservative hold	Details
South Cambridgeshire	Independent	No overall control gain	Details
South Herefordshire	Independent	Independent hold	Details
South Lakeland	No overall control	No overall control hold	Details
Southampton	Labour	Labour hold	Details
Southend-on-Sea	Conservative	Conservative hold	Details
St Albans	No overall control	No overall control hold	Details
Stevenage	Labour	Labour hold	Details
Stoke-on-Trent	Labour	Labour hold	Details
Stratford-on-Avon	No overall control	Conservative gain	Details
Stroud	No overall control	No overall control hold	Details
Swale	No overall control	No overall control hold	Details
Tamworth	Labour	Labour hold	Details
Tandridge	No overall control	No overall control hold	Details
Thamesdown	Labour	Labour hold	Details
Three Rivers	No overall control	No overall control hold	Details
Thurrock	Labour	Labour hold	Details
Tunbridge Wells	Conservative	Conservative hold	Details
Watford	Labour	Labour hold	Details
Waveney	Labour	Labour hold	Details
Welwyn Hatfield	Labour	Conservative gain	Details
West Lancashire	No overall control	No overall control hold	Details
West Lindsey	No overall control	No overall control hold	Details
West Oxfordshire	Independent	No overall control gain	Details
Weymouth and Portland	No overall control	No overall control hold	Details
Winchester	No overall control	No overall control hold	Details
Woking	No overall control	Conservative gain	Details
Wokingham	Conservative	Conservative hold	Details
Worcester	Labour	Labour hold	Details
Worthing	Conservative	Conservative hold	Details
Wyre Forest	No overall control	No overall control hold	Details
York	Labour	Labour hold	Details

== Scotland ==
=== District councils ===
These were the last elections to the district councils before they were abolished by the Local Government etc. (Scotland) Act 1994.

Council	Previous control	Result	Details
Aberdeen	No overall control	Labour gain	Details
Angus	SNP	SNP hold	Details
Annandale and Eskdale	Liberal Democrats	Liberal Democrats hold	Details
Argyll	Independent	Independent hold	Details
Badenoch and Strathspey	Independent	Independent hold	Details
Banff and Buchan	Independent	Independent hold	Details
Bearsden and Milngavie	Conservative	No overall control gain	Details
Berwickshire	Conservative	Conservative hold	Details
Caithness	Independent	Independent hold	Details
Clackmannan	Labour	Labour hold	Details
Clydebank	Labour	Labour hold	Details
Clydesdale	Labour	No overall control gain	Details
Cumbernauld and Kilsyth	No overall control	Labour gain	Details
Cumnock and Doon Valley	Labour	Labour hold	Details
Cunninghame	Labour	Labour hold	Details
Dumbarton	No overall control	No overall control hold	Details
Dundee	Labour	Labour hold	Details
Dunfermline	Labour	Labour hold	Details
East Kilbride	Labour	Labour hold	Details
East Lothian	Labour	Labour hold	Details
Eastwood	Conservative	Conservative hold	Details
Edinburgh	Labour	No overall control gain	Details
Ettrick and Lauderdale	Independent	Independent hold	Details
Falkirk	Labour	No overall control gain	Details
Glasgow	Labour	Labour hold	Details
Gordon	No overall control	Independent gain	Details
Hamilton	Labour	Labour hold	Details
Inverclyde	Labour	Labour hold	Details
Inverness	Independent	No overall control gain	Details
Kilmarnock and Loudoun	Labour	No overall control gain	Details
Kincardine and Deeside	Independent	No overall control gain	Details
Kirkcaldy	Labour	Labour hold	Details
Kyle and Carrick	Labour	Conservative gain	Details
Lochaber	Independent	No overall control gain	Details
Midlothian	Labour	Labour hold	Details
Monklands	Labour	Labour hold	Details
Moray	Independent	No overall control gain	Details
Motherwell	Labour	Labour hold	Details
Nairn	Independent	Independent hold	Details
Nithsdale	Labour	No overall control gain	Details
North-East Fife	Liberal Democrats	Liberal Democrats hold	Details
Perth and Kinross	No overall control	Conservative gain	Details
Renfrew	Labour	Labour	Details
Ross and Cromarty	Independent	Independent hold	Details
Roxburgh	Independent	Independent hold	Details
Skye and Lochalsh	Independent	Independent hold	Details
Stewartry	Independent	Independent hold	Details
Stirling	Labour	No overall control gain	Details
Strathkelvin	Labour	Labour hold	Details
Sutherland	Independent	Independent hold	Details
Tweeddale	Independent	Independent hold	Details
West Lothian	Labour	No overall control gain	Details
Wigtown	Independent	Independent hold	Details
