= 1992 Scottish local elections =

- 7 May 1992
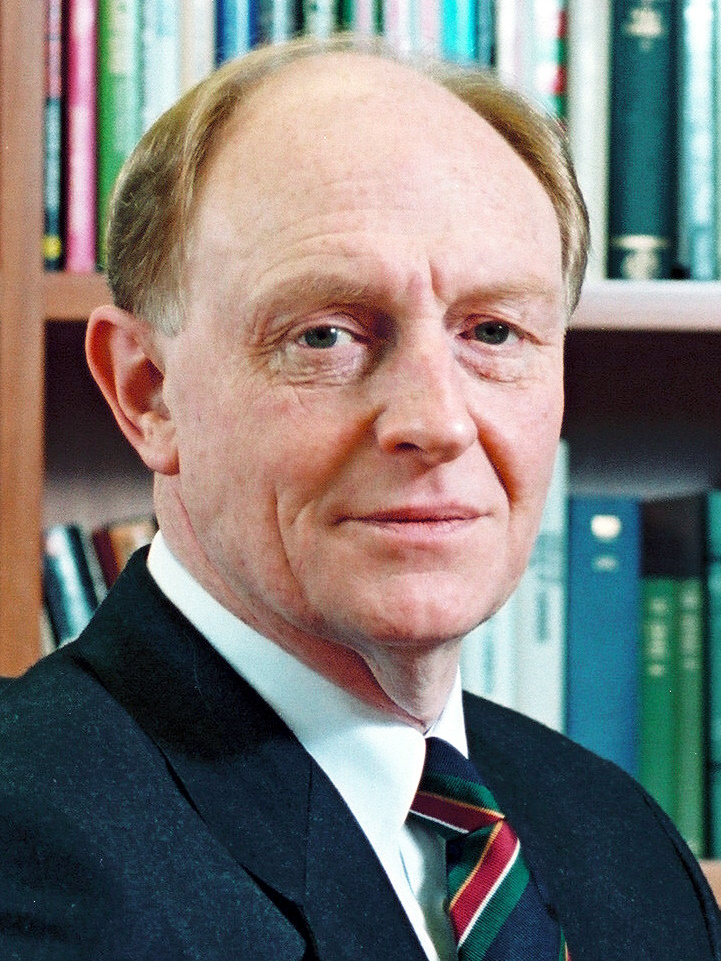

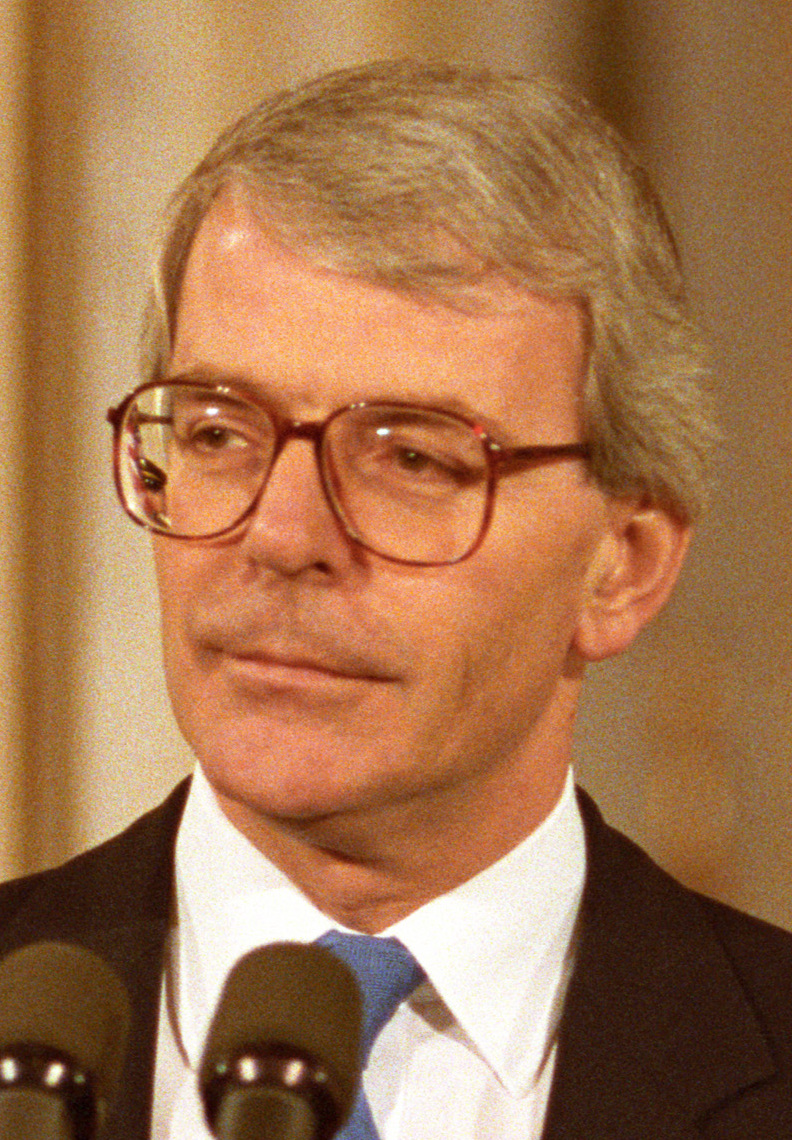

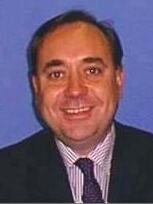

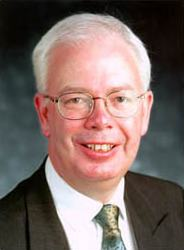
	First party	Second party
Leader	Neil Kinnock	John Major
Party	Labour	Conservative
Leader since	2 October 1983	27 November 1990
Seats won	468	204
Seat change	▼85	▲42
Percentage	34.0%	23.2%
Swing	▼8.6%	▲3.8%
	Third party	Fourth party
Leader	Alex Salmond	Jim Wallace
Party	SNP	Liberal Democrats
Leader since	22 September 1990	18 April 1992
Seats won	150	94
Seat change	▲37	▲10
Percentage	24.3%	9.5%
Swing	▲3.0%	▲1.1%
- Colours denote the winning party with outright control

Local elections were held in Scotland on 7 May 1992, to elect members to all 53 district councils. It was the last local election held under the Local Government (Scotland) Act 1973, which had established the two-tier system of regions and districts. Regional and district councils were abolished in 1996, and replaced with 29 new mainland unitary authorities under the terms of the Local Government etc. (Scotland) Act 1994.

== Overview ==
=== Background ===
There was some speculation that these elections would be the last under the present two-tier system, as a review of council areas had been announced by the incumbent Conservative Government (The last elections were in fact the 1994 regional elections). The elections were seen as a test of the Conservative Government elected a month before in April, where the Conservatives had increased their vote share, much to the surprise of pollsters.

=== Outcome ===
The election saw a decrease in turnout of more than 5%, the lowest since District Council elections were introduced in 1974. The number of women candidates increased to 26.7%, although only 21.5% of elected councillors were women, showing that the main parties often preferred to nominate men in wards where they had a better chance of winning. Labour saw a sharp fall on their vote share, down 8.5% from 1988. The main beneficiaries of this decline were the Conservatives, up 3.8%, but still in third place behind the SNP, who gained 3.0%. The Liberal Democrats also made modest gains, taking a new record of 95 seats.

=== Regional Trends ===
Labour held most of their strongholds in the central belt, as well as Dundee and Aberdeen; even though their vote share decreased more in these areas (Such as East Lothian, down 13% from 1988 and Glasgow, down 11.8%) than elsewhere. The Conservatives were most successful in places were they hadn't stood many (if any) candidates before, such as Clackmannan (where the party only stood two candidates in 1988). Independents remained the largest party in rural areas, while the Liberal Democrats held their two councils of North East Fife and Annandale and Eskdale.

== National results ==
Summary of the 1992 Scottish district council election results
Votes Total		Votes %	Seats
Labour	504,076	34.0	468
SNP	360,014	24.3	150
Conservative	343,358	23.2	204
Liberal Democrats	140,697	9.5	94
Independent	107,586	7.4	228
Other	26,057	1.9	14
Total	1,481,788		1,158

== Results by region ==
=== Borders ===
District	1988 result	1992 result	Turnout	Details
Berwickshire	Conservative	Conservative		Details
Ettrick and Lauderdale	Independent	Independent		Details
Roxburgh	Independent	Independent		Details
Tweeddale	Independent	Independent		Details

=== Central ===
District	1988 result	1992 result	Turnout	Details
Clackmannan	Labour	Labour		Details
Falkirk	Labour	No overall control		Details
Stirling	Labour	No overall control		Details

=== Dumfries and Galloway ===
District	1988 result	1992 result	Turnout	Details
Annandale and Eskdale	Liberal Democrats	Liberal Democrats		Details
Wigtown	Independent	Independent		Details
Nithsdale	Labour	No overall control		Details
Stewartry	Independent	Independent		Details

=== Fife ===
District	1988 result	1992 result	Turnout	Details
Dunfermline	Labour	Labour		Details
Kirkcaldy	Labour	Labour		Details
North-East Fife	Liberal Democrats	Liberal Democrats		Details

=== Grampian ===
District	1988 result	1992 result	Turnout	Details
Banff and Buchan	Independent	Independent		Details
City of Aberdeen	Labour	Labour		Details
Gordon	No overall control	Independent		Details
Kincardine and Deeside	Independent	No overall control		Details
Moray	Independent	No overall control		Details

=== Highland ===
District	1988 result	1992 result	Turnout	Details
Badenoch and Strathspey	Independent	Independent		Details
Caithness	Independent	Independent		Details
Inverness	Independent	No overall control		Details
Lochaber	Independent	No overall control		Details
Nairn	Independent	Independent		Details
Ross and Cromarty	Independent	Independent		Details
Skye and Lochalsh	Independent	Independent		Details
Sutherland	Independent	Independent		Details

=== Lothian ===
District	1988 result	1992 result	Turnout	Details
City of Edinburgh	Labour	No overall control		Details
East Lothian	Labour	Labour		Details
Midlothian	Labour	Labour		Details
West Lothian	Labour	No overall control		Details

=== Strathclyde ===
District	1988 result	1992 result	Turnout	Details
Argyll and Bute	Independent	Independent		Details
Bearsden and Milngavie	Conservative	No overall control		Details
Cumbernauld and Kilsyth	No overall control	Labour		Details
Clydebank	Labour	Labour		Details
Clydesdale	Labour	No overall control		Details
Cunninghame	Labour	Labour		Details
Cumnock and Doon Valley	Labour	Labour		Details
Dumbarton	No overall control	No overall control		Details
East Kilbride	Labour	Labour		Details
Eastwood	Conservative	Conservative		Details
City of Glasgow	Labour	Labour		Details
Hamilton	Labour	Labour		Details
Inverclyde	Labour	Labour		Details
Kilmarnock and Loudoun	Labour	No overall control		Details
Kyle and Carrick	Labour	Conservative		Details
Motherwell	Labour	Labour		Details
Monklands	Labour	Labour		Details
Renfrew	Labour	Labour		Details
Strathkelvin	Labour	Labour		Details

=== Tayside ===
District	1988 result	1992 result	Turnout	Details
Angus	SNP	SNP		Details
City of Dundee	Labour	Labour		Details
Perth and Kinross	No overall control	Conservative		Details
