= 1992 Welwyn Hatfield District Council election =

Welwyn Hatfield District Council election

The 1992 Welwyn Hatfield District Council election took place on 7 May 1992 to elect members of Welwyn Hatfield District Council in England. This was on the same day as other local elections.

At the election, the Conservatives became the largest party on the council, assuming control of the authority for the first time since 1978.

== Summary ==
=== Election result ===
1992 Welwyn Hatfield District Council election
| Party | This election | | | Full council | | | This election | | |
| Party | Seats | Net | Seats % | Other | Total | Total % | Votes | Votes % | +/− |
|---|---|---|---|---|---|---|---|---|---|
| Conservative | 10 | ▲3 | 66.7 | 14 | 24 | 51.1 | 16,962 | 53.0 | +5.3 |
| Labour | 5 | ▼3 | 33.3 | 18 | 23 | 48.9 | 10,973 | 34.3 | –4.9 |
| Liberal Democrats | 0 | Steady | 0.0 | 0 | 0 | 0.0 | 4,068 | 12.7 | +0.9 |
