= 1992 Waveney District Council election =

1992 English local government election

- 7 May 1992

All 48 seats to Waveney District Council 25 seats needed for a majority

	First party	Second party
Party	Labour	Conservative
Seats won	6	9
Seats after	26	17
Seat change	▼1	▲3
Popular vote	10,838	12,517
Percentage	39.4%	45.5%
Swing	▼6.6%	▲9.3%
	Third party	Fourth party
Party	Liberal Democrats	Independent
Seats won	1	0
Seats after	5	0
Seat change	▼1	▼1
Popular vote	3,603	558
Percentage	13.1%	2.0%
Swing	▼2.3%	▲0.9%
- Winner of each seat at the 1992 Waveney District Council election.
Control before election
Labour
Control after election
Labour

The 1992 Waveney District Council election took place on 7 May 1992 to elect members of Waveney District Council in Suffolk, England. This was on the same day as other local elections.

== Summary ==
=== Election result ===
1992 Waveney District Council election
Party	This election			Full council			This election		
Party	Seats	Net	Seats %	Other	Total	Total %	Votes	Votes %	+/−
Labour	6	▼1	37.5	20	26	54.2	10,838	39.4	–6.6
Conservative	9	▲3	56.3	8	17	35.4	12,517	45.5	+9.3
Liberal Democrats	1	▼1	6.3	4	5	10.4	3,603	13.1	–2.3
Independent	0	▼1	0.0	0	0	0.0	558	2.0	+0.9

== Ward results ==
Incumbent councillors standing for re-election are marked with an asterisk (*). Changes in seats do not take into account by-elections or defections.

=== Beccles Town ===
Beccles Town
Party	Candidate	Votes	%	±%
Conservative	K. Savage	989	48.3	
Labour	P. Baker	723	35.3	
Liberal Democrats	M. Knox	334	16.3	
Majority		266	13.0	
Turnout		2,046	37.0	
Registered electors		5,571		
Conservative hold		Swing		

=== Beccles Worlingham ===
Beccles Worlingham
Party	Candidate	Votes	%	±%
Conservative	P. Tregear	643	51.1	
Labour	E. Torlot	615	48.9	
Majority		28	2.2	
Turnout		1,258	33.0	
Registered electors		3,837		
Conservative gain from Labour		Swing		

=== Bungay ===
Bungay
Party	Candidate	Votes	%	±%
Labour	D. Jermy	683	37.2	
Conservative	P. Scott	662	36.1	
Liberal Democrats	D. O'Neill*	491	26.7	
Majority		21	1.1	
Turnout		1,836	49.0	
Registered electors		3,759		
Labour gain from Liberal Democrats		Swing		

=== Carlton ===
Carlton
Party	Candidate	Votes	%	±%
Conservative	D. Collins*	1,287	57.4	
Labour	K. Hunting	666	29.7	
Liberal Democrats	C. Thomas	288	12.9	
Majority		621	27.7	
Turnout		2,241	35.0	
Registered electors		6,205		
Conservative hold		Swing		

=== Carlton Colville ===
Carlton Colville
Party	Candidate	Votes	%	±%
Conservative	R. Bell	595	41.1	
Independent	J. Mitchell*	558	38.6	
Labour	R. Jack	293	20.3	
Majority		37	2.6	
Turnout		1,446	35.0	
Registered electors		4,129		
Conservative gain from Independent		Swing		

=== Gunton ===
Gunton
Party	Candidate	Votes	%	±%
Conservative	J. Wright*	1,190	56.1	
Liberal Democrats	S. Tonge	507	23.9	
Labour	C. Ellerby	425	20.0	
Majority		683	32.2	
Turnout		2,122	41.0	
Registered electors		5,195		
Conservative hold		Swing		

=== Halesworth ===
Halesworth
Party	Candidate	Votes	%	±%
Conservative	S. Burroughes	961	59.6	
Labour	A. Martin	652	40.4	
Majority		309	19.2	
Turnout		1,613	44.0	
Registered electors		3,691		
Conservative gain from Labour		Swing		

=== Harbour ===
Harbour
Party	Candidate	Votes	%	±%
Labour	S. Bostock*	678	62.7	
Conservative	L. Guy	323	29.9	
Liberal Democrats	R. Paterson	81	7.5	
Majority		355	32.8	
Turnout		1,082	27.0	
Registered electors		4,037		
Labour hold		Swing		

=== Kessingland ===
Kessingland
Party	Candidate	Votes	%	±%
Conservative	J. Abel*	655	52.4	
Labour	A. Clarke	594	47.6	
Majority		61	4.9	
Turnout		1,249	35.0	
Registered electors		3,569		
Conservative hold		Swing		

=== Kirkley ===
Kirkley
Party	Candidate	Votes	%	±%
Liberal Democrats	K. Pointon	819	45.4	
Labour	D. Anderson	588	32.6	
Conservative	H. Durie	398	22.0	
Majority		231	12.8	
Turnout		1,805	40.0	
Registered electors		4,502		
Liberal Democrats hold		Swing		

=== Normanston ===
Normanston
Party	Candidate	Votes	%	±%
Labour	M. Ayers*	720	58.8	
Conservative	S. Pender	352	28.7	
Liberal Democrats	I. Burnett	153	12.5	
Majority		368	30.0	
Turnout		1,225	27.0	
Registered electors		4,498		
Labour hold		Swing		

=== Oulton Broad ===
Oulton Broad
Party	Candidate	Votes	%	±%
Conservative	B. Reader	1,021	47.9	
Labour	G. Stewart	675	31.7	
Liberal Democrats	A. Tibbitt	434	20.4	
Majority		346	16.2	
Turnout		2,130	40.0	
Registered electors		5,323		
Conservative hold		Swing		

=== Pakefield ===
Pakefield
Party	Candidate	Votes	%	±%
Labour	R. Thorne	1,071	46.3	
Conservative	F. Gaimster	995	43.0	
Liberal Democrats	M. Carroll	246	10.6	
Majority		76	3.3	
Turnout		2,312	41.0	
Registered electors		5,583		
Labour hold		Swing		

=== Southwold ===
Southwold
Party	Candidate	Votes	%	±%
Conservative	J. Goldsmith*	1,504	69.5	
Labour	D. Breach	661	30.5	
Majority		843	38.9	
Turnout		2,165	42.0	
Registered electors		5,103		
Conservative hold		Swing		

=== St. Margarets ===
St. Margarets
Party	Candidate	Votes	%	±%
Labour	A. Brooks	840	55.3	
Conservative	J. Albrow	550	36.2	
Liberal Democrats	D. Randoll	128	8.4	
Majority		290	19.1	
Turnout		1,518	28.0	
Registered electors		5,417		
Labour hold		Swing		

=== Whitton ===
Whitton
Party	Candidate	Votes	%	±%
Labour	R. Carter*	954	65.0	
Conservative	A. Gowers	392	26.7	
Liberal Democrats	G. Stracham	122	8.3	
Majority		562	38.3	
Turnout		1,468	33.0	
Registered electors		4,459		
Labour hold		Swing		

== By-elections ==
=== Normanston ===
Normanston by-election: 17 September 1992
Party	Candidate	Votes	%	±%
Labour		877	68.6	
Conservative		205	16.0	
Liberal Democrats		197	15.4	
Majority		672	52.5	
Turnout		1,279	28.0	
Registered electors		4,568		
Labour hold		Swing		

=== Wainford ===
Wainford by-election: 6 May 1993
Party	Candidate	Votes	%	±%
Labour		214	41.2	
Conservative		213	41.0	
Liberal Democrats		93	17.9	
Majority		1	0.2	
Turnout		520	42.8	
Registered electors		1,215		
Labour hold		Swing		
