= 1992 Worthing Borough Council election =

1992 English local election

- 7 May 1992

12 out of 36 seats to Worthing Borough Council 19 seats needed for a majority

| | First party | Second party |
|---|---|---|
| Party | Conservative | Liberal Democrats |
| Last election | 24 seats, 45.8% | 12 seats, 40.9% |
| Seats won | 8 | 4 |
| Seats after | 22 | 14 |
| Seat change | ▼2 | ▲2 |
| Popular vote | 14,959 | 12,116 |
| Percentage | 51.0% | 41.3% |
| Swing | ▲5.2% | ▲0.4% |
Council control before election
Conservative
Council control after election
Conservative

The 1992 Worthing Borough Council election took place on 7 May 1992 to elect members of Worthing Borough Council in West Sussex, England. This was on the same day as other local elections.

== Summary ==
=== Election result ===
1992 Worthing Borough Council election
| Party | This election | | | | Full council | | | This election | | |
| Party | Candidates | Seats | Net | Seats % | Other | Total | Total % | Votes | Votes % | +/− |
|---|---|---|---|---|---|---|---|---|---|---|
| Conservative | {{{candidates}}} | 8 | ▼2 | 66.7 | 14 | 22 | 61.1 | 14,959 | 51.0 | +5.2 |
| Liberal Democrats | {{{candidates}}} | 4 | ▲2 | 33.3 | 10 | 14 | 38.9 | 12,116 | 41.3 | +0.4 |
| Labour | {{{candidates}}} | 0 | Steady | 0.0 | 0 | 0 | 0.0 | 1,723 | 5.9 | –4.8 |
| Green | {{{candidates}}} | 0 | Steady | 0.0 | 0 | 0 | 0.0 | 533 | 1.8 | –0.4 |

== Ward results ==
=== Broadwater ===
Broadwater
| Party | Candidate | Votes | % | ±% |
|---|---|---|---|---|
| Liberal Democrats | B. McLuskie* | 1,232 | 60.7 | –3.1 |
| Conservative | C. Boustead | 629 | 31.0 | +3.8 |
| Labour | A. Dyball | 96 | 4.7 | –4.3 |
| Green | D. Croft | 73 | 3.6 | N/A |
| Majority | | 603 | 29.7 | –6.9 |
| Turnout | | 2,030 | 31.5 | –6.2 |
| Registered electors | | 6,459 | | |
| Liberal Democrats hold | | Swing | ▼3.5 | |

=== Castle ===
Castle
| Party | Candidate | Votes | % | ±% |
|---|---|---|---|---|
| Liberal Democrats | G. Cornell | 1,211 | 54.3 | +6.7 |
| Conservative | C. Wallis | 855 | 38.3 | +3.9 |
| Labour | K. Fisher | 166 | 7.4 | –10.6 |
| Majority | | 356 | 15.9 | +2.7 |
| Turnout | | 2,232 | 36.4 | –11.1 |
| Registered electors | | 6,130 | | |
| Liberal Democrats gain from Conservative | | Swing | ▲1.4 | |

=== Central ===
Central
| Party | Candidate | Votes | % | ±% |
|---|---|---|---|---|
| Liberal Democrats | M. Tucker | 1,080 | 54.7 | –3.0 |
| Conservative | R. Price | 773 | 39.1 | +4.4 |
| Labour | J. Del Rio Fernandez | 80 | 4.0 | –3.6 |
| Green | D. Colkett | 43 | 2.2 | N/A |
| Majority | | 307 | 15.5 | –7.5 |
| Turnout | | 1,976 | 33.6 | –6.0 |
| Registered electors | | 5,880 | | |
| Liberal Democrats gain from Conservative | | Swing | ▼3.7 | |

=== Durrington ===
Durrington
| Party | Candidate | Votes | % | ±% |
|---|---|---|---|---|
| Conservative | V. Sutton* | 1,536 | 54.6 | +10.7 |
| Liberal Democrats | J. Rose | 1,052 | 37.4 | –0.5 |
| Labour | D. Haworth | 148 | 5.3 | –4.0 |
| Green | J. Hughes | 78 | 2.8 | –6.1 |
| Majority | | 484 | 17.2 | +11.2 |
| Turnout | | 2,814 | 37.6 | –6.0 |
| Registered electors | | 7,500 | | |
| Conservative hold | | Swing | ▲5.6 | |

=== Gaisford ===
Gaisford
| Party | Candidate | Votes | % | ±% |
|---|---|---|---|---|
| Conservative | S. Bell | 1,199 | 49.1 | +9.1 |
| Liberal Democrats | G. Miller* | 1,151 | 47.1 | –0.2 |
| Labour | C. Tempest | 92 | 3.8 | –3.0 |
| Majority | | 48 | 2.0 | N/A |
| Turnout | | 2,442 | 38.6 | –3.3 |
| Registered electors | | 6,332 | | |
| Conservative gain from Liberal Democrats | | Swing | ▲4.7 | |

=== Goring ===
Goring
| Party | Candidate | Votes | % | ±% |
|---|---|---|---|---|
| Conservative | S. Waight | 1,839 | 61.6 | –0.1 |
| Liberal Democrats | F. Hampson | 975 | 32.7 | +6.4 |
| Labour | O. Rand | 103 | 3.4 | –2.7 |
| Green | R. Allen | 69 | 2.3 | –3.6 |
| Majority | | 864 | 28.9 | –6.5 |
| Turnout | | 2,986 | 44.3 | –3.6 |
| Registered electors | | 6,731 | | |
| Conservative hold | | Swing | ▼3.3 | |

=== Heene ===
Heene
| Party | Candidate | Votes | % | ±% |
|---|---|---|---|---|
| Conservative | S. Moore* | 1,489 | 65.3 | +8.1 |
| Liberal Democrats | E. Lipscombe | 593 | 26.0 | –7.1 |
| Labour | S. Deen | 138 | 6.1 | –3.6 |
| Green | A. Morgan | 59 | 2.6 | N/A |
| Majority | | 896 | 39.3 | +15.1 |
| Turnout | | 2,279 | 33.5 | –3.4 |
| Registered electors | | 6,815 | | |
| Conservative hold | | Swing | ▲7.6 | |

=== Marine ===
Marine
| Party | Candidate | Votes | % | ±% |
|---|---|---|---|---|
| Conservative | M. Parkin* | 1,619 | 67.9 | +8.1 |
| Liberal Democrats | P. Elton | 584 | 24.5 | +1.4 |
| Labour | L. Comb | 102 | 4.3 | –3.7 |
| Green | L. Colkett | 80 | 3.4 | –4.6 |
| Majority | | 1,035 | 43.4 | +6.7 |
| Turnout | | 2,385 | 38.3 | –4.1 |
| Registered electors | | 6,244 | | |
| Conservative hold | | Swing | ▲3.4 | |

=== Offington ===
Offington
| Party | Candidate | Votes | % | ±% |
|---|---|---|---|---|
| Conservative | S. Elliott* | 1,469 | 52.2 | +2.1 |
| Liberal Democrats | E. Mardell | 1,346 | 47.8 | +2.2 |
| Majority | | 123 | 4.4 | –0.1 |
| Turnout | | 2,815 | 45.2 | –2.5 |
| Registered electors | | 6,248 | | |
| Conservative hold | | Swing | ▼0.1 | |

=== Salvington ===
Salvington
| Party | Candidate | Votes | % | ±% |
|---|---|---|---|---|
| Conservative | A. Lynn* | 1,478 | 59.3 | +0.5 |
| Liberal Democrats | V. McLuskie | 846 | 33.9 | +1.7 |
| Labour | M. Dowson | 99 | 4.0 | –5.0 |
| Green | J. Baker | 71 | 2.8 | N/A |
| Majority | | 632 | 25.3 | –1.3 |
| Turnout | | 2,494 | 38.4 | –5.5 |
| Registered electors | | 6,500 | | |
| Conservative hold | | Swing | ▼0.6 | |

=== Selden ===
Selden
| Party | Candidate | Votes | % | ±% |
|---|---|---|---|---|
| Conservative | E. Baird* | 870 | 38.1 | –0.1 |
| Liberal Democrats | I. Hart | 802 | 35.1 | +8.4 |
| Labour | J. Deen | 614 | 26.9 | –8.2 |
| Majority | | 68 | 3.0 | –0.2 |
| Turnout | | 2,286 | 36.9 | –4.6 |
| Registered electors | | 6,200 | | |
| Conservative hold | | Swing | ▼4.3 | |

=== Tarring ===
Tarring
| Party | Candidate | Votes | % | ±% |
|---|---|---|---|---|
| Liberal Democrats | E. Pitt | 1,244 | 48.0 | –6.3 |
| Conservative | T. Dice | 1,203 | 46.4 | +8.2 |
| Labour | J. West | 85 | 3.3 | –4.3 |
| Green | A. Nichols | 60 | 2.3 | N/A |
| Majority | | 41 | 1.6 | –14.5 |
| Turnout | | 2,592 | 39.9 | –4.4 |
| Registered electors | | 6,502 | | |
| Liberal Democrats gain from Conservative | | Swing | ▼7.3 | |
