= 1992 Watford Borough Council election =

Watford Borough Council election

The 1992 Watford Borough Council election took place in 1992 to elect members of Watford Borough Council in England. This was the same day as other local elections.

== Results summary ==
1992 Watford Borough Council election
Party	This election			Full council			This election		
Party	Seats	Net	Seats %	Other	Total	Total %	Votes	Votes %	+/−
Labour	7	Steady	58.3	15	22	61.1	7,641	33.0	-7.6
Conservative	4	▼1	33.3	6	10	27.8	10,231	44.2	+9.1
Liberal Democrats	1	▲1	8.3	3	4	11.1	5,123	22.1	-1.4
Green	0	Steady	0.0	0	0	0.0	146	0.6	-0.1

== Ward results ==
=== Callowland ===
Callowland
Party	Candidate	Votes	%	±%
Labour	P. Harrison	598	48.1	−10.4
Conservative	N. Bentham	477	38.4	+9.3
Liberal Democrats	E. Burtenshaw	168	13.5	+1.1
Majority			9.7	
Turnout			30.6	
Labour hold		Swing	▼9.9	

=== Central ===
Central
Party	Candidate	Votes	%	±%
Labour	V. Muspratt	752	47.2	−7.0
Conservative	F. Silva	639	40.1	+10.8
Liberal Democrats	R. Martins	203	12.7	−0.7
Majority			7.1	
Turnout			35.3	
Labour hold		Swing	▼8.9	

=== Holywell ===
Holywell
Party	Candidate	Votes	%	±%
Labour	G. Bishop	648	48.3	−9.9
Conservative	J. Pepper	492	36.7	+10.1
Liberal Democrats	J. Baddeley	201	15.0	−0.3
Majority			11.6	
Turnout			31.7	
Labour hold		Swing	▼10.0	

=== Leggats ===
Leggats
Party	Candidate	Votes	%	±%
Labour	M. Green	741	51.9	−6.6
Conservative	C. Strange	477	33.4	+7.5
Liberal Democrats	J. Waller	209	14.6	−1.0
Majority			18.5	
Turnout		1,427	34.7	
Labour hold		Swing	▼7.1	

=== Meriden ===
Meriden
Party	Candidate	Votes	%	±%
Labour	P. Woodward	910	46.2	−8.2
Conservative	P. Bell	822	41.7	+10.9
Liberal Democrats	D. Scudder	238	12.1	−2.8
Majority			4.5	
Turnout		1,970	36.5	
Labour hold		Swing	▼9.6	

=== Nascot ===
Nascot
Party	Candidate	Votes	%	±%
Conservative	J. Price	1,392	67.3	+8.4
Labour	T. Meldrum	317	15.3	+0.7
Liberal Democrats	S. Quinn	292	14.1	−7.5
Green	A. Cripps	68	3.3	−1.6
Majority			52.0	
Turnout		2,069	42.2	
Conservative hold		Swing	▲3.9	

=== Oxhey ===
Oxhey
Party	Candidate	Votes	%	±%
Liberal Democrats	D. Thornhill	1,090	44.7	−2.8
Conservative	G. Greenstreet	1,029	42.2	+9.6
Labour	E. Doveton	320	13.1	−6.9
Majority			2.5	
Turnout		2,439	51.4	
Liberal Democrats gain from Conservative		Swing	▼6.2	

=== Park ===
Park
Party	Candidate	Votes	%	±%
Conservative	P. Allan	1,333	68.0	+5.7
Liberal Democrats	P. Jenkins	356	18.2	−4.8
Labour	A. Dilley	192	9.8	−1.0
Green	I. Tottman	78	4.0	+0.1
Majority			49.9	
Turnout		1,959	47.0	
Conservative hold		Swing	▲5.3	

=== Stanborough ===
Stanborough
Party	Candidate	Votes	%	±%
Conservative	S. Jones	1,096	43.3	+15.8
Liberal Democrats	J. Richmond	1,017	40.2	−10.0
Labour	H. Magona	420	16.6	−5.7
Majority			3.1	
Turnout		2,533	50.9	
Conservative hold		Swing	▲12.9	

=== Tudor ===
Tudor
Party	Candidate	Votes	%	±%
Conservative	V. Kurland	1,163	48.7	+7.7
Labour	J. Lowe	945	39.6	−1.1
Liberal Democrats	N. Lloyd-Davies	279	11.7	−6.5
Majority			9.1	
Turnout		2,387	48.5	
Conservative hold		Swing	▲4.4	

=== Vicarage ===
Vicarage
Party	Candidate	Votes	%	±%
Labour	A. Choudhrey	917	46.5	−7.2
Conservative	E. Uphill	761	38.6	+8.7
Liberal Democrats	R. Laslett	292	14.8	−1.7
Majority			7.9	
Turnout		1,970	37.1	
Labour hold		Swing	▼8.0	

=== Woodside ===
Woodside
Party	Candidate	Votes	%	±%
Labour	M. Jackson	881	39.9	−12.1
Liberal Democrats	A. Burtenshaw	778	35.2	+15.5
Conservative	P. Jenkins	550	24.9	−3.4
Majority			4.7	
Turnout		2,209	44.4	
Labour hold		Swing	▼13.8	
