= 1992 Hertsmere Borough Council election =

1992 English local election

- 7 May 1992

15 out of 39 seats to Hertsmere Borough Council 20 seats needed for a majority
- Registered: 45,378
- Turnout: 45.1% (▲0.3%)

	First party	Second party
Party	Conservative	Labour
Seats won	12	3
Seats after	23	12
Seat change	▲1	Steady
Popular vote	11,482	4,645
Percentage	56.1%	22.7%
Swing	▲14.2%	▼16.3%
	Third party	Fourth party
Party	Liberal Democrats	Independent
Seats won	0	0
Seats after	3	1
Seat change	▼1	Steady
Popular vote	4,339	did not stand
Percentage	21.2%	did not stand
Swing	▲6.9%	▼4.8%
- Winner of each seat at the 1992 Hertsmere Borough Council election. Wards in white were not contested.
Control before election
Conservative
Control after election
Conservative

The 1992 Hertsmere Borough Council election took place on 7 May 1992 to elect members of Hertsmere Borough Council in Hertfordshire, England. This was on the same day as other local elections.

== Summary ==
=== Election result ===
1992 Hertsmere Borough Council election
Party	This election				Full council			This election		
Party	Candidates	Seats	Net	Seats %	Other	Total	Total %	Votes	Votes %	+/−
Conservative	{{{candidates}}}	12	▲1	80.0	11	23	59.0	11,482	56.1	+14.2
Labour	{{{candidates}}}	3	Steady	20.0	9	12	30.8	4,645	22.7	–16.3
Liberal Democrats	{{{candidates}}}	0	▼1	0.0	3	3	7.7	4,339	21.2	+6.9
Independent	{{{candidates}}}	0	Steady	0.0	1	1	2.6	N/A	N/A	–4.8

== Ward results ==
Incumbent councillors standing for re-election are marked with an asterisk (*). Changes in seats do not take into account by-elections or defections.

=== Aldenham West ===
Aldenham West
Party	Candidate	Votes	%	±%
Conservative	I. Southern*	699	59.1	–3.3
Labour	P. Stanley	303	25.6	–12.0
Liberal Democrats	M. Dennes	180	15.2	N/A
Majority		396	33.5	+8.7
Turnout		1,182	35.3	–8.9
Registered electors		3,356		
Conservative hold		Swing	▲4.4	

=== Cowley ===
Cowley
Party	Candidate	Votes	%	±%
Labour	P. Roach*	719	60.1	–10.0
Conservative	M. Mitchell	359	30.0	+0.1
Liberal Democrats	D. McCarthy	118	9.9	N/A
Majority		360	30.1	–10.1
Turnout		1,196	27.0	–5.0
Registered electors		4,301		
Labour hold		Swing	▼5.1	

=== Heath North ===
Heath North (2 seats due to by-election)
Party	Candidate	Votes	%	±%
Conservative	B. Batten	999	64.7	+13.5
Conservative	A. Barton	905	58.6	+7.5
Liberal Democrats	M. Silverman	326	21.1	–3.1
Liberal Democrats	B. Debnath	276	17.9	–6.3
Labour	D. Hoeksma	187	12.1	–12.4
Labour	H. Bearfield	183	11.9	–12.6
Turnout		~1,543	40.0	–5.7
Registered electors		3,858		
Conservative hold				
Conservative hold				

=== Heath South ===
Heath South
Party	Candidate	Votes	%	±%
Conservative	P. Riches*	1,076	77.4	+13.0
Liberal Democrats	P. Forsyth	186	13.4	–1.9
Labour	D. Bearfield	128	9.2	–11.1
Majority		890	64.0	+19.9
Turnout		1,390	35.0	–7.0
Registered electors		3,872		
Conservative hold		Swing	▲7.5	

=== Hillside ===
Hillside
Party	Candidate	Votes	%	±%
Labour	J. Kentish*	600	49.1	–15.7
Conservative	H. Watson	473	38.7	+3.5
Liberal Democrats	P. Hedges	149	12.2	N/A
Majority		127	10.4	–19.2
Turnout		1,222	39.0	–4.8
Registered electors		3,137		
Labour hold		Swing	▼9.6	

=== Lyndhurst ===
Lyndhurst
Party	Candidate	Votes	%	±%
Labour	E. Kelly	644	58.2	+10.5
Conservative	J. Marks	401	36.3	–4.1
Liberal Democrats	M. Barr	61	5.5	–6.4
Majority		243	22.0	+14.6
Turnout		1,106	35.6	–14.0
Registered electors		3,108		
Labour hold		Swing	▲7.3	

=== Potters Bar Central ===
Potters Bar Central
Party	Candidate	Votes	%	±%
Conservative	P. Spratt*	719	59.4	+16.1
Liberal Democrats	D. Martin	297	24.5	–1.8
Labour	B. Kerr	195	16.1	–14.2
Majority		422	34.9	+21.9
Turnout		1,211	39.7	–9.4
Registered electors		3,058		
Conservative hold		Swing	▲9.0	

=== Potters Bar East ===
Potters Bar East
Party	Candidate	Votes	%	±%
Conservative	D. Ferguson*	1,129	58.3	+12.2
Labour	P. Caylor	633	32.7	–6.4
Liberal Democrats	M. Allan	173	8.9	–5.9
Majority		496	25.6	+18.6
Turnout		1,935	42.9	–9.5
Registered electors		4,529		
Conservative hold		Swing	▲9.3	

=== Potters Bar North ===
Potters Bar North
Party	Candidate	Votes	%	±%
Conservative	J. Donne	1,004	72.1	+6.2
Liberal Democrats	J. Hurd	388	27.9	+12.4
Majority		616	44.2	–3.1
Turnout		1,392	39.6	–6.2
Registered electors		3,515		
Conservative hold		Swing	▼3.1	

=== Potters Bar South ===
Potters Bar South
Party	Candidate	Votes	%	±%
Conservative	C. Ringham	701	60.5	+16.1
Labour	P. Bradbury	366	31.6	–9.5
Liberal Democrats	P. Shannon	91	7.9	–6.6
Majority		335	28.9	+25.6
Turnout		1,158	43.1	–8.4
Registered electors		2,690		
Conservative hold		Swing	▲12.8	

=== Potters Bar West ===
Potters Bar West
Party	Candidate	Votes	%	±%
Conservative	J. Usher	774	59.5	+11.9
Liberal Democrats	C. Dean	272	20.9	–6.9
Labour	A. Bradbury	254	19.5	–5.1
Majority		502	38.6	+18.8
Turnout		1,300	37.0	–4.4
Registered electors		3,523		
Conservative hold		Swing	▲9.4	

=== St. James East ===
St. James East
Party	Candidate	Votes	%	±%
Conservative	C. Keates	602	46.0	+15.5
Liberal Democrats	L. Hodgson*	570	43.5	–1.9
Labour	P. Halsey	138	10.5	–13.6
Majority		32	2.5	N/A
Turnout		1,310	43.5	–5.7
Registered electors		3,011		
Conservative gain from Liberal Democrats		Swing	▲8.7	

=== St. James West ===
St. James West (2 seats due to by-election)
Party	Candidate	Votes	%	±%
Conservative	A. Attwood*	861	51.4	+5.9
Conservative	H. Pinkerfield	780	46.6	+1.0
Liberal Democrats	A. Ridgeley	635	37.9	+1.1
Liberal Democrats	R. Bates	617	36.8	±0.0
Labour	G. De Groot	152	9.1	–8.6
Labour	D. Lloyd-Jones	143	8.5	–9.2
Turnout		~1,676	49.0	–4.2
Registered electors		3,420		
Conservative hold				
Conservative hold				
