= 1992 St Albans City and District Council election =

St Albans City and District Council election

The 1992 St Albans City and District Council election took place on 7 May 1992 to elect members of St Albans City and District Council in England. This was on the same day as other local elections.

== Election result ==
1992 St Albans City and District Council election
Party	This election			Full council			This election		
Party	Seats	Net	Seats %	Other	Total	Total %	Votes	Votes %	+/−
Conservative	11	▼3	57.9	13	24	42.1	18,269	44.7	+7.7
Liberal Democrats	5	▲3	26.3	18	23	40.4	14,548	35.6	-0.9
Labour	3	0	15.8	6	9	15.8	7,287	17.8	-3.4
Independent	0	0	0.0	1	1	1.8	N/A	N/A	-1.0
Green	0	0	0.0	0	0	0.0	727	1.8	-2.9

== Ward results ==
=== Ashley ===
Ashley
Party	Candidate	Votes	%	±%
Liberal Democrats	V. Goodyear	878	40.3	–3.2
Conservative	J. White	674	31.0	+6.7
Labour	P. Murphy	557	25.6	–2.8
Green	E. Benjamin	67	3.1	–0.7
Majority		204	9.4	–5.7
Turnout		2,176	44.8	–6.9
Registered electors		4,867		
Liberal Democrats gain from Conservative		Swing	▼5.0	

=== Batchwood ===
Batchwood
Party	Candidate	Votes	%	±%
Labour	R. Mills*	987	46.9	–0.1
Conservative	J. Christie	642	30.5	+5.9
Liberal Democrats	G. Willey	383	18.2	–4.5
Green	S. Adamson	94	4.5	–1.2
Majority		345	16.4	–6.0
Turnout		2,106	45.1	–4.9
Registered electors		4,668		
Labour hold		Swing	▼3.0	

=== Clarence ===
Clarence
Party	Candidate	Votes	%	±%
Liberal Democrats	R. Pearman	1,078	49.5	–2.5
Conservative	G. Myland*	756	34.7	+7.4
Labour	J. Dearman	268	12.3	–3.7
Green	D. Burningham	76	3.5	–1.2
Majority		322	14.8	–9.9
Turnout		2,178	51.7	–4.1
Registered electors		4,215		
Liberal Democrats gain from Conservative		Swing	▼5.0	

=== Colney Heath ===
Colney Heath
Party	Candidate	Votes	%	±%
Liberal Democrats	P. Hughes*	790	59.1	+17.9
Conservative	D. Jeffrey	397	29.7	+0.7
Labour	C. Nash	149	11.2	–13.8
Majority		393	29.4	+17.2
Turnout		1,336	48.3	–8.0
Registered electors		2,770		
Liberal Democrats hold		Swing	▲8.6	

No Green candidate as previous (4.7%).

=== Cunningham ===
Cunningham
Party	Candidate	Votes	%	±%
Liberal Democrats	K. Clegg	1,021	40.3	–7.1
Conservative	C. Ellis*	819	32.3	+7.5
Labour	M. Pakenham	693	27.4	+2.3
Majority		202	8.0	–14.3
Turnout		2,533	52.0	–3.0
Registered electors		4,848		
Liberal Democrats gain from Conservative		Swing	▼7.3	

=== Harpenden East ===
Harpenden East
Party	Candidate	Votes	%	±%
Conservative	M. Hughes	1,204	48.4	+5.7
Liberal Democrats	D. Jeffrey	998	40.1	–3.5
Labour	D. Crew	205	8.2	–2.5
Green	J. Bishop	82	3.3	+0.3
Majority		206	8.3	N/A
Turnout		2,489	50.1	–6.9
Registered electors		5,006		
Conservative hold		Swing	▲4.6	

=== Harpenden North ===
Harpenden North
Party	Candidate	Votes	%	±%
Conservative	M. Purkiss*	1,232	51.9	+1.6
Liberal Democrats	D. Newbury-Ecob	912	38.4	+5.6
Labour	R. Botterill	230	9.7	–7.1
Majority		320	13.5	–4.0
Turnout		2,374	41.1	–2.0
Registered electors		5,795		
Conservative hold		Swing	▼2.0	

=== Harpenden South ===
Harpenden South
Party	Candidate	Votes	%	±%
Conservative	M. Morrell	1,518	66.1	+8.7
Liberal Democrats	J. Ogborn	548	23.8	–3.3
Labour	E. Gale	232	10.1	–2.5
Majority		970	42.2	+11.9
Turnout		2,298	44.8	–1.5
Registered electors		5,131		
Conservative hold		Swing	▲6.0	

No Green candidate as previous (2.9%).

=== Harpenden West ===
Harpenden West
Party	Candidate	Votes	%	±%
Conservative	W. Ponton	1,350	66.2	+8.6
Liberal Democrats	K. Sutton	522	25.6	–3.8
Labour	C. O'Brien	168	8.2	–0.5
Majority		828	40.6	+12.4
Turnout		2,040	41.2	–5.5
Registered electors		4,957		
Conservative hold		Swing	▲6.2	

=== London Colney ===
London Colney
Party	Candidate	Votes	%	±%
Labour	E. Macmillan*	1,472	67.2	+6.4
Conservative	E. Humbles	583	26.6	–3.9
Liberal Democrats	J. Hale	135	6.2	+0.7
Majority		889	40.6	+10.3
Turnout		2,190	41.1	–2.1
Registered electors		5,337		
Labour hold		Swing	▲5.2	

No Green candidate as previous (3.3%).

=== Marshallwick North ===
Marshallwick North
Party	Candidate	Votes	%	±%
Conservative	J. Foster*	1,134	49.4	+14.6
Liberal Democrats	T. Clegg	957	41.7	–11.8
Labour	A. Gilson	205	8.9	–0.1
Majority		177	7.7	N/A
Turnout		2,296	47.9	–4.6
Registered electors		4,803		
Conservative hold		Swing	▲13.2	

No Green candidate as previous (2.7%).

=== Marshallwick South ===
Marshallwick South
Party	Candidate	Votes	%	±%
Conservative	J. Turner*	1,151	43.1	+6.9
Liberal Democrats	J. Cooper	1,082	40.5	–6.6
Labour	D. Allan	298	11.2	–1.8
Green	C. Hart	138	5.2	+1.5
Majority		69	2.6	N/A
Turnout		2,669	51.2	–6.5
Registered electors		5,110		
Conservative hold		Swing	▲6.8	

=== Park Street ===
Park Street
Party	Candidate	Votes	%	±%
Conservative	N. Goulding	804	46.6	+16.3
Liberal Democrats	J. Churcher	728	42.2	–10.3
Labour	M. Yerby	193	11.2	–3.1
Majority		76	4.4	N/A
Turnout		1,725	40.2	–1.0
Registered electors		4,295		
Conservative hold		Swing	▲13.3	

=== Redbourn ===
Redbourn
Party	Candidate	Votes	%	±%
Conservative	M. Corley*	1,010	51.9	+8.5
Liberal Democrats	S. Hunt	721	37.1	–4.9
Labour	H. Gordon	167	8.6	–1.3
Green	D. Cockroft	48	2.5	–2.2
Majority		289	14.9	+13.4
Turnout		1,946	44.1	–6.7
Registered electors		4,432		
Conservative hold		Swing	▲6.7	

=== Sopwell ===
Sopwell
Party	Candidate	Votes	%	±%
Labour	N. Harris*	1,106	55.5	–5.0
Conservative	G. Brown	554	27.8	+9.8
Liberal Democrats	R. Graham	332	16.7	–0.8
Majority		1,992	27.7	–14.8
Turnout		552	41.0	–5.4
Registered electors		4,915		
Labour hold		Swing	▼7.4	

No Green candidate as previous (4.0%).

=== St. Peters ===
St. Peters
Party	Candidate	Votes	%	±%
Liberal Democrats	R. Biddle*	915	43.3	–5.3
Labour	D. Paton	593	28.1	+1.1
Conservative	D. Richards	489	23.2	+5.8
Green	C. Simmons	114	5.4	–1.6
Majority		322	15.3	–6.3
Turnout		2,111	44.4	–4.6
Registered electors		4,757		
Liberal Democrats hold		Swing	▼3.2	

=== St. Stephens ===
St. Stephens
Party	Candidate	Votes	%	±%
Conservative	B. Brockhurst*	1,472	56.6	+12.2
Liberal Democrats	J. Eagling	839	32.2	–6.5
Labour	N. Williamson	292	11.2	–2.6
Majority		633	24.3	+18.6
Turnout		2,603	45.7	–3.9
Registered electors		5,718		
Conservative hold		Swing	▲9.4	

No Green candidate as previous (3.2%).

=== Verulam ===
Verulam
Party	Candidate	Votes	%	±%
Conservative	N. Wood-Smith*	1,339	53.2	+6.0
Liberal Democrats	P. Goodall	821	32.6	–3.8
Labour	K. Sutton	248	9.9	–1.7
Green	W. Berrington	108	4.3	–0.2
Majority		518	20.6	+9.6
Turnout		2,516	49.2	–4.9
Registered electors		5,112		
Conservative hold		Swing	▲4.9	

=== Wheathampstead ===
Wheathampstead
Party	Candidate	Votes	%	±%
Conservative	K. Stammers*	1,141	50.6	+5.8
Liberal Democrats	E. Mathews	888	39.4	+10.5
Labour	C. Chadney	224	9.9	–1.1
Majority		253	11.2	–4.7
Turnout		2,253	48.0	–4.9
Registered electors		4,696		
Conservative hold		Swing	▼2.4	

No Green candidate as previous (15.3%).
