= 1992 Bedford Borough Council election =

Bedford Borough Council election

The 1992 Bedford Borough Council election took place on 7 May 1992 to elect members of Bedford Borough Council in England. This was on the same day as other local elections.

== Summary ==
=== Election result ===
1992 Bedford Borough Council election
Party	This election			Full council			This election		
Party	Seats	Net	Seats %	Other	Total	Total %	Votes	Votes %	+/−
Conservative	10	▲4	55.6	15	25	47.2	15,445	44.5	+1.6
Labour	4	▼1	22.2	11	15	28.3	9,637	27.8	–3.9
Liberal Democrats	2	▼3	11.1	8	10	18.9	8,167	23.5	–2.0
Independent	2	Steady	11.1	1	3	5.7	1,454	4.2	N/A

== Ward results ==
=== Brickhill ===
Brickhill
Party	Candidate	Votes	%	±%
Liberal Democrats	Timothy Hill*	1,534	48.2	+2.1
Conservative	Eric Threapleton	1,502	47.2	+3.8
Labour	P. Ade	144	4.5	–6.0
Majority		32	1.0	
Turnout		3,180	53.8	
Registered electors		5,857		
Liberal Democrats hold		Swing		

=== Bromham ===
Bromham
Party	Candidate	Votes	%	±%
Conservative	Graham Bates*	1,387	76.7	−1.8
Liberal Democrats	C. McCormack	292	16.1	+3.7
Labour	V. Jones	130	7.2	–1.9
Majority		1,095	60.5	
Turnout		1,809	47.3	
Registered electors		4,008		
Conservative hold		Swing		

=== Carlton ===
Carlton
Party	Candidate	Votes	%	±%
Independent	Victor Brandon*	823	83.2	–0.5
Labour	C. Falkner	87	8.8	–7.5
Liberal Democrats	J. Doran	79	8.0	N/A
Majority		736	74.4	
Turnout		989	56.9	
Registered electors		1,722		
Independent hold		Swing		

=== Castle ===
Castle
Party	Candidate	Votes	%	±%
Conservative	Robert Rigby	901	38.8	–8.0
Labour	R. Baker	849	36.5	−3.9
Liberal Democrats	P. Chiswell	573	24.7	+11.9
Majority		52	2.2	
Turnout		2,323	52.9	
Registered electors		4,477		
Conservative hold		Swing		

=== Cauldwell ===
Cauldwell
Party	Candidate	Votes	%	±%
Labour	Robert Elford*	1,201	70.2	−1.4
Conservative	Aleks Simic	342	20.0	+0.1
Liberal Democrats	G. Williams	169	9.9	+1.3
Majority		859	50.2	
Turnout		1,712	31.1	
Registered electors		5,606		
Labour hold		Swing		

=== Clapham ===
Clapham
Party	Candidate	Votes	%	±%
Independent	R. Chybalski*	584	43.5	−8.9
Conservative	J. Whatley	452	33.7	–0.2
Labour	Jennifer Lumsden	257	19.1	+5.4
Liberal Democrats	R. Prosser	50	3.7	–48.7
Majority		132	9.8	
Turnout		1,343	46.8	
Registered electors		2,790		
Independent gain from Liberal Democrats		Swing		

R. Chybalski had originally been elected as a Liberal Democrat, but defected to become an Independent prior to the election.

=== De Parys ===
De Parys
Party	Candidate	Votes	%	±%
Conservative	Roger Jones*	1,366	49.3	+6.7
Liberal Democrats	J. Crofts	1,161	41.9	+0.5
Labour	H. Newens	244	8.8	–3.6
Majority		205	7.4	
Turnout		2,771	49.0	
Registered electors		5,608		
Conservative hold		Swing		

=== Eastcotts ===
Eastcotts
Party	Candidate	Votes	%	±%
Conservative	Robert Payne	536	53.8	+17.8
Liberal Democrats	Terence Dunning*	373	37.4	–6.8
Labour	D. Tydings	88	8.8	–11.1
Majority		163	16.3	
Turnout		997	45.0	
Registered electors		2,216		
Conservative gain from Liberal Democrats		Swing		

=== Goldington ===
Goldington
Party	Candidate	Votes	%	±%
Liberal Democrats	A. Christie*	1,228	57.4	+12.0
Labour	Randolph Charles	537	25.1	–9.9
Conservative	I. Mactoom	376	17.6	−2.0
Majority		691	32.3	
Turnout		2,141	40.4	
Registered electors		5,180		
Liberal Democrats hold		Swing		

=== Harpur ===
Harpur
Party	Candidate	Votes	%	±%
Labour	Colleen Atkins*	1,133	54.7	–1.6
Conservative	S. Halse	787	38.0	+2.4
Liberal Democrats	M. Vogel	150	7.2	+2.0
Majority		346	16.7	
Turnout		2,070	36.9	
Registered electors		5,758		
Labour hold		Swing		

=== Kempston East ===
Kempston East
Party	Candidate	Votes	%	±%
Conservative	R. Szall	1,560	54.4	+8.1
Labour	David Lewis*	1,123	39.1	–10.0
Liberal Democrats	V. Hawke	187	6.5	+1.9
Majority		437	15.2	
Turnout		2,870	40.1	
Registered electors		7,190		
Conservative gain from Labour		Swing		

=== Kempston West ===
Kempston West
Party	Candidate	Votes	%	±%
Conservative	Mary Stupple*	1,346	54.3	+4.2
Labour	Sesa Lehal	948	38.3	–5.6
Liberal Democrats	B. Gibbons	137	5.5	–0.5
Independent	C. Pritchard	47	1.9	N/A
Majority		398	16.1	
Turnout		2,478	40.1	
Registered electors		6,176		
Conservative hold		Swing		

=== Kingsbrook ===
Kingsbrook
Party	Candidate	Votes	%	±%
Labour	Ian Luder*	896	56.7	+7.8
Conservative	L. Griffin	487	30.8	+17.4
Liberal Democrats	L. Ames	198	12.5	–25.2
Majority		409	25.9	–3.0
Turnout		1,581	29.9	–7.0
Registered electors		5,226		
Labour hold		Swing	▼1.5	

=== Newnham ===
Newnham
Party	Candidate	Votes	%	±%
Conservative	John Mingay	825	46.0	+9.9
Liberal Democrats	A. Lennon*	639	35.6	–5.2
Labour	Richard Crane	329	18.3	–4.8
Majority		186	10.4	N/A
Turnout		1,793	45.5	–7.3
Registered electors		4,069		
Conservative gain from Liberal Democrats		Swing	▲8.4	

=== Putnoe ===
Putnoe
Party	Candidate	Votes	%	±%
Conservative	James Moore	1,336	53.9	+7.4
Liberal Democrats	Ralph Hall	998	40.3	–6.8
Labour	G. Burchmore	144	5.8	–0.6
Majority		338	13.6	
Turnout		2,478	44.8	
Registered electors		5,521		
Conservative gain from Liberal Democrats		Swing		

=== Queens Park ===
Queens Park
Party	Candidate	Votes	%	±%
Labour	Mike Cotter*	1,056	58.5	−7.5
Conservative	R. Hughes	537	29.8	+5.6
Liberal Democrats	Judith Cunningham	212	11.7	+5.6
Majority		519	28.8	
Turnout		1,805	33.7	
Registered electors		5,533		
Labour hold		Swing		

=== Roxton ===
Roxton
Party	Candidate	Votes	%	±%
Conservative	J. Hughes*	722	82.5	+3.4
Labour	Terence Carroll	78	8.9	–4.1
Liberal Democrats	Conrad Longmore	75	8.6	+0.7
Majority		644	73.6	
Turnout		875	45.6	
Registered electors		1,907		
Conservative hold		Swing		

=== Wootton ===
Wootton
Party	Candidate	Votes	%	±%
Conservative	John Tait*	983	70.8	+21.4
Labour	G. Ware	293	21.1	–23.9
Liberal Democrats	Cheryl Green	112	8.1	+2.6
Majority		690	49.7	
Turnout		1,388	38.2	
Registered electors		3,693		
Conservative hold		Swing		
