= 1992 Broxbourne Borough Council election =

1992 UK local government election

The Broxbourne Council election, 1992 was held to elect council members of the Broxbourne Borough Council, the local government authority of the borough of Broxbourne, Hertfordshire, England.

== Composition of expiring seats before election ==
Ward	Party	Incumbent Elected	Incumbent	Standing again?
Broxbourne	Conservative	1988	Eric Martin	No
Bury Green	Conservative	1988	Hazel Jackson	Yes
Cheshunt Central	Conservative	1988	Milan Milovanovic	No
Cheshunt North	Conservative	1988	Gerald Game	Yes
Flamstead End	Conservative	1988	Edna Lazzari	Yes
Goffs Oak	Conservative	1988	Michael Janes	No
Hoddesdon North	Conservative	1988	Arthur Parkin	Yes
Hoddesdon Town	Conservative	1988	Kenneth Holliday	Yes
Rosedale	Conservative	1988	Thomas Wright	No
Rye Park	Labour	1988	Neil Harvey	No
Theobalds	Conservative	1988	Terence Askew	No
Waltham Cross North	Conservative	1988	Francis Dolan	Yes
Waltham Cross South	Labour	1988	Martin Hudson	Yes
Wormley & Turnford	Conservative	1988	John Morton	Yes

== Election results ==
Broxbourne local election result 1992
Party	Seats	Gains	Losses	Net gain/loss	Seats %	Votes %	Votes	+/−
Conservative	13	1	0	+1	92.86	64.77	12,481	
Labour	1	0	1	-1	7.14	20.34	3,918	
Liberal Democrats	0	0	0	0	0.00	14.89	2,870	

== Results summary ==
An election was held in 14 wards on 7 May 1992.

The Conservative Party gained a seat from the Labour Party in Rye Park Ward

The new political balance of the Council following this election was:

- Conservative 36 seats
- Labour 4 seats
- Liberal Democrats 2 Seats

== Ward results ==
Broxbourne Ward Result 7 May 1992
Party	Candidate	Votes	%	±%
Conservative	Peter Robinson	1,174	73.14	
Liberal Democrats	Anthony Fey	277	17.26	
Labour	Violet Monk	154	9.60	
Majority		897		
Turnout		1,605	28.88	

Bury Green Ward Result 7 May 1992
Party	Candidate	Votes	%	±%
Conservative	Hazel Jackson	1,284	68.26	
Labour	Christopher Simonovitch	423	22.49	
Liberal Democrats	Sally Diss	174	9.25	
Majority		861		
Turnout		1,881	33.37	

Cheshunt Central Ward Result 7 May 1992
Party	Candidate	Votes	%	±%
Conservative	Ray Hannam	839	73.33	
Labour	Joan Saggs	195	17.05	
Liberal Democrats	Sheila Guy	110	9.62	
Majority		644		
Turnout		1,144	31.41	

Cheshunt North Ward Result 7 May 1992
Party	Candidate	Votes	%	±%
Conservative	Gerald Game	967	68.78	
Labour	Graham Knight	286	20.34	
Liberal Democrats	Carolyn Arney	153	10.88	
Majority		681		
Turnout		1,406	26.18	

Flamstead End Ward Result 7 May 1992
Party	Candidate	Votes	%	±%
Conservative	Edna Lazzari	1,012	70.67	
Labour	Linda Dambrauskas	262	18.30	
Liberal Democrats	Andrew Wood	158	11.03	
Majority		750		
Turnout		1,432	28.94	

Goffs Oak Ward Result 7 May 1992
Party	Candidate	Votes	%	±%
Conservative	Elizabeth Clayton	903	80.48	
Liberal Democrats	Reginald Williams	128	11.41	
Labour	Stephen Ferns	91	8.11	
Majority		775		
Turnout		1,122	32.89	

Hoddesdon North Ward Result 7 May 1992
Party	Candidate	Votes	%	±%
Conservative	Arthur Parkin	1,035	65.96	
Liberal Democrats	Julia Davies	347	22.12	
Labour	Olive Foskett	187	11.92	
Majority		688		
Turnout		1,569	31.75	

Hoddesdon Town Ward Result 7 May 1992
Party	Candidate	Votes	%	±%
Conservative	Kenneth Holliday	903	54.43	
Liberal Democrats	Malcolm Aitken	531	32.01	
Labour	Robert Foskett	225	13.56	
Majority		372		
Turnout		1,659	33.36	

Rosedale Ward Result 7 May 1992
Party	Candidate	Votes	%	±%
Conservative	Neil McDonald	553	49.91	
Liberal Democrats	James Emslie	386	34.84	
Labour	Anthony Dambrauskas	169	15.25	
Majority		167		
Turnout		1,108	39.57	

Rye Park Ward Result 7 May 1992
Party	Candidate	Votes	%	±%
Conservative	Maureen Moles	833	53.95	
Labour	Derrick Shiers	489	31.67	
Liberal Democrats	Elizabeth Harrington	222	14.38	
Majority		344		
Turnout		1,544	33.73	

Theobalds Ward Result 7 May 1992
Party	Candidate	Votes	%	±%
Conservative	Barbara Bleach	837	66.12	
Labour	Julia Theobald	303	23.93	
Liberal Democrats	Alice Blanchard	126	9.95	
Majority		534		
Turnout		1,266	30.97	

Waltham Cross North Ward Result 7 May 1992
Party	Candidate	Votes	%	±%
Conservative	Francis Dolan	754	71.33	
Labour	Malcolm Theobald	227	21.48	
Liberal Democrats	Anthony Stokes	76	7.19	
Majority		527		
Turnout		1,057	35.30	

Waltham Cross South Ward Result 7 May 1992
Party	Candidate	Votes	%	±%
Labour	Martin Hudson	684	48.75	
Conservative	Martin Brown	649	46.26	
Liberal Democrats	Patricia Waughray	70	4.99	
Majority		35		
Turnout		1,403	33.75	

Wormley / Turnford Ward Result 7 May 1992
Party	Candidate	Votes	%	±%
Conservative	John Morton	738	68.78	
Labour	Carol Turner	223	20.78	
Liberal Democrats	Nicholas Johnson	112	10.44	
Majority		515		
Turnout		1,073	23.37	
