= 1992 Banff and Buchan District Council election =

1992 Scottish local government election

- 7 May 1992

All 18 seats to Banff and Buchan District Council 10 seats needed for a majority
	First party	Second party	Third party
Party	Independent	SNP	Liberal Democrats
Last election	10 seats, 44.5%	8 seats, 46.7%	0 seats, 2.3%
Seats won	10	7	1
Seat change	Steady	▼1	▲1
Popular vote	10,903	9,263	1,493
Percentage	50.1%	42.6%	6.9%
Swing	▲5.6%	▼4.1%	▲4.6%
- Map of ward results

- Council composition following the election

Elections to Banff and Buchan District Council were held on 7 May 1992, on the same day as the other Scottish local government elections. This was the sixth and final election to the district council following the implementation of the Local Government (Scotland) Act 1973.

The election used the 18 wards created by the Initial Statutory Reviews of Electoral Arrangements in 1980. Each ward elected one councillor using first-past-the-post voting.

== Results ==
1992 Banff and Buchan District Council election result
Party	Seats	Gains	Losses	Net gain/loss	Seats %	Votes %	Votes	+/−
Independent	10	1	1	Steady	55.6	50.1	10,903	▲5.6
SNP	7	1	2	▼1	38.9	42.6	9,263	▼4.1
Liberal Democrats	1	1	0	▲1	5.6	6.9	1,493	▲4.6
Labour	0	0	0	Steady	0.0	0.6	123	▼5.1
