= 1992 Tweeddale District Council election =

1992 election in Scotland

← 1988	7 May 1992

All 10 seats to Tweeddale District Council 6 seats needed for a majority
	First party	Second party
Party	Independent	Liberal Democrats
Last election	7 seats, 56.4%	Did not contest
Seats won	6	2
Seat change	▼1	▲2
Popular vote	2,888	448
Percentage	53.0%	8.3%
Swing	▼3.4%	New
	Third party	Fourth party
Party	SNP	Labour
Last election	1 seat, 20.4%	1 seat, 16.9%
Seats won	1	1
Seat change	Steady	Steady
Popular vote	1,428	517
Percentage	26.2%	9.5%
Swing	▲5.8%	▼7.4%
- Composition of District Council after the election

Elections to Tweeddale District Council took place on 7 May 1992, alongside elections to the councils of Scotland's various other districts.

== Results ==
1992 Tweeddale District Council election result
Party	Seats	Gains	Losses	Net gain/loss	Seats %	Votes %	Votes	+/−
Independent	6			▼1	60.0	53.0	2,888	▼3.4
Liberal Democrats	2			▲2	20.0	8.3	448	New
SNP	1			Steady	10.0	26.2	1,428	▲5.8
Labour	1			Steady	10.0	9.5	517	▼7.4
Conservative	0	0	1	▼1	0.0	3.2	170	▼3.1
