= 1992 Gloucester City Council election =

UK local election

The 1992 Gloucester City Council election took place on 5 May 1992 to elect members of Gloucester City Council in England. It was still a no overall control council.

== Results ==
Gloucester City Council election, 1992
Party	Seats	Gains	Losses	Net gain/loss	Seats %	Votes %	Votes	+/−
Conservative	13					37.1		
Labour	16					45.7		
Liberal Democrats	6					14.3		
Other	1					2.9		

== Ward results ==
=== Barnwood ===
Barnwood 1992
Party	Candidate	Votes	%	±%
Conservative	A. Gravells	2,153	55.8	
Labour	S. McHale	1,350	35.0	
Liberal Democrats	W. Crowther	358	9.3	
Turnout		3,861	36.9	
Conservative hold		Swing		

=== Barton ===
Barton 1992
Party	Candidate	Votes	%	±%
Labour	E. Garwood	891	61.4	
Conservative	L. Proctor	449	31.0	
Liberal Democrats	Ms. V. Ellis	110	7.6	
Turnout		1,450	27.4	
Labour hold		Swing		

=== Eastgate ===
Eastgate 1992
Party	Candidate	Votes	%	±%
Conservative	G. Colley	832	43.3	
Labour	M.Patel	830	43.2	
Liberal Democrats	L. Holman	261	13.6	
Turnout		1,923	32.5	
Conservative gain from Labour		Swing		

=== Hucclecote ===
Hucclecote 1992
Party	Candidate	Votes	%	±%
Conservative	C.* Pullon	1,867	56.0	
Liberal Democrats	G. Phillips	953	28.6	
Labour	R. Mills	516	15.5	
Turnout		3,336	43.2	
Conservative hold		Swing		

=== Kingsholm ===
Kingsholm 1992
Party	Candidate	Votes	%	±%
Liberal Democrats	Ms.* M. Gould	1,558	50.1	
Conservative	P. Awford	1,242	39.9	
Labour	D. Hitchings	310	10.0	
Turnout		3,111	45.6	
Liberal Democrats gain from Conservative		Swing		

=== Linden ===
Linden 1992
Party	Candidate	Votes	%	±%
Labour	A. McInnes-Gibbons	1,052	49.8	
Conservative	D. Brown	878	41.6	
Liberal Democrats	Ms. Caldwell B.	181	8.6	
Turnout		2,111	38.6	
Labour hold		Swing		

=== Longlevens ===
Longlevens 1992
Party	Candidate	Votes	%	±%
Conservative	J.* Neary	1,671	53.3	
Labour	Pyle D.	1,074	34.3	
Liberal Democrats	J. Goodwin	390	12.4	
Turnout		3,175	46.3	
Conservative hold		Swing		

=== Matson ===
Matson 1992
Party	Candidate	Votes	%	±%
Labour	J.* Holmes	955	53.9	
Conservative	M. Greenhalgh	677	38.2	
Liberal Democrats	Ms. A. Gribble	140	7.9	
Turnout		1,772	30.0	
Labour hold		Swing		

=== Podsmead ===
Podsmead 1992
Party	Candidate	Votes	%	±%
Conservative	Ms. E. Orr	907	38.3	
Labour	G. Jackson	737	31.1	
Liberal Democrats	Ms. A. Evans	726	30.6	
Turnout		2,380	40.3	
Conservative gain from Labour		Swing		

=== Tuffley ===
Tuffley 1992
Party	Candidate	Votes	%	±%
Conservative	C. Hart	1,285	47.4	
Labour	A.* Meredith	1,280	47.2	
Liberal Democrats	A. Gribble	146	5.4	
Turnout		3,291	45.0	
Conservative gain from Labour		Swing		

=== Westgate ===
Westgate 1992
Party	Candidate	Votes	%	±%
Conservative	Ms. P. Tracey	932	45.4	
Liberal Democrats	J.* Absalom	807	39.3	
Labour	Ms. G. Gillespie	312	15.2	
Turnout		2,051	37.9	
Conservative gain from Liberal Democrats		Swing		
