= 1992 Clydebank District Council election =

1992 Scottish local government election

The 1992 Clydebank District Council election took place on 7 May 1992, alongside elections to the councils of Scotland's various other districts.

The result of the election

== Results ==
1992 Clydebank District Council election result
Party	Seats	Gains	Losses	Net gain/loss	Seats %	Votes %	Votes	+/−
Labour	8			▼3	66.7	45.8		▼11.4
SNP	2			▲2	16.7	33.7		▲1.7
Conservative	1			Steady	8.3	13.3		▲7.4
Independent	1			▲1	8.3	7.4		▲4.6
