= 1992 Falkirk District Council election =

District election in Scotland

| ← 1988 | 7 May 1992 | 1995 (As Falkirk Council) → |

All 36 seats to Falkirk District Council 19 seats needed for a majority
| | First party | Second party |
|---|---|---|
| Party | Labour | SNP |
| Last election | 20 seats, 48.8% | 10 seats, 35.2% |
| Seats won | 16 | 14 |
| Seat change | ▼4 | ▲4 |
| Popular vote | 19,996 | 18,209 |
| Percentage | 43.1% | 39.3% |
| Swing | ▼5.7% | ▲4.1% |
| | Third party | Fourth party |
| Party | Conservative | Independent |
| Last election | 3 seats, 8.2% | 2 seats, 4.4% |
| Seats won | 3 | 3 |
| Seat change | Steady | ▲1 |
| Popular vote | 4,498 | 2,890 |
| Percentage | 9.7% | 6.3% |
| Swing | ▲1.5% | ▲1.9% |
- Composition of District Council after the election

Elections to the Falkirk District Council took place on 7 May 1992, alongside elections to the councils of Scotland's various other districts.

== Results ==
1992 Falkirk District Council election result
| Party | Seats | Gains | Losses | Net gain/loss | Seats % | Votes % | Votes | +/− |
|---|---|---|---|---|---|---|---|---|
| Labour | 16 | 1 | 5 | ▼4 | 44.4 | 43.1 | 19,996 | ▼5.7 |
| SNP | 14 | 4 | 0 | ▲4 | 38.9 | 39.3 | 18,209 | ▲4.1 |
| Conservative | 3 | 0 | 0 | Steady | 8.3 | 9.7 | 4,498 | ▲1.5 |
| Independent | 3 | 1 | 0 | ▲1 | 8.3 | 6.3 | 2,890 | ▲1.9 |
| Liberal Democrats | 0 | 0 | 0 | Steady | 0.0 | 1.8 | 807 | New |
