= 1992 Bearsden and Milngavie District Council election =

1992 Scottish local government election

Elections to Bearsden and Milngavie Council were held in May 1992, the same day as the other Scottish local government elections. The election was the last for the Bearsden and Milngavie District Council, as the council would be combined into the East Dunbartonshire unitary authority for the 1995 election.

The result of the election

== Election results ==
Bearsden and Milngavie local election result 1992
| Party | Seats | Gains | Losses | Net gain/loss | Seats % | Votes % | Votes | +/− |
|---|---|---|---|---|---|---|---|---|
| Conservative | 5 | | | | 50.0 | 48.0 | 7,999 | |
| Liberal Democrats | 4 | | | | 40.0 | 33.1 | 5,516 | |
| Labour | 1 | | | | 10.0 | 10.5 | 1,744 | |
| SNP | 0 | | | | 0.0 | 8.7 | 1,436 | |
