= 1992 Renfrew District Council election =

1992 Scottish local government election

Elections to the Renfrew District Council took place in May 1992, alongside elections to the councils of Scotland's various other districts.

The result of the election

== Aggregate results ==
Renfrew District Election Result 1992
Party	Seats	Gains	Losses	Net gain/loss	Seats %	Votes %	Votes	+/−
Labour	23					39.3	23,275	
SNP	12					33.8	19,982	
Conservative	8					22.0	13,033	
Liberal Democrats	2					4.3	2,528	
Independent	0				0.0	0.6	303	
Green	0				0.0	0.2	92	
Other Parties	0				0.0	0.1	40	
