= 1992 Kyle and Carrick District Council election =

1992 Scottish local government election

The 1992 Kyle and Carrick District Council election took place on 7 May 1992, alongside elections to the councils of Scotland's various other districts.

The result of the election

== Results ==
1992 Kyle and Carrick District Council election result
Party	Seats	Gains	Losses	Net gain/loss	Seats %	Votes %	Votes	+/−
Conservative	16	9	0	▲9	64.0	47.7	20,326	▲13.9
Labour	9	1	8	▼7	36.0	38.8	16,538	▼6.4
SNP	0	0	0	Steady	0.0	8.4	3,570	▼1.5
Liberal Democrats	0	0	0	Steady	0.0	4.0	1,690	▼1.7
Independent Labour	0	0	1	▼1	0.0	0.6	261	▼0.4
Independent	0	0	0	Steady	0.0	0.5	186	▲0.2
Ind. Conservative	0	0	1	▼1	0.0	0.3	125	▼5.4
