= 1992 Clydesdale District Council election =

1992 Scottish local government election

The 1992 Clydesdale District Council election took place on 7 May 1992, alongside elections to the councils of Scotland's various other districts.

The result of the election

== Results ==
1992 Clydesdale District Council election
Party	Seats	Gains	Losses	Net gain/loss	Seats %	Votes %	Votes	+/−
Labour	7			▼2	43.8	42.7		
SNP	4			Steady	25.0	33.7		
Conservative	3			▲2	18.8	19.0		
Independent	2			Steady	12.5	5.5		
