= 1992 Sutherland District Council election =

6th election to Sutherland District Council

- 7 May 1992

All 14 seats to Sutherland District Council 8 seats needed for a majority
	First party
Party	Independent
Seats won	14
Seat change	0
Popular vote	2,356
Percentage	100.0%
Swing	▲8.7%
Council Convener before election
Independent
Council Convener after election
Alison Magee
Independent

The result of the election

Elections to the Sutherland District Council took place on 7 May 1992, alongside elections to the councils of Scotland's various other districts. Independents remained in control of the council, winning all 14 seats. Eight candidates were elected unopposed, and Voter turnout in the contested wards was 38.9%.

== Aggregate results ==
1992 Sutherland District Council election result
Party	Seats	Gains	Losses	Net gain/loss	Seats %	Votes %	Votes	+/−
Independent	14	0	0	0	100.0	100.0	2,356	▲8.7

== Ward results ==
1992 Sutherland District Council election result
Ward		Councillor	Result
1	Dornoch Burgh	J. D. W. Allan	Independent hold
2	Dornoch Rural	S. M. Board	Independent hold
3	Creich	R. E. Taylor	Independent hold
4	Kincardine	G. W. Holden	Independent hold
5	Golspie Rural	H. M. Houston	Independent hold
6	Golspie	D. I. MacRae	Independent hold
7	Lairg	A. L. Magee	Independent hold
8	Assynt	J. M. Buchanan	Independent hold
9	Eddrachillies/Durness	L. MacKenzie	Independent hold
10	Brora	M. Fielding	Independent hold
11	Brora/Loth	R. R. McDonald	Independent hold
12	Helmsdale	J. O. F. Mackay	Independent hold
13	Tongue	A. Mackay	Independent hold
14	Strathy	E. B. Jardine	Independent hold
