= 1992 Eastwood District Council election =

1992 Scottish local government election

Results by ward.

The 1992 Eastwood District Council election for the Eastwood District Council took place in May 1992, alongside elections to the councils of Scotland's various other districts.

The Conservatives again maintained their dominance of the council, winning 56% of the vote and two-thirds of the Districts' seats.

== Aggregate results ==
The result of the election

Eastwood District Council election, 1992
Party	Seats	Gains	Losses	Net gain/loss	Seats %	Votes %	Votes	+/−
Conservative	8					55.7	8,518	
Residents	2					9.0	1,367	
Liberal Democrats	1					15.0	2,285	
Labour	1					11.1	1,692	
SNP	0	0			0.0	9.1	1,385	
Independent	0	0			0.0	0.5	72	
