= 1992 Kirkcaldy District Council election =

1992 Scottish local government election

Elections to the Kirkcaldy District Council took place in May 1992, alongside elections to the councils of Scotland's various other districts.

The result of the election

== Aggregate results ==
Kirkcaldy District Election Result 1992
Party	Seats	Gains	Losses	Net gain/loss	Seats %	Votes %	Votes	+/−
Labour	26					49.4	18,924	
SNP	7					27.1	10,353	
Independent	3					7.0	2,648	
Conservative	2					9.5	3,633	
Liberal Democrats	2					6.7	2,533	
Other Parties	0				0.0	0.7	245	
