= 1992 Lochaber District Council election =

1992 Scottish local government election

← 1988	7 May 1992	1995 →

All 15 seats to Lochaber District Council 8 seats needed for a majority

	First party	Second party	Third party
Party	Independent	Labour	SNP
Seats won	8	3	3
Seat change	0	▼1	▲3
Popular vote	1,261	1,480	1,431
Percentage	26.3%	30.7%	29.7%
Swing	▼14.1%	▼4.3%	New
	Fourth party
Party	Independent Labour
Seats won	1
Seat change	▼2
Popular vote	654
Percentage	13.6%
Swing	▼5.8%
Council Control before election
Independent
Council Control after election
Independent

Elections to the Lochaber District Council took place in May 1992, alongside elections to the councils of Scotland's various other districts.

The result of the election

== Aggregate results ==
Lochaber District Election Result 1992
Party	Seats	Gains	Losses	Net gain/loss	Seats %	Votes %	Votes	+/−
Independent	8			0		26.3	1,261	
Labour	3			▼1		30.7	1,480	
SNP	3			▲3		29.7	1,431	
Independent Labour	1			▼2		13.6	654	
