= 1992 Inverness District Council election =

1992 Scottish local government election

← 1988	7 May 1992	1995 →

All 28 seats to Inverness District Council 15 seats needed for a majority

	First party	Second party	Third party
Party	Independent	Labour	Liberal Democrats
Seats won	13	8	5
Seat change	▼1	▼4	▲3
Popular vote	4,971	2,049	2,458
Percentage	41.6%	17.2%	20.6%
Swing	▼9.5%	▼13.5%	▲12.9%
	Fourth party	Fifth party
Party	SNP	Liberal
Seats won	1	1
Seat change	▲1	▲1
Popular vote	1,385	587
Percentage	11.6%	4.9%
Swing	▲3.9%	New
Council Control before election
Independent
Council Control after election
Independent

Elections to the Inverness District Council took place in May 1992, alongside elections to the councils of Scotland's various other districts.

== Aggregate results ==
Inverness District Election Result 1992
Party	Seats	Gains	Losses	Net gain/loss	Seats %	Votes %	Votes	+/−
Independent	13			▼1		41.6	4,971	▼9.5
Labour	8			▼4		17.2	2,049	▼13.5
Liberal Democrats	5			▲3		20.6	2,458	▲12.9
SNP	1			▲1		11.6	1,385	▲3.9
Liberal	1			▲1		4.9	587	New
Green	0			0	0.0	3.1	359	▲0.3
Socialist (GB)	0			0	0.0	1.3	153	New
