= 1992 Stewartry District Council election =

1992 Scottish local government election

The 1992 Stewartry District Council election took place on 7 May 1992, alongside elections to the councils of Scotland's various other districts.

The result of the election

== Results ==
1992 Stewartry District Council election result
| Party | Seats | Gains | Losses | Net gain/loss | Seats % | Votes % | Votes | +/− |
|---|---|---|---|---|---|---|---|---|
| Independent | 11 | | | | | 72.4 | 3,307 | |
| Conservative | 1 | | | | | 24.4 | 1,111 | |
| Independent Nationalist | 0 | 0 | | | | 3.4 | 151 | |
