= 1992 Perth and Kinross District Council election =

1992 Scottish local government election

The 1992 Perth and Kinross District Council election took place on the 7 May 1992 to elect members of Perth and Kinross District Council, as part of that year's Scottish local elections.

The result of the election

== Results ==
1992 Perth and Kinross District Council election
Party	Seats	Gains	Losses	Net gain/loss	Seats %	Votes %	Votes	+/−
Conservative	16			▲4	55.2	38.8		▼1.2
SNP	5			▼3	17.2	32.8		▲1.9
Labour	3			▼2	10.3	8.9		▼4.9
Independent	3			▲1	10.3	8.3		▲3.3
Liberal Democrats	2			Steady	6.9	11.4		▲2.2
