= 1992 Motherwell District Council election =

1992 elections to the Motherwell District Council

Elections to the Motherwell District Council took place in May 1992, alongside elections to the councils of Scotland's various other districts.

The result of the election

== Aggregate results ==
Motherwell District Election Result 1992
Party	Seats	Gains	Losses	Net gain/loss	Seats %	Votes %	Votes	+/−
Labour	22					53.1	25,063	
SNP	4					24.5	11,570	
Conservative	2					12.8	6,013	
Independent	1					5.9	2,757	
Other Parties	1					3.6	1,682	
Liberal Democrats	0				0.0	0.4	158	
