= 1992 Clackmannan District Council election =

1992 Scottish local government election

The result of the election

The Clackmannan District Council election was held on 7 May 1992, alongside elections to the councils of Scotland's various other districts.

== Results ==
1992 Clackmannan District Council election result
Party	Seats	Gains	Losses	Net gain/loss	Seats %	Votes %	Votes	+/−
Labour	8					41.2	6,957	
SNP	3					38.4	6,147	
Conservative	1					18.2	2,917	
Liberal Democrats	0				0.0	2.4	380	
