= 1992 Ross and Cromarty District Council election =

1992 Scottish local government election

- 7 May 1992

All 22 seats to Ross and Cromarty District Council 12 seats needed for a majority

	First party	Second party	Third party
Party	Independent	SNP	Conservative
Seats won	16	4	1
Seat change	▼2	▲3	Steady
Popular vote	3,654	1,967	474
Percentage	56.4%	30.4%	7.4%
Swing	▼11.3%	▲11.8%	▲7.4%
	Fourth party
Party	Labour
Seats won	1
Seat change	▼1
Popular vote	0
Percentage	0.0%
Swing	▼7.9%
Council Control before election
Independent
Council Control after election
Independent

Elections to the Ross and Cromarty District Council took place in May 1992, alongside elections to the councils of Scotland's various other districts.

The result of the election

== Aggregate results ==
Ross and Cromarty District Election Result 1992
Party	Seats	Gains	Losses	Net gain/loss	Seats %	Votes %	Votes	+/−
Independent	16			▼2		56.4	3,654	▼11.3
SNP	4			▲3		30.4	1,967	▲11.8
Conservative	1			Steady		7.4	474	▲7.4
Labour	1			▼1		0.0	0	▼7.9
Green	0			Steady	0.0	5.8	370	▲1.4
Communist (Scotland)	0			Steady	0.0	0.3	15	New

The Labour candidate was elected unopposed
