= 1992 Moray District Council election =

1992 Scottish local government election

- 7 May 1992

All 18 seats to Moray District Council 10 seats needed for a majority
	First party	Second party
Party	Independent	SNP
Last election	9 seats, 36.8%	7 seats, 45.4%
Seats won	9	7
Seat change	Steady	Steady
Popular vote	8,853	11,454
Percentage	35.7%	46.1%
Swing	▼1.1%	▲0.7%
	Third party	Fourth party
Party	Conservative	Labour
Last election	0 seats, 8.0%	2 seats, 8.4%
Seats won	1	1
Seat change	▲1	▼1
Popular vote	2,508	1,004
Percentage	10.1%	4.1%
Swing	▲2.1%	▼4.3%
- Map of ward results

- Council composition following the election

Elections to Moray District Council were held on 7 May 1992, on the same day as the other Scottish local government elections. This was the sixth and final election to the district council following the implementation of the Local Government (Scotland) Act 1973.

The election used the 18 wards created by the Initial Statutory Reviews of Electoral Arrangements in 1980. Each ward elected one councillor using first-past-the-post voting.

== Background ==
As in this election to Moray District Council, the Independent group at the 1988 election also took 9 seats, with the SNP a close second at 7. Labour held the remaining 2 seats.

1988 Moray District Council election results
Party	Seats	Vote share
Independent	9	36.8%
SNP	7	45.4%
Labour	2	8.4%

== Results ==
1992 Moray District Council election result
Party	Seats	Gains	Losses	Net gain/loss	Seats %	Votes %	Votes	+/−
Independent	9	2	2	Steady	50.0	35.7	8,853	▼1.1
SNP	7	2	2	Steady	38.9	46.1	11,454	▲0.7
Conservative	1	1	0	▲1	5.6	10.1	2,508	▲2.1
Labour	1	0	1	▼1	5.6	4.1	1,004	▼4.3
Liberal Democrats	0	0	0	Steady	0.0	4.2	1,031	▲2.8

== Ward results ==
=== Bishopmill ===
Party	Candidate	Votes	%
Independent	G MacKenzie	632	54.1
SNP	R Pattie	532	45.5
Majority		100	8.6
Turnout		1,168	32.1
Independent gain from Labour			

=== Cathedral ===
Party	Candidate	Votes	%
Labour	A Farqhuarson (Incumbent)	583	44.2
SNP	E Hardie	385	29.2
Conservative	G Rogers	349	26.4
Majority		198	15.0
Turnout		1,320	34.6
Labour hold			

=== New Elgin ===
Party	Candidate	Votes	%
SNP	M Anderson	439	41.5
Conservative	D McGettrick	318	30.0
Labour	A Wood	251	23.7
Liberal Democrats	J Johnstone	50	4.7
Majority		121	11.5
Turnout		1,059	30.8
SNP gain from Independent			

=== Central West ===
Party	Candidate	Votes	%
Independent	J Proctor (Incumbent)	866	55.4
SNP	R Burns	448	28.7
Labour	L Easton	170	10.9
Liberal Democrats	W Nelson	75	4.8
Majority		418	26.7
Turnout		1,559	39.7
Independent hold			

=== Forres ===
Party	Candidate	Votes	%
SNP	H Cumiskie (Incumbent)	898	54.5
Independent	C White	624	37.9
Liberal Democrats	M McLintock	124	7.5
Majority		274	16.6
Turnout		1,647	36.5
SNP hold			

=== Findhorn Valley ===
Party	Candidate	Votes	%
Independent	W Swanson	840	55.3
SNP	R Laing (Incumbent)	732	46.4
Majority		108	6.9
Turnout		1,577	33.2
Independent gain from SNP			

=== Laich ===
Party	Candidate	Votes	%
Conservative	D Thompson	875	57.2
SNP	C Scaife (Incumbent)	650	42.5
Majority		225	14.7
Turnout		1,531	37.6
Conservative gain from SNP			

=== Lossiemouth ===
Party	Candidate	Votes	%
SNP	A Fleming	1,151	65.2
Conservative	R Conway	521	29.5
Liberal Democrats	A Blumner	88	5.0
Majority		630	35.7
Turnout		1,765	43.0
SNP hold			

=== Heldon ===
Party	Candidate	Votes	%
Independent	I Lawson (Incumbent)	615	62.3
SNP	S Ewing	297	30.1
Liberal Democrats	E Nelson	73	7.4
Majority		318	32.2
Turnout		987	36.2
Independent hold			

=== Innes ===
Party	Candidate	Votes	%
Independent	J Shaw (Incumbent)	977	66.3
SNP	I Taylor	492	33.4
Majority		485	32.9
Turnout		1,473	37.4
Independent hold			

=== Buckie West ===
Party	Candidate	Votes	%
SNP	W Jappy (Incumbent)	975	70.2
Independent	E Scott	409	29.4
Majority		566	40.8
Turnout		1,389	42.1
SNP hold			

=== Buckie East ===
Party	Candidate	Votes	%
SNP	S Longmore	930	77.4
Independent	H Watt	270	22.5
Majority		660	54.9
Turnout		1,202	37.9
SNP hold			

=== Rathford ===
Party	Candidate	Votes	%
Independent	J Wilson	784	57.4
SNP	M Marshall	580	42.5
Majority		204	14.9
Turnout		1,366	39.8
Independent hold			

=== Lennox ===
Party	Candidate	Votes	%
SNP	T Howe (Incumbent)	802	56.2
Liberal Democrats	D Cameron	621	43.5
Majority		181	12.7
Turnout		1,427	47.6
SNP hold			

=== Keith ===
Party	Candidate	Votes	%
Independent	L Mann (Incumbent)	1,132	66.4
SNP	M Barr	572	33.5
Majority		560	32.9
Turnout		1,706	49.1
Independent hold			

=== Strathisla ===
Party	Candidate	Votes	%
Independent	M Davidson	537	56.1
SNP	D Barr	421	43.9
Majority		116	12.2
Turnout		958	37.1
Independent hold			

=== Speyside ===
Party	Candidate	Votes	%
Independent	E Aldridge (Incumbent)	1,167	71.3
SNP	G Scott	467	28.5
Majority		700	42.8
Turnout		1,636	49.4
Independent hold			

=== Glenlivet ===
Party	Candidate	Votes	%
SNP	A Scott	683	60.5
Conservative	A Dean	445	39.4
Majority		238	21.1
Turnout		1,129	41.1
SNP gain from Independent			
