= 1992 Ettrick and Lauderdale District Council election =

1992 Scottish local government election

The result of the election

Elections to the Ettrick and Lauderdale District Council took place in May 1992, alongside elections to the councils of Scotland's various other districts.

== Aggregate results ==
Ettrick and Lauderdale District Election Result 1992
Party	Seats	Gains	Losses	Net gain/loss	Seats %	Votes %	Votes	+/−
Independent	15					66.7	3,714	
SNP	1					18.2	1,010	
Labour	0	0			0.0	7.7	427	
Conservative	0	0			0.0	7.6	420	
