= 1992 Roxburgh District Council election =

District council Election in Roxburgh during May 1992

- 7 May 1992

All 16 seats to Roxburgh District Council 9 seats needed for a majority
	First party	Second party	Third party
Party	Independent	Liberal Democrats	Conservative
Last election	11 seats, 53.3%	1 seat, 3.7%	1 seats, 23.4%
Seats won	8	5	1
Seat change	▼3	▲4	Steady
Popular vote	2,951	1,432	1,379
Percentage	42.3%	20.6%	19.8%
Swing	▼11.0%	▲16.9%	▼3.6%
	Fourth party	Fifth party
Party	SNP	Moderates
Last election	2 seats, 15.9%	1 seat, 3.7%
Seats won	1	1
Seat change	▼1	Steady
Popular vote	841	354
Percentage	12.1%	5.1%
Swing	▼3.8%	▲1.4%

Elections to the Roxburgh District Council took place on 7 May 1992, alongside elections to the councils of Scotland's various other districts.

== Results ==
1992 Roxburgh District Council election result
Party	Seats	Gains	Losses	Net gain/loss	Seats %	Votes %	Votes	+/−
Independent	8			▼3	50.0	42.3	2,951	▼11.0
Liberal Democrats	5			▲4	31.3	20.6	1,432	▲16.9
Conservative	1			Steady	6.3	19.8	1,379	▼3.6
SNP	1			▼1	6.3	12.1	841	▼3.8
Moderates	1			Steady	6.3	5.1	354	▲1.4
