= 1992 Dunfermline District Council election =

1992 Scottish local government election

Elections to the Dunfermline District Council took place in May 1992, alongside elections to the councils of Scotland's various other districts.

The result of the election

== Aggregate results ==
Dunfermline District Election Result 1992
Party	Seats	Gains	Losses	Net gain/loss	Seats %	Votes %	Votes	+/−
Labour	22					41.5	12,785	
SNP	5					28.7	8,827	
Liberal Democrats	4					13.6	4,161	
Conservative	2					12.5	3,825	
Other Parties	0				0.0	2.4	730	
Independent	0				0.0	1.6	487	
