= 1992 Inverclyde District Council election =

1992 Scottish local government election

← 1988	7 May 1992	1995 (As Inverclyde Council) →

All 20 Seats to Inverclyde District District Council 11 seats needed for a majority
	First party	Second party	Third party
Party	Labour	Liberal Democrats	Conservative
Last election	12 seats, 45.4%	7 seats, 35.3%	1 seats, 6.8%
Seats won	11	8	1
Seat change	▼1	▲1	Steady
Popular vote	10,773	10,403	2,703
Percentage	37.6%	36.3%	9.5%
Swing	▼7.8%	▲1.0%	▲2.7%
- Composition of District Council after the election

Elections to the Inverclyde District Council took place on 7 May 1992, alongside elections to the councils of Scotland's various other districts.

== Results ==
1992 Inverclyde District Council election result
Party	Seats	Gains	Losses	Net gain/loss	Seats %	Votes %	Votes	+/−
Labour	11			▼1	55.0	37.6	10,773	▼7.8
Liberal Democrats	8			▲1	40.0	36.3	10,403	▲1.0
Conservative	1			Steady	5.0	9.5	2,703	▲2.7
SNP	0	0	0	Steady	0.0	16.8	4,792	▲4.4
