= 1992 Nairn District Council election =

1992 Scottish local government election

- 7 May 1992

All 10 seats to Nairn District Council 6 seats needed for a majority

	First party	Second party	Third party
Party	Independent	Conservative	Labour
Seats won	8	1	1
Seat change	▼1	0	▲1
Popular vote	1,146	0	0
Percentage	100.0%	0.0%	0.0%
Swing	▲12.6%	▼12.7%	New
Council Control before election
Independent
Council Control after election
Independent

Elections to the Nairn District Council took place in May 1992, alongside elections to the councils of Scotland's various other districts.

== Aggregate results ==
The result of the election

Nairn District Election Result 1992
Party	Seats	Gains	Losses	Net gain/loss	Seats %	Votes %	Votes	+/−
Independent	8			▼1	80.0	100.0	1,146	▲12.6
Conservative	1			0	10.0	0.0	0	▼12.7
Labour	1			▲1	10.0	0.0	0	New

The Labour and Conservative candidates were elected unopposed
