= 1992 Berwickshire District Council election =

1992 Scottish local government election

Elections to Berwickshire District Council were held in May 1992, the same day as the other Scottish local government elections. The election was the last for the Berwickshire District Council, as the council would be replaced with the Scottish Borders unitary authority for the 1995 election.

The result of the election

== Election results ==
Berwickshire District Council Election Result 1992
Party	Seats	Gains	Losses	Net gain/loss	Seats %	Votes %	Votes	+/−
Conservative	8					46.0	621	
Independent	3					54.0	729	
Liberal Democrats	1					0.0	0	
