= 1992 Strathkelvin District Council election =

1992 Scottish local government election

The 1992 Strathkelvin District Council election took place on 7 May 1992, alongside elections to the councils of Scotland's various other districts.

The result of the election

== Results ==
1992 Strathkelvin District Council election result
| Party | Seats | Gains | Losses | Net gain/loss | Seats % | Votes % | Votes | +/− |
|---|---|---|---|---|---|---|---|---|
| Labour | 9 | 0 | 3 | ▼3 | 60.0 | 44.7 | 12,524 | |
| Conservative | 6 | 4 | 0 | ▲4 | 40.0 | 29.1 | 8,158 | |
| SNP | 0 | 0 | 0 | Steady | 0.0 | 19.5 | 5,460 | |
| Liberal Democrats | 0 | 0 | 1 | ▼1 | 0.0 | 6.9 | 1,931 | |
