= 1992 West Lothian District Council election =

1992 Scottish local government election

- 7 May 1992

All 24 seats to West Lothian Council 13 seats needed for a majority
	First party	Second party
Party	SNP	Labour
Last election	7 seats, 38.5%	14 seats, 47.0%
Seats won	11	10
Seat change	▲4	▼4
Popular vote	19,502	17,448
Percentage	43.0%	38.5%
Swing	▲4.5%	▼8.5%
	Third party	Fourth party
Party	Conservative	Independent
Last election	0 seats, 8.6%	2 seats, 3.2%
Seats won	2	1
Seat change	▲2	▼1
Popular vote	5,501	1,815
Percentage	12.2%	4.1%
Swing	▲3.6%	▲0.9%
- Map of ward results

- Council composition following the election

Elections to West Lothian District Council were held on 7 May 1992, on the same day as the other Scottish local government elections. This was the sixth and final election to the district council following the implementation of the Local Government (Scotland) Act 1973.

The election used the 24 wards created by the Initial Statutory Reviews of Electoral Arrangements in 1980. Each ward elected one councillor using first-past-the-post voting.

== Results ==
1992 West Lothian District Council election result
Party	Seats	Gains	Losses	Net gain/loss	Seats %	Votes %	Votes	+/−
SNP	11	4	0	▲4	45.8	43.0	19,502	▲4.5
Labour	10	1	5	▼4	41.6	38.5	17,448	▼8.5
Conservative	2	2	0	▲2	8.3	12.2	5,501	▲3.6
Independent	1	0	1	▼1	4.1	4.1	1,815	▲0.9
Liberal Democrats	0	0	0	Steady	0.0	2.4	1,088	New

== Ward results ==
Preston
Party	Candidate	Votes	%
SNP	J. McGinley (incumbent)	1,634	58.6
Conservative	A. Maxwell	645	23.1
Labour	J. H. Brown	509	18.3
Majority		989	35.5
Turnout		2789	47.8
SNP hold			

St Michaels
Party	Candidate	Votes	%
Conservative	T. Kerr	1,047	42.3
Liberal Democrats	P. A. Chapman	532	21.5
SNP	J. G. Wardrop	470	19.0
Labour	T. Conn	425	17.2
Majority		515	20.8
Turnout		2475	44.9
Conservative gain from Ind. Ratepayers			

Hopetoun
Party	Candidate	Votes	%
SNP	I Leslie	1,165	67.7
Labour	A. B. Blair	526	30.5
Majority		639	37.2
Turnout		2,789	44.9
SNP hold			

Barbauchlaw
Party	Candidate	Votes	%
SNP	J. G. M. Sibbald (incumbent)	1,077	55.9
Labour	N. Sinnet	840	43.6
Majority		237	12.3
Turnout		1,925	39.8
SNP hold			

Bathville
Party	Candidate	Votes	%
SNP	D. Mclean (incumbent)	940	66.9
Labour	C. N. Dahle	466	33.1
Majority		474	33.8
Turnout		1,406	35.6
SNP gain from Labour			

Easton
Party	Candidate	Votes	%
Labour	J. M. Campbell (incumbent)	852	40.7
SNP	G. B. Menzies	820	39.2
Independent	Mcl. C. Welsh	235	11.2
Conservative	J. L. Mumford	186	8.9
Majority		32	1.5
Turnout		2,094	43.5
SNP hold			

Newlands
Party	Candidate	Votes	%
Independent	J. Walker (incumbent)	994	47.9
SNP	A. Kerr	571	27.3
Labour	J. McNab	503	24.3
Majority		423	20.6
Turnout		2,073	48.2
Independent hold			

Starlaw
Party	Candidate	Votes	%
SNP	A. B. Gordon (incumbent)	1,380	55.4
Labour	A. Murphy	915	36.7
Conservative	J. A. Seeger	194	7.8
Majority		465	18.7
Turnout		2,490	52.7
SNP hold			

Burnbrae
Party	Candidate	Votes	%
SNP	W. D. Burns	855	52.3
Labour	W. Russell (incumbent)	772	47.2
Majority		83	5.1
Turnout		1,634	43.8
SNP gain from Labour			

Polkemmet
Party	Candidate	Votes	%
SNP	W. R. WcBride	1,027	52.2
Labour	R. Gamble (Incumbent)	933	47.5
Majority		94	4.7
Turnout		1,966	42.8
SNP gain from Labour			

Fauldhouse
Party	Candidate	Votes	%
Labour	R. Lee (Incumbent)	1,324	61.9
SNP	R. Cole	595	27.8
Conservative	T. Linton	220	10.3
Majority		729	34.1
Turnout		2,139	44.5
Labour hold			

Whitrigg
Party	Candidate	Votes	%
SNP	J. Dickson (Incumbent)	1,142	62.4
Labour	A. Mackie	547	29.9
Conservative	T. K. Graham	142	7.8
Majority		595	32.5
Turnout		1,831	42.2
SNP hold			

Deans
Party	Candidate	Votes	%
Labour	H. Owens	995	54.0
SNP	A. MacNeil	610	33.1
Conservative	H. J. Laurenson	238	12.9
Majority		385	20.9
Turnout		1,844	28.6
Labour hold			

Knightsbridge
Party	Candidate	Votes	%
Labour	M. C. W. Ryce (Incumbent)	492	43.7
SNP	J. Johnston	455	40.4
Conservative	C. C. Mac. Welwood	178	15.8
Majority		37	3.3
Turnout		1,125	30.3
Labour hold			

Ladywell
Party	Candidate	Votes	%
SNP	P. J. B. A. Johnston (Incumbent)	1,043	69.7
Labour	B. Moohan	359	24.0
Conservative	M. Wilson	93	6.2
Majority		684	45.7
Turnout		1,496	37.7
SNP hold			

Craigshill
Party	Candidate	Votes	%
SNP	F. Anderson (Incumbent)	696	55.7
Labour	M. M. Clark	303	24.3
Liberal Democrats	A. McC. Chalmers	157	12.6
Conservative	I. Black	93	7.4
Majority		393	31.4
Turnout		1,249	34.5
SNP hold			

Howden
Party	Candidate	Votes	%
Labour	T. J. Coleman (incumbent)	652	39.6
SNP	L. A. Burton	647	39.3
Conservative	J. T. Laurenson	215	13.1
Liberal Democrats	P. F. Chalmers	129	7.8
Majority		5	0.3
Turnout		1,645	30.8
Labour hold			

Bankton
Party	Candidate	Votes	%
SNP	J. A. Richardson	818	39.1
Labour	I. Barclay (incumbent)	775	37.0
Conservative	J. M. Gordon	493	23.5
Majority		43	2.1
Turnout		2,094	32.8
SNP gain from Labour			

Houston
Party	Candidate	Votes	%
Labour	A. Davidson	846	42.8
SNP	M. Patterson	738	37.3
Conservative	K. Graham	389	19.7
Majority		108	5.5
Turnout		1,976	42.7
Labour hold			

Strathbrock
Party	Candidate	Votes	%
Labour	J. Cumming (incumbent)	949	55.2
SNP	C. B. Campbell	550	32.0
Conservative	H. J. Spurway	216	23.6
Majority		399	23.2
Turnout		1,718	42.1
Labour hold			

Middleton
Party	Candidate	Votes	%
Labour	G. Morrice (incumbent)	914	60.7
SNP	J. MacD. Campbell	485	32.2
Conservative	V. E. M. Welwood	107	7.1
Majority		429	28.5
Turnout		1,507	42.4
Labour hold			

Linhouse
Party	Candidate	Votes	%
Conservative	I. G. Brydie	855	38.4
Labour	B. Muldoon	660	29.6
SNP	M. Doyle	523	23.5
Liberal Democrats	P. Hudson	187	8.4
Majority		195	8.8
Turnout		2,226	48.1
Conservative gain from Labour			

East Calder
Party	Candidate	Votes	%
Labour	D. J. King	600	31.4
Independent	W. S. C. Renwick (incumbent)	586	30.7
SNP	L. M. M. Irvine	449	23.5
Conservative	J. H. H. Gordon	190	10.0
Liberal Democrats	G. T. Durance	83	4.4
Majority		14	0.7
Turnout		1,908	45.2
Labour gain from Independent			

West Calder
Party	Candidate	Votes	%
Labour	J. Thomas (incumbent)	1,291	61.2
SNP	A. Constance	812	38.5
Majority		479	22.7
Turnout		2,111	46.1
Labour hold			
