= 1992 Monklands District Council election =

1992 Scottish local government election

Elections to the Monklands District Council took place in May 1992, alongside elections to the councils of Scotland's various other districts.

The result of the election

== Aggregate results ==
Monklands District Election Result 1992
Party	Seats	Gains	Losses	Net gain/loss	Seats %	Votes %	Votes	+/−
Labour	17					61.6	17,698	
SNP	3					31.4	8,737	
Conservative	0				0.0	7.7	2,205	
Independent	0				0.0	1.5	118	
