= 1992 Stirling District Council election =

1992 Scottish local government election

The 1992 Stirling District Council election took place on 7 May 1992, alongside elections to the councils of Scotland's various other districts.

The result of the election

== Results ==
1992 Stirling District Council election result
Party	Seats	Gains	Losses	Net gain/loss	Seats %	Votes %	Votes	+/−
Conservative	10			Steady	50.0	43.0	14,457	
Labour	10			Steady	50.0	34.2	11,485	
SNP	0			Steady	0.0	16.6	5,579	
Liberal Democrats	0			Steady	0.0	3.6	1,198	
Independent	0			Steady	0.0	1.7	543	
Scottish Green	0			Steady	0.0	1.2	387	
