= 1992 East Lothian District Council election =

Election in 1992, part of Scotland wide district council elections

Elections to the East Lothian District Council took place in May 1992, alongside elections to the councils of Scotland's various other districts.

The result of the election

== Ward results ==
=== Labour (9) ===
- Musselburgh East
- Musselburgh Central
- Musselburgh South
- Musselburgh West
- Tranent/Ormiston
- Carberry
- Prestonpans West
- Prestonpans East
- Lammermuir

=== Conservative (7) ===
- Cockenzie
- Gladsmuir
- Haddington
- Dirleton
- Dunbar
- East Linton
- North Berwick

=== SNP (1) ===
- Tranent North
