= 1992 Annandale and Eskdale District Council election =

1992 Scottish local government election

← 1988	7 May 1992

All 16 Seats to Annandale and Eskdale District Council 9 seats needed for a majority
- Turnout: 44.2%
	First party	Second party	Third party
Party	Liberal Democrats	Independent	Labour
Last election	8 seats, 37.7%	6 seats, 39.2%	2 seats, 16.8%
Seats won	9	6	1
Seat change	▲1	Steady	▼1
Popular vote	2,617	1,852	933
Percentage	46.5%	32.9%	16.6%
Swing	▲8.8%	▼6.3%	▼0.2%
- Composition of District Council after the election

The 1992 Annandale and Eskdale District Council election took place on 7 May 1992, alongside elections to the councils of Scotland's various other districts. This was the last election before the District council model of local government was abolished along with the Regional councils in favour of single-tier Unitary Authority councils.

9 seats were uncontested in this election.

== Results ==
1992 Annandale and Eskdale District Council election result
Party	Seats	Gains	Losses	Net gain/loss	Seats %	Votes %	Votes	+/−
Liberal Democrats	9			▲1	56.3	46.5	2,617	▲8.8
Independent	6			Steady	37.5	32.9	1,852	▼6.3
Labour	1			▼1	6.3	16.6	933	▼0.2
Conservative	0	0	0	Steady	0.0	4.1	229	▲2.8
