= 1992 Rochford District Council election =

Election

Elections to Rochford Council were held on 7 May 1992. One third of the council was up for election.

== Results summary ==
1992 Rochford Borough Council election
Party	This election			Full council			This election		
Party	Seats	Net	Seats %	Other	Total	Total %	Votes	Votes %	+/−
Liberal Democrats	5	Steady	35.7	14	19	46.2	6,590	36.3	
Conservative	7	▼2	50.0	4	11	28.2	8,386	46.2	
Labour	1	▲1	7.1	7	8	20.5	1,921	10.6	
Residents	1	▲1	7.1	0	1	2.6	1,237	6.8	
Ratepayer	0	Steady	0.0	1	1	2.6	0	0.0	

== Ward results ==
=== Ashington ===
Ashington
Party	Candidate	Votes	%	±%
Liberal Democrats	C. Askew	638	50.4	
Conservative	T. Butcher	578	45.6	
Labour	J. Farrer	51	4.0	
Majority			4.8	
Turnout			54.2	
Liberal Democrats hold		Swing		

=== Downhall ===
Downhall
Party	Candidate	Votes	%	±%
Liberal Democrats	C. Black	841	66.4	
Conservative	S. Ibrahim	426	33.6	
Majority			32.8	
Turnout			44.9	
Liberal Democrats hold		Swing		

=== Grange & Rawreth ===
Grange & Rawreth
Party	Candidate	Votes	%	±%
Liberal Democrats	P. Beckers	1,041	59.0	
Conservative	P. Savill	724	41.0	
Majority			18.0	
Turnout			40.8	
Liberal Democrats hold		Swing		

=== Hawkwell East ===
Hawkwell East
Party	Candidate	Votes	%	±%
Conservative	V. Clark	1,118	50.3	
Conservative	J. Roden	992		
Liberal Democrats	K. Glynn	933	42.0	
Liberal Democrats	K. Saunders	793		
Labour	C. Coyte	171	7.7	
Labour	G. Tasker	164		
Turnout			40.5	
Conservative hold				
Conservative hold				

=== Hakewell West ===
Hakewell West
Party	Candidate	Votes	%	±%
Conservative	T. Fawell	649	65.2	
Liberal Democrats	V. Leach	222	22.3	
Labour	I. Newton	125	12.6	
Majority			42.9	
Turnout			31.8	
Conservative hold		Swing		

=== Hockley Central ===
Hockley Central
Party	Candidate	Votes	%	±%
Conservative	P. Webster	428	50.5	
Residents	J. Seeth	311	36.7	
Liberal Democrats	R. Prestige	65	7.7	
Labour	S. Walsh	43	5.1	
Majority			13.8	
Turnout			45.0	
Conservative hold		Swing		

=== Hockley East ===
Hockley East
Party	Candidate	Votes	%	±%
Residents	A. Hutchings	926	73.1	
Conservative	B. Wilkins	267	21.1	
Labour	D. Thompson	49	3.9	
Liberal Democrats	M. Nudd	25	2.0	
Majority			52.0	
Turnout			40.0	
Residents gain from Conservative		Swing		

=== Hockley West ===
Hockley West
Party	Candidate	Votes	%	±%
Conservative	E. Hart	616	73.9	
Liberal Democrats	M. Pearson	141	16.9	
Labour	D. Thompson	76	9.1	
Majority			57.0	
Turnout			37.1	
Conservative hold		Swing		

=== Hullbridge Riverside ===
Hullbridge Riverside
Party	Candidate	Votes	%	±%
Labour	C. Morgan	609	51.3	
Conservative	R. Brown	579	48.7	
Majority			2.6	
Turnout			38.4	
Labour gain from Conservative		Swing		

=== Hullbridge South ===
Hullbridge South
Party	Candidate	Votes	%	±%
Conservative	L. Walker	433	52.5	
Labour	J. Stevenson	309	37.5	
Liberal Democrats	P. Pearse	82	10.0	
Majority			15.0	
Turnout			35.7	
Conservative hold		Swing		

=== Lodge ===
Lodge
Party	Candidate	Votes	%	±%
Liberal Democrats	S. Jarvis	1,070	59.7	
Conservative	J. Farrell	722	40.3	
Majority			19.4	
Turnout			38.4	
Liberal Democrats hold		Swing		

=== Rayleigh Central ===
Rayleigh Central
Party	Candidate	Votes	%	±%
Liberal Democrats	N. Harris	653	61.5	
Conservative	D. Geach	408	38.5	
Majority			23.0	
Turnout			36.5	
Liberal Democrats hold		Swing		

=== Rochford St. Andrew's ===
Rochford St. Andrew's
Party	Candidate	Votes	%	±%
Conservative	R. Amner	446	52.1	
Labour	M. Weir	324	37.9	
Liberal Democrats	M. Leach	86	10.0	
Majority			14.2	
Turnout			35.6	
Conservative hold		Swing		
