= 1992 Midlothian District Council election =

1992 Scottish local government election

Results by ward.

Elections to Midlothian Council were held in May 1992, the same day as the other Scottish local government elections. The election was the last for the Midlothian District Council, as the council would be replaced with the Midlothian unitary authority for the 1995 election. The election was also the last, in which a Conservative Councillor was elected until the election of 2017.

== Election results ==
The result of the election

Midlothian local election result 1992
| Party | Seats | Gains | Losses | Net gain/loss | Seats % | Votes % | Votes | +/− |
|---|---|---|---|---|---|---|---|---|
| Labour | 12 | 0 | 2 | ▼2 | | 46.2 | 11,792 | ▼9.9 |
| Conservative | 2 | 1 | 0 | ▲1 | | 19.8 | 5,037 | ▲5.1 |
| SNP | 1 | 1 | 0 | ▲1 | | 25.6 | 6,532 | ▲3.4 |
| Liberal Democrats | 0 | 0 | 0 | 0 | 0.0 | 7.2 | 1,819 | ▲2.7 |
| Green | 0 | 0 | 0 | 0 | 0.0 | 1.4 | 349 | New |
