= 1992 North East Fife District Council election =

1992 Scottish local government election

Results by ward.

Elections to North East Fife District Council were held in May 1992, the same day as the other Scottish local government elections. The election was the last for the North East Fife District Council, as the council would be replaced on 1 April 1996 by the Fife Council unitary authority after the 1995 election.

== Election results ==
The result of the election

North East Fife District Council Election Result 1992
Party	Seats	Gains	Losses	Net gain/loss	Seats %	Votes %	Votes	+/−
Liberal Democrats	13	1	0	▲1		48.8	12,808	▲1.4
Conservative	4	0	0	0		38.6	10,111	▲3.9
Independent	1	0	1	▼1		4.7	1,231	▼2.5
SNP	0	0	0	0	0.0	5.7	1,481	▲0.3
Labour	0	0	0	0	0.0	1.5	368	▼3.9
Green	0	0	0	0	0.0	1.0	255	New
