= 1992 Nithsdale District Council election =

1992 Scottish local government election

The result of the election

The 1992 Nithsdale District Council election took place on 7 May 1992, alongside elections to the councils of Scotland's various other districts.

== Results ==
1992 Nithsdale District Council election result
Party	Seats	Gains	Losses	Net gain/loss	Seats %	Votes %	Votes	+/−
Labour	9			▼3	32.1	31.5	4,037	▼7.7
Independent	8			▲2	28.6	29.0	3,715	▲12.1
Conservative	5			▲1	17.9	23.8	3,044	▼1.7
SNP	5			▼1	17.9	11.7	1,489	▼5.3
Liberal Democrats	1			▲1	3.6	4.2	537	▲2.5
