= 1992 Angus District Council election =

1992 Scottish local government election

The 1992 Angus District Council election took place on the 7 May 1992 to elect members of Angus District Council, as part of that year's Scottish local elections.

The result of the election

== Aggregate results ==
Angus District Election Result 1992
Party	Seats	Gains	Losses	Net gain/loss	Seats %	Votes %	Votes	+/−
SNP	11			-2		44.3	13,344	-1.1
Conservative	7			+1		30.1	9,069	-2.4
Liberal Democrats	1			0		9.5	2,849	+8.1
Independent	2			+1		8.4	2,547	+4.1
Labour	0	0		0	0.0	7.0	2,098	-2.8
Green	0	0		0	0.0	1.1	314	New

== Ward results ==
1. Harbour
Party	Candidate	Votes	%	±%
SNP	A. King	648	59.9	+4.9
Conservative	A. B. Brown	307	28.8	−4.9
Labour	A. G. Meade	90	8.3	−2.9
Green	W. J. D. Craig	36	3.3	+3.3
Majority		341		
Turnout			35.9	−10.6

2. Brothock
Party	Candidate	Votes	%	±%
SNP	I. J. Angus	1,109	76.6	+12.0
Labour	J. Warren	327	22.6	+5.1
Majority		782		
Turnout			35.7	−11.7
SNP hold		Swing		

3. Timmergreens and Elms
Party	Candidate	Votes	%	±%
SNP	C. S. B. Meldrum	687	47.2	−13.5
Liberal Democrats	J. R. McKelvie	686	47.1	+47.1
Labour	G. Buick	78	5.4	−12.6
Majority		1		
Turnout			43.7	−4.0
SNP hold		Swing		

4. Arbirlot/Hospitalfield
Party	Candidate	Votes	%	±%
Conservative	E. C. Hill	741	49.6	−6.6
Liberal Democrats	J. C. Steel	389	26.1	+26.1
SNP	D. T. Ritchie	314	21.0	−18.8
Labour	D. W. Savage	48	3.2	−2.8
Majority		352		
Turnout			47.9	−0.9

5. Marywell/Cliffburn
Party	Candidate	Votes	%	±%
SNP	S. M. Welsh	708	58.7	−5.4
Conservative	P. J. Farqhaur	309	25.6	+3.6
Labour	M. G. Law	115	9.5	−4.3
Green	D. M. McCabe	74	6.1	+6.2
Majority		399		
Turnout			35.3	−11.6
SNP hold		Swing		

6. Colliston/Hayshead
Party	Candidate	Votes	%	±%
SNP	B. M. C. Milne	702	54.4	+3.8
Conservative	J. W. Lindquist	360	28.2	+4.8
Labour	F. G. Pearson	215	16.8	−0.0
Majority		342		
Turnout			35.2	−14.6
SNP hold		Swing		

7. Carnoustie East
Party	Candidate	Votes	%	±%
Conservative	J. A. McAdam	1,285	54.0	+4.6
SNP	D. Hood	843	35.4	−7.0
Labour	D. G. Taylor	199	8.4	+3.7
Green	S. M. Murray	50	2.1	+2.1
Majority		442		
Turnout			44.6	−5.6

8. Carnoustie West and Panmure
Party	Candidate	Votes	%	±%
SNP	R. Lamont	729	46.9	−5.1
Conservative	I. G. Richmond	695	44.8	+6.7
Labour	A. J. Stuart	124	8.0	−1.9
Majority		34		
Turnout			37.4	−7.5
SNP hold		Swing		

9. Forfar Central/Lemno
Party	Candidate	Votes	%	±%
Conservative	A. E. D. Thomson	1,088	57.8	+5.7
SNP	E. I. Martin	666	35.4	−7.0
Labour	G. N. McDonald	128	6.8	+1.2
Majority		422		
Turnout			43.8	−4.3
Conservative hold		Swing		

10. Dunnichen
Party	Candidate	Votes	%	±%
SNP	G. Suttie	803	49.9	−11.2
Independent	C. A. W. Brown	700	43.5	+43.5
Green	P. C. Roberts	100	6.2	+6.3
Majority		103		
Turnout			41.0	−8.3
SNP hold		Swing		

11. Montrose North
Party	Candidate	Votes	%	±%
Independent	G. Norrie	914	59.8	+2.4
SNP	P. Valentine	269	17.6	+17.6
Conservative	P. A. Reed	224	14.7	−12.8
Labour	S. Singh	65	4.3	−10.6
Green	G. Campbell	54	3.5	+3.5
Majority		645		
Turnout			45.3	+0.9

12. Hillside
Party	Candidate	Votes	%	±%
SNP	K. M. Ritchie	646	45.0	−0.1
Conservative	D. M. Munro	524	36.5	+4.0
Labour	F. Wood	191	13.3	−8.9
Liberal Democrats	C. T. Ironside	75	5.2	+5.2
Majority		122		
Turnout			39.9	−6.9
SNP hold		Swing		

13. Kirriemuir
Party	Candidate	Votes	%	±%
Liberal Democrats	W. Doig	1,254	67.2	+16.7
SNP	I. Martin	605	32.4	−16.7
Majority		649		
Turnout			43.2	+0.2
Liberal Democrats hold		Swing		

14. Western Glens
Party	Candidate	Votes	%	±%
Conservative	R. Dundas	565	71.2	+7.8
SNP	K. Duncan	229	28.8	−7.8
Majority		336		
Turnout			43.9	−4.3

15. Eastern Glens
Party	Candidate	Votes	%	±%
Conservative	David Myles	469	70.1	+2.9
SNP	S. M. D. Gibson	200	29.9	−2.9
Majority		269		
Turnout			55.3	+7.0

16. Langlands
Party	Candidate	Votes	%	±%
SNP	Ian Hudghton	694	64.1	−3.4
Conservative	T. S. Simpson	322	29.8	+6.4
Labour	L. Hood	65	6.5	−2.6
Majority		372		
Turnout			32.6	−14.0

17. Westfield Dean
Party	Candidate	Votes	%	±%
SNP	A. E. Thomson	875	53.8	−10.3
Conservative	D. W. Hobbs	657	40.4	+4.7
Labour	G. J. McKenzie	91	5.6	+5.6
Majority		218		
Turnout			43.6	−7.1

18. Montrose South
Party	Candidate	Votes	%	±%
Independent	W. M. Philips	551	38.4	−0.9
SNP	H. Stewart	497	34.6	−7.5
Conservative	D. W. Rollston-Smith	334	23.4	+23.4
SLD	P. J. Stevens	54	3.8	−5.3
Majority		54		
Turnout			40.5	−1.8
Independent gain from SNP		Swing		

19. Lunan
Party	Candidate	Votes	%	±%
Conservative	D. J. Stubbs	561	37.3	−6.7
SNP	W. G. Crowe	526	35.0	−13.4
Independent	G. W. Cook	342	22.7	+22.7
Liberal Democrats	A. W. Warren	74	4.9	+4.9
Majority		35		
Turnout			42.0	−4.9
Conservative gain from SNP		Swing		

20. Brechin North
Party	Candidate	Votes	%	±%
Conservative	R. Leslie-Melville	628	36.8	−7.8
SNP	R. D. Cameron	594	34.8	−8.6
Liberal Democrats	P. Evans	317	18.6	+18.6
Labour	I. A. McFatridge	168	9.8	−2.0
Majority		34		
Turnout			47.4	−6.4
Conservative hold		Swing		

21. Brechin South
Party	Candidate	Votes	%	±%
SNP	J. Thomson	1,000	82.6	+19.0
Labour	D. K. Todd	194	16.0	−4.2
Majority		806		
Turnout			40.6	−11.3
SNP hold		Swing		
