= 1992 Caithness District Council election =

6th election to Caithness District Council

← 1988	7 May 1992	1995 →

All 16 seats to Caithness District Council 9 seats needed for a majority

	First party	Second party	Third party
Party	Independent	Labour	Liberal
Seats won	14	1	1
Seat change	▲1	▼1	▲1
Popular vote	3,512	0	0
Percentage	95.6%	0.0%	0.0%
Swing	▲3.1%	▼7.5%	New
Council Convener before election
John Young
Independent
Council Convener after election
John Young
Independent

The result of the election

Elections to the Caithness District Council took place on 7 May 1992, alongside elections to the councils of Scotland's various other districts. Independents remained in control of the council, winning 14 of the 16 seats. Nine candidates were elected unopposed, including one each from Labour and the Liberal Party. Voter turnout in the contested wards was 57.8%.

== Aggregate results ==
1992 Caithness District Council election result
Party	Seats	Gains	Losses	Net gain/loss	Seats %	Votes %	Votes	+/−
Independent	14	1	0	▲1	87.5	95.6	3,512	
Labour	1	0	1	▼1	6.25	0.0 (Note: Candidate elected unopposed)	0	
Liberal	1	0	0	0	6.25	0.0	0	
SNP	0	0	0	0	0.0	3.6	128	

== Ward results ==
1992 Caithness District Council election result
Ward	Councillor	Result
Ward 1	D. M. F. Waters	Independent hold
Ward 2	J. H. Fry	Independent gain from Labour
Ward 3	W. S. Smith	Independent hold
Ward 4	J. S. Rosie	Independent hold
Ward 5	A. Murray	Independent hold
Ward 6	A. A. Roy	Independent hold
Ward 7	G. W. Oag	Independent hold
Ward 8	G. G. Fraser	Independent hold
Ward 9	J. H. Green	Independent hold
Ward 10	D. A. Richard	Independent hold
Ward 11	W. A. Mowat	Liberal hold
Ward 12	P. C. Sutherland	Labour hold
Ward 13	J. M. Young	Independent hold
Ward 14	N. MacInnes	Independent hold
Ward 15	J. M. Mowat	Independent hold
Ward 16	A. I. MacDonald	Independent hold
