= 1992 Cumbernauld and Kilsyth District Council election =

1992 Scottish local government election

← 1988	7 May 1992

All 12 seats to Cumbernauld and Kilsyth District Council 7 seats needed for a majority
	First party	Second party
Party	Labour	SNP
Last election	6 seats, 51.5%	6 seats, 47.8%
Seats won	7	5
Seat change	▲1	▼1
Popular vote	9,565	9,303
Percentage	45.4%	44.1%
Swing	▼6.1%	▼3.7%
- Composition of District Council after the election

Elections to the Cumbernauld and Kilsyth District Council took place on 7 May 1992, alongside elections to the councils of Scotland's various other districts.

== Results ==
1992 Cumbernauld and Kilsyth District Council election result
Party	Seats	Gains	Losses	Net gain/loss	Seats %	Votes %	Votes	+/−
Labour	7	1	0	▲1	58.3	45.4	9,565	▼6.1
SNP	5	0	1	▼1	41.7	44.1	9,303	▼3.7
Conservative	0	0	0	Steady	0.0	8.9	1,880	New
Independent Nationalist	0	0	0	Steady	0.0	1.5	325	New
