= 1992 Dumbarton District Council election =

1992 Scottish local government election

← 1988	7 May 1992

All 16 seats to Dumbarton District Council 9 seats needed for a majority
	First party	Second party
Party	Labour	Conservative
Last election	7 seats, 38.5%	2 seats, 24.0%
Seats won	8	5
Seat change	▲1	▲1
Popular vote	7,491	8,161
Percentage	31.5%	35.4%
Swing	▼7.0%	▲11.4%
	Third party	Fourth party
Party	SNP	Independent
Last election	3 seats, 22.8%	2 seats, 9.5%
Seats won	2	1
Seat change	▼1	▼1
Popular vote	5,763	592
Percentage	24.3%	2.5%
Swing	▲1.5%	▼7.0%
- Composition after election

The 1992 Dumbarton District Council election took place on 7 May 1992, alongside elections to the councils of Scotland's various other districts.

== Results ==
1992 Dumbarton District Council election result
Party	Seats	Gains	Losses	Net gain/loss	Seats %	Votes %	Votes	+/−
Labour	8	1	0	▲1	50.0	31.5	7,491	▼7.0
Conservative	5	1	0	▲1	31.3	35.4	8,161	▲11.4
SNP	2	0	1	▼1	12.5	24.3	5,763	▲1.5
Independent	1	0	1	▼1	6.3	2.5	592	▼7.0
Liberal Democrats	0	0	0	Steady	0.0	7.6	1,786	▲5.8
