= 1992 Kincardine and Deeside District Council election =

1992 Scottish local government election

- 7 May 1992

All 12 seats to Kincardine and Deeside District Council 7 seats needed for a majority
- Turnout: 42.2%
| | First party | Second party |
|---|---|---|
| Party | Conservative | Independent |
| Last election | 2 seats, 14.6% | 6 seats, 45.0% |
| Seats won | 5 | 5 |
| Seat change | ▲3 | ▼1 |
| Popular vote | 5,950 | 4,792 |
| Percentage | 35.4% | 28.5% |
| Swing | ▲20.8% | ▼16.5% |
| | Third party | Fourth party |
| Party | Liberal Democrats | SNP |
| Last election | 3 seat, 21.3% | 1 seat, 11.1% |
| Seats won | 1 | 1 |
| Seat change | ▼2 | Steady |
| Popular vote | 3,804 | 1,692 |
| Percentage | 22.7% | 10.1% |
| Swing | ▲1.4% | ▼1.0% |
- Map of ward results

- Council composition following the election

Elections to Kincardine and Deeside District Council were held on 7 May 1992, on the same day as the other Scottish local government elections. This was the sixth and final election to the district council following the implementation of the Local Government (Scotland) Act 1973.

The election used the 12 wards created by the Initial Statutory Reviews of Electoral Arrangements in 1980. Each ward elected one councillor using first-past-the-post voting.

== Results ==
1992 Kincardine and Deeside District Council election result
| Party | Seats | Gains | Losses | Net gain/loss | Seats % | Votes % | Votes | +/− |
|---|---|---|---|---|---|---|---|---|
| Conservative | 5 | 3 | 0 | ▲3 | 41.7 | 35.4 | 5,950 | ▲20.8 |
| Independent | 5 | 0 | 1 | ▼1 | 41.7 | 28.5 | 4,792 | ▼16.5 |
| Liberal Democrats | 1 | 0 | 2 | ▼2 | 8.3 | 22.7 | 3,804 | ▲1.4 |
| SNP | 1 | 0 | 0 | Steady | 8.3 | 10.1 | 1,692 | ▼1.0 |
| Labour | 0 | 0 | 0 | Steady | 0.0 | 3.0 | 489 | ▼5.0 |
| Green | 0 | 0 | 0 | Steady | 0.0 | 0.7 | 103 | New |
