= 1992 Wigtown District Council election =

1992 Scottish local government election

The 1992 Wigtown District Council election took place in May 1992, alongside elections to the councils of Scotland's various other districts.

The result of the election

== Results ==
1992 Wigtown District Council election result
Party	Seats	Gains	Losses	Net gain/loss	Seats %	Votes %	Votes	+/−
Independent	10	0	2	▼2	71.4	52.5	3,715	▲1.5
SNP	2	0	1	▲1	14.3	20.8	1,753	▲0.2
Labour	1	0	0	Steady	7.1	23.5	1,979	▲15.1
Conservative	1	1	0	▲1	7.1	3.3	278	New
