= 1992 Gordon District Council election =

1992 Scottish local government election

- 7 May 1992

All 16 seats to Gordon District Councill 9 seats needed for a majority
	First party	Second party	Third party
Party	Independent	Liberal Democrats	Conservative
Last election	6 seats, 19.7%	10 seats, 49.7%	0 seats, 22.2%
Seats won	9	5	2
Seat change	▲3	▼5	▲2
Popular vote	6,801	7,762	3,105
Percentage	34.1%	39.0%	15.6%
Swing	▲14.4%	▼10.7%	▼6.6%
- Map of ward results

- Council composition following the election

Elections to Gordon District Council were held on 7 May 1992, on the same day as the other Scottish local government elections. This was the sixth and final election to the district council following the implementation of the Local Government (Scotland) Act 1973.

The election used the 16 wards created by the Initial Statutory Reviews of Electoral Arrangements in 1980. Each ward elected one councillor using first-past-the-post voting.

== Results ==
1992 Gordon District Council election result
Party	Seats	Gains	Losses	Net gain/loss	Seats %	Votes %	Votes	+/−
Independent	9			▲3	56.3	34.1	6,801	▲14.4
Liberal Democrats	5			▼5	31.3	39.0	7,762	▼10.7
Conservative	2			▲2	12.5	15.6	3,105	▼6.6
SNP	0			Steady	0.0	9.7	1,923	▲4.8
Labour	0			Steady	0.0	1.6	303	▼1.9
Green	0			Steady	0.0	0.3	53	New
