= 1992 Badenoch and Strathspey District Council election =

1992 Scottish local government election

← 1988	7 May 1992	1995 →

All 10 seats to Badenoch and Strathspey District Council 6 seats needed for a majority
	First party
Party	Independent
Seats won	10
Seat change	▲1
Popular vote	2,203
Percentage	80.8%
Swing	▲11.0%
Council Control before election
Independent
Council Control after election
Independent

Elections to the Badenoch and Strathspey District Council took place in May 1992, alongside elections to the councils of Scotland's various other districts.

== Aggregate results ==
Badenoch and Strathspey District Election Result 1992
Party	Seats	Gains	Losses	Net gain/loss	Seats %	Votes %	Votes	+/−
Independent	10	1	0	▲1	100.0	80.8	2,203	
SNP	0	0	1	▼1	0.0	15.7	428	
Scottish Green	0	0	0	0	0.0	2.0	54	
Labour	0	0	0	0	0.0	1.6	42	
