= Clydebank (district) =

Former local government district in Scotland

Coordinates: 55.96°N 4.40°W

- District
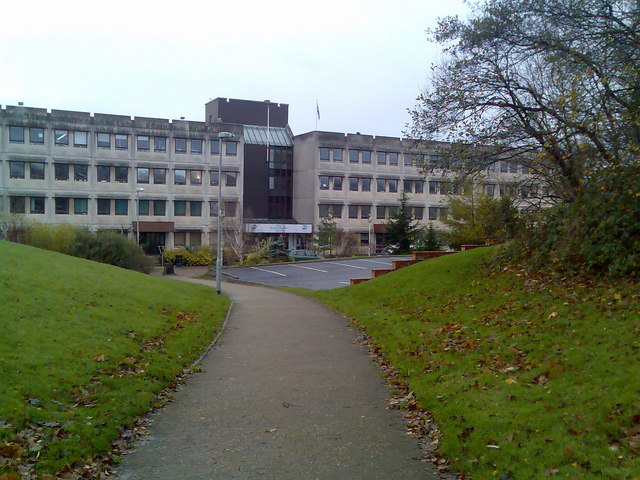
- Council Offices, Clydebank
- Population
  - 1991: 45,717
- History
  - Created: 16 May 1975
  - Abolished: 31 March 1996
  - Succeeded by: (Part of) West Dunbartonshire
- Government: Clydebank District Council
  - HQ: Clydebank

Clydebank (Scottish Gaelic: Bruach Chluaidh) was, from 1975 to 1996, one of nineteen local government districts in the Strathclyde region of Scotland, covering the town of Clydebank and adjoining areas to the north-west of the city of Glasgow.

== History ==
The district was created in 1975 under the Local Government (Scotland) Act 1973, which established a two-tier structure of local government across mainland Scotland comprising upper-tier regions and lower-tier districts. Clydebank was one of nineteen districts created within the region of Strathclyde. The district covered parts of two former districts from the historic county of Dunbartonshire, which were abolished at the same time:

- Clydebank Burgh
- Old Kilpatrick District: the landward (outside a burgh) parts of the parish of Old Kilpatrick which fell within the electoral divisions of Old Kilpatrick East, Old Kilpatrick West, Duntocher, and Hardgate.

Clydebank was one of the smallest districts by area. The main urban area was Clydebank, but the district also included the settlements of Duntocher, Faifley, Hardgate and Old Kilpatrick, along with the Kilpatrick Hills rising steeply to the north, The River Clyde was the district's southern boundary. The urban area of Glasgow lay to the south-east, and there was a tract of farmland to the north-east on the border with Bearsden and Milngavie. To the west was the Dumbarton district.

The district was abolished in 1996 under the Local Government etc. (Scotland) Act 1994 which replaced regions and districts with unitary council areas. The Clydebank area merged with much of neighbouring Dumbarton district to become the West Dunbartonshire council area. The 1994 act originally named the new district "Dumbarton and Clydebank", but the shadow authority elected in 1995 requested a change of name to "West Dunbartonshire", which was agreed by the government before the new council area came into force.

== Political control ==
The first election to the district council was held in 1974, initially operating as a shadow authority alongside the outgoing authorities until it came into its powers on 16 May 1975. Political control of the council from 1975 was as follows:

Party in control	Years
No overall control	1975–1980
Labour	1980–1996

=== Elections ===
Elections were held as follows:

Year	Seats	Labour	SNP	Conservative	Independent / Other	Notes
1974	10	5	4	1	0	
1977	10	3	5	1	1	
1980	10	8	0	1	1	
1984	12	11	0	1	0	
1988	12	11	0	1	0	
1992	12	8	2	1	1	

== Premises ==
The council was initially based at Clydebank Town Hall, which had been built in 1902 for the former Clydebank Town Council. Shortly after the new district's creation it built a new headquarters called Council Offices at the junction of Rosebery Place and Kilbowie Road, which was completed in 1979. After the council's abolition the Council Offices initially served as additional office space for West Dunbartonshire Council, which had its headquarters in Dumbarton. The Clydebank Council Offices were subsequently demolished in 2017.

== See also ==
- Subdivisions of Scotland
