= 1988 Rochford District Council election =

UK local election

- 5 May 1988

13 out of 40 seats to Rochford District Council 21 seats needed for a majority

	First party	Second party
Party	Conservative	SLD
Seats won	8	5
Seats after	22	13
Seat change	▼3	▲3
Popular vote	7,456	5,674
Percentage	46.0%	35.0%
Swing	▲0.5%	▼5.2%
	Third party	Fourth party
Party	Labour	Independent
Seats won	0	0
Seats after	4	1
Seat change	Steady	Steady
Popular vote	2,825	250
Percentage	17.4%	2.5%
Swing	▲4.9%	▼0.3%
Council control before election
Conservative
Council control after election
Conservative

The 1988 Rochford District Council election took place on 5 May 1988 to elect members of Rochford District Council in Essex, England. This was on the same day as other local elections.

== Summary ==
=== Election result ===
1988 Rochford District Council election
Party	This election			Full council			This election		
Party	Seats	Net	Seats %	Other	Total	Total %	Votes	Votes %	+/−
Conservative	8	▼3	61.5	14	22	55.0	7,456	46.0	+0.5
SLD	5	▲3	38.5	8	13	32.5	5,674	35.0	–5.2
Labour	0	Steady	0.0	4	4	10.0	2,825	17.4	+4.9
Independent	0	Steady	0.0	1	1	2.5	250	1.5	–0.3

== Ward results ==
Incumbent councillors standing for re-election are marked with an asterisk (*). Changes in seats do not take into account by-elections or defections.

=== Ashingdon ===
Ashingdon
Party	Candidate	Votes	%	±%
SLD	C. Wren	473	44.7	–11.3
Conservative	R. Warner	459	43.3	+7.7
Labour	R. McLeod	127	12.0	+3.3
Majority		14	1.3	–19.0
Turnout		1,059	44.3	–7.8
Registered electors		2,391		
SLD gain from Conservative		Swing	▼9.5	

=== Downhall ===
Downhall
Party	Candidate	Votes	%	±%
SLD	C. Black*	872	73.7	+4.3
Conservative	S. Fletcher	245	20.7	–9.9
Labour	J. Foley	66	5.6	N/A
Majority		627	53.0	+14.2
Turnout		1,183	43.8	+2.3
Registered electors		2,701		
SLD hold		Swing	▲7.1	

=== Grange & Rawreth ===
Grange & Rawreth
Party	Candidate	Votes	%	±%
SLD	P. Beckers*	933	47.7	+3.8
Conservative	B. Spencer	671	34.3	+0.6
Labour	S. Andre	350	17.9	–4.4
Majority		262	13.4	+3.2
Turnout		1,954	43.6	–0.5
Registered electors		4,482		
SLD hold		Swing	▲1.6	

=== Hawkwell East ===
Hawkwell East
Party	Candidate	Votes	%	±%
Conservative	J. Roden	1,026	54.2	+0.5
SLD	H. Glynn	592	31.3	–4.3
Labour	R. Cairey	275	14.5	+3.8
Majority		434	22.9	+4.7
Turnout		1,893	35.2	–7.6
Registered electors		5,378		
Conservative hold		Swing	▲2.4	

=== Hawkwell West ===
Hawkwell West
Party	Candidate	Votes	%	±%
Conservative	T. Fawell*	672	60.1	+9.4
Labour	V. Arnold	242	21.6	+10.7
SLD	B. Cummings	205	18.3	–20.0
Majority		430	38.4	+26.0
Turnout		1,119	35.6	–9.2
Registered electors		3,143		
Conservative hold		Swing	▼0.7	

=== Hockley Central ===
Hockley Central
Party	Candidate	Votes	%	±%
Conservative	E. Hart*	420	53.0	+1.0
SLD	S. Giles	373	47.0	+11.1
Majority		47	6.0	–10.1
Turnout		793	44.1	+1.6
Registered electors		1,798		
Conservative hold		Swing	▼5.1	

=== Hockley East ===
Hockley East
Party	Candidate	Votes	%	±%
Conservative	I. Godfrey	762	61.4	–2.9
SLD	W. Alabaster	245	19.7	N/A
Labour	J. Christie	234	18.9	–16.8
Majority		517	41.7	+13.1
Turnout		1,241	38.0	+6.7
Registered electors		3,266		
Conservative hold				

=== Hockley West ===
Hockley West
Party	Candidate	Votes	%	±%
Conservative	E. Marlow	535	65.6	–9.6
SLD	M. Nudd	189	23.2	–1.6
Labour	E. Gay	92	11.3	N/A
Majority		346	42.4	–8.0
Turnout		816	37.2	+8.4
Registered electors		2,194		
Conservative hold		Swing	▼4.0	

=== Hullbridge Riverside ===
Hullbridge Riverside
Party	Candidate	Votes	%	±%
Conservative	G. Hooper	554	51.8	+15.3
Labour	C. Morgan	515	48.2	+2.6
Majority		39	3.6	N/A
Turnout		1,069	34.5	–3.0
Registered electors		3,099		
Conservative hold		Swing	▲6.4	

=== Hullbridge South ===
Hullbridge South
Party	Candidate	Votes	%	±%
Conservative	L. Walker*	505	55.0	+2.9
Labour	M. Stevenson	414	45.0	–2.9
Majority		91	9.9	+5.8
Turnout		919	38.6	+5.0
Registered electors		2,381		
Conservative hold		Swing	▲2.9	

=== Lodge ===
Lodge
Party	Candidate	Votes	%	±%
SLD	S. Jarvis	1,139	55.9	+12.2
Conservative	J. Parriers-Taylor*	769	37.8	–10.9
Labour	J. Stracey	129	6.3	–1.3
Majority		370	18.2	N/A
Turnout		2,037	42.9	–5.7
Registered electors		4,748		
SLD gain from Conservative		Swing	▲11.6	

=== Rayleigh Central ===
Rayleigh Central
Party	Candidate	Votes	%	±%
SLD	N. Harris	407	40.4	+13.1
Conservative	D. Geach	351	34.8	+5.1
Independent	J. Bolton	250	24.8	N/A
Majority		56	5.6	N/A
Turnout		1,008	33.5	–6.4
Registered electors		3,009		
SLD gain from Conservative		Swing	▲4.0	

=== Rochford St Andrews ===
Rochford St Andrews
Party	Candidate	Votes	%	±%
Conservative	R. Amner	487	43.7	+6.9
Labour	M. Weir	381	34.2	–3.4
SLD	P. Wells	246	22.1	–3.5
Majority		106	9.5	N/A
Turnout		1,114	46.4	–2.5
Registered electors		2,401		
Conservative hold		Swing	▲5.2	
