= 1988 Welwyn Hatfield District Council election =

Welwyn Hatfield District Council election

The 1988 Welwyn Hatfield District Council election took place on 5 May 1988 to elect members of Welwyn Hatfield District Council in England. This was on the same day as other local elections.

== Summary ==
=== Election result ===
1988 Welwyn Hatfield District Council election
Party	This election			Full council			This election		
Party	Seats	Net	Seats %	Other	Total	Total %	Votes	Votes %	+/−
Labour	8	▼1	57.1	14	22	51.2	14,952	46.5	+13.1
Conservative	6	▲1	42.9	13	19	44.2	12,857	40.0	–4.0
Liberal Democrats	0	Steady	0.0	2	2	4.7	4,040	12.6	–10.0
SDP	0	Steady	0.0	0	0	0.0	284	0.9	N/A
