= 1988 Waveney District Council election =

1988 English local government election

- 5 May 1988

All 48 seats to Waveney District Council 25 seats needed for a majority

	First party	Second party
Party	Conservative	Labour
Seats won	6	7
Seats after	23	20
Seat change	▲1	▼1
Popular vote	11,544	11,705
Percentage	39.8%	40.3%
Swing	▲1.4%	▲9.0%
	Third party	Fourth party
Party	SLD	Independent
Seats won	2	1
Seats after	4	1
Seat change	Steady	Steady
Popular vote	5,102	684
Percentage	17.6%	2.4%
Swing	▼11.5%	▲1.2%
- Winner of each seat at the 1988 Waveney District Council election.
Control before election
No overall control
Control after election
No overall control

The 1988 Waveney District Council election took place on 5 May 1988 to elect members of Waveney District Council in Suffolk, England. This was on the same day as other local elections.

== Summary ==
=== Election result ===
1988 Waveney District Council election
Party	This election			Full council			This election		
Party	Seats	Net	Seats %	Other	Total	Total %	Votes	Votes %	+/−
Conservative	6	▲1	37.5	17	23	47.9	11,544	39.8	+1.4
Labour	7	▼1	43.8	13	20	41.7	11,705	40.3	+9.0
SLD	2	Steady	12.5	2	4	8.3	5,102	17.6	–11.5
Independent	1	Steady	6.3	0	1	2.1	684	2.4	+1.2

== Ward results ==
Incumbent councillors standing for re-election are marked with an asterisk (*). Changes in seats do not take into account by-elections or defections.

=== Beccles Town ===
Beccles Town
Party	Candidate	Votes	%	±%
Conservative	H. Fuller	912	44.6	
Labour	C. Adam	786	38.5	
SLD	E. Spencer	345	16.9	
Majority		126	6.2	
Turnout		2,043	36.4	
Registered electors		5,619		
Conservative hold				

=== Beccles Worlingham ===
Beccles Worlingham
Party	Candidate	Votes	%	±%
Labour	J. Yates*	619	52.6	
Conservative	P. Carter	558	47.4	
Majority		61	5.2	
Turnout		1,177	32.6	
Registered electors		3,607		
Labour hold				

=== Bungay ===
Bungay
Party	Candidate	Votes	%	±%
SLD	D. O'Neill	707	40.9	
Conservative	P. Scott	622	36.0	
Labour	F. Welsh	401	23.2	
Majority		85	4.9	
Turnout		1,730	46.8	
Registered electors		3,697		
SLD hold				

=== Carlton ===
Carlton
Party	Candidate	Votes	%	±%
Conservative	D. Collins	1,133	53.0	
SLD	C. Thomas	1,004	47.0	
Majority		129	6.0	
Turnout		2,137	34.6	
Registered electors		6,176		
Conservative hold				

=== Carlton Colville ===
Carlton Colville
Party	Candidate	Votes	%	±%
Independent	J. Mitchell*	684	55.3	
Conservative	A. Leedham	319	25.8	
Labour	R. Jack	235	19.0	
Majority		365	29.5	
Turnout		1,238	39.1	
Registered electors		3,164		
Independent hold				

=== Gunton ===
Gunton
Party	Candidate	Votes	%	±%
Conservative	J. Wright	1,181	55.6	
SLD	V. Caseley	943	44.4	
Majority		238	11.2	
Turnout		2,124	40.7	
Registered electors		5,225		
Conservative hold				

=== Halesworth ===
Halesworth
Party	Candidate	Votes	%	±%
Labour	E. Leverett*	992	58.7	
Conservative	A. Jackson	698	41.3	
Majority		294	17.4	
Turnout		1,690	47.6	
Registered electors		3,551		
Labour hold				

=== Harbour ===
Harbour
Party	Candidate	Votes	%	±%
Labour	S. Bostock	806	55.3	
SLD	J. Van Pelt	368	25.2	
Conservative	L. Guy	284	19.5	
Majority		438	30.0	
Turnout		1,458	35.1	
Registered electors		4,155		
Labour hold				

=== Kessingland ===
Kessingland
Party	Candidate	Votes	%	±%
Conservative	J. Abel	643	41.6	
Labour	T. Durie	578	37.4	
SLD	J. Meredith	326	21.1	
Majority		65	4.2	
Turnout		1,547	42.8	
Registered electors		3,616		
Conservative gain from Labour				

=== Kirkley ===
Kirkley
Party	Candidate	Votes	%	±%
SLD	B. Pointon*	844	43.4	
Labour	J. Riches	684	35.2	
Conservative	L. Jeffrey	415	21.4	
Majority		160	8.2	
Turnout		1,943	42.9	
Registered electors		4,526		
SLD hold				

=== Normanston ===
Normanston
Party	Candidate	Votes	%	±%
Labour	M. Ayers	1,024	67.5	
Conservative	G. Mason	345	22.8	
SLD	A. Knee	147	9.7	
Majority		679	44.8	
Turnout		1,516	32.7	
Registered electors		4,634		
Labour hold				

=== Oulton Broad ===
Oulton Broad
Party	Candidate	Votes	%	±%
Conservative	E. Back*	1,101	55.9	
Labour	J. Riches	867	44.1	
Majority		234	11.9	
Turnout		1,968	37.4	
Registered electors		5,267		
Conservative hold				

=== Pakefield ===
Pakefield
Party	Candidate	Votes	%	±%
Labour	G. Collins*	1,507	55.3	
Conservative	J. Day	1,029	37.8	
SLD	A. Shepherd	188	6.9	
Majority		478	17.5	
Turnout		2,724	47.5	
Registered electors		5,737		
Labour hold				

=== Southwold ===
Southwold
Party	Candidate	Votes	%	±%
Conservative	J. Goldsmith*	1,404	58.3	
Labour	D. Gower	775	32.2	
SLD	R. Winyard	230	9.5	
Majority		629	26.1	
Turnout		2,409	47.4	
Registered electors		5,077		
Conservative hold				

=== St. Margarets ===
St. Margarets
Party	Candidate	Votes	%	±%
Labour	A. Owen*	1,255	67.8	
Conservative	S. Rudd	595	32.2	
Majority		660	35.7	
Turnout		1,850	34.5	
Registered electors		5,360		
Labour hold				

=== Whitton ===
Whitton
Party	Candidate	Votes	%	±%
Labour	R. Carter	1,176	79.4	
Conservative	F. Seabridge	305	20.6	
Majority		871	58.8	
Turnout		1,481	33.2	
Registered electors		4,459		
Labour hold				

== By-elections ==
=== Beccles Town ===
Beccles Town by-election: 14 July 1988
Party	Candidate	Votes	%	±%
Conservative		845	55.8	
Labour		535	35.3	
Liberal Democrats		135	8.9	
Majority		310	20.5	
Turnout		1,515	25.0	
Registered electors		6,060		
Conservative hold		Swing		
