= 1988 North Bedfordshire Borough Council election =

North Bedfordshire Borough Council election

The 1988 North Bedfordshire Borough Council election took place on 3 May 1988 to elect members of North Bedfordshire Borough Council in England. This was on the same day as other local elections.

== Summary ==
=== Election result ===
1988 North Bedfordshire Borough Council election
Party	This election			Full council			This election		
Party	Seats	Net	Seats %	Other	Total	Total %	Votes	Votes %	+/−
Conservative	6	▼1	33.3	19	25	47.2	13,265	38.5	–8.9
SLD	6	Steady	33.3	8	14	26.4	8,520	24.7	+0.1
Labour	5	▲1	27.8	8	13	24.5	11,668	33.8	+6.2
Independent	1	Steady	5.6	0	1	1.9	819	2.4	+2.1
Green	0	Steady	0.0	0	0	0.0	218	0.6	N/A

== Ward results ==
=== Brickhill ===
Brickhill
Party	Candidate	Votes	%	±%
SLD	T. Hill*	1,249	46.1	+6.9
Conservative	E. Evans	1,174	43.4	+0.4
Labour	H. Mitchell	284	10.5	−1.6
Turnout		2,707	44.3	
SLD gain from Conservative		Swing		

The Liberal Democrats had previously gained the Conservative seat at a by-election.

=== Bromham ===
Bromham
Party	Candidate	Votes	%	±%
Conservative	G. Bates*	1,274	78.5	+0.3
SLD	W. Orman	201	12.4	+0.6
Labour	T. Albone	147	9.1	−0.8
Turnout		1,622	42.1	
Conservative hold		Swing		

=== Carlton ===
Carlton
Party	Candidate	Votes	%	±%
Independent	V. Brandon*	819	83.7	+83.7
Labour	T. Carroll	160	16.3	N/A
Turnout		979	55.2	
Independent hold		Swing		

=== Castle ===
Castle
Party	Candidate	Votes	%	±%
Conservative	G. Parkin	929	46.8	+4.4
Labour	M. Brophy	803	40.4	+0.1
SLD	K. Jones	255	12.8	−2.2
Turnout		1,987	44.7	
Conservative hold		Swing		

=== Cauldwell ===
Cauldwell
Party	Candidate	Votes	%	±%
Labour	R. Elford*	1,506	71.6	+1.8
Conservative	R. Pal	418	19.9	+2.8
SLD	A. Gerard	180	8.6	−1.7
Turnout		2,104	37.7	
Labour hold		Swing		

=== Clapham ===
Clapham
Party	Candidate	Votes	%	±%
SLD	R. Chybalski	718	52.4	−7.1
Conservative	J. Whatley	464	33.9	+13.0
Labour	J. Cartlidge	188	13.7	−5.9
Turnout		1,370	46.6	
SLD hold		Swing		

=== De Parys ===
De Parys
Party	Candidate	Votes	%	±%
Conservative	R. Gwynne Jones	1,049	42.6	−6.4
SLD	J. Crofts	1,018	41.4	+8.1
Labour	B. Jones	304	12.4	−5.4
Green	A. Roche	89	3.6	N/A
Turnout		2,460	44.5	
Conservative hold		Swing		

=== Eastcotts ===
Eastcotts
Party	Candidate	Votes	%	±%
SLD	T. Dunning	367	44.2	−10.4
Conservative	V. Fattorusso*	299	36.0	−18.6
Labour	A. Tester	165	19.9	N/A
Turnout		831	38.3	
SLD hold		Swing		

V. Fattorusso was originally elected for the Liberal-SDP Alliance, but had defected to the Conservatives prior to the election.

=== Goldington ===
Goldington
Party	Candidate	Votes	%	±%
SLD	A. Christie	1,036	45.4	−2.7
Labour	D. Verney	798	35.0	−1.2
Conservative	V. Fulford	447	19.6	+4.0
Turnout		2,281	41.8	
SLD hold		Swing		

=== Harpur ===
Harpur
Party	Candidate	Votes	%	±%
Labour	C. Atkins	1,201	56.3	+16.6
Conservative	M. Mactoom	759	35.6	−14.9
SLD	R. Bossingham	112	5.2	−4.6
Green	K. Royal	62	2.9	N/A
Turnout		2,134	40.5	
Labour gain from Conservative		Swing		

=== Kempston East ===
Kempston East
Party	Candidate	Votes	%	±%
Labour	D. Lewis*	1,309	49.1	+1.7
Conservative	M. Williams	1,233	46.3	+7.2
SLD	M. Christie	122	4.6	−8.9
Turnout		2,664	38.5	
Labour hold		Swing		

=== Kempston West ===
Kempston West
Party	Candidate	Votes	%	±%
Conservative	M. Stupple*	1,112	50.1	+6.6
Labour	A. Beardmore	975	43.9	+1.4
SLD	B. Gibbons	133	6.0	−8.0
Turnout		2,220	39.0	
Conservative hold		Swing		

=== Kingsbrook ===
Kingsbrook
Party	Candidate	Votes	%	±%
Labour	I. Luder*	1,179	48.9	+0.9
SLD	T. Outen	907	37.7	−2.5
Conservative	A. Simic	323	13.4	+1.6
Turnout		2,409	43.7	
Labour hold		Swing		

=== Newnham ===
Newnham
Party	Candidate	Votes	%	±%
SLD	A. Lennon*	643	40.8	−7.8
Conservative	M. Simmonds	569	36.1	+1.8
Labour	P. Render	365	23.1	+5.9
Turnout		1,577	41.1	
SLD hold		Swing		

=== Putnoe ===
Putnoe
Party	Candidate	Votes	%	±%
SLD	J. Lennon	1,309	47.1	−1.8
Conservative	J. Temperley**	1,290	46.5	+5.9
Labour	R. Ward	178	6.4	−0.3
Turnout		2,777	49.3	
SLD hold		Swing		

J. Temperley was a sitting councillor for Harpur ward.

=== Queen's Park ===
Queen's Park
Party	Candidate	Votes	%	±%
Labour	M. Cotter*	1,215	66.0	−1.7
Conservative	G. Frost	446	24.2	+1.9
SLD	C. Hedge	112	6.1	−3.8
Green	S. Hunt	67	3.6	N/A
Turnout		1,840	35.4	
Labour hold		Swing		

=== Roxton ===
Roxton
Party	Candidate	Votes	%	±%
Conservative	J. Hughes	612	79.1	+24.4
Labour	D. Ward	101	13.0	N/A
SLD	A. Chybalski	61	7.9	−6.6
Turnout		774	41.2	
Conservative hold		Swing		

=== Wootton ===
Wootton
Party	Candidate	Votes	%	±%
Conservative	J. Tait	867	49.4	+13.2
Labour	B. Keens	790	45.0	+15.8
SLD	V. Hawke	97	5.5	−4.4
Turnout		1,754	50.0	
Conservative hold		Swing		
