= 1988 Hertsmere Borough Council election =

Local election in England

- 5 May 1988

13 out of 39 seats to Hertsmere Borough Council 20 seats needed for a majority
- Registered: 47,581
- Turnout: 38.6% (▼12.8%)

	First party	Second party	Third party
Party	Conservative	Labour	SLD
Seats won	9	3	1
Seats after	22	12	5
Seat change	▲1	Steady	▼1
Popular vote	10,126	4,649	2,865
Percentage	55.2%	25.3%	15.6%
Swing	▲12.4%	▼4.3%	▼12.0%
- Winner of each seat at the 1988 Hertsmere Borough Council election. Wards in white were not contested.
Control before election
Conservative
Control after election
Conservative

The 1988 Hertsmere Borough Council election took place on 5 May 1988 to elect members of Hertsmere Borough Council in Hertfordshire, England. This was on the same day as other local elections.

== Summary ==
=== Election result ===
1988 Hertsmere Borough Council election
Party	This election				Full council			This election		
Party	Candidates	Seats	Net	Seats %	Other	Total	Total %	Votes	Votes %	+/−
Conservative	{{{candidates}}}	9	▲1	69.2	13	22	56.4	10,126	55.2	+12.4
Labour	{{{candidates}}}	3	Steady	23.1	9	12	30.8	4,649	25.3	–4.3
SLD	{{{candidates}}}	1	▼1	7.7	4	5	12.8	2,865	15.6	–12.0
SDP	{{{candidates}}}	0	Steady	0.0	0	0	0.0	710	3.9	N/A

== Ward results ==
Incumbent councillors standing for re-election are marked with an asterisk (*). Changes in seats do not take into account by-elections or defections.

=== Aldenham West ===
Aldenham West
Party	Candidate	Votes	%	±%
Conservative	I. Southern	898	56.6	+3.5
Labour	A. Page	429	27.0	+7.2
SDP	C. Treves-Brown	259	16.3	N/A
Majority		469	29.6	+3.6
Turnout		1,586	45.1	–9.4
Registered electors		3,517		
Conservative hold		Swing	▼1.9	

=== Cowley ===
Cowley
Party	Candidate	Votes	%	±%
Labour	P. Roach*	759	62.0	+11.9
Conservative	C. Sullivan	388	31.7	+1.1
SLD	H. Brass	77	6.3	–13.0
Majority		371	30.3	+10.8
Turnout		1,224	28.9	–5.7
Registered electors		4,235		
Labour hold		Swing	▲5.4	

=== Heath North ===
Heath North
Party	Candidate	Votes	%	±%
Conservative	B. Batten*	910	65.7	+16.3
SLD	G. Hillier	277	20.0	–20.0
Labour	D. Hoeksma	199	14.4	+3.8
Majority		633	45.7	+36.6
Turnout		1,386	35.3	–12.4
Registered electors		3,926		
Conservative hold		Swing	▲18.2	

=== Heath South ===
Heath South
Party	Candidate	Votes	%	±%
Conservative	P. Riches*	1,017	72.7	+11.3
SDP	R. Brown	199	14.2	N/A
Labour	D. Bearfield	182	13.0	+3.8
Majority		818	58.5	+26.5
Turnout		1,398	37.8	–3.5
Registered electors		3,698		
Conservative hold				

=== Hillside ===
Hillside
Party	Candidate	Votes	%	±%
Labour	J. Kentish*	706	52.0	+6.3
Conservative	D. Chettleburgh	552	40.7	+2.5
SDP	M. Kirsh	99	7.3	N/A
Majority		154	11.3	+3.8
Turnout		1,357	39.8	–5.2
Registered electors		3,410		
Labour hold		Swing	▲1.9	

=== Lyndhurst ===
Lyndhurst
Party	Candidate	Votes	%	±%
Labour	G. Franklin	733	52.5	+12.3
Conservative	P. Poole	509	36.5	+3.6
SDP	L. Reefe	153	11.0	N/A
Majority		224	16.0	+8.7
Turnout		1,395	35.3	–16.4
Registered electors		3,952		
Labour hold		Swing	▲4.4	

=== Potters Bar Central ===
Potters Bar Central
Party	Candidate	Votes	%	±%
Conservative	P. Spratt*	690	51.0	+5.3
SLD	D. Martin	367	27.1	–7.5
Labour	N. Bradbury	295	21.8	+2.1
Majority		323	23.9	+12.8
Turnout		1,352	42.7	–8.8
Registered electors		3,166		
Conservative hold		Swing	▲6.4	

=== Potters Bar East ===
Potters Bar East
Party	Candidate	Votes	%	±%
Conservative	D. Ferguson*	1,144	64.1	+2.3
Labour	P. Bradbury	373	20.9	+5.8
SLD	C. Dean	267	15.0	–8.2
Majority		771	43.2	+16.1
Turnout		1,784	37.2	–6.1
Registered electors		4,796		
Conservative hold		Swing	▼1.8	

=== Potters Bar North ===
Potters Bar North
Party	Candidate	Votes	%	±%
Conservative	M. Johnson*	1,061	76.6	+10.6
SLD	L. Martin	206	14.9	–11.1
Labour	J. Clark	119	8.6	+0.5
Majority		855	61.7	+21.7
Turnout		1,386	37.4	–7.9
Registered electors		3,706		
Conservative hold		Swing	▲10.9	

=== Potters Bar South ===
Potters Bar South
Party	Candidate	Votes	%	±%
Conservative	G. Ferguson*	697	67.0	+12.5
Labour	R. Angel	240	23.1	–0.4
SLD	P. Shannon	104	10.0	–12.0
Majority		457	43.9	+12.9
Turnout		1,041	36.0	–14.0
Registered electors		2,892		
Conservative hold		Swing	▲6.5	

=== Potters Bar West ===
Potters Bar West
Party	Candidate	Votes	%	±%
Conservative	J. Paterson	789	59.5	–4.1
Labour	J. Cryer	299	22.6	N/A
SLD	J. Hurd	237	17.9	–18.5
Majority		490	36.9	–6.9
Turnout		1,325	36.2	–7.6
Registered electors		3,660		
Conservative hold				

=== St. James East ===
St. James East
Party	Candidate	Votes	%	±%
SLD	L. Hodgson*	750	53.1	±0.0
Conservative	J. McKenzie	504	35.7	+6.4
Labour	P. Halsey	159	11.3	–6.3
Majority		246	17.4	–6.4
Turnout		1,413	45.1	–6.2
Registered electors		3,133		
SLD hold		Swing	▼3.2	

=== St. James West ===
St. James West
Party	Candidate	Votes	%	±%
Conservative	A. Attwood	967	56.8	+11.4
SLD	A. Golland	580	34.1	–12.2
Labour	S. Schofield	156	9.2	+0.9
Majority		387	22.7	N/A
Turnout		1,703	48.8	–12.2
Registered electors		3,490		
Conservative gain from SLD		Swing	▲11.8	
