= 1988 Renfrew District Council election =

1988 Scottish local government election

The 1988 Renfrew District Council election was held on 5 May 1988, alongside elections to the councils of Scotland's various other districts.

== Results ==
1988 Renfrew District Council election result
Party	Seats	Gains	Losses	Net gain/loss	Seats %	Votes %	Votes	+/−
Labour	32	1	4	▼3	71.1	48.6	34,166	
Conservative	6	4	2	▲2	13.3	18.3	12,884	
SNP	4	1	1	Steady	8.9	25.0	17,571	
SSLD	3	3	2	▲1	6.7	6.0	4,187	
SDP	0	0	0	Steady	0.0	1.1	760	New
Independent	0	0	0	Steady	0.0	0.7	500	
Green	0	0	0	Steady	0.0	0.3	245	
