= 1988 Worthing Borough Council election =

1988 English local election

- 5 May 1988

12 out of 36 seats to Worthing Borough Council 19 seats needed for a majority

	First party	Second party
Party	Conservative	SLD
Last election	24 seats, 56.1%	12 seats, 36.3%
Seats won	10	2
Seats after	26	10
Seat change	▲2	▼2
Popular vote	15,206	8,594
Percentage	59.2%	33.4%
Swing	▲3.1%	▼2.9%
Council control before election
Conservative
Council control after election
Conservative

The 1988 Worthing Borough Council election took place on 5 May 1988 to elect members of Worthing Borough Council in West Sussex, England. This was on the same day as other local elections.

== Summary ==
=== Election result ===
1988 Worthing Borough Council election
Party	This election				Full council			This election		
Party	Candidates	Seats	Net	Seats %	Other	Total	Total %	Votes	Votes %	+/−
Conservative	{{{candidates}}}	10	▲2	83.3	16	26	72.2	15,206	59.2	+3.1
SLD	{{{candidates}}}	2	▼2	16.7	8	10	27.8	8,594	33.4	–2.9
Labour	{{{candidates}}}	0	Steady	0.0	0	0	0.0	1,900	7.4	–0.2

== Ward results ==
=== Broadwater ===
Broadwater
Party	Candidate	Votes	%	±%
SLD	B. McLuskie*	1,205	54.2	–8.4
Conservative	P. Hooker	856	38.5	+7.1
Labour	B. Wright	164	7.4	+1.4
Majority		349	15.7	–15.5
Turnout		2,225	33.7	–6.9
Registered electors		6,593		
SLD hold		Swing	▲7.8	

=== Castle ===
Castle
Party	Candidate	Votes	%	±%
Conservative	S. Brookman	977	53.0	+3.6
Labour	J. Hammond	472	25.6	+17.2
SLD	E. Russell	393	21.3	–20.9
Majority		505	27.4	+20.2
Turnout		1,842	28.8	–11.8
Registered electors		6,393		
Conservative gain from SLD		Swing	▼6.8	

=== Central ===
Central
Party	Candidate	Votes	%	±%
Conservative	G. Robinson*	782	44.4	–0.9
SLD	T. Chick	764	43.4	–0.5
Labour	M. Brunsden	214	12.2	+1.4
Majority		18	1.0	–0.4
Turnout		1,760	30.3	–6.5
Registered electors		5,804		
Conservative gain from SLD		Swing	▼0.2	

=== Durrington ===
Durrington
Party	Candidate	Votes	%	±%
Conservative	V. Sutton	1,309	54.8	+6.6
SLD	J. Lovell	1,081	45.2	+0.7
Majority		228	9.5	+5.8
Turnout		2,390	34.7	–12.9
Registered electors		6,893		
Conservative hold		Swing	▲3.0	

=== Gaisford ===
Gaisford
Party	Candidate	Votes	%	±%
SLD	G. Miller	995	45.9	–1.5
Conservative	R. Goodhind	989	45.6	–0.2
Labour	V. Brunsden	184	8.5	+1.6
Majority		6	0.3	–1.3
Turnout		2,168	33.5	–10.6
Registered electors		6,462		
SLD hold		Swing	▼0.7	

=== Goring ===
Goring
Party	Candidate	Votes	%	±%
Conservative	C. Cable-Robbie*	2,018	79.1	+12.5
SLD	D. Whybred	532	20.9	–8.6
Majority		1,486	58.3	+21.2
Turnout		2,550	36.7	–15.2
Registered electors		6,957		
Conservative hold		Swing	▲10.6	

=== Heene ===
Heene
Party	Candidate	Votes	%	±%
Conservative	S. Moore*	1,517	71.2	+3.3
SLD	P. Russell	613	28.8	+3.3
Majority		904	42.4	±0.0
Turnout		2,130	31.5	–9.8
Registered electors		6,767		
Conservative hold		Swing	0.0	

=== Marine ===
Marine
Party	Candidate	Votes	%	±%
Conservative	M. Parkin*	1,571	72.9	+1.8
SLD	R. Selley	358	16.6	–6.0
Labour	K. Fisher	226	10.5	+4.2
Majority		1,213	56.3	+7.8
Turnout		2,155	33.6	–12.2
Registered electors		6,437		
Conservative hold		Swing	▲3.9	

=== Offington ===
Offington
Party	Candidate	Votes	%	±%
Conservative	S. Elliott*	1,467	65.8	–1.3
SLD	E. Mardell	763	34.2	+5.9
Majority		704	31.6	–7.3
Turnout		2,230	35.1	–11.2
Registered electors		6,352		
Conservative hold		Swing	▼3.6	

=== Salvington ===
Salvington
Party	Candidate	Votes	%	±%
Conservative	A. Lynn	1,556	66.0	–0.6
SLD	A. Clare	803	34.0	+6.8
Majority		753	31.9	–7.4
Turnout		2,359	34.8	–9.0
Registered electors		6,770		
Conservative hold		Swing	▼3.7	

=== Selden ===
Selden
Party	Candidate	Votes	%	±%
Conservative	E. Baird*	942	51.2	–1.0
SLD	I. Richards	541	29.4	+1.2
Labour	B. Croft	358	19.4	–0.2
Majority		401	21.8	–2.2
Turnout		1,841	29.2	–11.1
Registered electors		6,314		
Conservative hold		Swing	▼1.1	

=== Tarring ===
Tarring
Party	Candidate	Votes	%	±%
Conservative	S. Todd*	1,222	59.6	+6.5
SLD	M. Davie	546	26.6	–12.5
Labour	J. Goatcher	282	13.8	+6.0
Majority		676	33.0	+25.2
Turnout		2,050	30.8	–14.1
Registered electors		6,666		
Conservative hold		Swing	▲9.5	
