= 1988 Scottish local elections =

- 5 May 1988
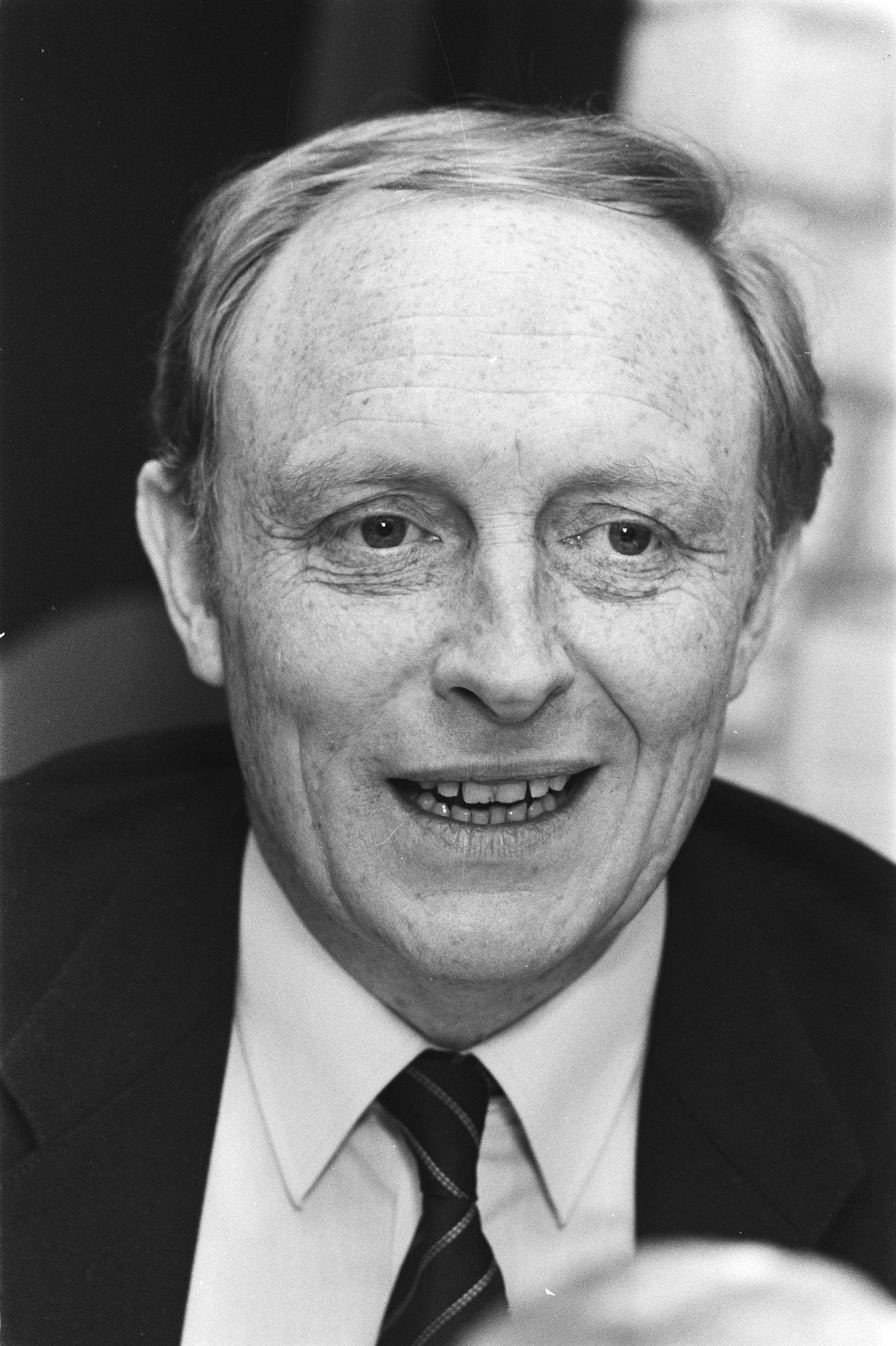

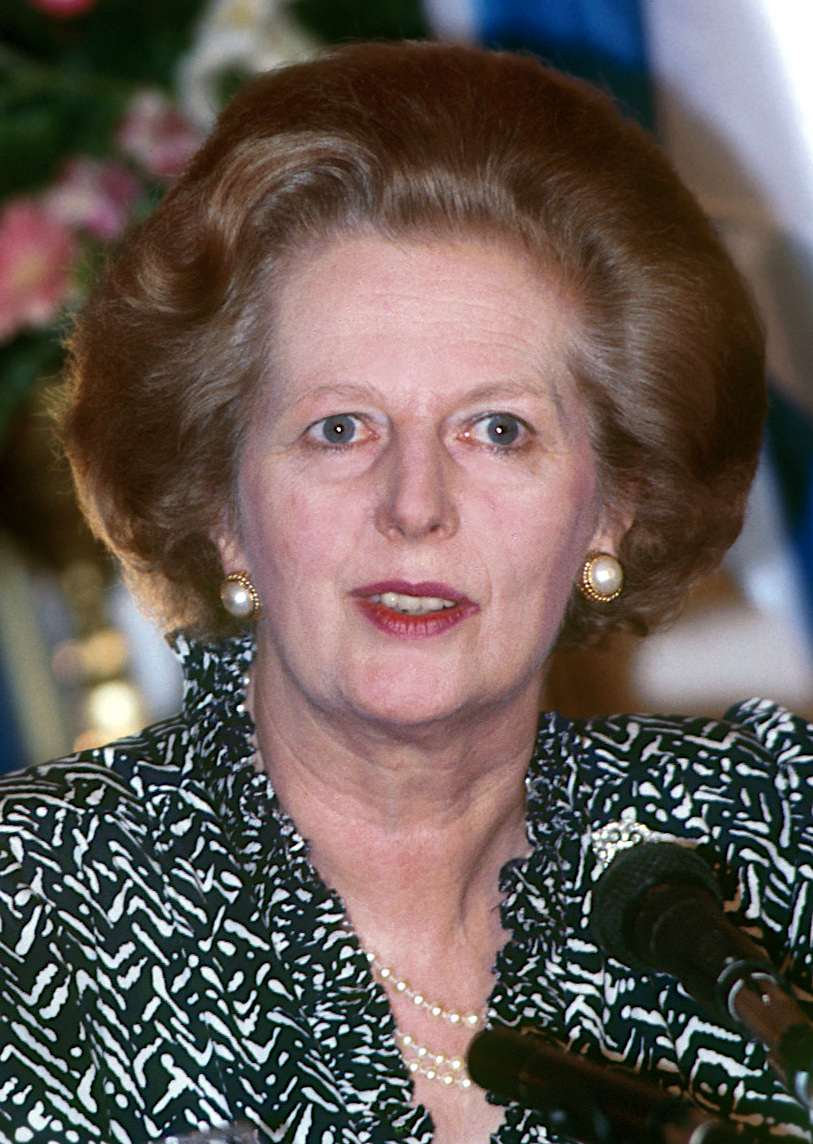

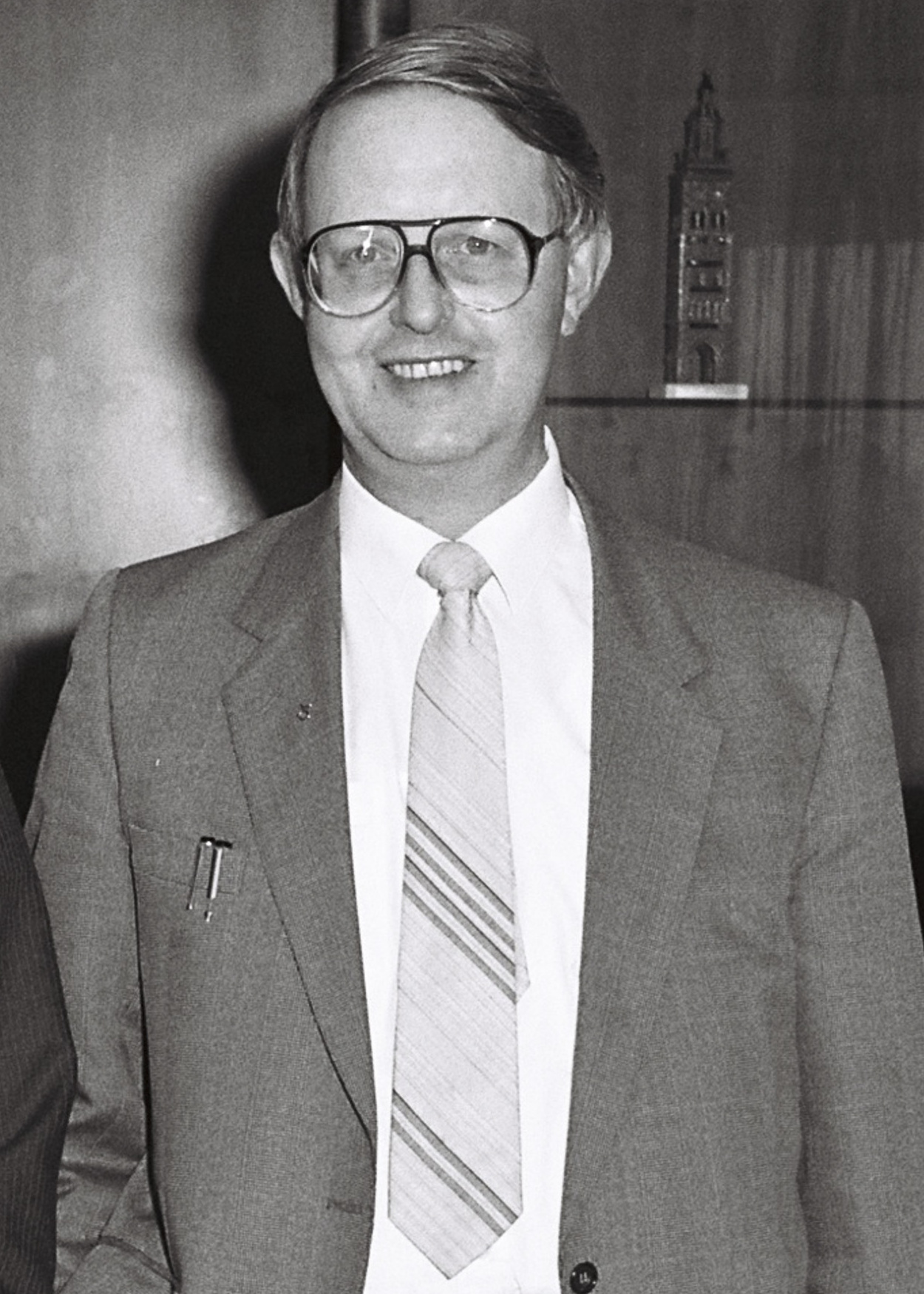

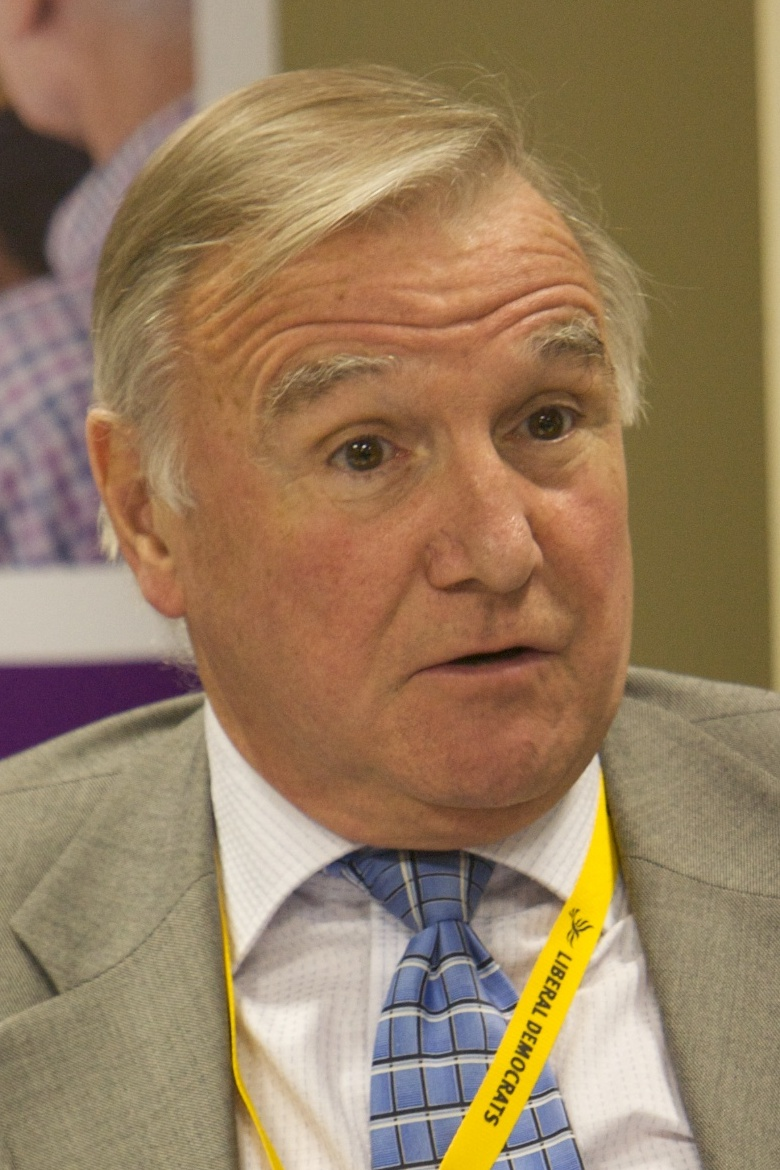
	First party	Second party
Leader	Neil Kinnock	Margaret Thatcher
Party	Labour	Conservative
Leader since	2 October 1983	11 February 1975
Seats won	553	162
Seat change	▲8	▼27
Percentage	42.6%	19.4%
Swing	▼3.1%	▼2.0%
	Third party	Fourth party
Leader	Gordon Wilson	Malcolm Bruce
Party	SNP	SSLD
Leader since	15 September 1979	3 March 1988
Seats won	113	84
Seat change	▲54	▲6
Percentage	21.3%	8.4%
Swing	▲9.6%	▼4.4%
- Colours denote the winning party with outright control

Local elections were held in Scotland on 5 May 1988, to elect members to all 53 district councils under the Local Government (Scotland) Act 1973, which had established the two-tier system of regions and districts.

== National results ==
Summary of the 1988 Scottish district council election results
Parties	Votes	Votes %	Wards
Labour		42.6	553
SNP		21.3	113
Conservative		19.4	162
SSLD		8.4	84
Independent		6.4	231
Other			
Total		n/a	~1158

== Results by region ==
=== Borders ===
District	1984 result	1988 result	Turnout	Details
Berwickshire	Conservative	Conservative		Details
Ettrick and Lauderdale	Independent	Independent		Details
Roxburghshire	Independent	Independent		Details
Tweeddale	Independent	Independent		Details

=== Central ===
District	1984 result	1988 result	Turnout	Details
Clackmannan	Labour	Labour		Details
Falkirk	Labour	Labour		Details
Stirling	Labour	No overall control		Details

=== Dumfries and Galloway ===
District	1984 result	1988 result	Turnout	Details
Annandale and Eskdale	Independent	SSLD		Details
Wigtown	Independent politician)	Independent		Details
Nithsdale	Independent	Labour		Details
Stewartry	Independent	Independent		Details

=== Fife ===
District	1984 result	1988 result	Turnout	Details
Dunfermline	Labour	Labour		Details
Kirkcaldy	Labour	Labour		Details
North-East Fife	Alliance	SSLD		Details

=== Grampian ===
District	1984 result	1988 result	Turnout	Details
Banff and Buchan	Independent	Independent		Details
City of Aberdeen	Labour	No overall control		Details
Gordon	Independent	No overall control		Details
Kincardine and Deeside	Independent	Independent		Details
Moray	Independent	Independent		Details

=== Highland ===
District	1984 result	1988 result	Turnout	Details
Badenoch and Strathspey	Independent	Independent		Details
Caithness	Independent	Independent		Details
Inverness	Independent	Independent		Details
Lochaber	Independent	Independent		Details
Nairn	Independent	Independent		Details
Ross and Cromarty	Independent	Independent		Details
Skye and Lochalsh	Independent	Independent		Details
Sutherland	Independent	Independent		Details

=== Lothian ===
District	1984 result	1988 result	Turnout	Details
City of Edinburgh	Labour	Labour		Details
East Lothian	Labour	Labour		Details
Midlothian	Labour	Labour		Details
West Lothian	Labour	Labour		Details

=== Strathclyde ===
District	1984 result	1988 result	Turnout	Details
Argyll and Bute	Independent	Independent		Details
Bearsden and Milngavie	Conservative	Conservative		Details
Cumbernauld and Kilsyth	Labour	No overall control		Details
Clydebank	Labour	Labour		Details
Cunninghame	Labour	Labour		Details
Cumnock and Doon Valley	Labour	Labour		Details
Dumbarton	Labour	No overall control		Details
East Kilbride	Labour	Labour		Details
Eastwood	Conservative	Conservative		Details
City of Glasgow	Labour	Labour		Details
Hamilton	Labour	Labour		Details
Inverclyde	Labour	Labour		Details
Kilmarnock and Loudoun	Labour	Labour		Details
Kyle and Carrick	Conservative	Labour		Details
Clydesdale	Labour	Labour		Details
Motherwell	Labour	Labour		Details
Monklands	Labour	Labour		Details
Strathkelvin	Labour	Labour		Details

=== Tayside ===
District	1984 result	1988 result	Turnout	Details
Angus	SNP	SNP		Details
City of Dundee	Labour	Labour		Details
Perth and Kinross	Conservative	No overall control		Details
