= 1988 Gloucester City Council election =

UK local election

The 1988 Gloucester City Council election took place on 3 May 1988 to elect members of Gloucester City Council in England.

== Results ==
Gloucester City Council election, 1988
Party	Seats	Gains	Losses	Net gain/loss	Seats %	Votes %	Votes	+/−
Conservative	17				51.5			
Labour	9				27.3			
SLD	6				18.2			
Other	1				3.0			

== Ward results ==
=== Barnwood ===
Barnwood 1988
Party	Candidate	Votes	%	±%
Conservative	J. Cook	2,052	51.7	
Labour	Ms.* E. Hedge	1,639	41.3	
SLD	Ms. V. Wilcox	275	6.9	
Turnout		3,966	43.6	
Conservative hold		Swing		

=== Barton ===
Barton 1988
Party	Candidate	Votes	%	±%
Labour	D. Cosstick	1,207	53.7	
Conservative	D. Pollard	915	40.7	
SLD	Ms. A. Gribble	127	5.6	
Turnout		2,249	39.7	
Labour gain from Conservative		Swing		

=== Eastgate ===
Eastgate 1988
Party	Candidate	Votes	%	±%
Labour	T. Martin	1,364	57.5	
Conservative	P. Scannell	808	34.0	
SLD	S. Gribble	202	8.5	
Turnout		2,374	42.1	
Labour hold		Swing		

=== Hucclecote ===
Hucclecote 1988
Party	Candidate	Votes	%	±%
Conservative	C.* Pullon	1,562	49.3	
SLD	S. O'Connor	1,002	31.6	
Labour	Ms. A. Masters	606	19.1	
Turnout		3,170	50.1	
Conservative hold		Swing		

=== Kingsholm ===
Kingsholm 1988
Party	Candidate	Votes	%	±%
SLD	Ms. M. Gould	1,721	53.1	
Conservative	B. Hamblett	1,245	38.4	
Labour	S. Russell	277	8.5	
Turnout		3,243	51.0	
SLD hold		Swing		

=== Linden ===
Linden 1988
Party	Candidate	Votes	%	±%
Labour	G. Phillips	1,004	43.1	
Conservative	D. James	999	42.9	
SLD	A. Gribble	324	13.9	
Turnout		2,327	41.4	
Labour gain from Conservative		Swing		

=== Longlevens ===
Longlevens 1988
Party	Candidate	Votes	%	±%
Conservative	J. Neary	1,595	55.1	
Labour	B. Richards	971	33.5	
SLD	J. Goodwin	330	11.4	
Turnout		2,896	45.1	
Conservative hold		Swing		

=== Matson ===
Matson 1988
Party	Candidate	Votes	%	±%
Labour	J.* Holmes	955	53.9	
Conservative	N. Ravenhill	893	35.3	
SLD	G. Phillips	190	7.5	
Turnout		2,038	41.5	
Labour hold		Swing		

=== Podsmead ===
Podsmead 1988
Party	Candidate	Votes	%	±%
SLD	Ms. C. Vaughan	1,210	43.9	
Conservative	Ms. E. Orr	970	35.2	
Labour	Ms. C. Wood	578	21.0	
Turnout		2,758	46.1	
SLD hold		Swing		

=== Tuffley ===
Tuffley 1988
Party	Candidate	Votes	%	±%
Labour	A. Meredith	1,443	48.2	
Conservative	Ms. J. Bracey	1,346	45.0	
SLD	Ms. J. Cole	205	6.8	
Turnout		2,994	48.1	
Labour gain from Conservative		Swing		

=== Westgate ===
Westgate 1988
Party	Candidate	Votes	%	±%
SLD	P. Aplin	1,102	46.6	
Conservative	C.* Fudge	899	38.0	
Labour	A. Francis	365	15.4	
Turnout		2,366	44.6	
SLD gain from Conservative		Swing		
