= 1988 Tweeddale District Council election =

1988 Scottish local government election

← 1984	5 May 1988	1992 →

All 10 seats to Tweeddale District Council 6 seats needed for a majority
	First party	Second party
Party	Independent	SNP
Last election	10 seats, 100.0%	Did not contest
Seats won	7	1
Seat change	▼3	▲1
Popular vote	2,729	988
Percentage	56.4%	20.4%
Swing	▼43.6%	New
	Third party	Fourth party
Party	Labour	Conservative
Last election	Did not contest	Did not contest
Seats won	1	1
Seat change	▲1	▲1
Popular vote	819	304
Percentage	16.9%	6.3%
Swing	New	New

Elections to Tweeddale District Council took place on 5 May 1988, alongside elections to the councils of Scotland's various other districts.

== Results ==
1988 Tweeddale District Council election result
Party	Seats	Gains	Losses	Net gain/loss	Seats %	Votes %	Votes	+/−
Independent	7	0	3	▼3	70.0	56.4	2,729	▼43.6
SNP	1	1	0	▲1	10.0	20.4	988	New
Labour	1	1	0	▲1	10.0	16.9	819	New
Conservative	1	1	0	▲1	10.0	6.3	304	New
