= 1988 Inverclyde District Council election =

1988 Scottish local government election

| ← 1984 | 5 May 1988 | 1992 → |

All 20 Seats to Inverclyde District District Council 11 seats needed for a majority
| | First party | Second party | Third party |
|---|---|---|---|
| Party | Labour | SSLD | Conservative |
| Last election | 11 seats, 49.2% | 9 seats, 42.8% | 0 seats, 4.8% |
| Seats won | 12 | 7 | 1 |
| Seat change | ▲1 | ▼2 | ▲1 |
| Popular vote | 17,643 | 13,723 | 2,660 |
| Percentage | 45.4% | 35.3% | 6.8% |
| Swing | ▼3.8% | ▼7.5% | ▲2.0% |

The 1988 Inverclyde District Council election was held on 5 May 1988 alongside the local elections taking place all over Scotland.

== Results ==
1988 Inverclyde District Council election result
| Party | Seats | Gains | Losses | Net gain/loss | Seats % | Votes % | Votes | +/− |
|---|---|---|---|---|---|---|---|---|
| Labour | 12 | 1 | 0 | ▲1 | 60.0 | 45.4 | 17,643 | ▼3.8 |
| SSLD | 7 | 1 | 3 | ▼2 | 35.0 | 35.3 | 13,723 | ▼7.5 |
| Conservative | 1 | 1 | 0 | ▲1 | 5.0 | 6.8 | 2,660 | ▲2.0 |
| SNP | 0 | 0 | 0 | Steady | 0.0 | 12.4 | 4,809 | ▲9.2 |
