= 1988 Perth and Kinross District Council election =

1988 Scottish local government election

Conservatives took the most seats, but did not gain an overall majority

The 1988 Perth and Kinross District Council election took place on 5 May 1988, alongside elections to the councils of Scotland's various other districts. The number of seats and the total vote share won by each party is listed below.

== Results ==
1988 Perth and Kinross District Council election
| Party | Seats | Gains | Losses | Net gain/loss | Seats % | Votes % | Votes | +/− |
|---|---|---|---|---|---|---|---|---|
| Conservative | 12 | | | ▼2 | 41.4 | 40.0 | 19,456 | ▼3.1 |
| SNP | 8 | | | ▲7 | 27.6 | 30.9 | 15,037 | ▲19.3 |
| Labour | 5 | | | ▼1 | 17.2 | 13.8 | 6,693 | ▼6.0 |
| SSLD | 2 | | | ▼2 | 6.9 | 9.2 | 4,445 | ▼11.7 |
| Independent | 2 | | | ▼2 | 6.9 | 5.0 | 2,422 | ▲0.5 |
| Ind. Lib Dem | 0 | 0 | 0 | Steady | 0.0 | 1.2 | 602 | New |
| SDP | 0 | 0 | 0 | Steady | 0.0 | 0.2 | 87 | New |

Voter turnout was 51.8%.
