= 1988 Banff and Buchan District Council election =

District-level election in Scotland

- 5 May 1988

All 18 seats to Banff and Buchan District Council 10 seats needed for a majority
- Turnout: 42.9%
	First party	Second party
Party	Independent	SNP
Last election	12 seats, 55.5%	5 seats, 25.0%
Seats won	10	8
Seat change	▼2	▲3
Popular vote	12,002	12,587
Percentage	44.5%	46.7%
Swing	▼11.0%	▲21.7%
- Map of ward results

- Council composition following the election

Elections to Banff and Buchan Council were held on 5 May 1988, on the same day as the other Scottish local government elections. This was the fifth election to the district council following the implementation of the Local Government (Scotland) Act 1973.

The election used the 18 wards created by the Initial Statutory Reviews of Electoral Arrangements in 1980. Each ward elected one councillor using first-past-the-post voting.

== Results ==
1988 Banff and Buchan District Council election result
Party	Seats	Gains	Losses	Net gain/loss	Seats %	Votes %	Votes	+/−
Independent	10	1	3	▼2	55.6	44.5	12,002	▼11.0
SNP	8	3	0	▲3	44.4	46.7	12,587	▲21.7
Labour	0	0	0	Steady	0.0	5.7	1,532	▼5.0
SSLD	0	0	0	Steady	0.0	2.3	612	▲0.9
Conservative	0	0	1	▼1	0.0	1.0	262	▼6.5
