= 1988 Berwickshire District Council election =

1988 Scottish local government election

The Conservatives took the most seats and won an overall majority

Elections to the Berwickshire District Council took place in May 1988, alongside elections to the councils of Scotland's various other districts. The number of seats and the total vote share won by each party is listed below.

Conservative: 9 seats, 56.6%
Liberal Democrats: 1 seat, 15.6%
Independent: 1 seat, 16.8%
SNP: 0 seats, 5.4%
Other Parties: 0 seats, 10.0%
