= 1988 Angus District Council election =

1988 Scottish local government election

The 1988 Angus District Council election took place on the 5 May 1988 to elect members of Angus District Council, as part of that year's Scottish local elections.

== Election results ==
Angus District Election Result 1988
Party	Seats	Gains	Losses	Net gain/loss	Seats %	Votes %	Votes	+/−
SNP	13	+3	-1	+2		45.4	16,916	+3.3
Conservative	6			-2		32.5	11,024	-5.6
Labour	0	0	0	0	0.0	9.8	3,302	-0.8
Independent	2	0	-2	-2		4.3	1,455	-2.8
SLD	1	1	0	+1		1.4	1,296	-0.6

== Ward results ==
Harbour
Party	Candidate	Votes	%	±%
SNP	A. King	703	55.1	−3.7
Conservative	D. H. Beattie	430	33.7	+3.9
Labour	I. McFatridge	143	11.2	−0.6
Majority		273		
Turnout			46.5	

Brothock
Party	Candidate	Votes	%	±%
SNP	I. J. Angus	1,295	64.6	+9.7
Conservative	Ms. J. Sanderson	357	17.8	+2.9
Labour	A. Ferguson	352	17.5	−9.8
Majority		938		
Turnout			47.4	−4.9
SNP hold		Swing		

Timmergreens and Elms
Party	Candidate	Votes	%	±%
SNP	C. S. B. Meldrum	973	60.7	+14.5
Conservative	A. Watson	341	21.3	−2.9
Labour	A. J. Stuart	280	18.0	−9.9
Majority		632		
Turnout			47.7	−0.5
SNP hold		Swing		

Arbirlot/Hospitalfield
Party	Candidate	Votes	%	±%
Conservative	Ms. E. C. Hill	840	56.2	−2.4
SNP	G. Haddon	579	39.8	+16.3
Labour	W. J. Irving	74	5.0	+0.6
Majority		261		
Turnout			48.8	+8.9

Marywell/Cliffburn
Party	Candidate	Votes	%	±%
SNP	Ms S. M. Welsh	972	64.1	+4.0
Conservative	P. J. Farquhar	333	22.0	−0.1
Labour	M. G. Law	210	13.8	−4.0
Majority		639		
Turnout			44.9	+2.9
SNP hold		Swing		

Colliston/Hayshead
Party	Candidate	Votes	%	±%
SNP	B. M. C. Milne	866	50.6	+1.6
Conservative	J. A. G. McIntosh	401	23.4	+0.7
Labour	F. G. Pearson	287	16.8	−11.4
SLD	R. B. Spiers	156	9.1	+9.1
Majority		465		
Turnout			49.8	+5.5
SNP hold		Swing		

Carnoustie East
Party	Candidate	Votes	%	±%
Conservative	J. A. McAdam	1,221	49.4	−9.2
SNP	C. Lockhart	1,049	42.4	+11.8
Labour	K. W. Bruce	117	4.7	−6.0
SLD	Ms. R. G. Monaghan	85	3.4	+3.4
Majority		172		
Turnout			50.2	+4.6

Carnoustie West and Panmure
Party	Candidate	Votes	%	±%
SNP	Ms. R. Lamont	932	52.0	+17.2
Conservative	J. Gray	682	38.1	−11.2
Labour	M. Dodgson	177	9.9	−5.7
Majority		250		
Turnout			44.9	+1.8
SNP gain from Conservative		Swing		

Forfar Central/Lemno
Party	Candidate	Votes	%	±%
Conservative	Ms. A. E. D. Thomson	1,020	52.1	−2.6
SNP	D. Miller	826	42.4	−2.7
Labour	G. McKenzie	109	5.6	+5.6
Majority		194		
Turnout			48.1	
Conservative hold		Swing		

Dunnichen
Party	Candidate	Votes	%	±%
SNP	G. Suttie	1,155	61.1	+8.9
Conservative	D. Lumgair	734	38.8	−8.6
Majority		421		
Turnout			49.3	+7.2
SNP hold		Swing		

Montrose North
Party	Candidate	Votes	%	±%
Independent	G. Norrie	862	57.4	−22.9
Conservative	Ms. E. Lamb	413	27.5	+27.5
Labour	T. Bruce	224	14.9	+14.9
Majority		449		
Turnout			44.4	+5.6

Hillside
Party	Candidate	Votes	%	±%
SNP	Ms. K. M. Ritchie	750	45.1	−2.7
Conservative	Ms. D. M. Munro	541	32.5	−1.3
Labour	F. Wood	369	22.2	+4.1
Majority		209		
Turnout			46.8	+10.8
SNP hold		Swing		

Kirriemuir
Party	Candidate	Votes	%	±%
SLD	W. Doig	917	50.5	+50.5
SNP	I. Martin	893	49.2	−2.8
Majority		24		
Turnout			43.0	−4.5
SLD gain from SNP		Swing		

Western Glens
Party	Candidate	Votes	%	±%
Conservative	Ms. R. Dundas	525	63.4	+63.4
SNP	Ms. A. M. Mann	303	36.6	+36.6
Majority		222		
Turnout			48.2%	

Eastern Glens
Party	Candidate	Votes	%	±%
Conservative	David Myles	375	67.2	−0.4
SNP	H. T. Skinner	178	31.8	+14.2
Majority		197		
Turnout			48.3	−0.9

Langlands
Party	Candidate	Votes	%	±%
SNP	Ian Hudghton	1,070	67.5	+67.5
Conservative	C. A. W. Brown	371	23.4	+23.4
Labour	I. C. Cairns	144	9.1	+9.1
Majority		699		
Turnout			46.6	

Westfield Dean
Party	Candidate	Votes	%	±%
SNP	A. E. Thomson	1,121	64.1	+9.1
Conservative	Ms. J. B. McMillan	624	35.7	−9.1
Majority		497		
Turnout			50.7	+10.1

Montrose South
Party	Candidate	Votes	%	±%
SNP	H. Stewart	635	42.1	+14.7
Independent	W. M. Philips	593	39.3	−1.4
Labour	K. Nicoll	140	9.3	+9.3
SLD	P. J. Stevens	138	9.1	+0.8
Majority		42		
Turnout			42.3	
SNP gain from Independent		Swing		

Lunan
Party	Candidate	Votes	%	±%
SNP	A. C. W. Forsyth	783	48.4	+48.4
Conservative	R. O. Harris	712	44.0	−17.5
Labour	Ms. J. R. Anderson	123	7.6	+7.6
Majority		71		
Turnout			46.9	+9.3
SNP gain from Conservative		Swing		

Brechin North
Party	Candidate	Votes	%	±%
Conservative	A. Buchan	846	44.6	−9.3
SNP	R. D. Cameron	824	43.4	+7.7
Labour	Ms. J. McFatridge	224	11.8	+1.8
Majority		22		
Turnout			53.8	+6.4
Conservative hold		Swing		

Brechin South
Party	Candidate	Votes	%	±%
SNP	J. Thomson	1,009	63.6	−5.4
Labour	Anne Begg	320	20.2	+8.3
Conservative	Ms M. M. C. Brymer	258	16.3	−2.6
Majority		689		
Turnout			51.9	+4.8
SNP hold		Swing		
