= 1988 West Lothian District Council election =

1988 Scottish local government election

- 5 May 1988

All 24 seats to West Lothian District Council 13 seats needed for a majority
- Turnout: 49.0%
	First party	Second party
Party	Labour	SNP
Last election	19 seats, 56.1%	2 seats, 24.1%
Seats won	14	7
Seat change	▼5	▲5
Popular vote	22,921	18,765
Percentage	47.0%	38.5%
Swing	▼9.1%	▲14.4%
	Third party	Fourth party
Party	Independent	Ind. Ratepayers
Last election	1 seat, 4.8%	1 seats, 4.6%
Seats won	2	1
Seat change	▲1	▼1
Popular vote	1,745	1,137
Percentage	3.2%	2.4%
Swing	▼1.6%	▼2.2%
- Map of ward results

- Council composition following the election

Elections to West Lothian District Council were held on 5 May 1988, on the same day as the other Scottish local government elections. This was the fifth election to the district council following the implementation of the Local Government (Scotland) Act 1973.

The election used the 24 wards created by the Initial Statutory Reviews of Electoral Arrangements in 1980. Each ward elected one councillor using first-past-the-post voting.

== Results ==
1988 West Lothian District Council election result
Party	Seats	Gains	Losses	Net gain/loss	Seats %	Votes %	Votes	+/−
Labour	14	0	5	▼5	58.3	47.0	22,921	▼9.1
SNP	7	5	0	▲5	29.2	38.5	18,765	▲14.4
Independent	2	1	0	▲1	8.3	3.2	1,745	▼1.6
Ind. Ratepayers	1	0	1	▼1	4.1	2.4	1,137	▼2.2
Conservative	0	0	0	Steady	0.0	8.6	4,171	▲2.3
SDP	0	0	0	Steady	0.0	0.3	118	New
