= 1988 Falkirk District Council election =

1988 Scottish local government election

- 5 May 1988

All 36 seats to Falkirk District Council 19 seats needed for a majority
	First party	Second party	Third party
Party	Labour	SNP	Conservative
Last election	25 seats, 52.8%	7 seats, 31.4%	2 seats, 8.9%
Seats won	20	10	3
Seat change	▼5	▲3	▲1
Popular vote	25,747	18,570	4,302
Percentage	48.8%	35.2%	8.2%
Swing	▼4.0%	▲3.8%	▼0.7%
	Fourth party	Fifth party
Party	Independent	Independent Labour
Last election	2 seats, 4.1%	0 seats, 0.9%
Seats won	2	1
Seat change	Steady	▲1
Popular vote	2,301	725
Percentage	4.4%	1.4%
Swing	▲0.3%	▲0.5%
- Composition of District Council after the election

Elections to the Falkirk District Council took place on 5 May 1988, alongside elections to the councils of Scotland's various other districts.

== Results ==
1988 Falkirk District Council election result
Party	Seats	Gains	Losses	Net gain/loss	Seats %	Votes %	Votes	+/−
Labour	20	1	6	▼5	55.6	48.8	25,747	▼4.0
SNP	10	3	0	▲3	27.8	35.2	18,570	▲3.8
Conservative	3	1	0	▲1	8.3	8.2	4,302	▼0.7
Independent	2	1	1	Steady	5.6	4.4	2,301	▲0.3
Independent Labour	1	1	0	▲1	2.8	1.4	725	▲0.5
Denny, Dunnipace Non-Party Group	0	0	0	Steady	0.0	2.1	1,108	New
