= 1988 Ross and Cromarty District Council election =

1988 Scottish local government election

| ← 1984 | 5 May 1988 | 1992 → |

All 22 seats to Ross and Cromarty District Council 12 seats needed for a majority

| | First party | Second party | Third party |
|---|---|---|---|
| Party | Independent | Labour | SNP |
| Seats won | 18 | 2 | 1 |
| Seat change | 0 | 0 | ▲1 |
| Popular vote | 4,699 | 528 | 1,224 |
| Percentage | 67.3% | 7.9% | 18.6% |
| Swing | ▼1.3% | ▼10.4% | ▲18.6% |
| | Fourth party |
| Party | Conservative |
| Seats won | 1 |
| Seat change | 0 |
| Popular vote | 0 |
| Percentage | 0.0% |
| Swing | ▼13.1% |
Council Control before election
Independent
Council Control after election
Independent

Independents gained a majority of the seats, giving them control of the council

Elections to the Ross and Cromarty District Council took place in May 1988, alongside elections to the councils of Scotland's various other districts.

== Election results ==
Ross and Cromarty District Council Election Result 1988
| Party | Seats | Gains | Losses | Net gain/loss | Seats % | Votes % | Votes | +/− |
|---|---|---|---|---|---|---|---|---|
| Independent | 18 | | | 0 | | 67.3 | 4,699 | ▼1.3 |
| Labour | 2 | | | 0 | | 7.9 | 528 | ▼10.4 |
| SNP | 1 | | | ▲1 | | 18.6 | 1,224 | New |
| Conservative | 1 | | | 0 | | 0 | 0 | ▼13.1 |
| Green | 0 | | | 0 | | 4.4 | 293 | New |
| Liberal Democrats | 0 | | | 0 | | 2.0 | 128 | New |
