= 1988 Strathkelvin District Council election =

1988 Scottish local government election

The 1988 Strathkelvin District Council election was held on 5 May 1988, alongside elections to the councils of Scotland's various other districts.

== Results ==
1988 Strathkelvin District Council election result
Party	Seats	Gains	Losses	Net gain/loss	Seats %	Votes %	Votes	+/−
Labour	12	1	0	▲1	80.0	48.9	14,628	
Conservative	2	0	2	▼2	13.3	22.5	6,737	
SSLD	1	1	0	▲1	6.7	12.6	3,755	
SNP	0	0	0	Steady	0.0	16.0	4,785	
