= 1988 Cheltenham Borough Council election =

Cheltenham Borough Council election

The 1988 Cheltenham Council election took place on 5 May 1988 to elect members of Cheltenham Borough Council in Gloucestershire, England. One third of the council was up for election. The Conservatives made a net gain of one seat, which left them one seat short of a majority, meaning the council stayed in no overall control.

After the election, the composition of the council was

- Conservative 16
- Social and Liberal Democrats 14
- Labour 2
- Residents Associations 1

== Election result ==
Cheltenham local election result 1988
Party	Seats	Gains	Losses	Net gain/loss	Seats %	Votes %	Votes	+/−
SLD	6	1	1	-	54.5	43.4	12,666	+4.8
Conservative	4	2	1	+1	36.4	42.6	12,414	-1.6
Labour	1	0	0	-	9.1	13.4	3,901	+1.9
Green	0	0	0	-	0.0	0.6	187	N/A
Residents	0	0	1	-1	0.0	0.0	0	-5.7

== Ward results ==
All Saints
Party	Candidate	Votes	%	±%
SLD	Stephen Jordan*	1,324	49.2	+8.4
Conservative	Nigel Ferriman Lowe	1,038	38.6	−9.2
Labour	Diana Hale	330	12.3	+0.9
Majority		286	10.6	
Turnout		2,692	39.83	
SLD hold		Swing		

Charlton Kings
Party	Candidate	Votes	%	±%
Conservative	William Todman	1,733	51.3	+13.3
SLD	Barrie Anderson	1,449	42.9	+8.2
Labour	Malcolm Perry	194	5.7	+1.5
Majority		284	8.4	
Turnout		3,376	52.73	
Conservative gain from Residents		Swing		

College
Party	Candidate	Votes	%	±%
Conservative	Leslie Freeman	2,034	57.2	+1.2
SLD	Philip Gray*	1,520	42.8	+3.4
Majority		514	14.4	
Turnout		3,554	50.76	
Conservative gain from SLD		Swing		

Hatherley
Party	Candidate	Votes	%	±%
SLD	Jeremy Whales*	1,454	50.2	+7.6
Conservative	Jonathan Dubow	1,160	40.0	−9.3
Labour	Andrew Palmer	284	9.8	+1.7
Majority		294	10.2	
Turnout		2,898	43.44	
SLD hold		Swing		

Hesters Way
Party	Candidate	Votes	%	±%
SLD	David Brereton	1,251	47.5	−1.7
Conservative	Harry Turbyfield*	897	34.1	N/A
Labour	Ian White	486	18.5	+3.1
Majority		354	13.4	
Turnout		2,634	36.51	
SLD gain from Conservative		Swing		

Lansdown
Party	Candidate	Votes	%	±%
Conservative	Robert Wilson	1,299	57.9	−1.1
SLD	Mary Clarkson	681	30.4	−0.8
Labour	Linda Stapleton	262	11.7	+2.0
Majority		618	27.5	
Turnout		2,242	36.65	
Conservative hold		Swing		

Park
Party	Candidate	Votes	%	±%
Conservative	William Bullingham*	1,589	56.8	−2.9
SLD	Christopher Morris	1,079	38.6	+2.9
Labour	Jeremy Windust	130	4.6	+0.1
Majority		510	18.2	
Turnout		2,798	49.09	
Conservative hold		Swing		

Pittville
Party	Candidate	Votes	%	±%
Labour	James Pennington*	1,032	38.3	+5.7
Conservative	Timothy Paterson	853	31.7	−7.8
SLD	Andrew McKinlay	622	23.1	−4.8
Green	Alan Wadley	187	6.9	−21.0
Majority		179	6.6	
Turnout		2,694	44.00	
Labour hold		Swing		

St Mark's
Party	Candidate	Votes	%	±%
SLD	Alexis Cassin*	1,222	61.2	+6.4
Conservative	Roger Wookey	428	21.4	−8.0
Labour	Michael Luker	346	17.3	+1.5
Majority		794	39.8	
Turnout		1,996	34.90	
SLD hold		Swing		

St Paul's
Party	Candidate	Votes	%	±%
SLD	Paul Baker*	1,267	57.9	+16.2
Conservative	Kenneth Burke	626	28.6	−19.8
Labour	William Evans	295	13.5	+3.6
Majority		641	29.2	
Turnout		2,188	38.20	
SLD hold		Swing		

St Peter's
Party	Candidate	Votes	%	±%
SLD	Gilbert Wakeley*	797	38.0	+8.1
Conservative	Nigel Ball	757	36.1	−16.4
Labour	Julian Dunkerton	542	25.9	+8.3
Majority		40	1.9	
Turnout		2,096	36.13	
SLD hold		Swing		
