= 1988 Roxburgh District Council election =

1988 Scottish local government election

| ← 1984 | 5 May 1988 | 1992 → |

All 16 seats to Roxburgh District Council 9 seats needed for a majority
| | First party | Second party | Third party |
|---|---|---|---|
| Party | Independent | SNP | Conservative |
| Last election | 7 seats, 44.2% | Did not contest | 5 seats, 13.6% |
| Seats won | 11 | 2 | 1 |
| Seat change | ▲4 | ▲2 | ▼4 |
| Popular vote | 4,794 | 1,431 | 2,106 |
| Percentage | 53.3% | 15.9% | 23.4% |
| Swing | ▼13.6% | New | ▲9.8% |
| | Fourth party | Fifth party |
| Party | SSLD | Moderates |
| Last election | 4 seats, 42.1% | Did not contest |
| Seats won | 1 | 1 |
| Seat change | ▼3 | ▲1 |
| Popular vote | 335 | 332 |
| Percentage | 3.7% | 3.7% |
| Swing | ▼38.4% | New |
- Composition of District Council after the election

Elections to the Roxburgh District Council took place on 5 May 1988, alongside elections to the councils of Scotland's various other districts.

== Results ==
1988 Roxburgh District Council election result
| Party | Seats | Gains | Losses | Net gain/loss | Seats % | Votes % | Votes | +/− |
|---|---|---|---|---|---|---|---|---|
| Independent | 11 | | | ▲4 | 68.8 | 53.3 | 4,794 | ▲9.1 |
| SNP | 2 | | | ▲2 | 12.5 | 15.9 | 1,431 | New |
| Conservative | 1 | | | ▼4 | 6.3 | 23.4 | 2,106 | ▲9.8 |
| SSLD | 1 | | | ▼3 | 6.3 | 3.7 | 335 | ▼38.4 |
| Moderates | 1 | | | ▲1 | 6.3 | 3.7 | 332 | New |
