= 1988 Dumbarton District Council election =

1988 Scottish local government election

- 5 May 1988

All 16 seats to Dumbarton District Council 9 seats needed for a majority
	First party	Second party
Party	Labour	Conservative
Last election	11 seats	2 seats
Seats won	7	4
Seat change	▼4	▲2
Popular vote	11,997	7,478
Percentage	38.5%	24.0%
	Third party	Fourth party
Party	SNP	Independent
Last election	0 seats	2 seats
Seats won	3	2
Seat change	▲3	Steady
Popular vote	7,098	2,959
Percentage	22.8%	9.5%

The 1988 Dumbarton District Council election took place on 5 May 1988, alongside elections to the councils of Scotland's various other districts. Each of the 16 wards elected a single member using the first-past-the-post voting system.

== Results ==
1988 Dumbarton District Council election result
Party	Seats	Gains	Losses	Net gain/loss	Seats %	Votes %	Votes	+/−
Labour	7	0	4	▼4	43.8	38.5	11,997	
Conservative	4	2	0	▲2	25.0	24.0	7,478	
SNP	3	3	0	▲3	18.8	22.8	7,098	
Independent	2	0	0	Steady	12.5	9.5	2,959	
SDP	0	0	0	Steady	0.0	3.1	968	
SSLD	0	0	1	▼1	0.0	1.8	573	
Independent Labour	0	0	0	Steady	0.0	0.2	69	
