= 1988 Kincardine and Deeside District Council election =

1988 Scottish local government election

- 5 May 1988

All 12 seats to Kincardine and Deeside District Council 7 seats needed for a majority
- Turnout: 42.4%
	First party	Second party
Party	Independent	SSLD
Last election	7 seats, 53.2%	1 seat, 18.3%
Seats won	6	3
Seat change	▼1	▲2
Popular vote	6,358	3,009
Percentage	45.0%	21.3%
Swing	▼8.2%	▲3.0%
	Third party	Fourth party
Party	Conservative	SNP
Last election	3 seats, 26.3%	1 seat, 2.2%
Seats won	2	1
Seat change	▼1	Steady
Popular vote	2,056	1,574
Percentage	14.6%	11.1%
Swing	▼11.7%	▲8.9%
- Map of ward results

- Council composition following the election

Elections to Kincardine and Deeside District Council were held on 5 May 1988, on the same day as the other Scottish local government elections. This was the fifth election to the district council following the implementation of the Local Government (Scotland) Act 1973.

The election used the 12 wards created by the Initial Statutory Reviews of Electoral Arrangements in 1980. Each ward elected one councillor using first-past-the-post voting.

== Results ==
1988 Kincardine and Deeside District Council election result
Party	Seats	Gains	Losses	Net gain/loss	Seats %	Votes %	Votes	+/−
Independent	6	2	3	▼1	50.0	45.0	6,358	▼8.2
SSLD	3	3	1	▲2	25.0	21.3	3,009	▲3.0
Conservative	2	1	2	▼1	16.7	14.6	2,056	▼11.7
SNP	1	0	0	Steady	8.3	11.1	1,574	▲8.9
Labour	0	0	0	Steady	0.0	8.0	1,131	New
