= 1988 Caithness District Council election =

1988 Scottish local government election

← 1984	5 May 1988	1992 →

Party	Independent	Labour Party	Independent Liberal
Popular vote	2,115	179	0
Percentage	92.5%	7.5%	0.0%
Council Convener before election
John Young
Independent
Council Convener after election
John Young
Independent

Map showing the results of the 1988 Caithness District Council election. Independents maintained a majority of the seats.

Elections to the Caithness District Council took place in May 1988, alongside elections to the other district councils in Scotland.

Sixteen seats were contested, with Independent candidates winning a large majority.

== Aggregate results ==
Caithness District Council election result, 1988
Party	Seats	Gains	Losses	Net gain/loss	Seats %	Votes %	Votes	+/−
Independent	13			▼1	81.3	92.5	2,115	▼7.5
Labour	2			▲2	12.5	7.5	179	New
Independent Liberal	1			▲1	6.3	0.0	0	New
