= 1988 Annandale and Eskdale District Council election =

1988 Scottish local government election

← 1984	5 May 1988	1992 →

All 16 seats to Annandale and Eskadale District Council 9 seats needed for a majority
- Turnout: 47.1%
	First party	Second party	Third party
Party	SSLD	Independent	Labour
Last election	4 seats, 26.3%	12 seats, 55.6%	0 seats, 10.8%
Seats won	8	6	2
Seat change	▲4	▼6	▲2
Popular vote	3,304	3,437	1,467
Percentage	37.7%	39.2%	16.8%
Swing	▲11.4%	▼16.4%	▲6.0%
- Composition of District Council after the election

The 1988 Annandale and Eskdale District Council election took place on 5 May 1988, alongside elections to the councils of Scotland's various other districts.

== Results ==
1988 Annandale and Eskdale District Council election result
Party	Seats	Gains	Losses	Net gain/loss	Seats %	Votes %	Votes	+/−
SSLD	8	4	0	▲4	50.0	37.7	3,304	▲11.4
Independent	6	0	6	▼6	37.5	39.2	3,437	▼16.4
Labour	2	2	0	▲2	12.5	16.7	1,467	▲5.9
SNP	0	0	0	Steady	0.0	3.9	337	▼3.4
Green	0	0	0	Steady	0.0	1.3	117	New
Conservative	0	0	0	Steady	0.0	1.1	108	New
