= 1988 East Lothian District Council election =

1988 Scottish local government election

Elections for the East Lothian Council took place in May 1988, alongside elections to the councils of Scotland's various other districts.

== Ward results ==
=== Labour ===
- Musselburgh East
- Musselburgh Central
- Musselburgh South
- Musselburgh West
- Tranent/Ormiston
- Carberry
- Prestonpans West
- Cockenzie
- Prestonpans East
- Gladsmuir
- Lammermuir
- Dunbar

=== Conservative ===
- Haddington
- Direleton
- East Linton
- North Berwick

=== Independent Labour ===
- Tranent North
