= 1988 Lochaber District Council election =

1988 Scottish local government election

- 5 May 1988

All 15 seats to Lochaber District Council 8 seats needed for a majority

| | First party | Second party | Third party |
|---|---|---|---|
| Party | Independent | Labour | Independent Labour |
| Seats won | 8 | 4 | 3 |
| Seat change | 0 | ▼1 | ▲1 |
| Popular vote | 1,670 | 1,448 | 802 |
| Percentage | 40.4% | 35.0% | 19.4% |
| Swing | ▼18.1% | ▲18.0% | ▲0.9% |
Council Control before election
Independent
Council Control after election
Independent

Independents gained a majority of the seats, giving them control of the council

Elections to the Lochaber District Council took place in May 1988, alongside elections to the councils of Scotland's various other districts. The number of seats and the total vote share won by each party is listed below.

Independent: 8 seats, 40.4%
Labour: 4 seats, 35.0%
Independent Labour: 3 seats, 19.4%
SNP: 0 seats, 5.4%

Voter turnout was 53.9%.
