= 1988 Sutherland District Council election =

1988 Scottish local government election

← 1984	5 May 1988	1992 →

All 14 seats to Sutherland District Council 8 seats needed for a majority
	First party
Party	Independent
Seats won	14
Seat change	0
Popular vote	1,022
Percentage	91.3%
Swing	▼8.7%
Council Control before election
Independent
Council Control after election
Independent

Independents gained a majority of the seats, giving them control of the council

Elections to the Sutherland District Council took place in May 1988, alongside elections to the councils of Scotland's various other districts. Only three seats were contested and one received no nominations.

== Aggregate results ==
Caithness District Election Result 1988
Party	Seats	Gains	Losses	Net gain/loss	Seats %	Votes %	Votes	+/−
Independent	14	0	0	0	100.0	91.3	1,022	▼8.7
Independent Green	0	0	0	0	0.0	8.7	97	New
