= 1988 Stewartry District Council election =

Election in Stewartry, Dumfries and Galloway, Scotland

Independents took all of the seats, and therefore won an overall majority

Elections to the Stewartry District Council took place in May 1988, alongside elections to the councils of Scotland's various other districts. The number of seats and the total vote share won by each party is listed below.

Independent: 12 seats, 90.4%
Other Parties: 0 seats, 9.6%
