= 1988 Inverness District Council election =

1988 Scottish local government election

← 1984	5 May 1988	1992 →

All 28 seats to Inverness District Council 15 seats needed for a majority

	First party	Second party	Third party
Party	Independent	Labour	Liberal Democrats
Seats won	14	12	2
Seat change	▼4	▲4	0
Popular vote	4,865	2,924	732
Percentage	51.1%	30.7%	7.7%
Swing	▼10.2%	▲2.9%	▲1.1%
Council Control before election
Independent
Council Control after election
Independent

Independents took the most seats but fell short of an overall majority

Elections to the Inverness District Council took place in May 1988, alongside elections to the councils of Scotland's various other districts.

Caithness District Election Result 1988
Party	Seats	Gains	Losses	Net gain/loss	Seats %	Votes %	Votes	+/−
Independent	14			▼4	50.0	51.1	4,865	▼10.2
Labour	12			▲4		30.7	2,924	▲2.9
Liberal Democrats	2			0		7.7	732	▲1.1
SNP	0			0	0.0	7.7	751	New
Green	0			0	0.0	2.8	261	New
