= 1988 North East Fife District Council election =

1988 Scottish local government election

Results by ward.

Elections to North East Fife District Council were held in May 1988, the same day as the other Scottish local government elections.

The Westminster constituency seat covering the same area had been won by the Liberal candidate (and future Liberal Democrat leader) Menzies Campbell from the Conservative Party in the previous year's general election.

== Election results ==
North East Fife District Council Election Result 1988
Party	Seats	Gains	Losses	Net gain/loss	Seats %	Votes %	Votes	+/−
SLD	12	▲2	0	▲2		47.4	13,143	▲2.1
Conservative	4	0	▼2	▼2		34.7	9,613	▼6.6
Independent	2	0	0	0		7.2	1,991	▲0.2
Labour	0	0	0	0		5.4	1,478	▲2.7
SNP	0	0	0	0	0.0	5.4	1,477	▲2.3
Other parties	0	0	0	0	0.0	0.3	80	▼0.2
