= 1988 Broxbourne Borough Council election =

1988 UK local government election

The Broxbourne Council election, 1988 was held to elect council members of the Broxbourne Borough Council, the local government authority of the borough of Broxbourne, Hertfordshire, England.

== Composition of expiring seats before election ==
Ward	Party	Incumbent Elected	Incumbent	Standing again?
Broxbourne	Conservative	1984	Joan Fiddy	No
Bury Green	Labour	1984	Chris Robbins	No
Cheshunt Central	Conservative	1987	Milan Milovanovic	Yes
Cheshunt North	Conservative	1984	Gerald Game	Yes
Flamstead End	Conservative	1984	Edna Lazzari	Yes
Goffs Oak	Conservative	1984	Michael Janes	Yes
Hoddesdon North	Conservative	1984	Brian Cunningham	No
Hoddesdon Town	Social and Liberal Democrats	1984	Julian Gould	Yes
Rosedale	Conservative	1984	Thomas Wright	Yes
Rye Park	Labour	1984	Paul Garratt	No
Theobalds	Conservative	1984	Terence Askew	Yes
Waltham Cross North	Conservative	1984	Francis Dolan	Yes
Waltham Cross South	Labour	1984	Martin Hudson	Yes
Wormley & Turnford	Conservative	1984	Eric Martin	Yes (Note: Eric Martin stood in Broxbourne Ward in 1988.)

== Election results ==
Broxbourne local election result 1988
Party	Seats	Gains	Losses	Net gain/loss	Seats %	Votes %	Votes	+/−
Conservative	13	2	0	+2	86.66	61.28	12,685	
Labour	2	0	1	-1	13.34	31.09	6,528	
SLD	0	0	1	-1	0.00	7.63	1,602	

== Results summary ==
An election was held in 14 wards on 5 May 1988.

15 seats were contested (2 seats in Hoddesdon North Ward)

The Conservative Party made 2 gains in Bury Green Ward and Hoddesdon Town Ward at the expense of the Labour Party and the Social & Liberal Democrats respectively.

The political balance of the council following this election was:

- Conservative 36 seats
- Labour 5 seats
- Social and Liberal Democrats 1 Seat

== Ward results ==
Broxbourne Ward Result 5 May 1988
Party	Candidate	Votes	%	±%
Conservative	Eric Martin	1,179	74.15	
SLD	Jeffrey Butler	223	14.03	
Labour	Carl Clifford	188	11.82	
Majority		956		
Turnout		1,590	28.70	
Conservative hold		Swing		

Bury Green Ward Result 5 May 1988
Party	Candidate	Votes	%	±%
Conservative	Hazel Jackson	1,158	53.51	
Labour	John Draper	851	39.33	
SLD	Janet Bonus	155	7.16	
Majority		307		
Turnout		2,164	38.20	
Conservative gain from Labour		Swing		

Cheshunt Central Ward Result 5 May 1988
Party	Candidate	Votes	%	±%
Conservative	Milan Milovanovic	789	66.30	
Labour	Joan Saggs	267	22.44	
SLD	Carolyn Arney	134	11.26	
Majority		522		
Turnout		1,190	32.80	
Conservative hold		Swing		

Cheshunt North Ward Result 5 May 1988
Party	Candidate	Votes	%	±%
Conservative	Gerald Game	909	62.18	
Labour	Mark Bryant	553	37.82	
Majority		356		
Turnout		1,462	30.00	
Conservative hold		Swing		

Flamstead End Ward Result 5 May 1988
Party	Candidate	Votes	%	±%
Conservative	Edna Lazzari	976	62.93	
Labour	Anne Bloomfield	373	24.05	
SLD	Malcolm Aitken	202	13.02	
Majority		603		
Turnout		1,551	32.40	
Conservative hold		Swing		

Goffs Oak Ward Result 5 May 1988
Party	Candidate	Votes	%	±%
Conservative	Michael Janes	891	79.55	
SLD	Trevor Griffiths	117	10.45	
Labour	Christopher Evans	112	10.00	
Majority		774		
Turnout		1,120	32.10	
Conservative hold		Swing		

Hoddesdon North Ward Result 5 May 1988 2 Seats
Party	Candidate	Votes	%	±%
Conservative	Arthur Parkin	1,056	37.45	
Conservative	Paul Chaplow	963	34.14	
SLD	Anthony Fey	285	10.11	
Labour	Jill Garratt	278	9.86	
Labour	Gillian Harvey	238	8.44	
Turnout		2,820	32.90	
Conservative hold		Swing		
Conservative hold		Swing		

Hoddesdon Town Ward Result 5 May 1988
Party	Candidate	Votes	%	±%
Conservative	Kenneth Holliday	930	54.19	
SLD	Julian Gould	505	29.43	
Labour	David May	281	16.38	
Majority		425		
Turnout		1,716	36.00	
Conservative gain from SLD		Swing		

Rosedale Ward Result 5 May 1988
Party	Candidate	Votes	%	±%
Conservative	Thomas Wight	387	49.75	
Labour	John Atkins	278	35.73	
SLD	Peter Huse	113	14.52	
Majority		109		
Turnout		778	29.30	
Conservative hold		Swing		

Rye Park Ward Result 5 May 1988
Party	Candidate	Votes	%	±%
Labour	Neil Harvey	926	51.10	
Conservative	Phyllis Nott	886	48.90	
Majority		40		
Turnout		1,812	39.20	
Labour hold		Swing		

Theobalds Ward Result 5 May 1988
Party	Candidate	Votes	%	±%
Conservative	Terence Askew	687	60.05	
Labour	Marilyn Middlemiss	457	39.95	
Majority		230		
Turnout		1,144		
Conservative hold		Swing		

Waltham Cross North Result 5 May 1988
Party	Candidate	Votes	%	±%
Conservative	Francis Dolan	646	64.60	
Labour	Graham Knight	354	35.40	
Majority		292		
Turnout		1,000	31.50	
Conservative hold		Swing		

Waltham Cross South Ward Result 5 May 1988
Party	Candidate	Votes	%	±%
Labour	Martin Hudson	882	56.47	
Conservative	Mandy Hayward	680	43.53	
Majority		202		
Turnout		1,562	40.60	
Labour hold		Swing		

Wormley / Turnford Ward Result 5 May 1988
Party	Candidate	Votes	%	±%
Conservative	John Morton	728	67.03	
Labour	Roy Wareham	266	24.49	
SLD	Patricia Waughray	92	8.48	
Majority		462		
Turnout		1,086	23.50	
Conservative hold		Swing		
