= 1988 Nairn District Council election =

1988 Scottish local government election

- 5 May 1988

All 10 seats to Nairn District Council 6 seats needed for a majority

| | First party | Second party |
|---|---|---|
| Party | Independent | Conservative |
| Seats won | 9 | 1 |
| Seat change | Steady | ▲1 |
| Popular vote | 1,818 | 263 |
| Percentage | 87.4% | 12.7% |
| Swing | ▲13.3% | New |
Council Control before election
Independent
Council Control after election
Independent

Elections to Nairn District Council were held in May 1988, the same day as the other Scottish local government elections.

Turnout was 48.3% in contested wards. Of the 10 wards, 5 were uncontested.

== Election results ==
Nairn District Council Election Result 1988
| Party | Seats | Gains | Losses | Net gain/loss | Seats % | Votes % | Votes | +/− |
|---|---|---|---|---|---|---|---|---|
| Independent | 9 | 0 | 0 | Steady | 90.0 | 87.4 | 1,818 | ▲13.3 |
| Conservative | 1 | 1 | 0 | ▲1 | 10.0 | 12.7 | 263 | New |
