= 1988 Badenoch and Strathspey District Council election =

1988 Scottish local government election

← 1984	5 May 1988	1992 →

All 10 seats to Badenoch and Strathspey District Council 6 seats needed for a majority

	First party	Second party
Party	Independent	SNP
Seats won	9	1
Seat change	▲1	0
Popular vote	1,479	640
Percentage	69.8%	30.2%
Swing	▲69.8%	▲30.2%
Council Control before election
Independent
Council Control after election
Independent

Elections to the Badenoch and Strathspey District Council took place in May 1988, alongside elections to the councils of Scotland's other districts.

== Aggregate results ==
Badenoch and Strathspey District Election Result 1988
Party	Seats	Gains	Losses	Net gain/loss	Seats %	Votes %	Votes	+/−
Independent	9			▲1	90.0	69.8	1,479	▲69.8
SNP	1			0	10.0	30.2	640	▲30.2
