= 1988 Cumbernauld and Kilsyth District Council election =

1988 Scottish local government election

- 5 May 1988

All 12 seats to Cumbernauld and Kilsyth District Council 7 seats needed for a majority
	First party	Second party
Party	Labour	SNP
Last election	8 seats, 56.3%	4 seats. 37.1%
Seats won	6	6
Seat change	▼2	▲2
Popular vote	12,450	11,553
Percentage	51.5%	47.8%
Swing	▼4.8%	▲10.7%

Elections to Cumbernauld and Kilsyth District Council were held on 5 May 1988, the same day as the other Scottish local government elections.

== Results ==
1988 Cumbernauld and Kilsyth District Council election result
Party	Seats	Gains	Losses	Net gain/loss	Seats %	Votes %	Votes	+/−
Labour	6	0	2	▼2	50.0	51.5	12,450	▼4.8
SNP	6	2	0	▲2	50.0	47.8	11,553	▲10.7
SDP	0	0	0	Steady	0.0	0.6	156	New
