= 1988 Clydesdale District Council election =

1988 Scottish local government election

The 1988 Clydesdale District Council election took place on 5 May 1988, alongside elections to the councils of Scotland's various other districts. Each of the 16 wards elected a single member using the first-past-the-post voting system.

== Results ==
1988 Clydesdale District Council election result
Party	Seats	Gains	Losses	Net gain/loss	Seats %	Votes %	Votes	+/−
Labour	9	4	1	▲3	56.3	45.2	10,822	
SNP	4	2	1	▲1	25.0	28.8	6,892	
Independent	2	1	4	▼3	12.5	8.4	2,003	
Conservative	1	1	0	▲1	6.3	14.2	3,401	
Progressives	0	0	2	▼2	0.0	3.5	843	
