= 1988 Ettrick and Lauderdale District Council election =

1988 Scottish local government election

Independents took the most seats and won an overall majority

Elections to the Ettrick and Lauderdale District Council took place in May 1988, alongside elections to the councils of Scotland's various other districts. The number of seats and the total vote share won by each party is listed below.

Labour: 1 seat, 10.7%
Conservative: 1 seat, 13.1%
SNP: 1 seat, 18.3%
Independent: 13 seats, 58.1%
