= 1988 Nithsdale District Council election =

1988 Scottish local government election

Labour took the most seats, but did not gain an overall majority

The 1988 Nithsdale District Council election took place on 5 May 1988, alongside elections to the councils of Scotland's various other districts.

== Results ==
1988 Nithsdale District Council election result
Party	Seats	Gains	Losses	Net gain/loss	Seats %	Votes %	Votes	+/−
Labour	12				42.9	39.2		
SNP	6				21.4	17.0		
Independent	6				21.4	16.9		
Conservative	4				14.3	25.5		
SSLD	0				0.0	1.7		
