= 1988 Monklands District Council election =

1988 Scottish local government election

The 1988 Monklands District Council election was held on 5 May 1988, alongside elections to the councils of Scotland's various other districts.

== Results ==
1988 Monklands District Council election result
| Party | Seats | Gains | Losses | Net gain/loss | Seats % | Votes % | Votes | +/− |
|---|---|---|---|---|---|---|---|---|
| Labour | 18 | 2 | 2 | Steady | 90.0 | 62.3 | 24,430 | |
| SNP | 2 | 2 | 0 | ▲2 | 10.0 | 26.7 | 10,481 | |
| Conservative | 0 | 0 | 2 | ▼2 | 0.0 | 9.5 | 3,728 | |
| Independent | 0 | 0 | 0 | Steady | 0.0 | 0.9 | 336 | |
| SSLD | 0 | 0 | 0 | Steady | 0.0 | 0.3 | 137 | |
| SDP | 0 | 0 | 0 | Steady | 0.0 | 0.2 | 89 | New |
