= 1988 Wigtown District Council election =

1988 Scottish local government election

Independents gained the most seats, and therefore won an overall majority

The 1988 Wigtown District Council election took place on 5 May 1988, alongside elections to the councils of Scotland's various other districts. The number of seats and the total vote share won by each party is listed below.

== Results ==
1988 Wigtown District Council election result
| Party | Seats | Gains | Losses | Net gain/loss | Seats % | Votes % | Votes | +/− |
|---|---|---|---|---|---|---|---|---|
| Independent | 12 | 0 | 1 | ▼1 | 85.7 | 51.0 | | ▼25.1 |
| SNP | 1 | 0 | 0 | Steady | 7.1 | 20.6 | | ▲9.2 |
| Labour | 1 | 1 | 0 | ▲1 | 7.1 | 8.41 | | ▲0.1 |
| SSLD | 0 | 0 | 0 | Steady | 0.0 | 20.3 | | ▲16.0 |
