= 1988 Eastwood District Council election =

1988 Scottish local government election

Results by ward.

Elections for the Eastwood District Council took place on Thursday 5 May 1988, alongside elections to the councils of Scotland's various other districts.

The Conservatives continued their dominance of the council, winning 49% of the vote and two thirds of the Districts seats.

== Aggregate results ==
The result of the election

Eastwood District Council election, 1988 Turnout: 19,774
Party	Seats	Gains	Losses	Net gain/loss	Seats %	Votes %	Votes	+/−
Conservative	8	0	2	▼2	66.67	48.69	9,627	
Independent	2	0	0	0	16.67	11.86	2,345	
SSLD	1	1	0	▲1	8.33	18.08	3,576	
Labour	1	1	0	▲1	8.33	9.99	1,975	
SNP	0	0	0	0	0.00	6.84	1,353	
SDP	0	0	0	0	0.00	2.81	555	New
Ind. Conservative	0	0	0	0	0.00	1.73	343	New
