= 1988 Argyll and Bute District Council election =

1988 Scottish local government election

← 1984	5 May 1988	1992 →

All 26 seats to Argyll and Bute Council 14 seats needed for a majority
	First party	Second party	Third party
Party	Independent	SNP	Conservative
Seats won	16	3	3
Seat change	▼6	▲2	0
Popular vote	10,956	2,486	2,158
Percentage	57.0%	12.9%	11.2%
Swing	▼18.3%	▲4.3%	▼0.7%
	Fourth party	Fifth party
Party	Liberal Democrats	Labour
Seats won	3	1
Seat change	▲3	▲1
Popular vote	1,898	1,737
Percentage	9.9%	9.0%
Swing	New	▲4.7%
Council Control before election
Independent
Council Control
Independent

Elections to Argyll and Bute Council were held in May 1988, the same day as the other Scottish local government district elections

== Election results ==
Argyll and Bute District Council Election Result 1988
Party	Seats	Gains	Losses	Net gain/loss	Seats %	Votes %	Votes	+/−
Independent	16			▼6		57.0	10,956	▼18.3
SNP	3			▼2		12.9	2,486	▲4.3
Conservative	3			0		11.2	2,158	▼0.7
Liberal Democrats	3			▲3		9.9	1,898	New
Labour	1			▲1		9.0	1,737	▲4.7
