= 1988 Midlothian District Council election =

1988 Scottish local government election

Results by ward.

Elections to Midlothian District Council were held in May 1988, the same day as the other Scottish local government elections.

== Election results ==
Midlothian local election result 1988
Party	Seats	Gains	Losses	Net gain/loss	Seats %	Votes %	Votes	+/−
Labour	14					56.1	16,930	
Conservative	1					14.7	4,418	
SNP	0				0.0	22.2	6,696	
SLD	0				0;0	4.5	1,349	
SDP	0				0.0	0.7	185	
Other parties	0				0.0	2.1	628	
