= 1988 Gordon District Council election =

Scottish district council election

← 1984	5 May 1988	1992 →

All 16 seats to Gordon District Council 9 seats needed for a majority
	First party	Second party
Party	SSLD	Independent
Last election	2 seats, 25.1%	7 seats, 44.3%
Seats won	10	6
Seat change	▲8	▼1
Popular vote	6,406	2,543
Percentage	49.7%	19.7%
Swing	▲24.6%	▼24.6%

Elections to the Gordon District Council took place on 5 May 1988, alongside elections to the councils of Scotland's various other districts.

== Results ==
1988 Gordon District Council election result
Party	Seats	Gains	Losses	Net gain/loss	Seats %	Votes %	Votes	+/−
SSLD	10	-	-	▲8	63.0	49.7	6,406	▲24.6
Independent	6	-	-	▼1	38.0	19.7	2,543	▼24.6
Conservative	0	-	-	▼3	0.0	22.2	2,859	▼6.5
SNP	0	-	-	Steady	0.0	4.9	638	New
Labour	0	-	-	Steady	0.0	3.5	447	▲1.6

The Social and Liberal Democrats took the most seats and won an overall majority
