= 1988 Wolverhampton Metropolitan Borough Council election =

Wolverhampton Council Elections (1988)

The 1988 Council elections held in Wolverhampton on Thursday 3 May 1988 were one third, and 20 of the 60 seats were up for election.

During the 1984 election the Labour Party gained the Heath Town ward from the SDP–Liberal Alliance.

Candidates that previously would have stood for the SDP–Liberal Alliance stood with the labels, SDP or Social and Liberal Democrats (Liberal Democrats) in the 1988 local elections.

== Ward results ==
Bilston East
Party	Candidate	Votes	%	±%
Labour	J Collingswood	2049		
Conservative	A J Davies	696		
SLD	A Ramsbottom	127		
Majority		1353		

Bilston North
Party	Candidate	Votes	%	±%
Labour	C Dougherty	2331		
Conservative	C Barber	1682		
SLD	R V Smith	216		
Majority		649		

Blakenhall
Party	Candidate	Votes	%	±%
Labour	R Jones	2642		
Conservative	A C Gething	1505		
SLD	M M O'Brien	164		
Majority		1137		

Bushbury
Party	Candidate	Votes	%	±%
Conservative	C Brueton	2225		
Labour	A G Barratt	1655		
SLD	A Whitehouse	239		
Majority		570		

East Park
Party	Candidate	Votes	%	±%
Labour	Mrs P Byrne	2565		
Conservative	I C Jenkins	934		
SLD	P Lewis	551		
Majority		1631		

Ettingshall
Party	Candidate	Votes	%	±%
Labour	A Johnson	2306		
Conservative	Mrs J Shore	736		
SLD	A Whitehouse	125		
Majority		1570		

Fallings Park
Party	Candidate	Votes	%	±%
Labour	Mrs T Walton	2331		
Conservative	M J Torrington	1912		
SDP	D Fysh	297		
Majority		419		

Graiseley
Party	Candidate	Votes	%	±%
Labour	M Chevannes-Reeves	2627		
Conservative	K Pederson	1876		
SLD	B J Lamb	473		
Majority		751		

Heath Town
Party	Candidate	Votes	%	±%
Labour	R N Harding	2303		
Liberal	M A Pearson	836		
Conservative	M Hoare	544		
Majority		1467		

Low Hill
Party	Candidate	Votes	%	±%
Labour	J McCallum	2506		
Conservative	K Gliwitzki	937		
SLD	J S Thompson	207		
Majority		1569		

Merry Hill
Party	Candidate	Votes	%	±%
Conservative	R Bradley	2594		
Labour	S B Smith	1188		
SLD	J N M White	365		
Majority		1406		

Oxley
Party	Candidate	Votes	%	±%
Labour	J Clifford	2298		
Conservative	R J F Ward	1895		
SDP	I Nightingale	248		
Majority		403		

Park
Party	Candidate	Votes	%	±%
Conservative	R Swatman	2783		
Labour	P J Walker	2005		
SLD	G H Ellam	329		
Majority		778		

Penn
Party	Candidate	Votes	%	±%
Conservative	A Hart	3057		
Labour	F Docherty	903		
SLD	C Jones-Williams	413		
Majority		2154		

St Peter's
Party	Candidate	Votes	%	±%
Labour	S S Duhra	2950		
Conservative	B Mellor	801		
SLD	B H Lewis	332		
Majority		2149		

Spring Vale
Party	Candidate	Votes	%	±%
SLD	R Whitehouse	2511		
Labour	A G Garner	1912		
Conservative	J Lenoir	466		
Majority		599		

Tettenhall Regis
Party	Candidate	Votes	%	±%
Conservative	Mrs D Seiboth	2741		
SLD	R Gray	857		
Labour	P E Wesley	856		
Majority		1884		

Tettenhall Wightwick
Party	Candidate	Votes	%	±%
Conservative	W Thompson	2998		
Labour	R J Garner	862		
SLD	E Pringle	393		
Majority		1884		

Wednesfield North
Party	Candidate	Votes	%	±%
Labour	P Bateman	2567		
Conservative	J Smith	1782		
SDP	J Smith	232		
Majority		785		

Wednesfield South
Party	Candidate	Votes	%	±%
Labour	R Servian	2246		
Conservative	J Smith	1570		
SLD	R Waterhouse	222		
Majority		676		
