= 1988 Bearsden and Milngavie District Council election =

1988 Scottish local government election

The 1988 Bearsden and Milngavie District Council election took place on 5 May 1988, alongside elections to the councils of Scotland's various other districts. Each of the 10 wards elected a single member using the first-past-the-post voting system.

== Results ==
1988 Bearsden and Milngavie District Council election result
Party	Seats	Gains	Losses	Net gain/loss	Seats %	Votes %	Votes	+/−
Conservative	6	1	1	Steady	60.0	40.2	7,513	
SSLD	2	1	1	Steady	20.0	30.4	5,687	
Labour	1	0	0	Steady	10.0	15.7	2,927	
Independent	1	0	0	Steady	10.0	5.0	927	
SNP	0	0	0	Steady	0.0	8.8	1,646	
