= 1988 Stirling District Council election =

1988 Scottish local government election

Labour and the Conservatives were tied on 10 seats each

Elections to the Stirling District Council took place in May 1988, alongside elections to the councils of Scotland's various other districts. The number of seats and the total vote share won by each party is listed below.

Labour: 10 seats, 37.6%
Conservative: 10 seats, 39.8%
SNP: 0 seats, 13.7%
Liberal Democrats: 0 seats, 5.0%
Independent: 0 seats, 4.0%
Other Parties: 0 seats, 0.1%
