= 1988 Bolton Metropolitan Borough Council election =

1988 UK local government election

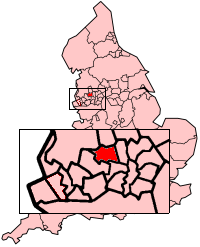
The Metropolitan Borough of Bolton shown within England

The 1988 Bolton Metropolitan Borough Council election took place on 5 May 1988 to elect members of Bolton Metropolitan Borough Council in Greater Manchester, England. One third of the council was up for election and the Labour Party kept overall control of the council.

20 seats were contested in the election: 14 were won by the Labour Party, 5 by the Conservative Party, and 1 by the Liberal Democrats. After the election, the composition of the council was:

- Labour 39
- Conservative 16
- Liberal Democrats 5

== Election result ==
Bolton local election result 1988
Party	Seats	Gains	Losses	Net gain/loss	Seats %	Votes %	Votes	+/−
Labour	14	1	0	+1		49.7	40,411	+8.6
Conservative	5	0	0	+0		33.2	26,992	-2.6
SLD	1	0	1	-1		13.9	11,315	-8.4
Other parties	0	0	0			3.2	2,648	+2.3

== Council Composition ==
Prior to the election the composition of the council was:

↓
38	16	6
Labour	Conservative	L

After the election the composition of the council was:

↓
39	16	5
Labour	Conservative	L

LD – Liberal Democrats

== Ward results ==
=== Astley Bridge ward ===
Astley Bridge ward
Party	Candidate	Votes	%	±%
Conservative	M Higham	2,150	47.1	−7.6
Labour	G Dennis	2,002	43.8	+14.2
Liberal Democrats	M Langdon	417	9.1	−6.6
Majority		148	3.2	−21.9
Turnout		4,569	43.0	−5.3
Conservative hold		Swing	Con to Labour 10.9	

=== Blackrod ward ===
Blackrod ward
Party	Candidate	Votes	%	±%
Labour	E Johnson	1,786	43.2	+6.2
Conservative	J Barrow	1,427	34.6	+0.2
Independent Labour	L Watkinson	603	14.6	+4.1
Liberal Democrats	C Kay	314	7.6	−10.5
Majority		359	8.7	+6.2
Turnout		4,130	49.0	+2.6
Labour hold		Swing	LD to Labour 8.3	

=== Bradshaw ward ===
Bradshaw ward
Party	Candidate	Votes	%	±%
Conservative	W Hall	2,056	51.0	−4.5
Labour	E Collett	1,318	32.7	+9.3
Liberal Democrats	A Steele	657	16.3	−4.8
Majority		738	18.3	−13.8
Turnout		4,031	36.3	−5.7
Conservative hold		Swing	LD to Labour -7.0	

=== Breightmet ward ===
Breightmet ward
Party	Candidate	Votes	%	±%
Labour	K MacIvor	2,582	63.7	+15.4
Conservative	P Jones	1,144	28.2	−7.7
Liberal Democrats	S Vickers	327	8.1	−7.7
Majority		1,528	35.5	+23.2
Turnout		4,305	38.9	−2.0
Labour hold		Swing	Con to Labour -11.5	

=== Bromley Cross ward ===
Bromley Cross ward
Party	Candidate	Votes	%	±%
Conservative	N Critchley	2,230	47.3	−7.0
Independent	S Scotland	1,249	26.5	+26.5
Labour	P Entwistle	940	19.9	−5.3
Liberal Democrats	A Halliwell	294	6.2	−14.4
Majority		981	20.8	−8.3
Turnout		4,713	45.2	−2.5
Conservative hold		Swing		

=== Burnden ward ===
Burnden ward
Party	Candidate	Votes	%	±%
Labour	D Eastwood	2,156	62.1	+9.7
Conservative	E Holland	1,022	29.4	−3.9
Liberal Democrats	L Easterman	296	8.5	−5.8
Majority		1,134	32.6	+13.6
Turnout		3,474	40.0	−3.6
Labour hold		Swing	LD to Labour 7.7	

=== Central ward ===
Central ward
Party	Candidate	Votes	%	±%
Labour	R Howarth	2,379	76.6	+8.8
Conservative	M Kershaw	517	16.7	−3.8
Liberal Democrats	S Howarth	209	6.7	−5.1
Majority		1,862	60.0	+12.7
Turnout		3,105	39.1	−2.2
Labour hold		Swing	LD to Labour 6.9	

=== Daubhill ward ===
Daubhill ward
Party	Candidate	Votes	%	±%
Labour	T Anderton	2,509	69.2	+12.3
Conservative	F Hunter	954	26.3	−4.1
Liberal Democrats	R Ronson	163	4.5	−6.1
Majority		1,555	42.9	+16.4
Turnout		3,626	41.1	−3.1
Labour hold		Swing	LD to Labour 9.2	

=== Deane-cum-Heaton ward ===
Deane-cum-Heaton ward
Party	Candidate	Votes	%	±%
Conservative	F Rushton	2,882	58.0	−0.4
Labour	P Spencer	1,552	31.2	+9.6
Liberal Democrats	A Kay	534	10.7	−9.3
Majority		1,330	26.8	−10.0
Turnout		4,968	38.1	−7.4
Conservative hold		Swing	LD to Labour 9.4	

=== Derby ward ===
Derby ward
Party	Candidate	Votes	%	±%
Labour	J Foster	2,882	78.7	+5.9
Conservative	W Ingham	445	12.2	−4.8
Independent Labour	S Graeme	174	4.8	+4.8
Liberal Democrats	K Barnes	159	4.3	−5.9
Majority		2,437	66.6	+10.9
Turnout		3,660	39.4	−4.6
Labour hold		Swing	LD to Labour 5.9	

=== Farnworth ward ===
Farnworth ward
Party	Candidate	Votes	%	±%
Labour	J Wild	2,320	76.1	+11.0
Conservative	C Adams	493	16.2	−4.2
Liberal Democrats	L Sanderson	236	7.7	−6.7
Majority		1,826	59.9	+15.2
Turnout		3,050	32.7	−3.3
Labour hold		Swing	LD to Labour 8.8	

=== Halliwell ward ===
Halliwell ward
Party	Candidate	Votes	%	±%
Labour	E Hamer	2,740	66.8	+16.7
Conservative	R Pryce	835	20.4	−2.6
Liberal Democrats	D Eccles	524	12.8	−14.1
Majority		1,905	46.5	+23.3
Turnout		4,099	43.0	−3.3
Labour hold		Swing	LD to Labour 15.4	

=== Harper Green ward ===
Harper Green ward
Party	Candidate	Votes	%	±%
Labour	J Boardman	2,346	69.8	+10.5
Conservative	C Churchman	736	21.9	+0.7
Liberal Democrats	G Willis	279	8.3	−11.2
Majority		1,610	47.9	+9.8
Turnout		3,361	32.5	−8.1
Labour hold		Swing	LD to Labour 10.8	

=== Horwich ward ===
Horwich ward
Party	Candidate	Votes	%	±%
Labour	E Walker	2,551	46.1	+7.3
Conservative	C Rigg	1,916	29.6	+0.6
Liberal Democrats	P Houghton	1,005	18.2	−14.0
Independent Labour	M Perks	340	6.1	+6.1
Majority		913	16.5	+9.9
Turnout		5,534	48.5	−4.5
Labour hold		Swing	LD to Labour 10.6	

=== Hulton Park ward ===
Hulton Park ward
Party	Candidate	Votes	%	±%
Conservative	C Higson	2,070	46.8	+3.9
Liberal Democrats	P Mather	1,181	26.7	−10.4
Labour	P Perry	1,173	26.5	+6.6
Majority		889	20.1	+14.3
Turnout		4,424	37.3	−11.0
Conservative hold		Swing	LD to Labour -8.5	

=== Kearsley ward ===
Kearsley ward
Party	Candidate	Votes	%	±%
Labour	J Alker	2,489	62.3	+13.1
Liberal Democrats	J Rothwell	852	21.3	−14.2
Conservative	N Houlcroft	569	14.3	−1.0
SDP	A Howcroft	82	2.1	+2.1
Majority		1,555	38.9	+25.1
Turnout		3,992	40.3	−5.9
Labour hold		Swing	LD to Labour 13.6	

=== Little Lever ward ===
Little Lever ward
Party	Candidate	Votes	%	±%
Labour	K Cunliffe	1,994	46.9	+9.3
Conservative	J Cosgrove	1,840	43.2	−7.0
Liberal Democrats	W Crook	330	7.8	−6.4
SDP	M Taylor	91	2.1	+2.1
Majority		154	3.7	
Turnout		4,255	45.2	−2.4
Labour hold		Swing	LD to Labour +7.8	

=== Smithills ward ===
Smithills ward
Party	Candidate	Votes	%	±%
Liberal	R Hayes	2,237	47.6	−0.8
Conservative	C Shaw	1,623	34.5	−4.2
Labour	E Boardman	731	15.6	+2.7
SDP	I Greenhalgh	109	2.3	+2.3
Majority		614	13.1	+3.4
Turnout		4,700	53.8	−1.1
Liberal Democrats hold		Swing	Con to Labour -2.4	

=== Tonge ward ===
Tonge ward
Party	Candidate	Votes	%	±%
Labour	A Brigg	2,446	59.5	+5.9
Conservative	K Howarth	1,460	35.5	+2.3
Liberal Democrats	B Dunning	206	5.0	−8.2
Majority		986	24.0	+3.7
Turnout		4,112	46.4	−0.9
Labour hold		Swing	LD to Labour 7.0	

=== Westhoughton ward ===
Westhoughton ward
Party	Candidate	Votes	%	±%
Labour	L Thomas	1,355	43.9	+8.1
Liberal Democrats	D Wilkinson	901	29.2	−4.9
Conservative	M Kramer	830	26.9	+4.5
Majority		454	14.7	+13.0
Turnout		3,086	39.6	−10.6
Labour gain from Liberal Democrats		Swing	LD to Labour 6.5	
