= 1988 Kyle and Carrick District Council election =

1988 Scottish local government election

The 1988 Kyle and Carrick District Council election took place on 5 May 1988, alongside elections to the councils of Scotland's various other districts.

== Results ==
1988 Kyle and Carrick District Council election result
Party	Seats	Gains	Losses	Net gain/loss	Seats %	Votes %	Votes	+/−
Labour	16	5	1	▲4	64.0	45.2	22,160	
Conservative	7	0	6	▼6	28.0	33.8	16,565	
Ind. Conservative	1	1	0	▲1	4.0	5.7	2,775	
Independent Labour	1	1	0	▲1	4.0	1.0	490	
SNP	0	0	0	Steady	0.0	9.9	4,871	
SSLD	0	0	0	Steady	0.0	5.7	2,775	
Independent	0	0	0	Steady	0.0	0.3	171	
