= 1988 Motherwell District Council election =

1988 Scottish local government election

The 1988 Motherwell District Council election was held on 5 May 1988, alongside elections to the councils of Scotland's various other districts.

== Results ==
1988 Motherwell District Council election result
Party	Seats	Gains	Losses	Net gain/loss	Seats %	Votes %	Votes	+/−
Labour	23	2	2	Steady	76.7	59.0	32,361	
SNP	3	1	0	▲1	10.0	23.3	12,773	
Conservative	2	0	1	▼1	6.7	7.0	3,854	
Independent	1	0	0	Steady	3.3	3.9	2,137	
Independent Labour	1	1	0	▲1	3.3	3.4	1,848	
Communist	0	0	1	▼1	0.0	1.2	637	
Wishaw Ratepayers' Action Group	0	0	0	Steady	0.0	1.1	621	
SDP	0	0	0	Steady	0.0	0.7	389	New
SSLD	0	0	0	Steady	0.0	0.4	210	
