= 1988 Dunfermline District Council election =

1988 Scottish local government election

Labour took the most seats, and gained an overall majority

Elections to the Dunfermline District Council took place in May 1988, alongside elections to the councils of Scotland's various other districts. The number of seats and the total vote share won by each party is listed below.

Labour: 25 seats, 52.7%
SNP: 3 seats, 17.8%
Conservative: 3 seats, 11.9%
SLD: 3 seats, 11.0%

Other parties and Independents received 6.9% of the vote. Voter turnout was 47.5%.
