= 1988 Moray District Council election =

1988 Scottish local government election

- 5 May 1988

All 18 seats to Moray District Council 10 seats needed for a majority
- Turnout: 44.8%
	First party	Second party	Third party
Party	Independent	SNP	Labour
Last election	15 seats, 81.0%	2 seats, 11.9%	1 seat, 7.1%
Seats won	9	7	2
Seat change	▼6	▲5	▲1
Popular vote	9,946	12,258	2,272
Percentage	36.8%	45.4%	8.4%
Swing	▼44.2%	▲33.5%	▲1.3%
- Map of ward results

- Council composition following the election

Elections to Moray District Council were held on 5 May 1988, on the same day as the other Scottish local government elections. This was the fifth election to the district council following the implementation of the Local Government (Scotland) Act 1973.

The election used the 18 wards created by the Initial Statutory Reviews of Electoral Arrangements in 1980. Each ward elected one councillor using first-past-the-post voting.

== Background ==
At the 1984 election to Moray District Council, Independents held 15 seats, many being unopposed.

1984 Moray District Council election result
Party	Seats	Vote share
Independent	15	81.0%
SNP	2	11.9%
Labour	1	7.1%

== Results ==
1988 Moray District Council election result
Party	Seats	Gains	Losses	Net gain/loss	Seats %	Votes %	Votes	+/−
Independent	9	0	6	▼6	50.0	36.8	9,946	▼44.2
SNP	7	5	0	▲5	38.9	45.4	12,258	▲33.5
Labour	2	1	0	▲1	11.1	8.4	2,272	▲1.3
Conservative	0	0	0	Steady	0.0	8.0	2,163	New
SSLD	0	0	0	Steady	0.0	1.4	369	New

== Ward results ==
=== Bishopmill ===
Party	Candidate	Votes	%
Labour	C Smith	1,180	61.9
SNP	A Anderson (Incumbent)	718	37.7
Majority		462	24.2
Turnout		1,905	49.6
Labour gain from Independent			

=== Cathedral ===
Party	Candidate	Votes	%
Labour	A Farquharson (Incumbent)	856	54.6
SNP	A Munn	507	32.3
Independent	E McCaskill	199	12.7
Majority		349	22.3
Turnout		1,568	41.7
Labour hold			

=== New Elgin ===
Party	Candidate	Votes	%
Independent	R Hossack (Incumbent)	907	63.0
SNP	E Burns	532	36.9
Majority		375	26.0
Turnout		1,440	44.3
Independent hold			

=== Central West ===
Party	Candidate	Votes	%
Independent	J Proctor (Incumbent)	994	56.6
SNP	J Burns	755	43.0
Majority		239	13.6
Turnout		1,756	45.5
Independent hold			

=== Forres ===
Party	Candidate	Votes	%
SNP	H Cumiskie	945	54.7
Independent	C White	780	45.1
Majority		165	9.6
Turnout		1,728	38.5
SNP gain from Independent			

=== Findhorn Valley ===
Party	Candidate	Votes	%
SNP	R Laing	644	35.9
Independent	W Anderson	613	34.2
Independent	B Brands	536	29.9
Majority		31	1.7
Turnout		1,795	37.0
SNP gain from Independent			

=== Laich ===
Party	Candidate	Votes	%
SNP	D Scaife	872	61.2
Independent	D Thompson (Incumbent)	551	38.6
Majority		321	22.6
Turnout		1,426	38.3
SNP gain from Independent			

=== Lossiemouth ===
Party	Candidate	Votes	%
SNP	R Murdoch (Incumbent)	1,379	75.6
Conservative	K Smith	438	24.0
Majority		941	51.6
Turnout		1,825	43.8
SNP gain from Independent			

=== Heldon ===
Party	Candidate	Votes	%
Independent	I Lawson	383	38.7
SSLD	A Skene	369	37.3
SNP	W Ross	232	23.5
Majority		14	1.4
Turnout		989	34.4
Independent hold			

=== Innes ===
Party	Candidate	Votes	%
Independent	J Shaw (Incumbent)	985	58.1
SNP	K Stuart	700	41.3
Majority		285	16.8
Turnout		1,695	43.6
Independent hold			

=== Buckie West ===
Party	Candidate	Votes	%
SNP	W Jappy	941	56.3
Conservative	J Reid	493	29.5
Labour	L Forbes	236	14.1
Majority		448	26.8
Turnout		1,671	52.0
SNP hold			

=== Buckie East ===
Party	Candidate	Votes	%
SNP	H Munro	971	66.1
Conservative	A Thain	496	33.7
Majority		475	32.4
Turnout		1,470	46.6
SNP hold			

=== Rathford ===
Party	Candidate	Votes	%
Independent	M Wilson	794	46.3
SNP	J Hepburn	412	24.0
Independent	W Cook	275	16.0
Conservative	J Smith	231	13.5
Majority		382	22.3
Turnout		1,714	52.0
Independent hold			

=== Lennox ===
Party	Candidate	Votes	%
SNP	T Howe (Incumbent)	1,110	68.4
Conservative	N Robertson	505	31.1
Majority		605	37.3
Turnout		1,622	55.6
SNP gain from Independent			

=== Keith ===
Party	Candidate	Votes	%
Independent	L Mann (Incumbent)	1,276	73.1
SNP	L Esslemont	468	26.8
Majority		808	46.3
Turnout		1,745	50.7
Independent hold			

=== Strathisla ===
Party	Candidate	Votes	%
Independent	W Watt (Incumbent)	486	51.8
SNP	D Barr	452	48.1
Majority		34	3.7
Turnout		939	38.6
Independent hold			

=== Speyside ===
Party	Candidate	Votes	%
Independent	E Aldridge (Incumbent)	1,167	65.3
SNP	H McBain	620	34.7
Majority		547	30.6
Turnout		1,787	53.6
Independent hold			

=== Glenlivet ===
Party	Candidate	Votes	%
Independent	M Campbell	Unopposed	
Independent hold			
