= 1988 Clydebank District Council election =

1988 Scottish local government election

The 1988 Clydebank District Council election took place on 5 May 1988, alongside elections to the councils of Scotland's various other districts. Each of the 12 wards elected a single member using the first-past-the-post voting system.

== Results ==
1988 Clydebank District Council election result
Party	Seats	Gains	Losses	Net gain/loss	Seats %	Votes %	Votes	+/−
Labour	11	0	0	Steady	91.7	57.2	10,916	
Conservative	1	0	0	Steady	8.3	5.9	1,130	
SNP	0	0	0	Steady	0.0	32.0	6,119	
Independent	0	0	0	Steady	0.0	2.8	541	
Green	0	0	0	Steady	0.0	2.1	392	New
