= Scottish Labour Party (disambiguation) =

Scottish Labour is the administrative subdivision of the Labour Party which operates in Scotland.

Scottish Labour Party may also refer to:

- Scottish Labour Party (1888), founded by Robert Cunninghame-Graham and Keir Hardie
- Scottish Labour Party (1976), a breakaway from the Labour Party (UK)
- Labour Party of Scotland, a group centred on Dundee in 1973
