= 1974 City of Aberdeen District Council election =

1974 Scottish local government election

← 1973	7 May 1974	1977 →

All 48 seats to City of Aberdeen Council 25 seats needed for a majority
	First party	Second party	Third party
	Lab	Con	Lib
Party	Labour	Conservative	Liberal
Seats won	29	17	2
Popular vote	24,484	18,937	7,948
Percentage	45.0%	34.8%	14.6%
- The 48 single-member wards
Council Leader before election
Labour
Council Leader after election
Labour

Elections to the City of Aberdeen District Council were held on 7 May 1974, on the same day as the other Scottish local government elections. This was the first election to the district council following the implementation of the Local Government (Scotland) Act 1973.

The election used the 48 wards created by the Formation Electoral Arrangements in 1974. Each ward elected one councillor using first-past-the-post voting.

Labour took control of the council after winning a majority. The party took 29 of the 48 seats and more than 40% of the popular vote. The Conservatives came second with 17 seats. The remaining two seats were won by the Liberals.

== Background ==
Aberdeen was made a royal burgh by David I (reigned 1124–1153) and a police burgh was established in 1795. Following the local government reforms in 1890, Aberdeen became one of the four Counties of Cities and was administratively separate from Aberdeenshire.

Following the recommendations in the Wheatly Report, the old system of counties and burghs in Scotland – which had resulted in a mishmash of local government areas in which some small burghs had larger populations but far fewer responsibilities than some large burghs and even counties – was to be replaced by a new system of regional and district councils. The Local Government (Scotland) Act 1973 implemented most of the recommendations in the Wheatly Report. The City of Aberdeen District Council – placed within the Grampian region – took in a much larger area than its predecessor as Cove Bay and Dyce incorporated within the city.

== Election results ==
1974 City of Aberdeen District Council election result
Party	Seats	Gains	Losses	Net gain/loss	Seats %	Votes %	Votes	+/−
Labour	29			N/A		45.0	24,484	N/A
Conservative	17			N/A		34.8	18,937	N/A
Liberal	2			N/A		14.6	7,948	N/A
Independent	0			N/A		3.0	1,629	N/A
SNP	0			N/A		2.0	1,109	N/A
Communist	0			N/A		0.5	285	N/A

== Aftermath ==
The City of Aberdeen was the only district in the newly created Grampian region that was won by a party – the rest were controlled by independents. Labour took 29 of the 48 seats while the Conservatives – who took control of the regional council which held its first election on the same day – were the largest opposition party with 17. The remaining two seats were won by the Liberals. Across Scotland, Labour won the most votes, the most seats and the most councils of any party.
