= 1980 City of Aberdeen District Council election =

1980 Scottish local government election

← 1977	1 May 1980	1984 →

All 48 seats to City of Aberdeen Council 25 seats needed for a majority

	First party	Second party	Third party
Party	Labour	Conservative	Liberal
Last election	22 seats, 37.5%%	16 seats, 36.0%	7 seats, 15.8%
Seats won	27	13	8
Seat change	▲5	▼3	▲1
Popular vote	22,900	16,748	9,679
Percentage	44.3%	32.4%	18.7%
Swing	▲6.8%	▼3.6%	▲2.9%
- The 48 single-member wards
Council Leader before election
No overall control
Council Leader after election
Labour

The 1980 City of Aberdeen District Council election took place on 1 May 1980 to elect members of City of Aberdeen Council, as part of that years Scottish local elections.

== Election results ==
City of Aberdeen local election result 1980
Party	Seats	Gains	Losses	Net gain/loss	Seats %	Votes %	Votes	+/−
Labour	27			▲5		44.3	22,900	▲6.8
Conservative	13			▼3		32.4	16,748	▼3.6
Liberal	8			▲1		18.7	9,679	▲2.9
SNP	0			0	0.0	4.1	2,122	▼1.2
Independent	0			0	0.0	0.3	137	▼3.5
Communist	0			0	0.0	0.1	68	▼0.2
