= 1973 Dundee Corporation election =

Local election in Scotland

An election to the Dundee Corporation was held on 1 May 1973, alongside 1312 municipal elections across Scotland. 13 of the corporation's 36 seats were up for election.

The election saw Labour manage to hold on to its slim majority over the Progressives on the corporation, with 18 of the council's 36 seats. No seats changed hands, with the Progressives remaining on 17, and 1 Independent. Two Labour Councillors, William Millar and ex-Baillie John Stewart in Lochee and Douglas wards respectively, were deselected by Labour as candidates and ran as independents instead. Neither were re-elected.

== Aggregate results ==
1973 Dundee Corporation election
Party	Seats	Gains	Losses	Net gain/loss	Seats %	Votes %	Votes	+/−
Labour	7	0	0	Steady			25,549	
Progressives	6	0	0	Steady			18,528	
Independent	0	0	0	Steady	0.0		2,213	
Labour Party of Scotland	0	0	0	Steady	0.0		1,279	
Dundee Citizens Union	0	0	0	Steady	0.0		998	
Independent Labour	0	0	0	Steady	0.0		962	
Liberal	0	0	0	Steady	0.0		600	
Communist	0	0	0	Steady	0.0		344	

== Ward results ==
Harbour
Party	Candidate	Votes	%
Progressives	L. D. Johnston	1,815	
Labour	J. McAulay	870	
Dundee Citizens Union	G. Scott	85	
Labour Party of Scotland	L. MacQueen	81	
Majority			
Turnout			
Progressives hold			

Riverside
Party	Candidate	Votes	%
Progressives	W. J. Fitzgerald	1,996	
Labour	K. McRae	962	
Dundee Citizens Union	M. Leslie	117	
Majority			
Turnout			
Progressives hold			

Lochee
Party	Candidate	Votes	%
Labour	J. Martin	2,906	
Independent	W. Millar	1,029	
Progressives	A. P. Brodie Steel	655	
Labour Party of Scotland	D. McTaggart	112	
Dundee Citizens Union	J. Clark	64	
Majority			
Turnout			
Labour hold			

Craigie
Party	Candidate	Votes	%
Progressives	H. Murray	2,343	
Labour	J. Barton	2,005	
Labour Party of Scotland	G. McKenzie	209	
Majority			
Turnout			
Progressives hold			

Caird
Party	Candidate	Votes	%
Labour	J. Doig	2,591	
Progressives	J. Barnett	1,007	
Labour Party of Scotland	J. Fairweather	134	
Dundee Citizens Union	J. Campbell	81	
Majority			
Turnout			
Labour hold			

Law
Party	Candidate	Votes	%
Progressives	J. Whyte	2,604	
Labour	W. McKelvey	1,736	
Dundee Citizens Union	J. Carroll	133	
Majority			
Turnout			
Progressives hold			

Downfield
Party	Candidate	Votes	%
Labour	M. McManus	2,848	
Progressives	T. Dailly	692	
Labour Party of Scotland	G. McLean	242	
Dundee Citizens Union	T. Black	91	
Communist	P. L. Docherty	69	
Majority			
Turnout			
Labour hold			

Camperdown 2 seats
Party	Candidate	Votes	%
Labour	E. Vigtow	2,909	
Labour	F. Fagan	2,850	
Independent Labour	I. Gardiner	962	
Dundee Citizens Union	N. Maiden	235	
Labour Party of Scotland	I. M. Donaldson	227	
Communist	H. McLevey	196	
Labour Party of Scotland	D. McGarry	123	
Majority			
Turnout			
Labour hold			
Labour hold			

Balgay
Party	Candidate	Votes	%
Progressives	W. Malcolm	2,247	
Labour	J. Cameron	1,132	
Majority			
Turnout			
Progressives hold			

Douglas
Party	Candidate	Votes	%
Labour	F. Welsh	2,532	
Independent	J. Stewart	1,184	
Progressives	Janet W. Allen	789	
Labour Party of Scotland	H. Dunning	94	
Dundee Citizens Union	D. White	83	
Communist	R. Mennie	79	
Majority			
Turnout			
Labour hold			

Broughty Ferry
Party	Candidate	Votes	%
Progressives	G. M. Gillies	3,963	
Liberal	C. Brodie	600	
Labour	J. Boland	560	
Dundee Citizens Union	R. Devlin	70	
Majority			
Turnout			
Progressives hold			

Hilltown
Party	Candidate	Votes	%
Labour	H. Dickson	1,648	
Progressives	Mary Barrowman	417	
Labour Party of Scotland	J. Alexander	57	
Dundee Citizens Union	S. Khan	39	
Majority			
Turnout			
Labour hold			
