= 1973 Edinburgh Corporation election =

1973 Scottish local government election

- 1 May 1973

23 of the 69 seats to the Edinburgh Corporation 35 seats needed for a majority
	First party	Second party	Third party
Leader	Peter Wilson	Brian Meek	Donald Gorrie
Party	Labour	Conservative	Liberal
Last election	33	9	5
Seats before	35	20	6
Seats won	13	9	3
Seats after	34	21	7
Seat change	▼1	▲1	▲1
Popular vote	44,456	29,806	20,155
Percentage	37.8%	25.3%	17.1%
	Fourth party	Fifth party
Party	Progressives	Independent
Last election	21	2
Seats before	5	2
Seats won	1	0
Seats after	4	1
Seat change	▼1	▼1
Popular vote	17,406	N/A
Percentage	14.8%	N/A
- Results by ward.
Council control before election
No overall control
Council control after election
No overall control

An Election to the Edinburgh Corporation was held on 1 May 1973, alongside municipal elections across Scotland. Of the councils 69 seats, 26 were up for election. Labour, despite needing only 1 gain to take control of the council, failed to do so, preventing them from a historic win.

Following the election, with two by-elections pending, Edinburgh Corporation was composed of 34 Labour councillors, 21 Conservatives, and 7 Liberals, with 5 others.

By this point only a small rump Progressive party remained on the council, with the bulk of Progressive councillors having joined the Conservatives. A small number, such as Mrs Catherine Filsell (a former Progressive leader), had joined Labour.

== Aggregate results ==
Edinburgh Corporation election, 1973
Party	Seats	Gains	Losses	Net gain/loss	Seats %	Votes %	Votes	+/−
Labour	13	2	2	Steady	50.0	37.8	44,456	
Conservative	9	3	2	▲1	26.9	25.3	29,806	
Liberal	3	1	0	▲1	11.5	17.1	20,155	
Progressives	1	0	1	▼1	11.5	14.8	17,406	
SNP	0	0	0	Steady	0.0	3.5	4,065	
Communist	0	0	0	Steady	0.0	1.1	1,267	
Wester Hailes Association of Tenants	0	0	0	Steady	0.0	0.3	312	
Independent Local Community	0	0	0	Steady	0.0	0.1	146	
Independent	0	0	0	▼1	0.0	0.0	0	

== Ward results ==
Location of Broughton ward

Broughton
Party	Candidate	Votes	%
Conservative	W. R. V. Percy	1,811	
Labour	M. J. O'Neill	1,317	
Liberal	Elizabeth R. Barclay	867	
Majority		494	
Turnout			32.64%
Conservative hold			

Location of Calton ward

Calton
Party	Candidate	Votes	%
Labour	J. Cook	2,065	
Conservative	A. G. Jackson	1,426	
Majority		839	
Turnout			34.76%
Labour hold			

Location of Central Leith ward

Central Leith
Party	Candidate	Votes	%
Labour	T. McGregor	1,695	
Conservative	D. C. Dow	485	
SNP	J. L. Geddes	429	
Majority		1,210	
Turnout			26.33%
Labour hold			

Location of Colinton ward

Colinton
Party	Candidate	Votes	%
Conservative	A. H. Lester	5,442	
Labour	J. H. McKay	3,956	
SNP	J. McKernan	914	
Wester Hailes Association of Tenants	J. Henderson	312	
Majority		1,486	
Turnout			40.18%
Conservative gain from Labour			

Location of Corstorphine ward

Corstorphine
Party	Candidate	Votes	%
Liberal	D. C. E. Gorrie	4,773	
Progressives	R. P. Haig	2,677	
Labour	W. Wallace	629	
Majority		2,096	
Turnout			45.11%
Liberal hold			

Location of Craigentinny ward

Craigentinny
Party	Candidate	Votes	%
Labour	Phyllis Herriot	3,253	
Conservative	G. V. McArn	1,978	
Communist	T. Burns	116	
Majority		1275	
Turnout			36.17%
Labour hold			

Location of Craigmillar ward

Craigmillar
Party	Candidate	Votes	%
Labour	D. H. Brown	2,722	
Communist	J. O'Donnell	132	
Majority		2,590	
Turnout			18.93%
Labour hold			

Location of George Square ward

George Square
Party	Candidate	Votes	%
Labour	J. F. Stephen	1,705	
Labour	W. I. Taylor	1,598	
Conservative	W. Reid	1,587	
Conservative	J. Slack	1,545	
Liberal	M. G. Falchikov	847	
Majority		11	
Turnout			74.58%
Labour gain from Conservative			
Labour gain from Conservative			

Location of Gorgie-Dalry ward

Gorgie-Dalry
Party	Candidate	Votes	%
Labour	D. M. Swinson	2,061	
Conservative	Fiona M. Cameron	959	
Liberal	D. R. Irving	577	
SNP	E. J. Milne	461	
Majority		1,102	
Turnout			30.57%
Labour hold			

Location of Holyrood ward

Holyrood
Party	Candidate	Votes	%
Labour	B. C. Rutherford	1,262	
Conservative	L. Taylor	617	
Majority		645	
Turnout			28.25%
Labour hold			

Location of Liberton ward

Liberton
Party	Candidate	Votes	%
Labour	J. D. McWilliam	5,122	
Conservative	Susan K. Elliot	3,097	
Communist	W. Cowan	133	
Majority		2,025	
Turnout			32.43%
Labour hold			

Location of Merchiston ward

Merchiston
Party	Candidate	Votes	%
Liberal	R. L. Smith	3,129	
Conservative	Sarah A. Pringle	1,545	
Labour	A. M. M. Black	577	
SNP	G. Bishop	196	
Majority		1,584	
Turnout			46.72%
Liberal hold			

Location of Morningside ward

Morningside
Party	Candidate	Votes	%
Liberal	N. L. Gordon	3,676	
Progressives	H. Mansbridge	2,910	
SNP	W. Black	359	
Majority		766	
Turnout			50.36%
Liberal gain from Progressives			

Location of Murrayfield-Cramond ward

Murrayfield-Cramond
Party	Candidate	Votes	%
Conservative	J. A. Douglas-Hamilton	4,772	
Labour	P. E. McGhee	1,807	
Liberal	E. Sutherland	1,391	
Majority		2965	
Turnout			35.20%
Conservative hold			

Location of Newington ward

Newington 2 seats Electorate: 16,592
Party	Candidate	Votes	%
Conservative	Malcolm Rifkind	3,654	29.92
Conservative	Margaret E. S. Houston	3,266	26.74
Labour	B. Mackenzie	1,890	15.48
Liberal	J. R. MacGillivray	1,784	14.61
SNP	R. J. D. Scott	713	5.84
SNP	D. Kelbie	701	5.74
Communist	Michele Gunn	204	1.67
Majority		1376	
Turnout			73.60%
Conservative hold			
Conservative gain from Independent			

Location of Pilton ward

Pilton
Party	Candidate	Votes	%
Labour	M. J. Williamson	2,715	
SNP	G. W. Telford	993	
Conservative	J. Johnston	649	
Communist	C. McManus	128	
Majority		1,722	
Turnout			23.70%
Labour hold			

Location of Portobello ward

Portobello
Party	Candidate	Votes	%
Conservative	J. Cavaye	3,350	
Labour	Mary Hutchison	1,501	
Majority		1,849	
Turnout			33.94%
Conservative hold			

Location of St Andrews ward

St. Andrews
Party	Candidate	Votes	%
Conservative	A. Brown	968	
Liberal	C. S. Waterman	910	
Labour	E. Milligan	504	
Majority		58	
Turnout			32.66%
Conservative hold			

Location of St Bernards ward

St. Bernard's
Party	Candidate	Votes	%
Conservative	J. Millar	3,075	
Labour	Gertrude Barton	1,868	
Liberal	R. H. Guild	1,631	
Independent Local Community	A. Stevenson	146	
Majority		1,207	
Turnout			37.42%
Conservative hold			

Location of St Giles ward

St. Giles
Party	Candidate	Votes	%
Labour	Elizabeth R. Mackenzie	999	
Labour	C. Stuart	994	
Conservative	H. Lorimer	490	
Conservative	Caroline Peploe	451	
Majority		504	
Turnout			36.82%
Labour hold			

Location of Sighthill ward

Sighthill
Party	Candidate	Votes	%
Labour	G. Foulkes	3,375	
Conservative	G. A. R. Fenson	680	
Liberal	A. Burnett	570	
SNP	R. Mackenna	554	
Communist	W. M.Millar	60	
Majority		2695	
Turnout			28.47%
Labour hold			

Location of South Leith

South Leith
Party	Candidate	Votes	%
Conservative	C. Waugh	2,061	
Labour	J. Boyack	2,000	
Majority		61	
Turnout			35.60%
Conservative gain from Labour			

Location of West Leith ward

West Leith
Party	Candidate	Votes	%
Progressives	Margaret B. A. Ross	2,979	
Labour	N. Lindsay	1,433	
Majority		1,546	
Turnout			39.18%
Progressives hold			
