= 1973 Scottish local elections =

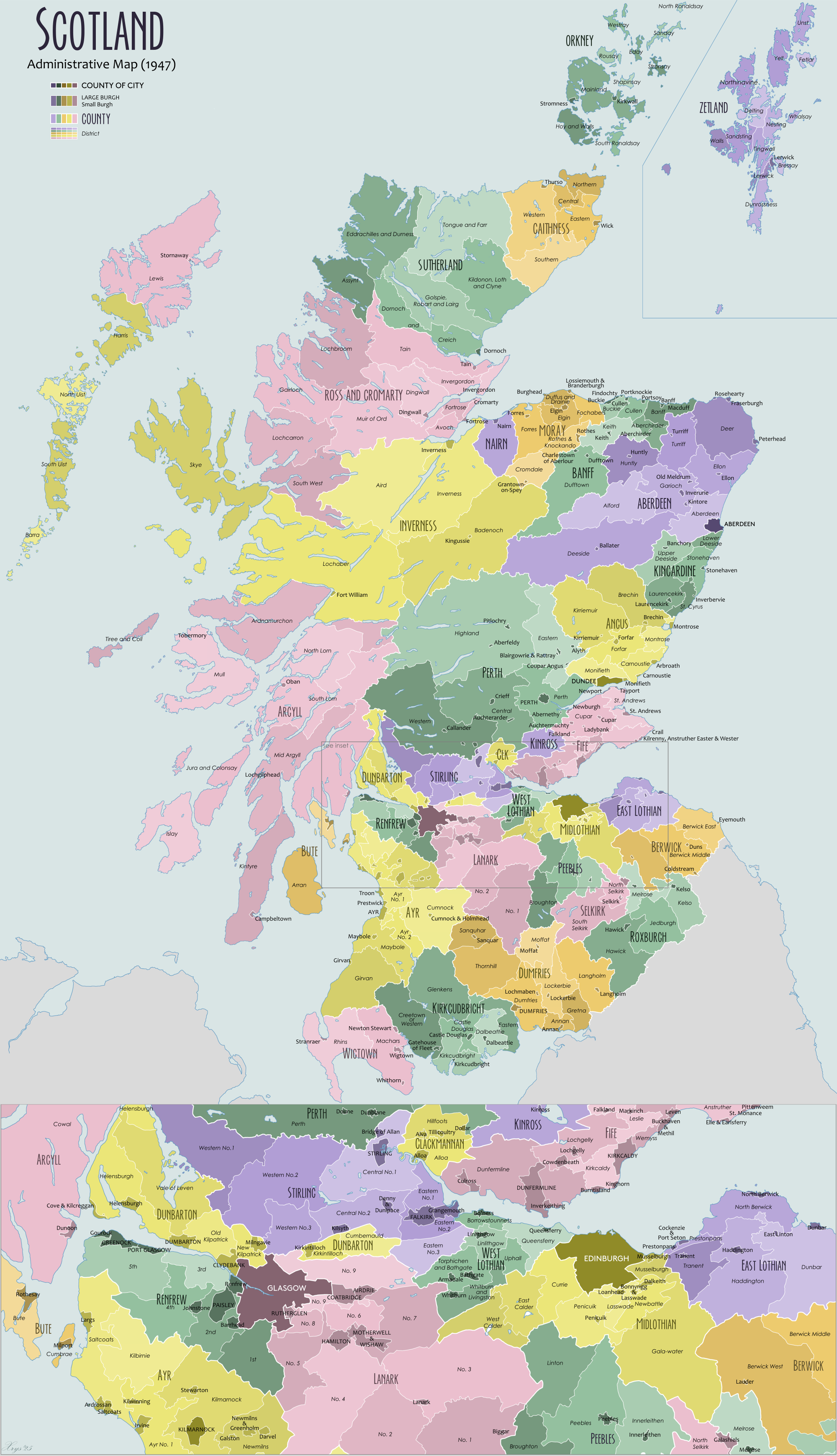
Map of Scottish local government divisions prior to reorganisation in 1975.

Local elections were held in Scotland in May 1973, as part of that year's wider British local elections. The elections were the last to the local authorities created under the Local Government (Scotland) Act 1929, and were replaced in 1975 by a uniform system of regions and districts.

Elections to the 4 city corporations, 21 town councils of large burghs and 176 town councils of small burghs took place on 1 May 1973; elections to the 33 county councils took place a week later on 8 May 1973.

== Municipal elections ==
=== Results by council ===
==== Counties of cities ====
Council	Seats up	Lab	Con (Note: Includes councillors standing as Progressives or Moderates.)	Lib	SNP	Turnout	Control	Details
Aberdeen	12 (of 36)	6	5	1	0	27.4%	Labour hold	Details
Dundee	13 (of 36)	7	6	0	0	37.0%	Labour hold	Details
Edinburgh	26 (of 69)	13	10	3	0		No overall control hold	Details
Glasgow	37 (of 111)	26	11	0	0	30.5%	Labour hold	Details

==== Large burghs ====
Council	Seats up	Lab	Con	Lib	SNP	Ind	Other	Turnout	Details
Airdrie	5	4	1	0	0	0	0	43.4%	Details
Arbroath	7	2	0	0	1	4	0	41.6%	Details
Ayr	7	2	5	0	0	0	0	0.0% (Note: There were no elections in Ayr, as Labour and the Moderates agreed to only field candidates in the seats they were defending, in order to save funds for the 1974 election campaign.)	Details
Clydebank	7	6	0	0	0	0	1	41.0%	Details
Coatbridge	6	5	1	0	0	0	0		Details
Dumbarton	5	4	1	0	0	0	0	29.8%	Details
Dumfries	9	3	2	0	0	4	0	32.0%	Details
Dunfermline	9	4	5	0	0	0	0	40.5%	Details
East Kilbride	6	6	0	0	0	0	0	38.2%	Details
Falkirk	5	3	1	0	1	0	0		Details
Greenock	9	7	0	2	0	0	0	40.0%	Details
Hamilton	5	4	1	0	0	0	0	31.5%	Details
Inverness	8	0	0	0	1	7	0	31.2%	Details
Kilmarnock	8	7	1	0	0	0	0	34.0%	Details
Kirkcaldy	10	4	1	0	1	0	4	39.3%	Details
Motherwell and Wishaw	9	7	0	0	0	2	0	28.7%	Details
Paisley	10	7	1	0	0	2	0	29.9%	Details
Perth	8	5	1	0	0	0	2	37.6%	Details
Port Glasgow	4	3	0	0	0	0	1	35.9%	Details
Rutherglen	6	4	1	0	0	1	0		Details
Stirling	7	4	0	0	1	2	0	40.3%	Details
