= 1992 City of Aberdeen District Council election =

Election to elect members of City of Aberdeen Council

← 1988	7 May 1992	1995 →

All 52 seats to City of Aberdeen District Council 27 seats needed for a majority

	First party	Second party
Party	Labour	Liberal Democrats
Last election	28 seats, 45.1%	14 seats, 25.6%
Seats won	27	13
Seat change	▼1	▼1
Popular vote	19,853	14,606
Percentage	34.8%	25.6%
Swing	▼10.3%	0.0%
	Third party	Fourth party
Party	Conservative	SNP
Last election	9 seats, 18.2%	1 seat, 9.4%
Seats won	10	2
Seat change	▲1	▲1
Popular vote	13,487	8,925
Percentage	23.6%	15.6%
Swing	▲5.4%	▲6.2%
- The 52 single-member wards
Council Leader before election
Labour
Council Leader after election
Labour

The 1992 City of Aberdeen District Council election took place in May 1992 to elect members of City of Aberdeen Council, as part of that year's Scottish local elections.

== Election results ==
The result of the election

City of Aberdeen District Election Result 1992
Party	Seats	Gains	Losses	Net gain/loss	Seats %	Votes %	Votes	+/−
Labour	27	0	1	▼1	51.9	34.8	19,853	▼10.3
Liberal Democrats	13	0	1	▼1	25.0	25.6	14,606	0.0
Conservative	10	1	0	▲1	19.2	23.6	13,487	▲5.4
SNP	2	1	0	▲1	3.8	15.6	8,925	▲6.2
Independent Labour	0	0	0	0	0.0	0.4	203	New
Scottish Green	0	0	0	0	0.0	0.0	16	▼0.2

== Ward results ==
Ward 1: Grandholm
Party	Candidate	Votes	%
Labour	C. Massie	396	54.2
SNP	A.M. Greenhorn	126	17.2
Conservative	S.P. Redgrave	109	14.9
Liberal Democrats	N.D. Fletcher	83	2.2
Scottish Green	R.A. Dunham	16	2.2
Majority		270	
Turnout			22.9

Ward 2: Tillydrone
Party	Candidate	Votes	%
Labour	J. Wyness	506	71.0
SNP	S.C. Hutcheon	149	20.9
Liberal Democrats	A.R. Bryson	56	7.9
Majority		357	
Turnout			23.7

Ward 3: Old Aberdeen
Party	Candidate	Votes	%
Labour	M. Irons	363	41.5
Liberal Democrats	S.L. Kirkwood	286	32.7
SNP	C.D. Ross	140	16.0
Conservative	N. Bell	85	9.7
Majority		77	
Turnout			29.9

Ward 4: Sunnybank
Party	Candidate	Votes	%
Labour	M.E. Smith	426	50.5
SNP	F.R. Finnie	159	18.9
Liberal Democrats	A.F. Doyle	146	17.3
Conservative	J.B. Parsons	111	13.2
Majority		267	
Turnout			26.8

Ward 5: Middlefield
Party	Candidate	Votes	%
SNP	B.J. Adam	560	77.6
Labour	A.J. Forrest	136	18.8
Liberal Democrats	S.J. Simpson	24	3.3
Majority		424	
Turnout			29.5

Ward 6: Cummings Park
Party	Candidate	Votes	%
Labour	M.E. Farquhar	448	56.1
SNP	M.E. Watt	349	43.7
Majority		99	
Turnout			28.6

Ward 7: Marchburn
Party	Candidate	Votes	%
Labour	N. Cooney	534	56.3
SNP	A. Angus	412	43.4
Majority		122	
Turnout			29.6

Ward 8: Springhill
Party	Candidate	Votes	%
SNP	P.B. Greenhorn	687	57.4
Labour	J.A. Lamond	472	39.4
Liberal Democrats	D. Baxter	38	3.2
Majority		215	
Turnout			41.5

Ward 9: Hilton
Party	Candidate	Votes	%
Labour	R. Buchan	522	43.6
Liberal Democrats	S. Wainman	442	37.0
SNP	J.D.R. McClure	153	6.2
Conservative	D.L. Stephens	74	6.2
Majority		80	
Turnout			38.6

Ward 10: Cattofield
Party	Candidate	Votes	%
Liberal Democrats	O.B. Rutherford	694	55.4
Labour	A.J.A. Bjorkelund	261	20.8
Conservative	I. Simpson	156	12.5
SNP	H. Gowers	140	11.2
Majority		433	
Turnout			34.9

Ward 11: Balgownie
Party	Candidate	Votes	%
Labour	A. Stevely	475	69.2
SNP	C.C. Hughes	198	28.9
Majority		277	
Turnout			22.0

Ward 12: Linksfield
Party	Candidate	Votes	%
Labour	W. Traynor	615	57.9
SNP	I. MacL Hughes	260	24.5
Liberal Democrats	G.J. Peacock	185	17.4
Majority		355	
Turnout			33.2

Ward 13: Quarryhill
Party	Candidate	Votes	%
Labour	R.G. Milne	627	72.6
SNP	I.A. Carle	230	26.6
Majority		397	
Turnout			29.5

Ward 14: Muirfield
Party	Candidate	Votes	%
Labour	W.J. Fraser	462	67.6
SNP	C.J. McCormick	251	31.5
Majority		247	
Turnout			25.9

Ward 15: Stockethill
Party	Candidate	Votes	%
Labour	T. Paine	770	72.0
SNP	G. Graham	188	17.6
Conservative	J. Wokoma	111	10.4
Majority		582	
Turnout			33.4

Ward 16: Westburn
Party	Candidate	Votes	%
Labour	G. Third	435	56.6
Conservative	K.C. Longmore	174	22.7
SNP	J. Noble	152	19.8
Majority		261	
Turnout			27.2

Ward 17: Sheddocksley
Party	Candidate	Votes	%
Labour	H.E. Rae	606	71.7
SNP	A.G. Smith	237	28.0
Majority		369	
Turnout			28.7

Ward 18: Summerhill
Party	Candidate	Votes	%
Labour	K. Savidge	506	62.2
SNP	J. Dickson	159	19.6
Conservative	D. Morgan	148	18.2
Majority		347	
Turnout			27.6

Ward 19: Midstocket
Party	Candidate	Votes	%
Conservative	G.C. Adams	891	58.5
Labour	B.A. Gemmell	294	19.3
Liberal Democrats	A.W. Stokes	194	12.7
SNP	F. Nimmo	142	9.3
Majority		597	
Turnout			46.4

Ward 20: Argyll
Party	Candidate	Votes	%
Labour	B.C. Rutherford	425	42.1
Conservative	D.G. Chappell	379	37.5
SNP	P. Grant	205	20.3
Majority		46	
Turnout			34.8

Ward 21: Harlaw
Party	Candidate	Votes	%
Conservative	S.L.A. Reith	650	60.5
Liberal Democrats	D. MacLauchlan	169	15.7
Labour	J.M. Nicol	164	15.3
SNP	C. Cairns	91	8.5
Majority		481	
Turnout			34.5

Ward 22: Queens Cross
Party	Candidate	Votes	%
Conservative	R.D.I. Anderson	796	68.3
Liberal Democrats	S.M. Reid	192	16.5
Labour	A.W. Benzie	175	15.0
Majority		604	
Turnout			37.5

Ward 23: Pittodrie
Party	Candidate	Votes	%
Labour	R.R. Webster	736	67.3
SNP	J. Williams	164	15.0
Conservative	P.C. Milne	129	11.8
Liberal Democrats	D.E. Cumming	65	5.9
Majority		572	
Turnout			29.9

Ward 24: Castlehill
Party	Candidate	Votes	%
Labour	A.C. Collie	428	49.7
Independent Labour	T.J.R. Penny	203	23.6
SNP	S. West	105	12.2
Conservative	I.G. Lofthus	91	10.6
Liberal Democrats	A. Davidson	34	3.9
Majority		225	
Turnout			32.1

Ward 25: Causewayend
Party	Candidate	Votes	%
Labour	C.H. Clevitt	459	62.6
SNP	L.W. Sutherland	261	35.6
Majority		198	
Turnout			24.3

Ward 26: Denburn
Party	Candidate	Votes	%
Labour	J. Buchan	378	54.5
Conservative	T.G.F. Wood	168	24.2
SNP	S.E. Stephen	147	21.2
Majority		210	
Turnout			25.9

Ward 27: Fernielea
Party	Candidate	Votes	%
Conservative	S. Gordon	903	54.1
Liberal Democrats	F.J. Davies	386	23.1
Labour	G.A. Reid	280	16.8
SNP	A.A. Tuttle	101	6.0
Majority		517	
Turnout			44.7

Ward 28: Seafield
Party	Candidate	Votes	%
Conservative	M.C. Hastie	1,340	74.2
SNP	J. Smith	234	12.9
Labour	A. Flockhart	230	12.7
Majority		1106	
Turnout			46.2

Ward 29: Ashley
Party	Candidate	Votes	%
Conservative	R. Gallagher	663	57.8
Labour	E.M. Thomson	197	17.2
SNP	K.S.A. Johnston	149	13.0
Liberal Democrats	A.G.L. Keith	139	12.1
Majority		466	
Turnout			32.4

Ward 30: Broomhill
Party	Candidate	Votes	%
Conservative	J.W. Graham	793	61.6
Labour	A.F. MacDonald	325	25.3
SNP	R. Colvin	168	13.8
Majority		468	
Turnout			38.2

Ward 31: Gairn
Party	Candidate	Votes	%
Conservative	D.W. Ritchie	498	44.8
Labour	B.S. Begg	345	31.0
SNP	R.A. McKay	159	14.3
Liberal Democrats	L.K. Reid	109	9.8
Majority		153	
Turnout			31.8

Ward 32: Duthie
Party	Candidate	Votes	%
Conservative	J.A. Donnelly	423	38.3
Liberal Democrats	A. McG Bisset	351	31.8
Labour	M.E. Stewart	214	19.4
SNP	G. Williamson	115	10.4
Majority		72	
Turnout			32.1

Ward 33: Victoria
Party	Candidate	Votes	%
Labour	Y. Allan	414	53.6
SNP	R. McE Robertson	169	21.9
Conservative	S.D. Geddes	143	18.5
Liberal Democrats	J.A. Catto	46	6.0
Majority		245	
Turnout			25.2

Ward 34: Glenbervie
Party	Candidate	Votes	%
Labour	A.E. Dow	505	62.0
SNP	J. Mack Ogg	165	20.0
Conservative	M. Melville	120	14.7
Liberal Democrats	R.M. Sutherland	24	2.9
Majority		340	
Turnout			30.2

Ward 35: Mannofield
Party	Candidate	Votes	%
Liberal Democrats	E.S. Massie	921	50.8
Conservative	E.B. Deans	797	44.0
Labour	T.W. Begg	90	5.0
Majority		124	
Turnout			48.9

Ward 36: Cults
Party	Candidate	Votes	%
Conservative	N.L.M. Milne	1,103	65.3
Liberal Democrats	S. Watt	536	31.7
Labour	S.S. Henderson	50	3.0
Majority		567	
Turnout			47.4

Ward 37: Bridge of Dee
Party	Candidate	Votes	%
Liberal Democrats	S. Ness	865	71.2
Labour	J.N. Keay	339	27.9
Majority		526	
Turnout			41.4

Ward 38: Garthdee
Party	Candidate	Votes	%
Labour	R.D. Ray	429	43.9
Liberal Democrats	I.G. Yuill	235	24.1
SNP	S.H. MacL Joss	206	21.1
Conservative	M.B. Meek	106	10.8
Majority		194	
Turnout			38.6

Ward 39: Abbotswell
Party	Candidate	Votes	%
Labour	D.E. Clyne	719	67.6
Liberal Democrats	S.D. Garland	341	32.1
Majority		378	
Turnout			32.8

Ward 40: Cairngorm
Party	Candidate	Votes	%
Labour	G. Urquhart	809	71.1
Liberal Democrats	S. Stephen	324	28.5
Majority		485	
Turnout			34.1

Ward 41: Balnagask
Party	Candidate	Votes	%
Labour	A.P. MacLean	518	69.4
SNP	P. Martin	219	29.4
Majority		299	
Turnout			25.6

Ward 42: Loirston
Party	Candidate	Votes	%
Liberal Democrats	I. Keith	772	48.3
SNP	E.D. McCabe	327	20.5
Conservative	D.J. Campbell	259	16.2
Labour	S.M. Rae	239	15.0
Majority		445	
Turnout			34.6

Ward 43: Bieldside
Party	Candidate	Votes	%
Liberal Democrats	B. Fenwick	1,047	53.7
Conservative	P.C. De Kock	780	40.0
SNP	G.T. Smith	74	3.8
Labour	H. Gibbs	43	2.2
Majority		267	
Turnout			46.5

Ward 44: Culter
Party	Candidate	Votes	%
Liberal Democrats	P. MacDonald	867	47.0
Conservative	F.L.P. Fouin	836	45.3
Labour	C. Gibbs	73	4.0
SNP	F.C. Ahrens	68	3.7
Majority		31	
Turnout			49.5

Ward 45: Dyce North
Party	Candidate	Votes	%
Liberal Democrats	R. Clark	693	61.9
Labour	D. Montgomerie	315	28.5
SNP	G. Insh	109	9.7
Majority		378	
Turnout			37.0

Ward 46: Dyce South
Party	Candidate	Votes	%
Liberal Democrats	R.W. Hutcheon	800	79.5
Labour	D. Duncan	198	19.7
Majority		602	
Turnout			27.3

Ward 47: Newhills East
Party	Candidate	Votes	%
Labour	B. Rattray	373	53.9
SNP	A.M.G. Diack	119	17.2
Conservative	A. MacKenzie	114	16.5
Liberal Democrats	J. Laszlo	86	12.4
Majority		254	
Turnout			26.7

Ward 48: Newhills West
Party	Candidate	Votes	%
Liberal Democrats	J. Anderson	683	40.0
Conservative	P. Cook	537	31.5
Labour	G. Farquhar	485	28.5
Majority		146	
Turnout			43.4

Ward 49: Donmouth
Party	Candidate	Votes	%
Liberal Democrats	S.R. Reid	744	48.9
SNP	M. Jaffrey	387	25.4
Labour	J. Third	384	25.2
Majority		357	
Turnout			30.8

Ward 50: Danestone
Party	Candidate	Votes	%
Liberal Democrats	J.W.M. Logan	772	61.7
Labour	D.C. Davidson	272	21.7
SNP	M.A. McKessick	201	16.1
Majority		500	
Turnout			29.6

Ward 51: Middleton
Party	Candidate	Votes	%
Liberal Democrats	D. Pearce	855	63.0
Labour	M. Henderson	269	19.8
SNP	I. Hunter	229	16.9
Majority		586	
Turnout			29.3

Ward 52: Oldmachar
Party	Candidate	Votes	%
Liberal Democrats	J.M. Reynolds	402	64.5
Labour	J. Tuckwell	119	19.1
SNP	K.J. Whyte	97	15.6
Majority		283	
Turnout			24.3
