= 1988 City of Aberdeen District Council election =

1988 Scottish local government election

← 1984	5 May 1988	1992 →

All 52 seats to City of Aberdeen Council 27 seats needed for a majority

	First party	Second party
Party	Labour	SSLD
Last election	28 seats, 40.7%	14 seats, 33.6%
Seats won	28	14
Seat change	0	0
Popular vote	32,697	18,600
Percentage	45.1%	25.6%
Swing	▲4.4%	▼8.0%
	Third party	Fourth party
Party	Conservative	SNP
Last election	8 seats, 21.8%	0 seats, 3.7%
Seats won	9	1
Seat change	▲1	▲1
Popular vote	13,220	6,806
Percentage	18.2%	9.4%
Swing	▼3.6%	▲5.7%
- The 52 single-member wards
Council Leader before election
Labour
Council Leader after election
Labour

The 1988 City of Aberdeen District Council election took place on 5 May 1988 to elect members of City of Aberdeen Council, as part of that year's Scottish local elections.

== Election results ==
City of Aberdeen local election result 1988
Party	Seats	Gains	Losses	Net gain/loss	Seats %	Votes %	Votes	+/−
Labour	28	0	0	0	53.8	45.1	32,697	▲4.4
SSLD	14	0	0	0	26.9	25.6	18,600	▼8.0
Conservative	9	▲1	0	▲1	17.3	18.2	13,220	▼3.6
SNP	1	▲1	0	▲1	1.9	9.4	6,806	▲5.7
SDP	0	0	0	0	0.0	1.4	1,037	New
Green	0	0	0	0	0.0	0.2	150	0.0
Communist	0	0	0	0	0.0	0.0	26	New
Students' Charity Show	0	0	0	0	0.0	0.0	20	New

== Ward results ==
Ward 1: Grandholm
Party	Candidate	Votes	%
Labour	C. Massie	473	42.0
SSLD	S. Wainman	437	38.8
SNP	T.B. Stewart	134	11.9
Conservative	E.M.M. Cockburn	81	7.2
Majority		36	
Turnout			37.9

Ward 2: Tillydrone
Party	Candidate	Votes	%
Labour	J. Wyness	911	77.3
SNP	A. Robertson	174	14.8
SDP	G.V. Banks	54	4.6
Conservative	C.H. Goddard	37	3.1
Majority		737	
Turnout			36.1

Ward 3: Old Aberdeen
Party	Candidate	Votes	%
Labour	A.H. Sharp	647	52.8
SSLD	F. McCallum	426	34.7
SNP	M.K. Meldrum	93	7.6
Conservative	D.G. Morgan	59	4.8
Majority		221	
Turnout			42.2

Ward 4: Sunnybank
Party	Candidate	Votes	%
Labour	M.E. Smith	699	54.9
SSLD	A. McL Knox	347	27.3
SNP	H.J. Gowers	145	11.4
Conservative	D.G.J. Coles	81	6.4
Majority		352	
Turnout			38.4

Ward 5: Middlefield
Party	Candidate	Votes	%
SNP	B.J. Adam	544	51.0
Labour	R.R. Webster	450	42.2
SSLD	D. Bain	44	4.1
Conservative	K.C. Longmore	26	2.4
Majority		94	
Turnout			39.1

Ward 6: Cummings Park
Party	Candidate	Votes	%
Labour	M.E. Farquhar	837	69.6
SNP	A. Guild	291	24.2
SSLD	J.B. Oates	41	3.4
Conservative	N.D. Lennox-Trewren	33	2.7
Majority		546	
Turnout			40.9

Ward 7: Marchburn
Party	Candidate	Votes	%
Labour	N. Cooney	742	52.1
SNP	R.G.W. Mundie	520	36.5
SSLD	J. Sim	103	7.2
Conservative	J. Wokoma	59	4.1
Majority		222	
Turnout			41.6

Ward 8: Springhill
Party	Candidate	Votes	%
Labour	D.P. Durward	782	48.1
SNP	P.B. Greenhorn	753	46.3
Conservative	K.A. Scanlan	57	3.5
SSLD	H.I. McKenzie	31	1.9
Majority		29	
Turnout			53.2

Ward 9: Hilton
Party	Candidate	Votes	%
Labour	E.H. Kelly	742	49.2
SDP	C.P. Britt	456	30.2
SNP	P. Alexander	197	13.1
Conservative	D.A. Parsons	111	7.4
Majority		286	
Turnout			46.9

Ward 10: Cattofield
Party	Candidate	Votes	%
SSLD	O.B. Rutherford	941	55.1
Labour	R. McKay	484	28.3
Conservative	J.M.R. Donaldson	159	9.3
SNP	J. Noble	123	7.2
Majority		457	
Turnout			47.8

Ward 11: Balgownie
Party	Candidate	Votes	%
Labour	A. Stevely	510	40.9
SSLD	D.M. Falchikov	423	33.9
SNP	T.A. Walker	175	14.0
Green	R.A. Dunham	78	6.3
Conservative	M. MacK Fraser	60	4.8
Majority		87	
Turnout			39.7

Ward 12: Linksfield
Party	Candidate	Votes	%
Labour	R.A. Robertson	1,179	78.0
SNP	I. Hughes	145	9.6
Conservative	S.P. Redgrave	95	6.3
SSLD	P. Tait	88	5.8
Majority		1034	
Turnout			47.9

Ward 13: Quarryhill
Party	Candidate	Votes	%
Labour	R.G. Milne	1,056	77.1
SNP	D. McK Jamieson	196	14.3
Conservative	A. McL Johnston	67	4.9
SSLD	D. Stewart	50	3.6
Majority		860	
Turnout			46.0

Ward 14: Muirfield
Party	Candidate	Votes	%
Labour	W.J. Fraser	944	79.4
SNP	M.M. Munro	126	10.6
SSLD	I. Gray	61	5.1
Conservative	M.C.V. Hey	55	4.6
Majority		818	
Turnout			43.0

Ward 15: Stockethill
Party	Candidate	Votes	%
Labour	T. Paine	1,217	77.9
SNP	C.D. Ross	160	10.2
Conservative	I. Simpson	92	5.9
SSLD	S.J. Simpson	90	5.8
Majority		1057	
Turnout			46.8

Ward 16: Westburn
Party	Candidate	Votes	%
Labour	J. Wood	646	55.2
SSLD	S.L. Kirkwood	250	21.3
Conservative	A.E.R. McKenzie	167	14.3
SNP	L.M. Anderson	106	9.1
Majority		396	
Turnout			38.9

Ward 17: Sheddocksley
Party	Candidate	Votes	%
Labour	H.E. Rae	1,084	80.1
SNP	M. Robb	145	10.7
Conservative	V. Redgrave	65	4.8
SSLD	M.C. Allen	57	4.2
Majority		939	
Turnout			44.2

Ward 18: Summerhill
Party	Candidate	Votes	%
Labour	M.K. Savidge	811	66.4
SNP	M.G. Smith	190	15.6
Conservative	J.N. Paton	110	9.0
SSLD	N.D. Fletcher	84	6.9
Communist	J.B. O'Loan	26	2.1
Majority		621	
Turnout			39.0

Ward 19: Midstocket
Party	Candidate	Votes	%
Conservative	G.C. Adams	800	46.1
SSLD	F.J. Hepburn	544	31.4
Labour	C. Thomson	382	22.0
Majority		256	
Turnout			52.1

Ward 20: Argyll
Party	Candidate	Votes	%
Labour	A.J. Forrest	599	48.1
Conservative	W.J. McCafferty	277	22.2
SSLD	A. Wallace	250	20.1
SNP	A. Nimmo	118	9.5
Majority		322	
Turnout			41.4

Ward 21: Harlaw
Party	Candidate	Votes	%
Conservative	S.L.A. Reith	599	46.1
SDP	I. Cormack	465	35.8
Labour	S.J. Stott	232	17.8
Majority		134	
Turnout			41.6

Ward 22: Queens Cross
Party	Candidate	Votes	%
Conservative	R.D.I. Anderson	790	60.9
Labour	D.A. Glen	274	21.1
SSLD	D. MacLauchlan	213	16.4
Students' Charity Show	S. Rhind	20	1.5
Majority		516	
Turnout			39.8

Ward 23: Pittodrie
Party	Candidate	Votes	%
Labour	N.L. Bonney	970	78.5
SSLD	A. McG Bisset	160	13.0
Conservative	W. McD Morrison	92	7.4
Majority		810	
Turnout			33.4

Ward 24: Castlehill
Party	Candidate	Votes	%
Labour	A.C. Collie	745	76.2
SNP	A. Strain	104	10.6
Conservative	J.D. McLaren	77	7.9
SSLD	J. Quarterman	52	5.3
Majority		641	
Turnout			35.1

Ward 25: Causewayend
Party	Candidate	Votes	%
Labour	C.H. Clevitt	654	65.8
SNP	L.W. Sutherland	167	16.8
SSLD	A. Lawson	88	8.9
Conservative	T.G. Mason	85	8.6
Majority		487	
Turnout			34.4

Ward 26: Denburn
Party	Candidate	Votes	%
Labour	J. Buchan	692	78.2
Conservative	G.R. Smyth	96	10.8
SSLD	J.H.R. Heuch	93	10.5
Majority		596	
Turnout			36.0

Ward 27: Fernielea
Party	Candidate	Votes	%
Conservative	A. McRae	713	40.0
SSLD	R.L. MacKinnon	597	33.5
Labour	B.A. Gemmell	472	26.5
Majority		116	
Turnout			47.0

Ward 28: Seafield
Party	Candidate	Votes	%
Conservative	M.C. Hastie	1,215	57.8
SSLD	T.D. Kelly	644	30.6
Labour	A. Flockhart	241	11.5
Majority		571	
Turnout			53.7

Ward 29: Ashley
Party	Candidate	Votes	%
Conservative	R. Gallagher	699	51.0
Labour	J.C. Stocks	400	29.2
SSLD	E.M. Watt	263	19.2
Majority		299	
Turnout			35.4

Ward 30: Broomhill
Party	Candidate	Votes	%
Conservative	J.W. Graham	709	48.0
Labour	A.F. Macdonald	409	27.7
SSLD	L.K. Reid	355	24.0
Majority		300	
Turnout			42.4

Ward 31: Gairn
Party	Candidate	Votes	%
Conservative	J.G.A. Wisely	645	46.1
Labour	R. Buchan	481	34.4
SNP	R.M. Anderson	148	10.6
SSLD	J.D. Alexander	123	8.8
Majority		164	
Turnout			40.3
