= 2003 Aberdeen City Council election =

2003 Scottish local government election

← 1999	1 May 2003	2007 →

All 43 seats to Aberdeen City Council 22 seats needed for a majority

	First party	Second party
Party	Liberal Democrats	Labour
Last election	12 seats, 25.5%	22 seats, 31.9%
Seats won	20	14
Seat change	▲8	▼8
Popular vote	26,990	18,456
Percentage	35.4%	24.2%
Swing	▲9.9%	▼7.7%
	Third party	Fourth party
Party	SNP	Conservative
Last election	3 seats, 25.1%	6 seats, 17.3%
Seats won	6	3
Seat change	▲3	▼3
Popular vote	17,522	11,690
Percentage	23.0%	15.3%
Swing	▼2.1%	▼2.0%
- The 43 single-member wards
Council Leader before election
Labour
Council Leader after election
No overall control

The 2003 Aberdeen City Council election took place on 1 May 2003 to elect members of Aberdeen City Council. The election was the last one using the established 43 single member wards using the plurality (first past the post), before the Local Governance (Scotland) Act 2004.

The results saw the council turn from Labour control to no overall control, with the Liberal Democrats being the largest party.

== Election results ==
Aberdeen City local election result 2003
Party	Seats	Gains	Losses	Net gain/loss	Seats %	Votes %	Votes	+/−
Liberal Democrats	20			▲8	46.5	35.4	26,990	▲9.9
Labour	14			▼8	32.6	24.2	18,456	▼7.7
SNP	6			▲3	14.0	23.0	17,522	▼2.1
Conservative	3			▼3	7.0	15.3	11,690	▼2.0
Scottish Socialist	0			0	0.0	1.7	1,269	New
Independent	0			0	0.0	0.5	376	▲0.3
National Front	0			0	0.0	0.1	44	New

== Ward results ==
Ward 1: Dyce
Party	Candidate	Votes	%
Liberal Democrats	R. Clark	1,070	55.6
SNP	K.J. Turnbull	400	20.8
Labour	P. D'Arcy	327	17.0
Conservative	A. Carruthers	128	6.6
Majority		670	
Turnout			50

Ward 2: Bankhead/Stoneywood
Party	Candidate	Votes	%
Labour	B. Rattray	695	34.6
Liberal Democrats	G.J.E. Penny	570	28.4
SNP	W. Stuart	369	18.4
Conservative	A.E.R. MacKenzie	215	10.7
Independent	P.R. Wright	159	7.9
Majority		125	
Turnout			50.5
Labour gain from Liberal Democrats			

Ward 3: Danestone
Party	Candidate	Votes	%
Liberal Democrats	R.W. Hutcheon	861	45.6
SNP	D.S. Falconer	531	28.1
Labour	I.K.M. Mozibul	278	14.7
Conservative	C.A.M. Maggetti	218	11.5
Majority		330	
Turnout			46.3

Ward 4: Jesmond
Party	Candidate	Votes	%
Liberal Democrats	G.A. Leslie	934	43.7
SNP	A. Angus	628	29.4
Labour	M. Malik	425	19.9
Conservative	S.C. Robertson	149	7.0
Majority		306	
Turnout			51.0

Ward 5: Oldmachar
Party	Candidate	Votes	%
Liberal Democrats	J.M. Reynolds	978	52.2
SNP	A. Stuart	479	25.6
Labour	M. Martin	282	15.1
Conservative	D.L. Stephens	133	7.1
Majority		499	
Turnout			46.2

Ward 6: Bridge of Don
Party	Candidate	Votes	%
Liberal Democrats	M. McLeod	795	38.5
SNP	I. Hunter	597	28.9
Labour	M.E. Stewart	438	21.2
Conservative	J.N. Gifford	235	11.4
Majority		198	
Turnout			53.4

Ward 7: Donmouth
Party	Candidate	Votes	%
SNP	M. Jaffrey	601	45.1
Liberal Democrats	A. Anderson	305	22.9
Labour	J. Tuckwell	245	18.4
Conservative	B.G. Davidson	183	13.7
Majority		296	
Turnout			38.8

Ward 8: Newhills
Party	Candidate	Votes	%
Liberal Democrats	P.J. Stephen	1,432	62.2
SNP	N.J.L. Russell	326	14.2
Conservative	A. Wood	282	12.2
Labour	M.M. Scott	263	11.4
Majority		1106	
Turnout			51.4
Liberal Democrats gain from Labour			

Ward 9: Auchmill
Party	Candidate	Votes	%
SNP	K. Stewart	868	57.1
Labour	A. Flockhart	412	27.1
Liberal Democrats	F. McCallum	153	10.1
Conservative	P.C. Wokoma	87	5.7
Majority		456	
Turnout			42.0

Ward 10: Cummings Park
Party	Candidate	Votes	%
Labour	G. Graham	765	46.1
SNP	P.E. Calder	700	42.1
Liberal Democrats	D. Pearce	142	8.5
Conservative	A.J. Ross	54	3.3
Majority		65	
Turnout			44.6

Ward 11: Springhill
Party	Candidate	Votes	%
SNP	K.A. Shirron	875	55.5
Labour	J. Innes	539	34.2
Liberal Democrats	C.J. Smith	101	6.4
Conservative	G.M. Ross	62	3.9
Majority		336	
Turnout			44.8

Ward 12: Mastrick
Party	Candidate	Votes	%
Labour	R. Milne	848	45.3
SNP	J.E.E. Dunbar	725	38.7
Liberal Democrats	S. Stephen	167	8.9
Conservative	S. Murray	69	3.7
Scottish Socialist	J. Currie	64	3.4
Majority		123	
Turnout			48.8

Ward 13: Sheddocksley
Party	Candidate	Votes	%
Labour	J.A. Lamond	776	43.8
SNP	G. Stuart	569	32.1
Liberal Democrats	I. Duncan	342	19.3
Conservative	C.J. Thomson	84	4.7
Majority		207	
Turnout			45.8

Ward 14: Summerhill
Party	Candidate	Votes	%
Labour	L. Ironside	589	35.7
SNP	D.F. Grattan	506	30.7
Liberal Democrats	J.J. Cruickshank	344	20.9
Conservative	A. Harper	209	12.7
Majority		83	
Turnout			46.9

Ward 15: Hilton
Party	Candidate	Votes	%
Labour	G. Adam	654	40.6
SNP	M. Nicol	556	34.5
Liberal Democrats	S. Wainman	302	18.7
Conservative	K.M. Scott	100	6.2
Majority		98	
Turnout			44.9

Ward 16: Woodside/Tillydrone
Party	Candidate	Votes	%
SNP	A.D. Gowers	480	35.7
Labour	I.J. Hadden	457	34.0
Liberal Democrats	W.K. Mackie	253	18.8
Conservative	F.G. Taylor	100	7.4
Independent	C.W. Balfour	45	3.3
Independent	S.S. Campbell	11	0.8
Majority		23	
Turnout			42.0
SNP gain from Labour			

Ward 17: St. Machar
Party	Candidate	Votes	%
Labour	S.M. Macdonald	348	31.5
SNP	H. Gowers	333	30.2
Liberal Democrats	K. Adebayo	256	23.2
Conservative	K.M.A. Murray	94	8.5
Scottish Socialist	H. Rafferty	73	6.6
Majority		15	
Turnout			38.1

Ward 18: Seaton
Party	Candidate	Votes	%
Labour	N. Collie	503	35.5
SNP	J. Noble	421	29.7
Independent	H.H. MacKay	161	11.4
Liberal Democrats	M. McKenzie	124	8.8
Scottish Socialist	K. McGovern	111	7.8
Conservative	I. Simpson	53	3.7
National Front	D. MacDonald	44	3.1
Majority		82	
Turnout			42.1

Ward 19: Kittybrewster
Party	Candidate	Votes	%
Liberal Democrats	N.D. Fletcher	867	46.9
Labour	C.K. Pirie	523	28.3
SNP	D.J. McClure	332	18.0
Conservative	G.S. Sutherland	125	6.8
Majority		344	
Turnout			46.4
Liberal Democrats gain from Labour			

Ward 20: Stockethill
Party	Candidate	Votes	%
Labour	J.R. Lamond	761	41.7
SNP	G.C. Graham	430	23.6
Liberal Democrats	K.A.E. Marr	387	21.2
Conservative	K.H. Brookes	156	8.6
Scottish Socialist	C.M. Chandler	90	4.9
Majority		331	
Turnout			51.3

Ward 21: Berryden
Party	Candidate	Votes	%
Liberal Democrats	J.D. Stewart	491	36.5
Labour	E.M. Harris	394	29.3
SNP	C.E. Little	368	27.3
Conservative	F.K.S. Lawson	94	7.0
Majority		97	
Turnout			35.2
Liberal Democrats gain from Labour			

Ward 22: Sunnybank
Party	Candidate	Votes	%
SNP	A. May	472	32.9
Labour	S.M. Rae	440	30.7
Liberal Democrats	J. Gordon	299	20.8
Conservative	A. Morrison	116	8.1
Scottish Socialist	D.A.F. Rowan	108	7.5
Majority		32	
Turnout			42.5
SNP gain from Labour			

Ward 23: Pittodrie
Party	Candidate	Votes	%
Labour	R.R. Webster	498	40.6
SNP	M.A. Chaudry	292	23.8
Liberal Democrats	R.B. Robertson	273	22.2
Conservative	S.L.A. Reith	85	6.9
Scottish Socialist	B. Dunn	80	6.5
Majority		206	
Turnout			35.7

Ward 24: Midstocket
Party	Candidate	Votes	%
Conservative	J.A. Porter	1,315	58.6
Liberal Democrats	P. Tait	368	16.4
Labour	E.J. Fowler	325	14.5
SNP	C.D. Ross	236	10.5
Majority		947	
Turnout			55.3

Ward 25: Queens Cross
Party	Candidate	Votes	%
Conservative	J.A. Dempsey	792	44.2
Liberal Democrats	E. Brown	644	36.0
Labour	J.M. King	192	10.7
SNP	F. Nimmo	163	9.1
Majority		148	
Turnout			49.6

Ward 26: Gilcomston
Party	Candidate	Votes	%
Liberal Democrats	A.F. Smith	733	50.1
Labour	J. Crockett	277	18.9
SNP	N.J. Gethins	255	17.4
Conservative	J. Gordon	151	10.3
Scottish Socialist	A. Liversedge	46	3.1
Majority		456	
Turnout			44.4
Liberal Democrats gain from Labour			

Ward 27: Langstane
Party	Candidate	Votes	%
Liberal Democrats	S. Delaney	631	50.7
SNP	D. Buyers	306	24.6
Labour	J. McLeod	214	17.2
Conservative	R.A. Gordon	93	7.5
Majority		325	
Turnout			31.5
Liberal Democrats gain from Labour			

Ward 28: Castlehill
Party	Candidate	Votes	%
Labour	J. Hunter	442	37.2
SNP	L.D. Nicholson	335	28.2
Liberal Democrats	E.C.P. Skinner	192	16.2
Conservative	G.O. Kennedy	109	9.2
Scottish Socialist	G. Mackie	109	9.2
Majority		107	
Turnout			35.2

Ward 29: Hazlehead
Party	Candidate	Votes	%
Liberal Democrats	K. Freel	1,204	53.3
Conservative	S. Gordon	609	26.9
Labour	W.J. Stuart	252	11.2
SNP	A.H. Muir	195	8.6
Majority		595	
Turnout			61.9
Liberal Democrats gain from Conservative			

Ward 30: Peterculter
Party	Candidate	Votes	%
Liberal Democrats	P. MacDonald	1,164	58.7
Labour	D.J. Wood	291	14.7
Conservative	A. Ferguson	264	13.3
SNP	D.W. Bain	263	13.3
Majority		873	
Turnout			51.7

Ward 31: Murtle
Party	Candidate	Votes	%
Liberal Democrats	M.R. Duncan	1,537	64.4
Conservative	A. Wallace	621	26.0
Labour	W. Coull	130	5.4
SNP	P.E. Taylor	99	4.1
Majority		916	
Turnout			55.9

Ward 32: Cults
Party	Candidate	Votes	%
Liberal Democrats	A.J. Malone	1,287	53.4
Conservative	A.D. Milne	881	36.5
Labour	L. Taylor	126	5.2
SNP	H.M. Shepherd	117	4.9
Majority		406	
Turnout			61.6
Liberal Democrats gain from Conservative			

Ward 33: Mannofield
Party	Candidate	Votes	%
Conservative	J.G.A. Wisely	1,761	70.7
Liberal Democrats	A.C. McGovern	328	13.2
Labour	E. Hunter	224	9.0
SNP	R.I.K. Kiddie	177	7.1
Majority		1433	
Turnout			60.2

Ward 34: Ashley
Party	Candidate	Votes	%
Liberal Democrats	M. Greig	1,002	56.3
Conservative	A.A. Harvey	355	19.9
Labour	M.A. King	230	12.9
SNP	K. Lamont	193	10.8
Majority		647	
Turnout			48.5
Liberal Democrats gain from Conservative			

Ward 35: Broomhill
Party	Candidate	Votes	%
Liberal Democrats	I. Yuill	1,422	60.6
Conservative	F. Forsyth	434	18.5
Labour	A. Benzie	224	9.6
SNP	M.L. Grant	187	8.0
Scottish Socialist	A.F. MacDonald	78	3.3
Majority		988	
Turnout			59.7

Ward 36: Garthdee
Party	Candidate	Votes	%
Liberal Democrats	G.S. Cassie	1,039	57.6
Labour	T.D. Harris	349	19.3
SNP	S.H.M. Forbes	266	14.7
Conservative	A.J. Weir	81	4.5
Scottish Socialist	T. Paterson	69	3.8
Majority		690	
Turnout			48.8

Ward 37: Holburn
Party	Candidate	Votes	%
Liberal Democrats	D.R. Falconer	907	48.6
Labour	M. Tuckwell	342	18.3
Conservative	W. Berry	326	17.5
SNP	R. McE Robertson	206	11.0
Scottish Socialist	R. Harper	87	4.7
Majority		565	
Turnout			49.1

Ward 38: Duthie
Party	Candidate	Votes	%
Liberal Democrats	I.S. Cormack	717	42.1
Conservative	J.A. Donnelly	417	24.5
Labour	W.A. McIntosh	333	19.6
SNP	S. West	181	10.6
Scottish Socialist	K.D. Farnsworth	55	3.2
Majority		300	
Turnout			45.4
Liberal Democrats gain from Labour			

Ward 39: Torry
Party	Candidate	Votes	%
Labour	Y. Allan	576	38.7
SNP	B.I. Kerr	549	36.8
Liberal Democrats	I.M. MacLeod	279	18.7
Conservative	J.M. Duncan	86	5.8
Majority		27	
Turnout			43.6

Ward 40: Tullos
Party	Candidate	Votes	%
SNP	J. Kiddie	549	38.9
Labour	C. Kelly	539	38.2
Liberal Democrats	B.J. Dean	233	16.5
Scottish Socialist	S-J L. Moll	91	6.4
Majority		10	
Turnout			38.8
SNP gain from Labour			

Ward 41: Kincorth West
Party	Candidate	Votes	%
Labour	D.E. Clyne	823	40.9
Liberal Democrats	M. Cassie	528	26.3
SNP	S. Elsey	457	22.7
Conservative	T. Rossiter	125	6.2
Scottish Socialist	I. Milton	78	3.9
Majority		295	
Turnout			51.1

Ward 42: Kincorth East
Party	Candidate	Votes	%
Labour	G. Urquhart	756	40.1
SNP	P. Yule	581	30.9
Liberal Democrats	A.M. Bisset	358	19.0
Conservative	J.J. Wylde	112	5.9
Scottish Socialist	A.A. Falconer	76	4.0
Majority		175	
Turnout			51.6

Ward 43: Loirston
Party	Candidate	Votes	%
Liberal Democrats	K.M. Dean	1,024	53.8
Labour	A.D. Neill	351	18.4
SNP	A. McCabe	349	18.3
Conservative	L. Dewar	126	6.6
Scottish Socialist	D. Watt	54	2.8
Majority		673	
Turnout			43.6
