= 1995 City of Aberdeen Council election =

1995 Scottish local government election

| ← 1992 | 6 April 1995 | 1999 → |

All 50 seats to City of Aberdeen Council 26 seats needed for a majority

| | First party | Second party |
|---|---|---|
| Party | Labour | Liberal Democrats |
| Last election | 27 seats, 34.8% | 13 seats, 25.6% |
| Seats won | 30 | 10 |
| Seat change | ▲3 | ▼3 |
| Popular vote | 27,116 | 15,461 |
| Percentage | 42.0% | 23.9% |
| Swing | ▲7.2% | ▼1.7% |
| | Third party | Fourth party |
| Party | Conservative | SNP |
| Last election | 10 seats, 23.6% | 2 seats, 15.6% |
| Seats won | 9 | 1 |
| Seat change | ▼1 | ▼1 |
| Popular vote | 9,303 | 11,729 |
| Percentage | 14.4% | 18.1% |
| Swing | ▼9.2% | ▲2.5% |
- The 50 single-member wards
Council Leader before election
Labour
Council Leader after election
Labour

The 1995 City of Aberdeen Council election took place on 6 April 1995 to elect members of City of Aberdeen Council. The Council would later change its name on 9 May to become "Aberdeen City Council."

The results saw Labour retain its control of the council, with an increased majority of seats.

== Election results ==
City of Aberdeen local election result 1995
| Party | Seats | Gains | Losses | Net gain/loss | Seats % | Votes % | Votes | +/− |
|---|---|---|---|---|---|---|---|---|
| Labour | 30 | | | ▲3 | 60.0 | 42.0 | 27,116 | ▲7.2 |
| Liberal Democrats | 10 | | | ▼3 | 20.0 | 23.9 | 15,461 | ▼1.7 |
| Conservative | 9 | | | ▼1 | 18.0 | 14.4 | 9,303 | ▼9.2 |
| SNP | 1 | | | ▼1 | 2.0 | 18.1 | 11,729 | ▲2.5 |
| Independent | 0 | | | 0 | 0.0 | 0.8 | 549 | New |
| Independent Labour | 0 | | | 0 | 0.0 | 0.6 | 370 | ▲0.2 |
| Ind. Conservative | 0 | | | 0 | 0.0 | 0.2 | 99 | New |

== Ward results ==
Ward 1: Dyce
| Party | Candidate | Votes | % |
|---|---|---|---|
| Liberal Democrats | R.W. Hutcheon | 478 | 42.6 |
| Labour | P. D'Arcy | 346 | 30.8 |
| SNP | J.E.E. Dunbar | 197 | 17.5 |
| Conservative | A.E.R. MacKenzie | 102 | 9.1 |
| Majority | | 132 | |
| Turnout | | | 33.6 |

Ward 2: Pitmedden
| Party | Candidate | Votes | % |
|---|---|---|---|
| Liberal Democrats | R. Clark | 692 | 61.5 |
| Labour | A.G. Collins | 250 | 22.2 |
| SNP | S.M. Gowers | 141 | 12.5 |
| Conservative | R. Crombie | 43 | 3.8 |
| Majority | | 442 | |
| Turnout | | | 36.8 |

Ward 3: Persley
| Party | Candidate | Votes | % |
|---|---|---|---|
| Liberal Democrats | J.W.M. Logan | 666 | 64.0 |
| SNP | D.S. Falconer | 180 | 17.3 |
| Labour | T.W. Begg | 136 | 13.1 |
| Conservative | D.L. Stephens | 59 | 5.7 |
| Majority | | 486 | |
| Turnout | | | 35.0 |

Ward 4: Braehead
| Party | Candidate | Votes | % |
|---|---|---|---|
| Labour | S.M. Rae | 440 | 39.5 |
| Liberal Democrats | D.B.A. Pearce | 411 | 36.9 |
| SNP | A.J. MacFarlane | 188 | 16.9 |
| Conservative | S. Wright | 76 | 6.8 |
| Majority | | 29 | |
| Turnout | | | 34.7 |

Ward 5: Oldmachar
| Party | Candidate | Votes | % |
|---|---|---|---|
| Liberal Democrats | J.M. Reynolds | 540 | 49.0 |
| Labour | A.W. Benzie | 275 | 25.0 |
| SNP | A.B.G. Bates | 228 | 20.7 |
| Conservative | D.A. Parsons | 59 | 5.4 |
| Majority | | 265 | |
| Turnout | | | 30.9 |

Ward 6: Jesmond
| Party | Candidate | Votes | % |
|---|---|---|---|
| Labour | C.K. Pirie | 397 | 35.9 |
| Liberal Democrats | G.A. Leslie | 286 | 25.8 |
| Independent | D.S. Smith | 267 | 24.1 |
| SNP | R.M.M. Buchan | 157 | 14.2 |
| Majority | | 111 | |
| Turnout | | | 36.8 |

Ward 7: Denmore
| Party | Candidate | Votes | % |
|---|---|---|---|
| Liberal Democrats | S.R. Reid | 383 | 39.4 |
| Labour | J.M. King | 294 | 30.2 |
| SNP | P.W. Scott-Wilson | 196 | 20.2 |
| Ind. Conservative | B.G. Davidson | 99 | 10.2 |
| Majority | | 89 | |
| Turnout | | | 35.0 |

Ward 8: Donmouth
| Party | Candidate | Votes | % |
|---|---|---|---|
| Labour | M. Tuckwell | 384 | 42.0 |
| Independent | H.H. MacKay | 185 | 20.2 |
| Liberal Democrats | H.C. Reynolds | 176 | 19.3 |
| SNP | M. Jaffrey | 169 | 18.5 |
| Majority | | 199 | |
| Turnout | | | 26.6 |

Ward 9: Newhills
| Party | Candidate | Votes | % |
|---|---|---|---|
| Liberal Democrats | J. Anderson | 777 | 48.6 |
| Labour | G. Farquhar | 428 | 26.8 |
| Conservative | J. Gordon | 169 | 10.6 |
| SNP | P.E. Calder | 128 | 8.0 |
| Independent | D.W. Martin | 97 | 6.1 |
| Majority | | 349 | |
| Turnout | | | 39.5 |

Ward 10: Bucksburn
| Party | Candidate | Votes | % |
|---|---|---|---|
| Labour | B. Rattray | 583 | 47.7 |
| Liberal Democrats | P.J. Stephen | 489 | 40.0 |
| SNP | A.M.G. Diack | 108 | 8.8 |
| Conservative | M.E. MacGinn | 41 | 3.4 |
| Majority | | 94 | |
| Turnout | | | 43.5 |

Ward 11: Middlefield & Heathryfold
| Party | Candidate | Votes | % |
|---|---|---|---|
| SNP | B.J. Adam | 834 | 69.7 |
| Labour | J.N. Keay | 342 | 28.6 |
| Liberal Democrats | S.M. Rennie | 21 | 1.8 |
| Majority | | 492 | |
| Turnout | | | 35.4 |

Ward 12: Granitehill
| Party | Candidate | Votes | % |
|---|---|---|---|
| Labour | M.E. Farquhar | 870 | 55.7 |
| SNP | M.E. Watt | 665 | 42.5 |
| Liberal Democrats | S. Stephen | 28 | 1.8 |
| Majority | | 205 | |
| Turnout | | | 43.8 |

Ward 13: Hilton
| Party | Candidate | Votes | % |
|---|---|---|---|
| Labour | M.C. Morrell | 843 | 55.1 |
| Liberal Democrats | S. Wainman | 387 | 25.3 |
| SNP | N.J.L. Russell | 228 | 14.9 |
| Conservative | K.C. Longmore | 71 | 4.6 |
| Majority | | 456 | |
| Turnout | | | 44.0 |

Ward 14: Clifton
| Party | Candidate | Votes | % |
|---|---|---|---|
| Labour | C. Massie | 557 | 56.7 |
| SNP | I. McCann | 254 | 25.9 |
| Liberal Democrats | A. Anderson | 103 | 10.5 |
| Conservative | D.G. Morgan | 68 | 6.9 |
| Majority | | 303 | |
| Turnout | | | 30.0 |

Ward 15: Tillydrone
| Party | Candidate | Votes | % |
|---|---|---|---|
| Labour | J. Wyness | 675 | 71.4 |
| SNP | I.M. Hughes | 206 | 21.8 |
| Liberal Democrats | J.M. Robertson | 39 | 4.1 |
| Conservative | J. Wokoma | 26 | 2.7 |
| Majority | | 469 | |
| Turnout | | | 30.4 |

Ward 16: Old Aberdeen
| Party | Candidate | Votes | % |
|---|---|---|---|
| Labour | M. Irons | 518 | 67.7 |
| SNP | A.J. Allan | 153 | 20.0 |
| Liberal Democrats | A.G. Abraham | 60 | 7.8 |
| Conservative | P. Anderson | 34 | 4.4 |
| Majority | | 365 | |
| Turnout | | | 22.3 |

Ward 17: Seaton
| Party | Candidate | Votes | % |
|---|---|---|---|
| Labour | W. Traynor | 974 | 53.8 |
| SNP | A. Angus | 388 | 21.4 |
| Independent Labour | J. Main | 370 | 20.4 |
| Conservative | M.T. Morgan | 40 | 2.2 |
| Liberal Democrats | B.J.S. MacPherson | 39 | 2.2 |
| Majority | | 586 | |
| Turnout | | | 50.2 |

Ward 18: Pittodrie
| Party | Candidate | Votes | % |
|---|---|---|---|
| Labour | R.R. Webster | 819 | 73.8 |
| SNP | A.G. Mathieson | 183 | 16.5 |
| Liberal Democrats | J.A. Hodgson | 55 | 5.0 |
| Conservative | D.S. Lonsdale | 53 | 4.8 |
| Majority | | 636 | |
| Turnout | | | 30.6 |

Ward 19: Springhill
| Party | Candidate | Votes | % |
|---|---|---|---|
| Labour | G. Neill | 973 | 54.3 |
| SNP | P.B. Greenhom | 773 | 43.1 |
| Liberal Democrats | M. McLeod | 47 | 2.6 |
| Majority | | 200 | |
| Turnout | | | 48.9 |

Ward 20: Quarryhill
| Party | Candidate | Votes | % |
|---|---|---|---|
| Labour | R.G. Milne | 1,083 | 75.7 |
| SNP | R. Lovie | 289 | 20.2 |
| Liberal Democrats | S.M. Reid | 59 | 4.1 |
| Majority | | 794 | |
| Turnout | | | 40.0 |

Ward 21: Kittybrewster
| Party | Candidate | Votes | % |
|---|---|---|---|
| Labour | G. Third | 664 | 46.2 |
| Liberal Democrats | L.F.F. Hodgson | 546 | 38.0 |
| SNP | H.J. Gowers | 169 | 11.8 |
| Conservative | I.S. Hopkin | 57 | 4.0 |
| Majority | | 118 | |
| Turnout | | | 46.0 |

Ward 22: Stockethill
| Party | Candidate | Votes | % |
|---|---|---|---|
| Labour | J.R. Lamond | 1,156 | 73.8 |
| SNP | G.O. Kyd | 205 | 13.1 |
| Liberal Democrats | N.D. Fletcher | 142 | 9.1 |
| Conservative | J.B. Parsons | 63 | 4.0 |
| Majority | | 951 | |
| Turnout | | | 43.2 |

Ward 23: Sheddocksley
| Party | Candidate | Votes | % |
|---|---|---|---|
| Labour | J.A. Lamond | 1,006 | 68.0 |
| SNP | K. Stewart | 363 | 24.5 |
| Liberal Democrats | A. Bryson | 67 | 4.5 |
| Conservative | J. McGee | 44 | 3.0 |
| Majority | | 643 | |
| Turnout | | | 38.6 |

Ward 24: Muirfield
| Party | Candidate | Votes | % |
|---|---|---|---|
| Labour | L. Ironside | 986 | 72.4 |
| SNP | K.A. Shirron | 252 | 18.5 |
| Liberal Democrats | W.B. Anderson | 66 | 4.8 |
| Conservative | C. Miller | 57 | 4.2 |
| Majority | | 734 | |
| Turnout | | | 37.6 |

Ward 25: Midstocket
| Party | Candidate | Votes | % |
|---|---|---|---|
| Conservative | J.A. Porter | 792 | 50.0 |
| Labour | L.M. Taylor | 404 | 25.5 |
| Liberal Democrats | A.W. Stokes | 206 | 13.0 |
| SNP | R. Clunas | 181 | 11.4 |
| Majority | | 388 | |
| Turnout | | | 49.9 |

Ward 26: Argyll
| Party | Candidate | Votes | % |
|---|---|---|---|
| Labour | M.E. Stewart | 509 | 46.7 |
| Conservative | P.R.P. Cunningham | 249 | 22.8 |
| SNP | F. Nimmo | 207 | 19.0 |
| Liberal Democrats | M. Robb | 126 | 11.5 |
| Majority | | 260 | |
| Turnout | | | 29.4 |

Ward 27: Sunnybank
| Party | Candidate | Votes | % |
|---|---|---|---|
| Labour | M.E. Smith | 615 | 61.5 |
| SNP | G.C. Graham | 262 | 26.2 |
| Liberal Democrats | P. Tait | 76 | 7.6 |
| Conservative | I. Simpson | 47 | 4.7 |
| Majority | | 353 | |
| Turnout | | | 31.8 |

Ward 28: Mounthooly
| Party | Candidate | Votes | % |
|---|---|---|---|
| Labour | E.M. Harris | 739 | 68.8 |
| SNP | J.A. Paprotny | 244 | 22.7 |
| Liberal Democrats | S.H. Stark | 55 | 5.1 |
| Conservative | D.J. Rettie | 36 | 3.4 |
| Majority | | 495 | |
| Turnout | | | 28.0 |

Ward 29: Fernielea
| Party | Candidate | Votes | % |
|---|---|---|---|
| Conservative | S. Gordon | 599 | 40.1 |
| Labour | A.E. Dow | 367 | 24.6 |
| Liberal Democrats | F.J. Davies | 349 | 23.4 |
| SNP | K.L. Muir | 178 | 11.9 |
| Majority | | 232 | |
| Turnout | | | 44.7 |

Ward 30: Seafield
| Party | Candidate | Votes | % |
|---|---|---|---|
| Conservative | M.C. Hastie | 714 | 45.8 |
| Liberal Democrats | A.S. Lings | 406 | 26.0 |
| Labour | S.M. Inkster | 256 | 16.4 |
| SNP | G. Gemmell | 183 | 11.7 |
| Majority | | 308 | |
| Turnout | | | 45.7 |

Ward 31: Queens Cross
| Party | Candidate | Votes | % |
|---|---|---|---|
| Conservative | R.D.I. Anderson | 579 | 52.2 |
| Labour | I.M. Bell | 292 | 26.3 |
| Liberal Democrats | J.D. Alexander | 238 | 21.5 |
| Majority | | 287 | |
| Turnout | | | 33.6 |

Ward 32: Harlaw
| Party | Candidate | Votes | % |
|---|---|---|---|
| Conservative | J.A. Dempsey | 399 | 43.8 |
| Labour | L.E.A. Park | 238 | 26.2 |
| SNP | W. Murdoch-Petrie | 142 | 15.6 |
| Liberal Democrats | E.A. MacDonald | 131 | 14.4 |
| Majority | | 161 | |
| Turnout | | | 28.3 |

Ward 33: Langstane
| Party | Candidate | Votes | % |
|---|---|---|---|
| Labour | C.H. Clevitt | 746 | 62.3 |
| SNP | G.G. Swanson | 223 | 18.6 |
| Conservative | A.S. Thomson | 125 | 10.4 |
| Liberal Democrats | G. MacDonald | 103 | 8.6 |
| Majority | | 523 | |
| Turnout | | | 23.9 |

Ward 34: Castlehill
| Party | Candidate | Votes | % |
|---|---|---|---|
| Labour | R. Middleton | 497 | 69.9 |
| SNP | R. Colvin | 144 | 20.3 |
| Liberal Democrats | W.Y. Stark | 37 | 5.2 |
| Conservative | D.R. Porter | 33 | 4.6 |
| Majority | | 353 | |
| Turnout | | | 25.1 |

Ward 35: Culter
| Party | Candidate | Votes | % |
|---|---|---|---|
| Liberal Democrats | P. MacDonald | 1,064 | 71.5 |
| Conservative | E.J. Leavitt | 152 | 10.2 |
| SNP | F.C. Ahrens | 142 | 9.5 |
| Labour | B.L. Salter | 131 | 8.8 |
| Majority | | 912 | |
| Turnout | | | 40.9 |

Ward 36: Murtle
| Party | Candidate | Votes | % |
|---|---|---|---|
| Liberal Democrats | J.M. Stephenson | 831 | 56.0 |
| Conservative | G.C. Adams | 486 | 32.7 |
| SNP | G.T. Smith | 105 | 7.1 |
| Labour | R. Domeracki | 63 | 4.2 |
| Majority | | 345 | |
| Turnout | | | 43.5 |

Ward 37: Cults
| Party | Candidate | Votes | % |
|---|---|---|---|
| Conservative | N.L.M. Milne | 998 | 50.3 |
| Liberal Democrats | A.J. Malone | 824 | 41.5 |
| Labour | M.P. Ellis | 89 | 4.5 |
| SNP | M. Addison | 75 | 3.8 |
| Majority | | 174 | |
| Turnout | | | 50.7 |

Ward 38: Mannofield
| Party | Candidate | Votes | % |
|---|---|---|---|
| Conservative | J.G.A Wisely | 954 | 53.6 |
| Liberal Democrats | E.S. Massie | 591 | 33.2 |
| SNP | I. Lennox | 125 | 7.0 |
| Labour | J. O'Donnell | 111 | 6.2 |
| Majority | | 363 | |
| Turnout | | | 60.5 |

Ward 39: Garthdee
| Party | Candidate | Votes | % |
|---|---|---|---|
| Labour | D.J. Nicol | 760 | 47.4 |
| Liberal Democrats | S. Ness | 503 | 31.4 |
| SNP | S.H.M. Joss | 242 | 15.1 |
| Conservative | J.W.M. Duncan | 98 | 6.1 |
| Majority | | 257 | |
| Turnout | | | 46.5 |

Ward 40: Morningside
| Party | Candidate | Votes | % |
|---|---|---|---|
| Liberal Democrats | I.G. Yuill | 761 | 57.9 |
| Labour | A. Flockhart | 239 | 18.2 |
| Conservative | I.G. Lofthus | 199 | 15.1 |
| SNP | J. Gray | 115 | 8.8 |
| Majority | | 522 | |
| Turnout | | | 45.7 |

Ward 41: Ashley
| Party | Candidate | Votes | % |
|---|---|---|---|
| Conservative | M.A. Graham | 515 | 40.8 |
| Labour | E.M. Thomson | 307 | 24.3 |
| Liberal Democrats | J.D. Stewart | 235 | 18.6 |
| SNP | K.S.A. Johnston | 204 | 16.2 |
| Majority | | 208 | |
| Turnout | | | 35.3 |

Ward 42: Broomhill
| Party | Candidate | Votes | % |
|---|---|---|---|
| Conservative | J.W. Graham | 435 | 33.6 |
| Liberal Democrats | I.S. Cormack | 383 | 29.6 |
| Labour | V.B. Nair | 291 | 22.5 |
| SNP | S.E. Stephen | 186 | 14.4 |
| Majority | | 52 | |
| Turnout | | | 39.7 |

Ward 43: Gairn
| Party | Candidate | Votes | % |
|---|---|---|---|
| Labour | S. Henderson | 536 | 40.9 |
| Liberal Democrats | D.R. Falconer | 391 | 29.8 |
| Conservative | D.W. Ritchie | 219 | 16.7 |
| SNP | D.A. Geddie | 164 | 12.5 |
| Majority | | 145 | |
| Turnout | | | 39.4 |

Ward 44: Duthie
| Party | Candidate | Votes | % |
|---|---|---|---|
| Labour | G.A. Whyte | 412 | 32.3 |
| Conservative | J.A. Donnelly | 370 | 29.0 |
| Liberal Democrats | W.M. Robb | 311 | 24.4 |
| SNP | M.D. Mair | 181 | 14.2 |
| Majority | | 42 | |
| Turnout | | | 37.4 |

Ward 45: Glenbervie
| Party | Candidate | Votes | % |
|---|---|---|---|
| Labour | J.K.A. Thomaneck | 780 | 64.4 |
| SNP | D. Shillinglaw | 334 | 27.6 |
| Conservative | D.M. Morrison | 56 | 4.6 |
| Liberal Democrats | L. Dyson | 41 | 3.4 |
| Majority | | 446 | |
| Turnout | | | 34.3 |

Ward 46: Victoria
| Party | Candidate | Votes | % |
|---|---|---|---|
| Labour | Y. Allan | 741 | 70.8 |
| SNP | R.M. Robertson | 221 | 21.1 |
| Conservative | M.F. Wheeler | 42 | 4.0 |
| Liberal Democrats | B.W. Tulloch | 42 | 4.0 |
| Majority | | 520 | |
| Turnout | | | 33.3 |

Ward 47: Lower Kincorth
| Party | Candidate | Votes | % |
|---|---|---|---|
| Labour | D.E. Clyne | 798 | 56.5 |
| Liberal Democrats | D.M. Lyon | 331 | 23.4 |
| SNP | P. Yule | 229 | 16.2 |
| Conservative | P.J. Wilcock | 54 | 3.8 |
| Majority | | 467 | |
| Turnout | | | 42.1 |

Ward 48: Upper Kincorth
| Party | Candidate | Votes | % |
|---|---|---|---|
| Labour | G. Urquhart | 1,071 | 70.7 |
| SNP | S.C. Hutcheon | 297 | 19.6 |
| Liberal Democrats | R. Ingram | 146 | 9.6 |
| Majority | | 774 | |
| Turnout | | | 45.5 |

Ward 49: Tullos Hill
| Party | Candidate | Votes | % |
|---|---|---|---|
| Labour | A.P. MacLean | 690 | 49.3 |
| SNP | R. Kemp | 520 | 37.2 |
| Liberal Democrats | J.D. Brown | 143 | 10.2 |
| Conservative | A.G. Morrison | 46 | 3.3 |
| Majority | | 170 | |
| Turnout | | | 40.3 |

Ward 50: Loirston
| Party | Candidate | Votes | % |
|---|---|---|---|
| Liberal Democrats | K.M. Dean | 580 | 47.2 |
| Labour | A. Massie | 435 | 35.4 |
| SNP | A. McCabe | 171 | 13.9 |
| Conservative | M.C.A. Melville | 44 | 3.6 |
| Majority | | 145 | |
| Turnout | | | 41.2 |
