= 1977 City of Aberdeen District Council election =

1977 Scottish local government election

← 1974	3 May 1977	1980 →

All 48 seats to City of Aberdeen Council 25 seats needed for a majority

	First party	Second party	Third party
Party	Labour	Conservative	Liberal
Last election	29 seats, 45.0%	17 seats, 34.8%	2 seats, 14.6%
Seats won	22	16	7
Seat change	▼7	▼1	▲5
Popular vote	37.5%	36.0%	15.8%
Percentage	19,352	18,552	8,158
Swing	▼7.5%	▲1.2%	▲1.2%
	Fourth party	Fifth party
Party	SNP	Independent
Last election	0 seats, 2.0%	0 seats, 3.0%
Seats won	2	1
Seat change	▲2	▲1
Popular vote	5.3%	3.5%
Percentage	2,758	1,817
Swing	▲3.3%	▲0.5%
- The 48 single-member wards
Council Leader before election
Labour
Council Leader after election
No overall control

The 1977 City of Aberdeen District Council election took place on 3 May 1977 to elect members of City of Aberdeen Council, as part of that years Scottish local elections.

== Election results ==
City of Aberdeen local election result 1977
Party	Seats	Gains	Losses	Net gain/loss	Seats %	Votes %	Votes	+/−
Labour	22			▼7		37.5	19,352	▼7.5
Conservative	16			▼1		36.0	18,552	▲1.2
Liberal	7			▲5		15.8	8,158	▲1.2
SNP	2			▲2		5.3	2,758	▲3.3
Independent	1			▲1		3.5	1,817	▲0.5
SLP	0			0	0.0	1.2	616	New
Communist	0			0	0.0	0.3	166	▼0.2
Scottish Socialist	0			0	0.0	0.3	140	New
