= 1999 Aberdeen City Council election =

1999 Scottish local government election

| ← 1995 | 6 May 1999 | 2003 → |

All 43 seats to Aberdeen City Council 22 seats needed for a majority

| | First party | Second party |
|---|---|---|
| Party | Labour | Liberal Democrats |
| Last election | 30 seats, 42.0% | 10 seats, 23.9% |
| Seats won | 22 | 12 |
| Seat change | ▼8 | ▲2 |
| Popular vote | 28,394 | 22,673 |
| Percentage | 31.9% | 25.5% |
| Swing | ▼10.1% | ▲1.6% |
| | Third party | Fourth party |
| Party | Conservative | SNP |
| Last election | 9 seats, 14.4% | 1 seat, 18.1% |
| Seats won | 6 | 3 |
| Seat change | ▼3 | ▲2 |
| Popular vote | 15,372 | 22,337 |
| Percentage | 17.3% | 25.1% |
| Swing | ▲2.9% | ▲7.0% |
- The 43 single-member wards
Council Leader before election
Labour
Council Leader after election
Labour

The 1999 Aberdeen City Council election took place on 6 May 1999 to elect members of Aberdeen City Council. This election was held on the same day as other Scottish local government elections and the first Scottish Parliament Election.

The results saw Labour retain its control of the council, albeit with a reduced majority.

== Election results ==
Aberdeen City local election result 1999
| Party | Seats | Gains | Losses | Net gain/loss | Seats % | Votes % | Votes | +/− |
|---|---|---|---|---|---|---|---|---|
| Labour | 22 | | | ▼8 | 51.2 | 31.9 | 28,394 | ▼10.1 |
| Liberal Democrats | 12 | | | ▲2 | 27.9 | 25.5 | 22,673 | ▲1.6 |
| Conservative | 6 | | | ▼3 | 14.0 | 17.3 | 15,372 | ▲2.9 |
| SNP | 3 | | | ▲2 | 7.0 | 25.1 | 22,337 | ▲7.0 |
| Independent | 0 | | | 0 | 0.0 | 0.2 | 156 | ▼0.6 |

== Ward results ==
Ward 1: Dyce
| Party | Candidate | Votes | % |
|---|---|---|---|
| Liberal Democrats | R. Clark | 1,035 | 48.5 |
| Labour | P. D'Arcy | 474 | 22.2 |
| SNP | M.A. McKessick | 466 | 21.8 |
| Conservative | A.E.R. MacKenzie | 159 | 7.5 |
| Majority | | 561 | |
| Turnout | | | 52.5 |

Ward 2: Bankhead/Stoneywood
| Party | Candidate | Votes | % |
|---|---|---|---|
| Liberal Democrats | J. Anderson | 811 | 34.7 |
| Labour | B. Rattray | 754 | 32.2 |
| SNP | A.C. Bruce | 517 | 22.1 |
| Conservative | D.L. Stephens | 258 | 11.0 |
| Majority | | 57 | |
| Turnout | | | 54.9 |

Ward 3: Danestone
| Party | Candidate | Votes | % |
|---|---|---|---|
| Liberal Democrats | R. Hutcheon | 802 | 38.0 |
| Labour | H.W. Leys | 534 | 25.3 |
| SNP | D.S. Falconer | 518 | 24.5 |
| Conservative | I. Cromarty | 259 | 12.3 |
| Majority | | 268 | |
| Turnout | | | 50.7 |

Ward 4: Jesmond
| Party | Candidate | Votes | % |
|---|---|---|---|
| Liberal Democrats | G.A. Leslie | 712 | 31.2 |
| Labour | B.J. Taylor | 681 | 29.8 |
| SNP | P. Scott-Wilson | 674 | 29.5 |
| Conservative | S.C. Robertson | 218 | 9.5 |
| Majority | | 31 | |
| Turnout | | | 53.0 |

Ward 5: Oldmachar
| Party | Candidate | Votes | % |
|---|---|---|---|
| Liberal Democrats | J.M. Reynolds | 879 | 44.9 |
| Labour | A. Benzie | 440 | 22.5 |
| SNP | A. Stuart | 416 | 21.3 |
| Conservative | B.G. Davidson | 221 | 11.3 |
| Majority | | 439 | |
| Turnout | | | 50.6 |

Ward 6: Bridge of Don
| Party | Candidate | Votes | % |
|---|---|---|---|
| Liberal Democrats | I.S. Cormack | 727 | 31.9 |
| Labour | S.M. Rae | 703 | 30.9 |
| SNP | A. Angus | 604 | 26.5 |
| Conservative | R. Crombie | 243 | 10.7 |
| Majority | | 24 | |
| Turnout | | | 55.8 |

Ward 7: Donmouth
| Party | Candidate | Votes | % |
|---|---|---|---|
| SNP | M. Jaffrey | 474 | 29.2 |
| Liberal Democrats | C. McDonald | 463 | 28.5 |
| Labour | M.Tuckwell | 396 | 24.4 |
| Conservative | D.W. Ritchie | 291 | 17.9 |
| Majority | | 11 | |
| Turnout | | | 44.0 |

Ward 8: Newhills
| Party | Candidate | Votes | % |
|---|---|---|---|
| Labour | D. Maitland | 570 | 27.1 |
| Liberal Democrats | A. Anderson | 542 | 25.7 |
| Conservative | D.W. Martin | 518 | 24.6 |
| SNP | C. Bruce | 475 | 22.6 |
| Majority | | 28 | |
| Turnout | | | 53.1 |

Ward 9: Auchmill
| Party | Candidate | Votes | % |
|---|---|---|---|
| SNP | K. Stewart | 871 | 47.5 |
| Labour | C. Wood | 645 | 35.1 |
| Liberal Democrats | G. Wyatt | 187 | 10.2 |
| Conservative | M.E. MacGinn | 132 | 7.2 |
| Majority | | 226 | |
| Turnout | | | 44.6 |

Ward 10: Cummings Park
| Party | Candidate | Votes | % |
|---|---|---|---|
| Labour | G. Graham | 934 | 48.1 |
| SNP | F.C. Muir | 839 | 43.2 |
| Liberal Democrats | D. Pearce | 110 | 5.7 |
| Conservative | C. Maggetti | 59 | 3.0 |
| Majority | | 95 | |
| Turnout | | | 47.7 |

Ward 11: Springhill
| Party | Candidate | Votes | % |
|---|---|---|---|
| SNP | K.A. Shirron | 805 | 45.4 |
| Labour | G. Neill | 798 | 45.0 |
| Liberal Democrats | S. Watt | 98 | 5.5 |
| Conservative | K.W. Pirie | 71 | 7.5 |
| Majority | | 7 | |
| Turnout | | | 47.9 |

Ward 12: Mastrick
| Party | Candidate | Votes | % |
|---|---|---|---|
| Labour | R. Milne | 1,118 | 54.2 |
| SNP | J.E.E. Dunbar | 862 | 41.8 |
| Conservative | J. Wokoma | 83 | 4.0 |
| Majority | | 256 | |
| Turnout | | | 51.0 |

Ward 13: Sheddocksley
| Party | Candidate | Votes | % |
|---|---|---|---|
| Labour | J.A. Lamond | 1,030 | 52.3 |
| SNP | P.E. Calder | 670 | 34.0 |
| Liberal Democrats | K.R. Johnson | 177 | 9.0 |
| Conservative | C.J. Thomson | 94 | 4.8 |
| Majority | | 360 | |
| Turnout | | | 49.3 |

Ward 14: Summerhill
| Party | Candidate | Votes | % |
|---|---|---|---|
| Labour | L. Ironside | 831 | 45.1 |
| SNP | R. Kemp | 545 | 29.6 |
| Liberal Democrats | E.A. MacDonald | 238 | 12.9 |
| Conservative | S. Murray | 229 | 12.4 |
| Majority | | 286 | |
| Turnout | | | 51.2 |

Ward 15: Hilton
| Party | Candidate | Votes | % |
|---|---|---|---|
| Labour | G. Adam | 825 | 41.6 |
| SNP | K.T. Muir | 716 | 36.1 |
| Liberal Democrats | S. Wainman | 280 | 14.1 |
| Conservative | A. Morrison | 164 | 8.3 |
| Majority | | 109 | |
| Turnout | | | 50.5 |

Ward 16: Woodside/Tillydrone
| Party | Candidate | Votes | % |
|---|---|---|---|
| Labour | J. Wyness | 759 | 43.8 |
| SNP | H. Gowers | 627 | 36.2 |
| Liberal Democrats | B. Roy | 220 | 12.7 |
| Conservative | I. Simpson | 127 | 7.3 |
| Majority | | 132 | |
| Turnout | | | 45.9 |

Ward 17: St. Machar
| Party | Candidate | Votes | % |
|---|---|---|---|
| Labour | M. Irons | 608 | 34.6 |
| SNP | W.G. Gault | 594 | 33.8 |
| Liberal Democrats | T.D. Kelly | 400 | 22.8 |
| Conservative | H.R.L. Nelless | 154 | 8.8 |
| Majority | | 14 | |
| Turnout | | | 46.0 |

Ward 18: Seaton
| Party | Candidate | Votes | % |
|---|---|---|---|
| Labour | W. Traynor | 885 | 50.0 |
| SNP | J. Noble | 636 | 36.0 |
| Liberal Democrats | G. Ford | 163 | 9.2 |
| Conservative | J.M. Ritchie | 85 | 4.8 |
| Majority | | 249 | |
| Turnout | | | 49.0 |

Ward 19: Kittybrewster
| Party | Candidate | Votes | % |
|---|---|---|---|
| Labour | C.K. Pirie | 724 | 34.9 |
| Liberal Democrats | N.D. Fletcher | 711 | 34.3 |
| SNP | S.C. Hutcheon | 470 | 22.7 |
| Conservative | S.N.G. Whyte | 168 | 8.1 |
| Majority | | 13 | |
| Turnout | | | 55.3 |

Ward 20: Stockethill
| Party | Candidate | Votes | % |
|---|---|---|---|
| Labour | J.R. Lamond | 1,135 | 53.4 |
| SNP | M. MacLeod | 562 | 26.4 |
| Liberal Democrats | L.F.F. Hodgson | 225 | 10.6 |
| Conservative | K.H. Brookes | 205 | 9.6 |
| Majority | | 573 | |
| Turnout | | | 55.5 |

Ward 21: Berryden
| Party | Candidate | Votes | % |
|---|---|---|---|
| Labour | E.M. Harris | 610 | 35.7 |
| SNP | J.D. McClure | 533 | 31.2 |
| Liberal Democrats | J.A. Hodgson | 382 | 22.4 |
| Conservative | A. MacKay | 184 | 10.8 |
| Majority | | 77 | |
| Turnout | | | 45.9 |

Ward 22: Sunnybank
| Party | Candidate | Votes | % |
|---|---|---|---|
| Labour | M.T. Smith | 835 | 44.6 |
| SNP | G.C. Graham | 489 | 26.1 |
| Liberal Democrats | C.E. Kelly | 341 | 18.2 |
| Conservative | A.S. Harper | 207 | 11.1 |
| Majority | | 346 | |
| Turnout | | | 50.1 |

Ward 23: Pittodrie
| Party | Candidate | Votes | % |
|---|---|---|---|
| Labour | R.R. Webster | 686 | 42.4 |
| SNP | I.M. Hughes | 492 | 30.4 |
| Liberal Democrats | F.J. Davies | 311 | 19.2 |
| Conservative | R.A. Gordon | 129 | 8.0 |
| Majority | | 194 | |
| Turnout | | | 45.0 |

Ward 24: Midstocket
| Party | Candidate | Votes | % |
|---|---|---|---|
| Conservative | J.A. Porter | 1,373 | 51.8 |
| Labour | E.J. Fowler | 523 | 19.7 |
| Liberal Democrats | J.R. Cameron | 380 | 14.3 |
| SNP | R.L. McGregor | 374 | 14.1 |
| Majority | | 850 | |
| Turnout | | | 62.3 |

Ward 25: Queens Cross
| Party | Candidate | Votes | % |
|---|---|---|---|
| Conservative | J.A. Dempsey | 993 | 44.5 |
| Liberal Democrats | J.D. Stewart | 685 | 30.7 |
| Labour | J.M. King | 301 | 13.5 |
| SNP | J.A. Milton | 250 | 11.2 |
| Majority | | 308 | |
| Turnout | | | 58.6 |

Ward 26: Gilcomston
| Party | Candidate | Votes | % |
|---|---|---|---|
| Labour | M. Stewart | 608 | 35.6 |
| SNP | F. Nimmo | 385 | 22.5 |
| Liberal Democrats | P. Tait | 373 | 21.8 |
| Conservative | J. Gordon | 343 | 20.1 |
| Majority | | 223 | |
| Turnout | | | 49.4 |

Ward 27: Langstane
| Party | Candidate | Votes | % |
|---|---|---|---|
| Labour | B.C. Rutherford | 544 | 33.6 |
| SNP | L. McL Barr | 470 | 29.0 |
| Liberal Democrats | S.T. Gow | 284 | 17.5 |
| Conservative | A. Carruthers | 167 | 10.3 |
| Independent | M. Greig | 156 | 9.6 |
| Majority | | 74 | |
| Turnout | | | 40.1 |

Ward 28: Castlehill
| Party | Candidate | Votes | % |
|---|---|---|---|
| Labour | J.K. Thomaneck | 706 | 43.5 |
| SNP | I. McCann | 537 | 33.1 |
| Liberal Democrats | D.D. Gray | 249 | 15.3 |
| Conservative | F.G. Taylor | 131 | 8.1 |
| Majority | | 169 | |
| Turnout | | | 42.4 |

Ward 29: Hazlehead
| Party | Candidate | Votes | % |
|---|---|---|---|
| Conservative | S. Gordon | 974 | 37.9 |
| Liberal Democrats | T.J. Couzens | 652 | 25.4 |
| Labour | A. Flockhart | 596 | 23.2 |
| SNP | T.J. Greig | 349 | 13.6 |
| Majority | | 322 | |
| Turnout | | | 67.5 |

Ward 30: Peterculter
| Party | Candidate | Votes | % |
|---|---|---|---|
| Liberal Democrats | P. MacDonald | 1,230 | 52.0 |
| Labour | D.J. Wood | 385 | 16.3 |
| SNP | G.T. Smith | 381 | 16.1 |
| Conservative | R.E. McBay | 368 | 15.6 |
| Majority | | 845 | |
| Turnout | | | 58.2 |

Ward 31: Murtle
| Party | Candidate | Votes | % |
|---|---|---|---|
| Liberal Democrats | J.M. Stephenson | 1,213 | 46.8 |
| Conservative | M.M. Stewart | 911 | 35.2 |
| Labour | W. Coull | 286 | 11.0 |
| SNP | G. Raitt | 180 | 6.9 |
| Majority | | 302 | |
| Turnout | | | 60.6 |

Ward 32: Cults
| Party | Candidate | Votes | % |
|---|---|---|---|
| Conservative | A.D. Milne | 1,115 | 40.9 |
| Liberal Democrats | A.J. Malone | 1,108 | 40.7 |
| Labour | J. McGee | 291 | 10.7 |
| SNP | M.E. Forrest | 211 | 7.7 |
| Majority | | 7 | |
| Turnout | | | 67.1 |

Ward 33: Mannofield
| Party | Candidate | Votes | % |
|---|---|---|---|
| Conservative | J.G.A. Wisely | 1,701 | 59.2 |
| Liberal Democrats | G. Johnston | 479 | 16.7 |
| Labour | S.M. MacDonald | 409 | 14.2 |
| SNP | I.D. Thomson | 286 | 9.9 |
| Majority | | 1222 | |
| Turnout | | | 65.4 |

Ward 34: Ashley
| Party | Candidate | Votes | % |
|---|---|---|---|
| Conservative | M.A. Graham | 653 | 33.9 |
| Liberal Democrats | M. Greig | 532 | 27.7 |
| Labour | I.S. Shand | 412 | 21.4 |
| SNP | J. McK Ogg | 327 | 17.0 |
| Majority | | 121 | |
| Turnout | | | 51.7 |

Ward 35: Broomhill
| Party | Candidate | Votes | % |
|---|---|---|---|
| Liberal Democrats | I.G. Yuill | 1,306 | 47.8 |
| Conservative | J.W. Graham | 711 | 26.0 |
| Labour | W. McGee | 407 | 14.9 |
| SNP | M.L. Grant | 311 | 11.4 |
| Majority | | 595 | |
| Turnout | | | 66.5 |

Ward 36: Garthdee
| Party | Candidate | Votes | % |
|---|---|---|---|
| Liberal Democrats | G.S. Cassie | 1,049 | 47.8 |
| Labour | C. Kelly | 611 | 27.8 |
| SNP | S.H.M. Forbes | 431 | 19.6 |
| Conservative | G.W. Carr | 103 | 4.7 |
| Majority | | 438 | |
| Turnout | | | 56.4 |

Ward 37: Holburn
| Party | Candidate | Votes | % |
|---|---|---|---|
| Liberal Democrats | D.R. Falconer | 706 | 33.0 |
| Labour | S.S. Henderson | 671 | 31.3 |
| SNP | J. Allan | 395 | 18.4 |
| Conservative | M. Aitchison | 370 | 17.3 |
| Majority | | 35 | |
| Turnout | | | 55.4 |

Ward 38: Duthie
| Party | Candidate | Votes | % |
|---|---|---|---|
| Labour | W.A. McIntosh | 563 | 28.6 |
| Conservative | J. Donnelly | 534 | 27.2 |
| Liberal Democrats | A. Butler | 521 | 26.5 |
| SNP | M. Mair | 348 | 17.7 |
| Majority | | 29 | |
| Turnout | | | 51.8 |

Ward 39: Torry
| Party | Candidate | Votes | % |
|---|---|---|---|
| Labour | Y. Allan | 778 | 44.0 |
| SNP | R. McE Robertson | 632 | 35.7 |
| Liberal Democrats | M.R. Duncan | 235 | 13.3 |
| Conservative | L.P. Darrant | 124 | 7.0 |
| Majority | | 146 | |
| Turnout | | | 43.3 |

Ward 40: Tullos
| Party | Candidate | Votes | % |
|---|---|---|---|
| Labour | A. MacLean | 717 | 44.9 |
| SNP | B. Robertson | 648 | 40.6 |
| Liberal Democrats | B.J. Dean | 155 | 9.7 |
| Conservative | A.S. Thomson | 77 | 4.8 |
| Majority | | 69 | |
| Turnout | | | 39.5 |

Ward 41: Kincorth West
| Party | Candidate | Votes | % |
|---|---|---|---|
| Labour | D.E. Clyne | 1,111 | 47.9 |
| SNP | G. Swanson | 656 | 28.3 |
| Liberal Democrats | M. Cassie | 404 | 17.4 |
| Conservative | P.J.E.J. Atkinson | 148 | 6.4 |
| Majority | | 455 | |
| Turnout | | | 56.0 |

Ward 42: Kincorth East
| Party | Candidate | Votes | % |
|---|---|---|---|
| Labour | G. Urquhart | 984 | 44.4 |
| SNP | P. Yule | 789 | 35.6 |
| Liberal Democrats | A.M. Bisset | 319 | 14.4 |
| Conservative | D. Torrance | 122 | 5.5 |
| Majority | | 195 | |
| Turnout | | | 56.6 |

Ward 43: Loirston
| Party | Candidate | Votes | % |
|---|---|---|---|
| Liberal Democrats | K.M. Dean | 979 | 44.2 |
| SNP | E.D. McCabe | 522 | 23.6 |
| Labour | M. Noble | 516 | 23.3 |
| Conservative | L. Dewar | 196 | 8.9 |
| Majority | | 457 | |
| Turnout | | | 51.6 |
