= 1973 Glasgow Corporation election =

Local election in Scotland

An Election to Glasgow Corporation was held on 1 May 1973, alongside municipal elections across Scotland. Of the councils 113 seats, 37 were up for election. Labour managed to increase its majority on the council to 55.

Following the election, Glasgow Corporation was composed of 83 Labour councillors, 25 Conservatives, 3 Progressives, and 2 ex officio members.

Turnout was 183,308, out of a total electorate of 601,506 (30.47% turnout).

== Aggregate results ==
Glasgow Corporation election, 1973
Party	Seats	Gains	Losses	Net gain/loss	Seats %	Votes %	Votes	+/−
Labour	26	4	0	▲4	70.27	52.92	97,011	
Conservative	11	2	1	▲1	29.73	31.74	58,178	
SNP	0	0	0	Steady	0.0	9.77	17,902	
Communist	0	0	0	Steady	0.0	2.79	5,114	
Liberal	0	0	0	Steady	0.0	1.77	3,248	
Progressives	0	0	5	▼5	0.0	0.54	989	
Labour Party of Scotland	0	0	0	Steady	0.0	0.28	507	
Association of Scottish National Trade Unionists	0	0	0	Steady	0.0	0.20	359	
