= 1984 City of Aberdeen District Council election =

1984 Scottish local government election

← 1980	3 May 1984	1988 →

All 50 seats to City of Aberdeen Council 26 seats needed for a majority

	First party	Second party	Third party
Party	Labour	Alliance	Conservative
Last election	27 seats, 44.3%	8 seats, 18.7%	13 seats, 32.4%
Seats won	28	14	8
Seat change	▲1	▲6	▼5
Popular vote	24,211	20,018	12,992
Percentage	40.7%	33.6%	21.8%
Swing	▼3.6%	▲14.9%	▼10.6%
- The 50 single-member wards
Council Leader before election
Labour
Council Leader after election
Labour

The 1984 City of Aberdeen District Council election took place on 3 May 1984 to elect members of City of Aberdeen Council, as part of Scottish local elections for that year.

== Election results ==
City of Aberdeen local election result 1984
Party	Seats	Gains	Losses	Net gain/loss	Seats %	Votes %	Votes	+/−
Labour	28			▲1		40.7	24,211	▼3.6
Alliance	14			▲6		33.6	20,018	▲14.9
Conservative	8			▼5		21.8	12,992	▼10.6
SNP	0			0	0.0	3.7	2,218	▼0.4
Green	0			0	0.0	0.2	104	New
