= Labour Party of Scotland =

Minor Scottish political party in the 1970s

- Founded: Early 1970s
- Dissolved: 24 May 1973
- Headquarters: Dundee, Scotland
- Ideology: Labourism; Scottish nationalism
- Political position: Left-wing

The Labour Party of Scotland was a minor Scottish nationalist political party that was active in the early 1970s. Formed as a left-wing breakaway from Dundee's branch of the Scottish National Party (SNP), it is perhaps best known for standing in the Dundee East by-election of 1973, where its interference split the nationalist vote and probably cost the SNP a parliamentary seat as a result. The party contested elections to Dundee City Council two months later but was ultimately unsuccessful. It folded soon after, and by early 1974 most of its membership had returned to the SNP, whose campaigns on North Sea oil were proving popular with Scotland's urban electorate. It never had any official political representation.

William Wolfe, then leader of the SNP, dismissed the Labour Party of Scotland's founding as opportunism on the part of local politicians. These included George MacLean, the party's most popular member, whose by-election rival Gordon Wilson succeeded Wolfe in 1979.

== History ==
=== Formation ===
The party was founded by disgruntled Scottish National Party (SNP) activists from Dundee as a breakaway group sometime in the early 1970s. William Wolfe, then leader of the SNP, contended that the split had not occurred as a result of any ideological difference, instead arguing that the leaders of the new group departed to advance their own local political careers. That said, the small party has been described by historian Peter Lynch as more radical than the SNP; it was broadly left-wing and strongly supportive of Scotland's labour movement, as its name would suggest. It modeled itself on a separate Glaswegian group that was founded in 1971 and also called itself the "Labour Party of Scotland", although this faction soon refused any affiliation with the Dundee group. In spite of this, the Dundee party proceeded to develop its organisation and rented office rooms.

=== By-election campaign ===
Unlike its Glaswegian counterpart, which exclusively contested elections to the Glasgow Corporation, Dundee's now larger party fought for a seat in the United Kingdom Parliament. The appointment of George Thomson as a European Commissioner in January 1973 saw him vacate his constituency of Dundee East, triggering a by-election two months later. The Labour Party of Scotland selected George MacLean to be its candidate, pitting him against Labour's George Machin, the SNP's Gordon Wilson and Conservative candidate William Fitzgerald, then Lord Provost of Dundee. Nathaniel Gordon of the Liberal Party, equally optimistic, attracted Jeremy Thorpe to the city during his campaign. In a closely fought contest, George Machin took the seat with a majority of 1,141, despite Labour's vote share declining by 15.6%. This was largely down to the strong performance of the SNP, who increased its own by 21.2%. The latter's campaign capitalised on keeping North Sea oil in Scotland to benefit people living in urban areas. A similar platform was used in the Glasgow Govan by-election later that year, electing Margo MacDonald to the House of Commons.

Political scientist David Boothroyd believes that the intervention of the Labour Party of Scotland in the Dundee by-election prevented a similar accomplishment by splitting the nationalist vote. Indeed, the 1,409 votes for MacLean outnumbered Machin's majority over his SNP rival Gordon Wilson; Boothroyd further opines "it is questionable whether voters were clear about [the party's] origin." Nevertheless, the SNP's popularity in both 1973 by-elections served as a prelude to the "It's Scotland's oil" political campaign, which has since become synonymous with the party's economic case for Scottish independence.

=== Council election and dissolution ===
On 2 May 1973 elections to Dundee City Council commenced, with the Labour Party of Scotland fielding a total of nine candidates in eight of the city's 12 wards. MacLean stood in the Downfield area and returned the party's best result, capturing 242 ballots and 6.1% of the vote; D. McGarry, one of two party candidates in Camperdown, produced the weakest, collecting 1.6% with 123 votes. None of the party's candidates were elected, leading to its quiet dissolution 22 days later. Such a decision was made in conjunction with the previously unaffiliated Glasgow party so that "the national movement could show a united front"; commentators Andrew Murray Scott and Iain MacLeay simply surmise "[n]either group was successful". Dissolved by a motion with seven for and just one against, most of their members duly returned to the SNP, some becoming involved with the party's pirate station Radio Free Scotland. Without the encumbrance of the minor Dundee group, Gordon Wilson was returned as Member of Parliament for Dundee East in February's general election of the following year, concurrently serving as Depute Leader of his party. Wilson later served as Leader of the SNP from 1979 to 1990, succeeding William Wolfe.

== Electoral performance ==
=== House of Commons ===
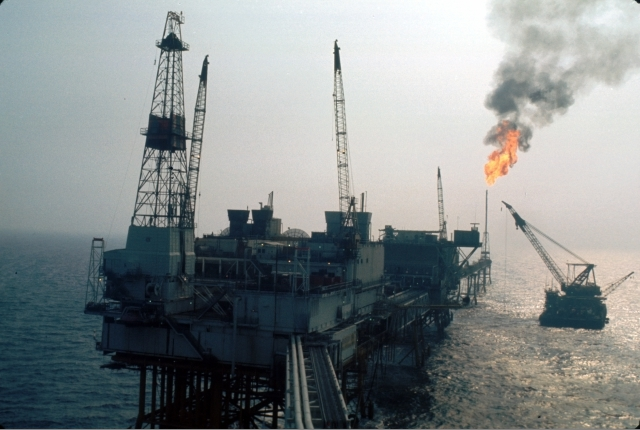
The Scottish National Party (SNP) focused its campaign on the capabilities of Scotland's North Sea oil (rig pictured).

1973 Dundee East by-election
| Party | Candidate | Votes | % | ±% |
|---|---|---|---|---|
| Labour | George Machin | 14,411 | 32.74 | −15.60 |
| SNP | Gordon Wilson | 13,270 | 30.15 | +21.22 |
| Conservative | William Fitzgerald | 11,089 | 25.19 | −17.17 |
| Liberal | Nathaniel Gordon | 3,653 | 8.30 | N/A |
| Labour Party of Scotland | George MacLean | 1,409 | 3.20 | N/A |
| Independent | John S. Thomson | 182 | 0.41 | N/A |
| Majority | | 1,141 | 2.59 | −3.39 |
| Turnout | | 44,014 | 70.0 | −5.97 |
| Labour hold | | Swing | -18.41 | |

=== Local government ===
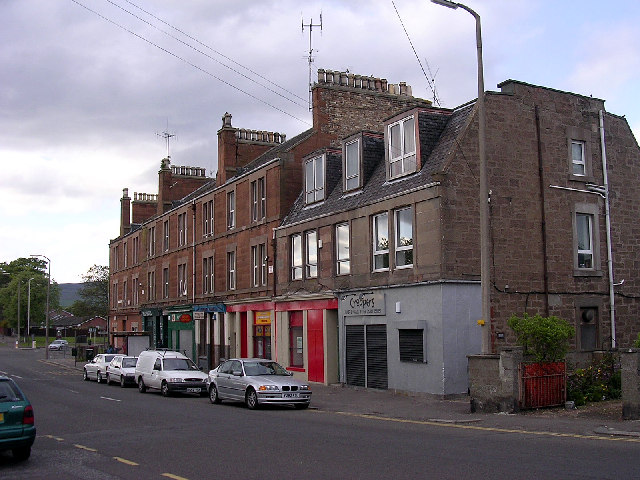
The party's best local election result was in the Dundee suburb of Downfield (pictured).

1973 Dundee City Council election
| Ward | Candidate | No. of votes | % of vote | Outcome |
|---|---|---|---|---|
| Caird | J. Fairweather | 134 | 3.5 | Defeated |
| Camperdown | I. M. Donaldson | 227 | 3.0 | Defeated |
| Camperdown | D. McGarry | 123 | 1.6 | Defeated |
| Craigie | G. McKenzie | 209 | 4.6 | Defeated |
| Douglas | H. Dunning | 94 | 2.0 | Defeated |
| Downfield | G. MacLean | 242 | 6.1 | Defeated |
| Harbour | L. MacQueen | 81 | 2.8 | Defeated |
| Hilltown | J. Alexander | 57 | 2.6 | Defeated |
| Lochee | D. McTaggart | 112 | 2.3 | Defeated |
