= 1973 Aberdeen Corporation election =

Local election in Scotland in 1973

- May 1, 1973

12 out of 36 seats of City of Aberdeen Council 19 seats needed for a majority
- Turnout: 27.4% ▼
	First party	Second party	Third party
Party	Labour	Conservative	Liberal
Seats won	6	5	1
Seats after	23	12	1
Seat change	▼1	▲1	▲1
Popular vote	20,117	13,257	2,617
Percentage	54.6%	36.0%	7.1%
	Fourth party	Fifth party	Sixth party
Party	Communist	Independent	SNP
Seats won	0	0	0
Seats after	0	0	0
Seat change	0	▼1	0
Popular vote	415	265	203
Percentage	1.1%	0.7%	0.6%
- Composition of Corporation after the election

An election to the Aberdeen Corporation was held on 1 May 1973, alongside municipal elections across Scotland. 12 of the corporation's 36 seats were up for election.

The election saw Labour remain in control of the corporation, winning 6 seats, giving them a total of 23. The Conservatives won 5 seats, including one gained from 89-year-old Independent councillor George Roberts, contributing to a total of 12 after the election. Nigel Lindsay caused a major upset when he became the first ever Liberal to be elected to the corporation, unseating the Labour group's leader Thomas Paine in St Machar ward.

== Ward results ==
Ferryhill
Party	Candidate	Votes	%
Labour	Cecil H. Clevitt	2,782	63.5
Conservative	John Watt	1,602	36.5
Majority		1,108	
Turnout			30.8
Labour hold			

Holburn
Party	Candidate	Votes	%
Conservative	Richard Gallagher	1,538	49.7
Labour	Dr. Alexander F. McDonald	1,090	35.2
Independent	George Roberts	265	8.6
SNP	George Rodger	203	6.5
Majority		448	
Turnout			35.4
Conservative gain from Independent			

Mastrick
Party	Candidate	Votes	%
Labour	Robert S. Lennox	2,705	81.1
Conservative	Sheila M. Walker	474	14.2
Communist	William R. Henderson	131	3.9
Majority		2,231	
Turnout			21.3
Labour hold			

Northfield
Party	Candidate	Votes	%
Labour	Margaret Farquhar	1,577	85.8
Conservative	Alexander Stewart Kidd	164	8.9
Communist	Andrew L. Smith	97	5.3
Majority		1,413	
Turnout			15.6
Labour hold			

Rosemount
Party	Candidate	Votes	%
Conservative	John C. Anderson	1,990	53.1
Labour	June Lamond	1,344	35.9
Liberal	Louise Windebank	413	11.0
Majority		646	
Turnout			33.4
Conservative hold			

Rubislaw
Party	Candidate	Votes	%
Conservative	Ronald M. Muir	2,633	77.1
Labour	Jean M. Mackintosh	784	22.9
Majority		1849	
Turnout			31.6
Conservative hold			

Ruthrieston
Party	Candidate	Votes	%
Conservative	Alexander Bremner	2,483	61.6
Labour	Howard G. Lovell	1,547	38.4
Majority		936	
Turnout			32.7
Conservative hold			

St. Clements
Party	Candidate	Votes	%
Labour	Alexander C. Collie (incumbent)	1,263	82.0
Conservative	Kenneth Watmough	222	14.4
Communist	George C. Thomson	56	3.6
Majority		1041	
Turnout			21.4
Labour hold			

St. Machar
Party	Candidate	Votes	%
Liberal	Nigel Lindsay	2,204	47.8
Labour	Thomas Paine	2,114	45.9
Conservative	Hugh S. Birse	211	4.6
Communist	Christopher Ramsey	79	1.7
Majority		90	
Turnout			32.3
Liberal gain from Labour			

St. Nicholas
Party	Candidate	Votes	%
Labour	William P. Craig	1,097	67.3
Conservative	Bernard Morrison	533	32.7
Majority		564	
Turnout			23.6
Labour hold			

Torry
Party	Candidate	Votes	%
Labour	Ellen Williamson	2,052	83.7
Conservative	Gordon Adams	400	16.3
Majority		1652	
Turnout			22.4
Labour hold			

Woodside
Party	Candidate	Votes	%
Labour	Harold Selbie	1,762	62.5
Conservative	Robert Anderson	1,007	35.7
Communist	Norman Williamson	52	1.8
Majority		755	
Turnout			29.8
Labour hold			
