= South Lanarkshire Council elections =

Local government elections in South Lanarkshire, Scotland

South Lanarkshire Council in Scotland holds elections every five years, previously holding them every four years from its creation as a single-tier authority in 1995 to 2007.

== Council elections ==
Year	SNP	Labour	Conservative	Liberal Democrats	Green	Independent
1995	8	61 (Note: Includes Forth, where the election was postponed until 8 June 1995 on account of the death of a candidate.)	2	2	0	0
1999 (Note: New ward boundaries.)	10	54	2	1	0	0
2003	9	51	2	2	0	3
2007 (Note: Change to single transferable vote system and new ward boundaries.)	24	30	8	2	0	3
2012	28	33	3	1	0	2
2017 (Note: New ward boundaries.)	27	22	14	1	0	0
2022	27	24	7	3	1	2

== Results maps ==
2003 results map

2007 results map

2012 results map

2022 results map

== By-elections ==
=== 2003-2007 ===
Bothwell South By-Election 26 August 2004
Party	Candidate	Votes	%	±%
Conservative	Henry Mitchell	594	48.4	+13.2
Labour		377	30.7	−18.1
Liberal Democrats		143	11.7	+11.7
SNP		67	5.5	−10.8
Scottish Senior Citizens		26	2.1	+2.1
Scottish Socialist		20	1.6	+1.6
Majority		217	17.7	
Turnout		1,227		
Conservative gain from Labour		Swing		

Avondale South By-Election 30 March 2006
Party	Candidate	Votes	%	±%
Conservative	Stanley Hogarth	775	50.9	+9.2
Labour	Peter Duff	315	20.6	−6.9
SNP	William Holman	221	14.5	−7.3
Independent	Stuart Brown	79	5.1	+5.1
Green	Kirsten Robb	71	4.6	+4.6
Liberal Democrats	Bernard Hughes	59	3.8	−5.2
Majority		460	30.3	
Turnout		1,520		
Conservative hold		Swing		

Biggar/Symington and Black Mount By-Election 11 May 2006
Party	Candidate	Votes	%	±%
Conservative	Hamish Stewart	816	47.2	+20.3
SNP	Tom Mitchell	523	30.3	−34.3
Independent	Peter Rae	295	17.0	+17.0
Labour	Ralph Barker	87	5.0	3.6
Majority		293	17.0	
Turnout		1,721		
Conservative gain from SNP		Swing		

=== 2007-2012 ===
Cambuslang East By-Election 6 March 2008
Party	Candidate	FPv%	Count							
Party	Candidate	FPv%	1	2	3	4	5	6	7	8
Labour	Richard Tullett	28.0	725	729	739	742	747	922	1,094	1,475
SNP	Christine Deanie	23.5	609	614	621	625	638	728	962	
Liberal Democrats	Tunweer Malik	22.4	580	584	589	593	616	669		
Independent	John McGuinness	19.6	509	510	517	521	538			
Conservative	Malcolm Macaskill	3.1	80	82	82	94				
Scottish Unionist	Jimi Moore	1.5	38	39	40					
Scottish Socialist	David McClemont	1.2	32	35						
Green	Susan Martin	0.8	21							
Labour gain from SNP										
Valid: 2,044 Spoilt: 38 Quota: 1,298 Turnout: 2,082

East Kilbride West By-Election 28 October 2010
Party	Candidate	FPv%	Count					
Party	Candidate	FPv%	1	2	3	4	5	6
Labour	Alan Scott	41.4	847	863	873	892	973	1,297
SNP	Pat McGuire	27.9	571	587	606	641	761	
Conservative	Ian Harrow	19.7	403	427	442	455		
Green	Raymond Burke	4.0	82	85	100			
East Kilbride Alliance	Brian Jones	3.5	71	76				
Liberal Democrats	Gordon Smith	3.4	70					
Labour hold								
Valid: 2,044 Quota: 1,023

East Kilbride West By-Election 22 October 2011
Party	Candidate	FPv%	Count
Party	Candidate	FPv%	1
SNP	John Menzies	50.0	822
Labour	Stuart Gallacher	36.9	607
Conservative	Connar McBain	13.0	214
SNP gain from Independent			
Valid: 1,643 Spoilt: 16 Quota: 822 Turnout: 1,659

=== 2012-2017 ===
Rutherglen South By-Election 14 February 2013
Party	Candidate	FPv%	Count						
Party	Candidate	FPv%	1	2	3	4	5	6	7
Labour	Gerard Killen	39.9	1,352	1,358	1,370	1,376	1,396	1,616	2,090
Liberal Democrats	David Baillie	29.5	999	1,004	1,016	1,035	1,104	1,278	
SNP	Margaret Ferrier	21.0	712	714	730	741	755		
Conservative	Aric Gilinisky	3.8	128	133	134	170			
UKIP	Donald Murdo MacKay	3.3	111	115	120				
Green	Susan Martin	1.7	59	60					
Independent	Craig Smith	0.9	31						
Labour gain from SNP									
Valid: 3,392 Spoilt: 46 Quota: 1,697 Turnout: 3,438

Hamilton South By-Election 24 October 2013
Party	Candidate	FPv%	Count
Party	Candidate	FPv%	1
Labour	Stuart Gallacher	51.7	1,781
SNP	Josh Wilson	32.5	1,120
Conservative	Lynne Nailon	9.4	322
Scottish Christian	Craig Martin	3.9	133
UKIP	Josh Richardson	2.5	86
Labour gain from SNP			
Valid: 3,442 Spoilt: 43 Quota: 1,722 Turnout: 3,485

Clydesdale South By-Election 5 June 2014
Party	Candidate	FPv%	Count				
Party	Candidate	FPv%	1	2	3	4	5
Labour	Gordon Muir	40.8	1,492	1,512	1,559	1,819	2,366
SNP	George Sneddon	32.0	1,170	1,203	1,260	1,356	
Conservative	Donna Hood	18.0	659	674	744		
UKIP	Donald MacKay	6.4	233	247			
Green	Ruth Thomas	2.8	104				
Labour gain from SNP							
Valid: 3,658 Spoilt: 52 Quota: 1,830 Turnout: 3,710

Hamilton South By-Election 6 August 2015
Party	Candidate	FPv%	Count					
Party	Candidate	FPv%	1	2	3	4	5	6
SNP	John Ross	48.0	1,881	1,883	1,888	1,905	1919	1,988
Labour	Jim Lee	35.6	1,396	1,398	1,405	1,410	1,425	1,460
Conservative	Lynne Nailon	8.9	349	349	354	365	389	394
Green	John Kane	3.2	127	128	132	135	146	
Scottish Christian	Craig Smith	2.0	77	80	81	84		
UKIP	Donald Murdo MacKay	1.1	43	44	45			
Liberal Democrats	Matthew Cockburn	0.8	32	34				
Pirate	Andrew McCallum	0.3	13					
SNP hold								
Valid: 3,918 Spoilt: 52 Quota: 1,960 Turnout: 3,970

Blantyre By-Election 10 December 2015
Party	Candidate	FPv%	Count				
Party	Candidate	FPv%	1	2	3	4	5
Labour	Mo Razzaq	47.2	1,476	1,483	1,504	1,536	1,589
SNP	Gerry Chambers	39.6	1,236	1,246	1,259	1,314	1,327
Conservative	Taylor Muir	4.5	140	156	172	173	
Scottish Socialist	Sean Baillie	3.9	122	125	133		
Liberal Democrats	Stephen Reid	2.9	92	97			
UKIP	Emma Jay Docherty	1.9	59				
Labour hold							
Valid: 3,125 Spoilt: 45 Quota: 1,563 Turnout: 3,170

Hamilton North and East By-Election 21 January 2016
Party	Candidate	FPv%	Count				
Party	Candidate	FPv%	1	2	3	4	5
SNP	Stephanie Callaghan	42.9	1,089	1,096	1,138	1,206	1,569
Labour	Lyndsay Clelland	33.6	855	861	878	1,052	
Conservative	James MacKay	18.5	469	480	485		
Green	Steven Hannigan	3.3	83	90			
Liberal Democrats	Norman Rae	1.8	45				
SNP hold							
Valid: 2,541 Spoilt: 31 Quota: 1,271 Turnout: 2,572

=== 2017-2022 ===
Rutherglen Central and North By-Election 23 November 2017
Party	Candidate	FPv%	Count				
Party	Candidate	FPv%	1	2	3	4	5
Labour	Martin Lennon	38.5	1,173	1,176	1,203	1,270	1,541
SNP	David Innes	27.4	836	838	870	884	989
Liberal Democrats	Ellen Bryson	18.2	554	558	574	711	
Conservative	Taylor Muir	12.1	368	377	379		
Green	Brian Finlay	2.9	88	93			
UKIP	Janice MacKay	0.9	28				
Labour hold							
Valid: 3,047 Spoilt: 47 Quota: 1,524 Turnout: 3,094

East Kilbride Central North By-Election 29 August 2019
Party	Candidate	FPv%	Count				
Party	Candidate	FPv%	1	2	3	4	5
SNP	Grant Ferguson	46.5	1,582	1,582	1,588	1,650	1,743
Labour	Kirsty Williams	20.3	690	692	695	715	837
Conservative	Graham Fisher	14.6	498	499	513	519	606
Liberal Democrats	Paul McGarry	12.4	422	424	428	456	
Green	Antony Lee	4.5	153	154	159		
UKIP	David MacKay	1.4	48	50			
Scottish Libertarian	Stephen McNamara	0.4	12				
SNP hold							
Valid: 3,405 Spoilt: 51 Quota: 1,703 Turnout: 3,456

=== 2022-2027 ===
East Kilbride West By-Election 6 July 2023
Party	Candidate	FPv%	Count					
Party	Candidate	FPv%	1	2	3	4	5	6
Labour	Kirsty Williams	40.5	1,386	1,392	1,434	1,469	1,500	1,845
Conservative	Bill Dorrian	26.4	904	914	919	933	937	965
SNP	Robert Gillies	22.7	778	778	785	806	899	
Green	Cameron Eadie	3.8	131	131	139	155		
Independent	Kristofer Keane	2.9	99	112	123			
Liberal Democrats	Jake Stevenson	2.4	83	85				
Scottish Family	Jonathan Jack Richardson	1.2	42					
Labour gain from SNP								
Valid: 3,450 Spoilt: 27 Quota: 1,712 Turnout: 3,477

Larkhall By-Election 9 July 2026
Party	Candidate	FPv%	Count			
Party	Candidate	FPv%	1	2	3	4
Reform	Fiona McDermott	35.2	1,150	1,247	1,380	1,689
SNP	Leigh Payne	29.9	975	1,003	1,239	
Labour	Chris Roarty	24.5	799	897		
Conservative	Gary Burns	10.5	342			
Reform gain from Labour						
Valid: 3,266 Spoilt: 31 Quota: 1,634 Turnout: 3,297

Avondale and Stonehouse By-Election 17 September 2026
Party	Candidate	FPv%	Count								
Party	Candidate	FPv%	1	2	3	4	5	6	7	8	9
SNP	Leigh Payne	27.6	1,025	1,025	1,028	1,044	1,214	1,224	1,287	1,349	1,695
Labour	Hannah Miller	20.0	743	743	746	754	808	871	1,073	1,198	
Reform	George Hobbins	19.6	727	731	735	750	756	832	858		
Liberal Democrats	David Glennie	9.6	357	358	361	386	432	533			
Conservative	Ade Aibinu	10.6	393	397	400	408	412				
Green	Michael Grant	8.2	303	303	314	326					
Independent	Andrew Forde	2.9	107	107	113						
Your Party	Gary Allan	1.2	45	46							
ADF	Ken Thomson	0.3	12								
SNP gain from Independent											
Valid: 3,712 Spoilt: 19 Quota: 1,857 Turnout: 3,731
