= East Kilbride West (ward) =

Electoral ward in South Lanarkshire, Scotland

- South Lanarkshire
- Boundary of East Kilbride West in South Lanarkshire from 2007–2017.
- Population: 13,737 (2021)
- Electorate: 13,412 (2023)
- Major settlements: East Kilbride (part of)
- Scottish Parliament constituency: East Kilbride
- Scottish Parliament region: Central Scotland
- UK Parliament constituency: East Kilbride and Strathaven

Current ward
- Created: 2007
- Number of councillors: 3
- Councillor: Monique McAdams (Labour)
- Councillor: David Watson (Independent)
- Councillor: Kirsty Williams (Labour)
- Created from: East Mains; Hairmyres/Crosshouse; Lindsay; Mossneuk/Kittoch; Stewartfield; West Mains

East Kilbride West is one of the 20 electoral wards of South Lanarkshire Council. Created in 2007, the ward elects three councillors using the single transferable vote electoral system and covers an area with a population of 13,737 people.

The ward has politically been split between the Scottish National Party (SNP), Labour and the Conservatives. Each party had held one of the three seats from the ward's creation until Cllr David Watson resigned from the SNP to become an independent in 2018. The 2022 election saw the SNP regain their seat from the Conservatives.

== Boundaries ==
The ward was created following the Fourth Statutory Reviews of Electoral Arrangements ahead of the 2007 Scottish local elections. As a result of the Local Governance (Scotland) Act 2004, local elections in Scotland would use the single transferable vote electoral system from 2007 onwards so East Kilbride West was formed from an amalgamation of several previous first-past-the-post wards. It contained the majority of the former Stewartfield ward, part of the previous Hairmyres/Crosshouse and Lindsay wards as well as all of the former Mossneuk/Kittoch ward and a small area from each of the former East Mains and West Mains wards. East Kilbride West covers an area in the west of South Lanarkshire next to its boundaries with Glasgow City Council and East Renfrewshire Council. Its territory covers the parts of East Kilbride on the north-west and western peripheries of the town, including the neighbourhoods of Gardenhall, Hairmyres, Mossneuk, Nerston (the brownfield residential developments, but not the older separate hamlet), Newlandsmuir, Philipshill and Stewartfield, plus the College Milton industrial area and the outlying village of Thorntonhall. Following the Fifth Statutory Reviews of Electoral Arrangements ahead of the 2017 Scottish local elections, the ward's boundaries were not changed.

== Councillors ==
Year	Councillors		
2007	Graham Simpson (Conservative)	Michael McCann (Labour)	David Watson (SNP/ Ind.)
2010 by-election	Graham Simpson (Conservative)	Alan Scott (Labour)	David Watson (SNP/ Ind.)
2012	Graham Simpson (Conservative)	Janice McGinlay (Labour)	David Watson (SNP/ Ind.)
2017	Ian Harrow (Conservative)	Monique McAdams (Labour)	David Watson (SNP/ Ind.)
2018	Ian Harrow (Conservative)	Monique McAdams (Labour)	David Watson (SNP/ Ind.)
2022	Ali Salamati (SNP)	Monique McAdams (Labour)	David Watson (SNP/ Ind.)
2023 by-election	Kirsty Williams (Labour)	Monique McAdams (Labour)	David Watson (SNP/ Ind.)

== Election results ==
=== 2023 by-election ===
East Kilbride West by-election (6 July 2023) - 1 seat
Party	Candidate	FPv%	Count					
Party	Candidate	FPv%	1	2	3	4	5	6
Labour	Kirsty Williams	40.5	1,386	1,392	1,434	1,469	1,500	1,845
Conservative	Bill Dorrian	26.4	904	914	919	933	937	965
SNP	Robert Gillies	22.7	778	778	785	806	899	
Scottish Green	Cameron Eadie	3.8	131	131	139	155		
Independent	Kristofer Keane	2.9	99	112	123			
Liberal Democrats	Jake Stevenson	2.4	83	85				
Scottish Family	Jonathan Jack Richardson	1.2	42					
Electorate: 13,412 Valid: 3,450 Spoilt: 27 Quota: 1,712 Turnout: 25.7%

=== 2022 election ===
East Kilbride West - 3 seats
Party	Candidate	FPv%	Count							
Party	Candidate	FPv%	1	2	3	4	5	6	7	8
Labour	Monique McAdams (incumbent)	26.5	1,780							
Conservative	Ian Harrow (incumbent)	20.0	1,339	1,358	1,360	1,395	1,426	1,441	1,448	
Independent	David Watson (incumbent)	18.6	1,248	1,269	1,270	1,309	1,365	1,458	1,555	2,220
SNP	Craig Sloan	15.5	1,041	1,048	1,049	1,053	1,068			
SNP	Ali Salamati	15.4	1,031	1,039	1,040	1,051	1,072	1,962		
Liberal Democrats	Huaiquan Zhang	2.1	142	158	158	166				
Scottish Family	Denise Hay	1.6	110	112	121					
UKIP	Yvonne MacKay	0.3	18	18						
Electorate: 13,319 Valid: 6,709 Spoilt: 70 Quota: 1,678 Turnout: 50.9%

=== 2017 election ===
East Kilbride West - 3 seats
Party	Candidate	FPv%	Count						
Party	Candidate	FPv%	1	2	3	4	5	6	7
Conservative	Ian Harrow	37.3	2,363						
Labour	Monique McAdams	20.7	1,315	1,529	1,571	1,612			
SNP	David Watson (incumbent) (Note: On 1 November 2018, East Kilbride West SNP councillor David Watson resigned from the party and became an independent after a legal dispute over an employee grievance.)	20.5	1,298	1,319	1,322	1,370	1,373	1,427	2,389
SNP	Ali Salamati	14.2	900	914	917	986	988	1,065	
Liberal Democrats	Ewan McRobert	3.5	223	374	397	447	458		
Scottish Green	Billy McLean	3.1	194	216	229				
UKIP	David Mackay	0.8	49	140					
Electorate: 12,151 Valid: 6,342 Spoilt: 74 Quota: 1,586 Turnout: 52.8%

=== 2012 election ===
East Kilbride West - 3 seats
Party	Candidate	FPv%	Count					
Party	Candidate	FPv%	1	2	3	4	5	6
Conservative	Graham Simpson (incumbent)	25.3	1,197					
SNP	David Watson (incumbent)	24.2	1,148	1,150	1,188			
Labour	Janice McGinlay	17.0	805	806	849	849	975	1,741
Labour	Alan Scott (incumbent)	16.9	800	801	823	823	916	
SNP	John Reilly	12.2	579	580	605	607		
East Kilbride Alliance	Brian Jones	4.5	211	213				
Electorate: 12,092 Valid: 4,740 Spoilt: 44 Quota: 1,186 Turnout: 39.2%

=== 2010 by-election ===
East Kilbride West by-election (28 October 2010) - 1 seat
Party	Candidate	FPv%	Count					
Party	Candidate	FPv%	1	2	3	4	5	6
Labour	Alan Scott	41.4	847	863	873	892	973	1,297
SNP	Pat McGuire	27.9	571	587	606	641	761	
Conservative	Ian Harrow	19.7	403	427	442	455		
Scottish Green	Raymond Burke	4.0	82	85	100			
East Kilbride Alliance	Brian Jones	3.5	71	76				
Liberal Democrats	Gordon Smith	3.4	70					
Electorate: 12,024 Valid: 2,044 Quota: 1,023 Turnout: 17.0%

=== 2007 election ===
East Kilbride West - 3 seats
Party	Candidate	FPv%	Count						
Party	Candidate	FPv%	1	2	3	4	5	6	7
SNP	David Watson (Note: Returning councillor for Hairmyres/Crosshouse single-member ward.)	30.2	1,861						
Labour	Michael McCann (Note: Returning councillor for Mossneuk/Kittoch single-member ward.) (Note: East Kilbride West councillor Michael McCann was elected as MP for East Kilbride, Strathaven and Lesmahagow in May 2010 and he subsequently resigned his council seat. A by-election, held on 28 October 2010, was won by Labour's Alan Scott.)	29.4	1,805						
Conservative	Graham Simpson	14.0	860	906	919	941	1,019	1,197	???
Labour	Margaret McCulloch	11.2	688	730	914	956	1,000	1,195	
Liberal Democrats	Pauline Aaron	7.1	437	501	519	615	725		
East Kilbride Alliance	Brian Jones	4.2	259	289	295	348			
Scottish Green	Kitty MacKenzie	3.8	232	283	292				
Electorate: 10,938 Valid: 6,142 Quota: 1,536 Turnout: 56.7%
