= Robert Brown (Scottish politician) =

Scottish politician (born 1947)

Cllr Robert Brown CBE
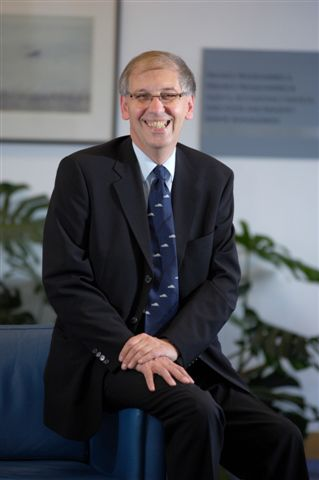
- Official portrait, 2005

Member of the South Lanarkshire Council for Rutherglen South
- Incumbent
- Assumed office 3 May 2012
- Preceded by: Eileen Baxendale

Member of the Scottish Parliament for Glasgow (1 of 7 Regional MSPs)
- In office 6 May 1999 – 22 March 2011
- Preceded by: New position
- Succeeded by: Anne McTaggart

Personal details
- Born: 25 December 1947 (age 78) Newcastle-upon-Tyne, England
- Party: Scottish Liberal Democrats
- Education: University of Aberdeen

Robert Edward Brown CBE (born 25 December 1947) is a Scottish Liberal Democrat politician. He was a Member of the Scottish Parliament (MSP) for the Glasgow region from 1999 to 2011.

== Career ==
A graduate of the University of Aberdeen, he was Depute Procurator Fiscal of Dumbarton 1972−1974 and has since been a partner and consultant with a Glasgow firm of solicitors. He was a Glasgow City councillor (Liberal) for several years in the 1970s and 1980s and was Convener of the Scottish Liberal Democrat Policy Committee for much of the 1990s and 2000s. He was first elected to the Scottish Parliament in its first election in 1999.

Following Nicol Stephen's election as party leader and succession as Deputy First Minister of Scotland in 2005, Brown was appointed Deputy Minister for Education and Young People in the Scottish Executive.

He was second on the Liberal Democrat list of candidates for Glasgow region in the 2011 Scottish Parliament election but was unsuccessful when the party failed to gain any list seats.

In May 2012, he was elected as a councillor for the Rutherglen South ward on South Lanarkshire Council, and retained the seat at the 2017 elections; being the only Liberal Democrat representative in the council out of 64 seats. He was an unsuccessful candidate for the Rutherglen and Hamilton West constituency at the 2017 UK general election, losing his deposit after receiving only 4% of the vote.

Brown was appointed Commander of the Order of the British Empire (CBE) in the 2014 New Year Honours for political service. He currently resides in Burnside, in the south of Greater Glasgow.

== See also ==
- List of Scottish Executive Ministerial Teams
