= East Kilbride, Strathaven and Lesmahagow =

UK Parliament constituency (2005–2024)

Coordinates: 55.390°N 3.661°W

- Former county constituency for the House of Commons
- Boundary of East Kilbride, Strathaven and Lesmahagow in Scotland
- Subdivision: South Lanarkshire
- Major settlements: East Kilbride, Strathaven, Lesmahagow

2005–2024
- Created from: East Kilbride; Clydesdale
- Replaced by: East Kilbride and Strathaven

East Kilbride, Strathaven and Lesmahagow was a county constituency of the House of Commons of the Parliament of the United Kingdom, which was first used in the general election of 2005. It replaced East Kilbride and some of Clydesdale, and it elected one Member of Parliament (MP) by the first past the post system of election.

Further to the completion of the 2023 Periodic Review of Westminster constituencies, the seat was subject to boundary changes which included the loss of Lesmahagow. As a consequence, the relevant seat was renamed East Kilbride and Strathaven, first contested at the 2024 general election.

== Boundaries ==
Map of boundaries 2005–2024

As created by the Fifth Review of the Boundary Commission for Scotland, the constituency covered part of the South Lanarkshire council area. The rest of the council area was covered by the Dumfriesshire, Clydesdale and Tweeddale, Lanark and Hamilton East, and Rutherglen and Hamilton West. constituencies. The Dumfriesshire, Clydesdale and Tweeddale constituency also covered part of the Dumfries and Galloway council area and part of the Scottish Borders council area.

The terms of the East Kilbride, Strathaven and Lesmahagow name refer to the towns of East Kilbride, Strathaven and Lesmahagow. However, the constituency also included the settlements of Auldhouse, Blackwood, Caldermill, Chapelton, Drumclog, Glassford, Kirkmuirhill, Jackton, Nerston, Stonehouse and Thorntonhall.

The following electoral wards formed the constituency:

- In full: Avondale and Stonehouse, East Kilbride Central North, East Kilbride Central South, East Kilbride East, East Kilbride South, East Kilbride West
- In part: Clydesdale South, Clydesdale West

== History ==
Until the SNP landslide at the 2015 election, the constituency, and its predecessors East Kilbride, Lanark, and Clydesdale, had been represented continuously by the Labour party since the late 1950s. Following the defection of sitting MP Lisa Cameron in October 2023 from the SNP, the constituency was represented by the Conservative Party for the first time.

== Members of Parliament ==
Election	Member	Party	Notes
2005	Adam Ingram	Labour Party	Previously MP for East Kilbride
2010	Michael McCann	Labour Party	
2015	Lisa Cameron	Scottish National Party	
2023	Lisa Cameron	Conservative	

== Election results ==
=== Elections in the 2010s ===
2019 general election: East Kilbride, Strathaven and Lesmahagow
Party	Candidate	Votes	%	±%
SNP	Lisa Cameron	26,113	46.4	+7.5
Labour	Monique McAdams	12,791	22.7	−9.0
Conservative	Gail Macgregor	11,961	21.2	−4.1
Liberal Democrats	Ewan McRobert	3,760	6.7	+3.8
Green	Erica Bradley-Young	1,153	2.0	New
UKIP	David MacKay	559	1.0	−0.2
Majority		13,322	23.7	+16.5
Turnout		56,337	69.4	+2.1
SNP hold		Swing	+8.2	

2017 general election: East Kilbride, Strathaven and Lesmahagow
Party	Candidate	Votes	%	±%
SNP	Lisa Cameron	21,023	38.9	−16.7
Labour	Monique McAdams	17,157	31.7	+3.4
Conservative	Mark McGeever	13,704	25.3	+13.5
Liberal Democrats	Paul McGarry	1,590	2.9	+1.2
UKIP	Janice MacKay	628	1.2	−0.8
Majority		3,866	7.2	−20.1
Turnout		54,102	67.3	−5.5
SNP hold		Swing	−10.1	

2015 general election: East Kilbride, Strathaven and Lesmahagow
Party	Candidate	Votes	%	±%
SNP	Lisa Cameron	33,678	55.6	+32.6
Labour	Michael McCann	17,151	28.3	−23.2
Conservative	Graham Simpson	7,129	11.8	−1.2
UKIP	Rob Sale	1,221	2.0	New
Liberal Democrats	Paul McGarry	1,042	1.7	−8.2
Independent	John Houston	318	0.5	−0.1
Majority		16,527	27.3	N/A
Turnout		60,539	72.8	+6.2
SNP gain from Labour		Swing	+27.9	

2010 general election: East Kilbride, Strathaven and Lesmahagow
Party	Candidate	Votes	%	±%
Labour	Michael McCann	26,241	51.5	+2.8
SNP	John McKenna	11,738	23.0	+5.1
Conservative	Graham Simpson	6,613	13.0	+3.0
Liberal Democrats	John Loughton	5,052	9.9	−6.7
Green	Kirsten Robb	1,003	2.0	−1.3
Independent	John Houston	299	0.6	+0.3
Majority		14,503	28.5	−2.3
Turnout		50,946	66.6	+3.1
Labour hold		Swing	−1.2	

=== Elections in the 2000s ===
2005 general election: East Kilbride, Strathaven and Lesmahagow
Party	Candidate	Votes	%	±%
Labour	Adam Ingram	23,264	48.7	−4.3
SNP	Douglas Edwards	8,541	17.9	−5.8
Liberal Democrats	John Oswald	7,904	16.6	+6.6
Conservative	Tony Lewis	4,776	10.0	+0.3
Green	Kirsten Robb	1,575	3.3	New
Independent	Rose Gentle	1,513	3.2	New
Independent	John Houston	160	0.3	New
Majority		14,723	30.8	
Turnout		47,733	63.5	+1.6
Labour win (new seat)				
