= 2007 South Lanarkshire Council election =

South Lanarkshire Council election

← 2003	3 May 2007	2012 →

All 67 seats to South Lanarkshire Council 34 seats needed for a majority
- Registered: 242,455
- Turnout: 51.2%
	First party	Second party
	Lab	SNP
Leader	Edward McAvoy
Party	Labour	SNP
Leader's seat	Rutherglen Central and North
Last election	52 seats, 49.1%	7 seats, 27.4%
Seats won	30	24
Seat change	▼22	▲17
Popular vote	49,906	35,866
Percentage	39.6%	29.2%
Swing	▼9.5%	▲1.8%
	Third party	Fourth party
	Con	Ind
Party	Conservative	Independent
Last election	3 seats, 13.5%	3 seats, 3.2%
Seats won	8	3
Seat change	▲5	Steady
Popular vote	15,924	6,422
Percentage	12.9%	5.2%
Swing	▼0.6%	▲3.0%
	Fifth party
	LD
Party	Liberal Democrats
Last election	2 seat, 4.7%
Seats won	2
Seat change	Steady
Popular vote	8,897
Percentage	7.2%
Swing	▲2.5%
- Results by ward.
Council Leader before election
Edward McAvoy
Labour
Council Leader after election
Edward McAvoy
Labour

Elections to South Lanarkshire Council took place on 3 May 2007 on the same day as the 31 other Scottish local government elections.

The election was the first to use the 20 new wards created as a result of the Local Governance (Scotland) Act 2004, each ward electing three or four councillors using the single transferable vote system form of proportional representation. The new wards replaced the 67 single-member wards which used the plurality (first past the post) system of election.

Labour retained their position as the largest party on the council but were no longer in overall control after the introduction of proportional voting saw them lose 22 seats. The Scottish National Party (SNP) recorded their best result in a South Lanarkshire election as they gained 17 seats to remain the second-largest party. The Conservatives also made gains to hold eight seats. The number of independent candidates elected with remained at three and the number of Liberal Democrats remained at two.

== Results ==
2007 South Lanarkshire Council election result
Party	Seats	Gains	Losses	Net gain/loss	Seats %	Votes %	Votes	+/−
Labour	30			▼22	44.8	39.6	49,906	▼9.5
SNP	24			▲17	35.8	29.2	35,866	▲1.8
Conservative	8			▲5	11.9	12.9	15,924	▼0.6
Independent	3			Steady	4.5	5.2	6,422	▲2.0
Liberal Democrats	2			Steady	3.0	7.2	8,897	▲2.5
Scottish Green	0			Steady	0.0	2.7	3,354	New
East Kilbride Alliance	0			Steady	0.0	1.2	1,511	New
Scottish Socialist	0			Steady	0.0	0.8	966	▼1.3
Scottish Unionist	0			Steady	0.0	0.7	912	New
Solidarity	0			Steady	0.0	0.2	261	New
Scottish Christian	0			Steady	0.0	0.1	180	New
Total	67						124,199	

Note: Votes are the sum of first preference votes across all council wards. The net gain/loss and percentage changes relate to the result of the previous Scottish local elections on 1 May 2003. This is because STV has an element of proportionality which is not present unless multiple seats are being elected. This may differ from other published sources showing gain/loss relative to seats held at the dissolution of Scotland's councils. This was the first election to use the STV electoral system so only net gains/losses are shown.

== Ward results ==
=== Clydesdale West ===
Clydesdale West - 4 seats
Party	Candidate	FPv%	Count						
Party	Candidate	FPv%	1	2	3	4	5	6	7
Labour	Eileen Logan (Note: Returning councillor for Carluke/Whitehill single-member ward.)	33.5	2,549						
SNP	Ian Gray (Note: Returning councillor for Forth single-member ward.)	25.6	1,948						
Conservative	Alex Allison	12.9	984	1,025	1,050	???	1,126	1,259	???
SNP	David Shearer (Note: Returning councillor for Law/Carluke single-member ward.)	12.2	925	1,005	1,279	???	1,360	1,504	???
Liberal Democrats	Peter Meehan	6.4	490	566	602	???	707		
Labour	Betty Rush (Note: Returning councillor for Clyde Valley single-member ward.)	4.7	359	933	949	???	989	1,131	
Scottish Christian	Robin Mawhinney	2.4	180	198	207	???			
Scottish Green	Ruth Thomas	2.3	174	193	203				
Electorate: 14,775 Valid: 7,645 Quota: 1,522 Turnout: 52.4%

=== Clydesdale North ===
Clydesdale North - 3 seats
Party	Candidate	FPv%	Count					
Party	Candidate	FPv%	1	2	3	4	5	6
SNP	George Sutherland	24.8	1,468	1,521				
Labour	Mary McNeill (Note: Returning councillor for Lanark North single-member ward.)	20.9	1,237	1,270	1,273	1,483		
Conservative	Patrick Ross-Taylor	18.4	1,090	1,130	1,135	1,381	???	???
Labour	Brian Reilly (Note: Returning councillor for Lanark South single-member ward.)	17.2	1,019	1,029	1,033	1,231	???	
Liberal Democrats	Kenny Douglas	14.2	841	927	939			
Scottish Green	Thomas Davidson	4.5	265					
Electorate: 11,430 Valid: 5,920 Quota: 1,481 Turnout: 52.7%

=== Clydesdale East ===
Clydesdale East - 3 seats
Party	Candidate	FPv%	Count						
Party	Candidate	FPv%	1	2	3	4	5	6	7
Conservative	Beith Forrest (Note: Returning councillor for Duneaton/Carmichael single-member ward.)	22.5	1,204	???	1,252	1,325	1,364		
Conservative	Hamish Stewart	19.6	1,048	???	1,105	1,175	1,209	???	???
SNP	Bev Gauld (Note: Returning councillor for Carstairs/Carnwath single-member ward.)	19.5	1,042	???	1,093	1,630			
Labour	Ralph Barker	15.5	832	???	937	989	1,056	???	
SNP	Tom Mitchell	15.4	824	???	864				
Liberal Democrats	Ron Waddell	5.7	305	???					
Independent	Tom Dalbindle	1.9	101						
Electorate: 9,907 Valid: 5,356 Quota: 1,340 Turnout: 54.8%

=== Clydesdale South ===
Clydesdale South - 3 seats
Party	Candidate	FPv%	Count				
Party	Candidate	FPv%	1	2	3	4	5
Labour	Danny Meikle (Note: Returning councillor for Douglas single-member ward.)	27.7	1,709				
Labour	Alex McInnes (Note: Returning councillor for Lesmahagow single-member ward.)	20.2	1,245	1,351	???	1,514	???
SNP	Archie Manson (Note: Returning councillor for Blackwood single-member ward.)	18.7	1,156	1,164	???	1,341	???
SNP	David Smart	18.6	1,148	1,159	???	1,334	
Conservative	John Baillie	11.9	734	740	???		
Scottish Green	Billy McLean	3.0	183	185			
Electorate: 11,359 Valid: 6,175 Quota: 1,544 Turnout: 55.6%

=== Avondale and Stonehouse ===
Avondale and Stonehouse - 4 seats
Party	Candidate	FPv%	Count							
Party	Candidate	FPv%	1	2	3	4	5	6	7	8
SNP	William Holman	27.6	1,989							
Conservative	Graeme Campbell	19.2	1,384	1,450						
Labour	James Malloy (Note: Returning councillor for Avondale North single-member ward.)	14.9	1,071	1,127	1,128	1,140	1,155	1,226	1,356	???
Independent	Lynn Filshie	11.1	797	858	860	975	1,127	1,205	1,348	???
Labour	Ian McInnes	10.9	788	816	816	824	830	867	922	
Liberal Democrats	Nigel Benzies	5.7	414	496	498	511	536	646		
Scottish Green	John Innes	4.6	333	406	406	416	449			
Independent	Stuart Brown	3.3	238	266	267	304				
Independent	Frank Reilly	2.7	198	217	218					
Electorate: 13,144 Valid: 6,912 Quota: 1,443 Turnout: 55.7%

=== East Kilbride South ===
East Kilbride South - 3 seats
Party	Candidate	FPv%	Count							
Party	Candidate	FPv%	1	2	3	4	5	6	7	8
SNP	Archie Buchanan (Note: Returning councillor for Greenhills single-member ward.)	42.7	2,431							
Labour	Jim Docherty (Note: Returning councillor for Whitehills single-member ward.)	33.3	1,900							
East Kilbride Alliance	Colin McKay	6.3	358	413	466	478	506	585	???	
Conservative	Gillian Alexander	6.2	356	394	429	454	441	460		
SNP	Douglas Edwards	5.2	294	878	941	956	1,014	1,101	???	???
Scottish Green	Drew Campbell	2.9	167	222	272	291	323			
Solidarity	John Park	2.3	129	167	194	224				
Scottish Socialist	Lynsey MacGregor	1.1	63	85	107					
Electorate: 11,701 Valid: 5,698 Quota: 1,425 Turnout: 49.5%

=== East Kilbride Central South ===
East Kilbride Central South - 3 seats
Party	Candidate	FPv%	Count							
Party	Candidate	FPv%	1	2	3	4	5	6	7	8
SNP	John Anderson	32.0	1,970							
Labour	Gerry Convery (Note: Returning councillor for Heatheryknowe single-member ward.)	27.5	1,692							
Labour	Pat Watters (Note: Returning councillor for Headhouse single-member ward.)	17.7	1,089	1,145	1,247	1,281	1,329	1,388	???	???
Conservative	Anne Stewart	6.2	383	408	410	414	466			
Liberal Democrats	Colin Linskey	5.1	316	378	387	408	481	601	???	
East Kilbride Alliance	Iain Cameron	5.0	309	362	367	387				
Scottish Green	Alison Campbell	4.1	254	326	331	396	507	584		
Scottish Socialist	Mark Sands	2.4	150	194	198					
Electorate: 11,524 Valid: 6,163 Quota: 1,541 Turnout: 54.8%

=== East Kilbride Central North ===
East Kilbride Central North - 4 seats
Party	Candidate	FPv%	Count									
Party	Candidate	FPv%	1	2	3	4	5	6	7	8	9	10
SNP	Anne Maggs (Note: Returning councillor for Blacklaw single-member ward.)	28.3	2,248									
Labour	Alice Mitchell (Note: Returning councillor for East Mains single-member ward.)	23.9	1,899									
Labour	Christopher Thompson (Note: Returning councillor for Maxwellton single-member ward.)	15.5	1,229	1,269	1,456	1,477	1,482	1,513	1,617			
Conservative	Isobel Perratt	6.9	545	563	571	575	584	618	679	681		
SNP	Sheena Wardhaugh	6.8	538	927	937	969	982	1,059	1,149	1,154	1,264	???
Scottish Green	Raymond Burke	6.3	500	542	555	594	610	690	817	821	963	
Liberal Democrats	Gordon Smith	5.6	446	480	499	520	524	570				
East Kilbride Alliance	Clare Keane	2.9	227	242	250	259	383					
East Kilbride Alliance	Tim Gingell	2.1	169	179	183	185						
Scottish Socialist	Catherine Pedersen	1.6	130	149	154							
Electorate: 14,310 Valid: 7,931 Quota: 1,587 Turnout: 57.0%

=== East Kilbride West ===
East Kilbride West - 3 seats
Party	Candidate	FPv%	Count						
Party	Candidate	FPv%	1	2	3	4	5	6	7
SNP	David Watson (Note: Returning councillor for Hairmyres/Crosshouse single-member ward.)	30.2	1,861						
Labour	Michael McCann (Note: Returning councillor for Mossneuk/Kittoch single-member ward.) (Note: East Kilbride West councillor Michael McCann was elected as MP for East Kilbride, Strathaven and Lesmahagow in May 2010 and he subsequently resigned his council seat. A by-election, held on 28 October 2010, was won by Labour's Alan Scott.)	29.4	1,805						
Conservative	Graham Simpson	14.0	860	906	919	941	1,019	1,197	???
Labour	Margaret McCulloch	11.2	688	730	914	956	1,000	1,195	
Liberal Democrats	Pauline Aaron	7.1	437	501	519	615	725		
East Kilbride Alliance	Brian Jones	4.2	259	289	295	348			
Scottish Green	Kitty MacKenzie	3.8	232	283	292				
Electorate: 10,938 Valid: 6,142 Quota: 1,536 Turnout: 56.7%

=== East Kilbride East ===
East Kilbride East - 3 seats
Party	Candidate	FPv%	Count							
Party	Candidate	FPv%	1	2	3	4	5	6	7	8
SNP	Jim Wardhaugh	36.2	1,896							
Labour	John Cairney	27.0	1,414							
Labour	Graham Scott (Note: Returning councillor for Westwoodhill single-member ward.)	12.2	639	708	779	802	833	883	1,033	???
Conservative	Ian Harrow	9.4	493	551	554	570	596	625	747	
Liberal Democrats	Mark Watson	5.2	271	376	381	397	436	565		
Scottish Green	Andrew Williamson	4.0	210	325	329	359	426			
East Kilbride Alliance	Richard Naismith	3.6	189	236	238	264				
Independent	John Doyle	2.3	122	160	163					
Electorate: 9,765 Valid: 5,234 Quota: 1,309 Turnout: 54.6%

=== Rutherglen South ===
Rutherglen South - 3 seats
Party	Candidate	FPv%	Count									
Party	Candidate	FPv%	1	2	3	4	5	6	7	8	9	10
Labour	Brian McKenna (Note: Returning councillor for Burgh single-member ward.)	24.7	1,534	1,548	1,565							
Liberal Democrats	Eileen Baxendale	17.3	1,077	1,082	1,092	1,092	???	1,174	1,597			
SNP	Anne Higgins	16.8	1,045	1,070	1,074	1,074	???	1,159	1,195	1,204	1,303	???
Labour	Patricia Osborne (Note: Returning councillor for Fernhill single-member ward.)	13.6	846	857	864	871	???	951	970	976	1,035	
Conservative	Jean Miller	8.5	529	530	588	588	???	630	649	657		
Liberal Democrats	Danny Campbell	8.1	506	507	510	510	???	550				
Independent	Brian McCutcheon	4.6	285	293	303	303	???					
Scottish Green	Michael Tobin	2.4	150	176	178	178						
Scottish Unionist	Michael A Haigh	2.2	135	138								
Scottish Socialist	John Patrick	1.7	106									
Electorate: 11,376 Valid: 6,213 Quota: 1,554 Turnout: 55.8%

=== Rutherglen Central and North ===
Rutherglen Central and North - 3 seats
Party	Candidate	FPv%	Count							
Party	Candidate	FPv%	1	2	3	4	5	6	7	8
Labour	Eddie McAvoy (Note: Returning councillor for Bankhead single-member ward.)	35.1	1,833							
SNP	Gordon Clark	22.9	1,198	1,233	1,273	1,286	1,355			
Labour	Denis McKenna (Note: Returning councillor for Rutherglen West single-member ward.)	15.0	786	1,162	1,180	1,191	1,221	???	???	???
Liberal Democrats	Janette Little	12.7	666	692	702	721	781	???	???	
Conservative	Ian Raeburn	5.4	283	288	291	371	376	???		
Scottish Green	Susan Martin	3.4	176	182	210	216				
Scottish Unionist	Jim Nixon	3.0	157	159	162					
Scottish Socialist	John Starrs	2.4	126	129						
Electorate: 10,867 Valid: 5,225 Quota: 1,307 Turnout: 49.1%

=== Cambuslang West ===
Cambuslang West - 3 seats
Party	Candidate	FPv%	Count						
Party	Candidate	FPv%	1	2	3	4	5	6	7
Labour	Russell Clearie (Note: Returning councillor for Cathkin/Springhall single-member ward.)	20.5	1,253	1,264	???	1,294	1,386	???	???
Labour	John McGuinness (Note: Returning councillor for Eastfield single-member ward.)	20.0	1,225	1,238	???	1,264	1,305	???	
SNP	Clare McColl	19.8	1,209	1,240	???	1,307	1,409	???	???
Liberal Democrats	David Baillie (Note: Returning councillor for Kirkhill/Whitlawburn single-member ward.)	19.5	1,191	1,206	???	1,294	1,597		
Conservative	Malcolm Macaskill	12.6	772	774	???	844			
Scottish Green	Christian Schmidt	3.1	187	207	???				
Scottish Unionist	Jimi Moore	2.5	154	161					
Scottish Socialist	David McClemont	2.1	130						
Electorate: 11,591 Valid: 6,121 Quota: 1,531 Turnout: 53.7%

=== Cambuslang East ===
Cambuslang East - 3 seats
Party	Candidate	FPv%	Count			
Party	Candidate	FPv%	1	2	3	4
Labour	Walter Brogan	32.4	1,544			
SNP	John Higgins (Note: Cambuslang East councillor John Higgins died on 29 December 2007. A by-election, held on 6 March 2008, was won by Labour's Richard Tullett.)	23.5	1,120	1,139	1,181	1,267
Labour	Pam Clearie (Note: Returning councillor for Cairns single-member ward.)	18.0	859	1,117	1,152	1,224
Liberal Democrats	Tunweer Malik	14.3	684	696	716	845
Conservative	Louise Ann Campbell	8.9	423	428	437	
Scottish Socialist	David Stevenson	2.9	137	146		
Electorate: 10,394 Valid: 4,767 Quota: 1,192 Turnout: 46.9%

=== Blantyre ===
Blantyre - 4 seats
Party	Candidate	FPv%	Count					
Party	Candidate	FPv%	1	2	3	4	5	6
Labour	Hugh Dunsmuir	24.6	1,586					
Independent	Bert Thomson (Note: Returning councillor for High Blantyre single-member ward.) (Note: Blantyre councillor Bert Thomson subsequently joined the SNP and ceased to be an independent.)	21.2	1,365					
SNP	John McNamee (Note: On 1 February 2010, Blantyre councillor John McNamee resigned from the SNP and joined Labour.)	19.4	1,253	1,339				
Labour	Jim Handibode (Note: Returning councillor for Coatshill/Low Blantyre single-member ward.)	17.4	1,121	1,260	1,270	???	???	???
Independent	Michael McGlynn (Note: Returning councillor for Blantyre West single-member ward.)	11.6	748	764	783	???	???	???
Conservative	Morag Redpath	5.1	327	329	332	???	???	
Independent	Gavin Wallace	0.8	52	53	66	???		
Electorate: 13,782 Valid: 6,452 Quota: 1,291 Turnout: 48.0%

=== Bothwell and Uddingston ===
Bothwell and Uddingston - 3 seats
Party	Candidate	FPv%	Count						
Party	Candidate	FPv%	1	2	3	4	5	6	7
Conservative	Henry Mitchell (Note: Returning councillor for Bothwell South single-member ward.)	30.0	1,615						
Labour	Maureen Devlin (Note: Returning councillor for Whitehill single-member ward.)	24.0	1,292	1,315	1,329	1,347			
SNP	Jim McGuigan	18.6	998	1,032	1,089	1,120	1,120	1,324	???
Labour	Pat Morgan (Note: Returning councillor for Uddingston single-member ward.)	12.9	696	709	721	739	741	861	
Liberal Democrats	Douglas Herbison	8.9	477	553	562	633	634		
Scottish Green	Kenneth Robb	3.1	168	187	214				
Solidarity	Denis Reilly	2.5	132	135					
Electorate: 9,788 Valid: 5,378 Quota: 1,345 Turnout: 55.8%

=== Hamilton North and East ===
Hamilton North and East - 3 seats
Party	Candidate	FPv%	Count					
Party	Candidate	FPv%	1	2	3	4	5	6
SNP	Barry Douglas	31.3	1,769					
Labour	David McLachlan	23.6	1,335	1,382	1,401	1,456		
Labour	Mary Smith (Note: Returning councillor for Hamilton Centre/Ferniegair single-member ward.)	21.6	1,221	1,255	1,273	1,305	???	???
Conservative	Andrew Leitch	16.2	917	974	990	1,112	???	
Independent	James Ward	3.8	214	246				
Independent	Hugh Clements	3.4	190	251	394			
Electorate: 12,084 Valid: 5,646 Quota: 1,412 Turnout: 48.0%

=== Hamilton West and Earnock ===
Hamilton West and Earnock - 4 seats
Party	Candidate	FPv%	Count						
Party	Candidate	FPv%	1	2	3	4	5	6	7
Labour	Allan Falconer (Note: Returning councillor for Wellhall/Earnock single-member ward.)	26.4	1,670						
SNP	Graeme Horne (Note: Returning councillor for Hillhouse single-member ward.)	25.1	1,591						
Independent	Tommy Gilligan (Note: Returning councillor for Earnock single-member ward.) (Note: Hamilton West and Earnock councillor Tommy Gilligan dies on 22 October 2011. A by-election, held on 8 December 2011, was won by the SNP's John Menzies.)	22.6	1,433						
Labour	Jean McKeown	11.7	743	1,006	1,064	1,088	1,127	???	???
Conservative	John Anderson	9.6	606	622	671	713	732	???	
Scottish Green	Scot Graham	2.6	167	180	232	261	320		
Scottish Socialist	Gordon McGovern	2.0	124	138	182	192			
Electorate: 13,749 Valid: 6,334 Quota: 1,267 Turnout: 46.9%

=== Hamilton South ===
Hamilton South - 4 seats
Party	Candidate	FPv%	Count							
Party	Candidate	FPv%	1	2	3	4	5	6	7	8
Labour	Joe Lowe (Note: Returning councillor for Low Waters single-member ward.)	34.9	2,626							
SNP	Bobby Lawson	23.8	1,791							
Labour	Brian McCaig (Note: Returning councillor for Silvertonhill single-member ward.)	13.4	1,005	1,685						
Conservative	John Murray	10.7	808	837	872	883	906	942	1,121	???
Independent	John Carracher	6.2	464	531	564	584	611	740	876	
Liberal Democrats	John Oswald	5.7	427	459	509	532	633	664		
Independent	David Holland	2.9	215	255	276	283	300			
Scottish Green	Denize McBride	2.5	188	219	265	276				
Electorate: 15,037 Valid: 7,524 Quota: 1,505 Turnout: 51.0%

=== Larkhall ===
Larkhall - 4 seats
Party	Candidate	FPv%	Count						
Party	Candidate	FPv%	1	2	3	4	5	6	7
Labour	Jackie Burns (Note: Returning councillor for Larkhall South single-member ward.)	38.0	2,699						
SNP	Peter Craig	17.8	1,264	1,335	1,387	1,437			
SNP	Lesley McDonald	12.5	890	931	981	1,059	1,071	1,212	???
Conservative	Gregor Cameron	7.9	563	591	640	795	796		
Labour	Robin Cunningham	7.1	502	727	757	828	829	888	
Scottish Unionist	Mary Duckett	6.6	466	507	545				
Labour	Andy Carmichael	5.2	366	1,025	1,066	1,109	1,110	1,189	???
Liberal Democrats	Callan Dick	4.9	349	376					
Electorate: 14,934 Valid: 7,099 Quota: 1,420 Turnout: 48.7%

== By-elections ==
=== Cambuslang East ===
Cambuslang East councillor John Higgins died on 29 December 2007. A by-election, held on 6 March 2008, was won by Labour's Richard Tullett.

Cambuslang East by-election (6 March 2008) - 1 seat
Party	Candidate	FPv%	Count							
Party	Candidate	FPv%	1	2	3	4	5	6	7	8
Labour	Richard Tullett	28.0	725	729	739	742	747	922	1,094	1,475
SNP	Christine Deanie	23.5	609	614	621	625	638	728	962	
Liberal Democrats	Tunweer Malik	22.4	580	584	589	593	616	669		
Independent	John McGuinness	19.6	509	510	517	521	538			
Conservative	Malcolm Macaskill	3.1	80	82	82	94				
Scottish Unionist	Jimi Moore	1.5	38	39	40					
Scottish Socialist	David McClemont	1.2	32	35						
Scottish Green	Susan Martin	0.8	21							
Electorate: 10,397 Valid: 2,044 Spoilt: 38 Quota: 1,298 Turnout: 25.0%

=== East Kilbride West ===
Labour's Alan Scott won a by-election in East Kilbride West on 28 October 2010 to fill the vacancy which arose with the election of Michael McCann as an MP.

East Kilbride West by-election (28 October 2010) - 1 seat
Party	Candidate	FPv%	Count					
Party	Candidate	FPv%	1	2	3	4	5	6
Labour	Alan Scott	41.4	847	863	873	892	973	1,297
SNP	Pat McGuire	27.9	571	587	606	641	761	
Conservative	Ian Harrow	19.7	403	427	442	455		
Scottish Green	Raymond Burke	4.0	82	85	100			
East Kilbride Alliance	Brian Jones	3.5	71	76				
Liberal Democrats	Gordon Smith	3.4	70					
Electorate: 12,024 Valid: 2,044 Quota: 1,023 Turnout: 17.0%

=== Hamilton West and Earnock ===
The SNP's John Menzies won a by-election in Hamilton West and Earnock on 8 December 2011 to fill the vacancy which arose with the death of Independent Tommy Gilligan on 22 October 2011.

East Kilbride West by-election (22 October 2011) - 1 seat
Party	Candidate	FPv%	Count
Party	Candidate	FPv%	1
SNP	John Menzies	50.0	822
Labour	Stuart Gallacher	36.9	607
Conservative	Connar McBain	13.0	214
Electorate: 14,068 Valid: 1,643 Spoilt: 16 Quota: 822 Turnout: 11.8%
