= Ged Killen =

Scottish Labour Co-op politician

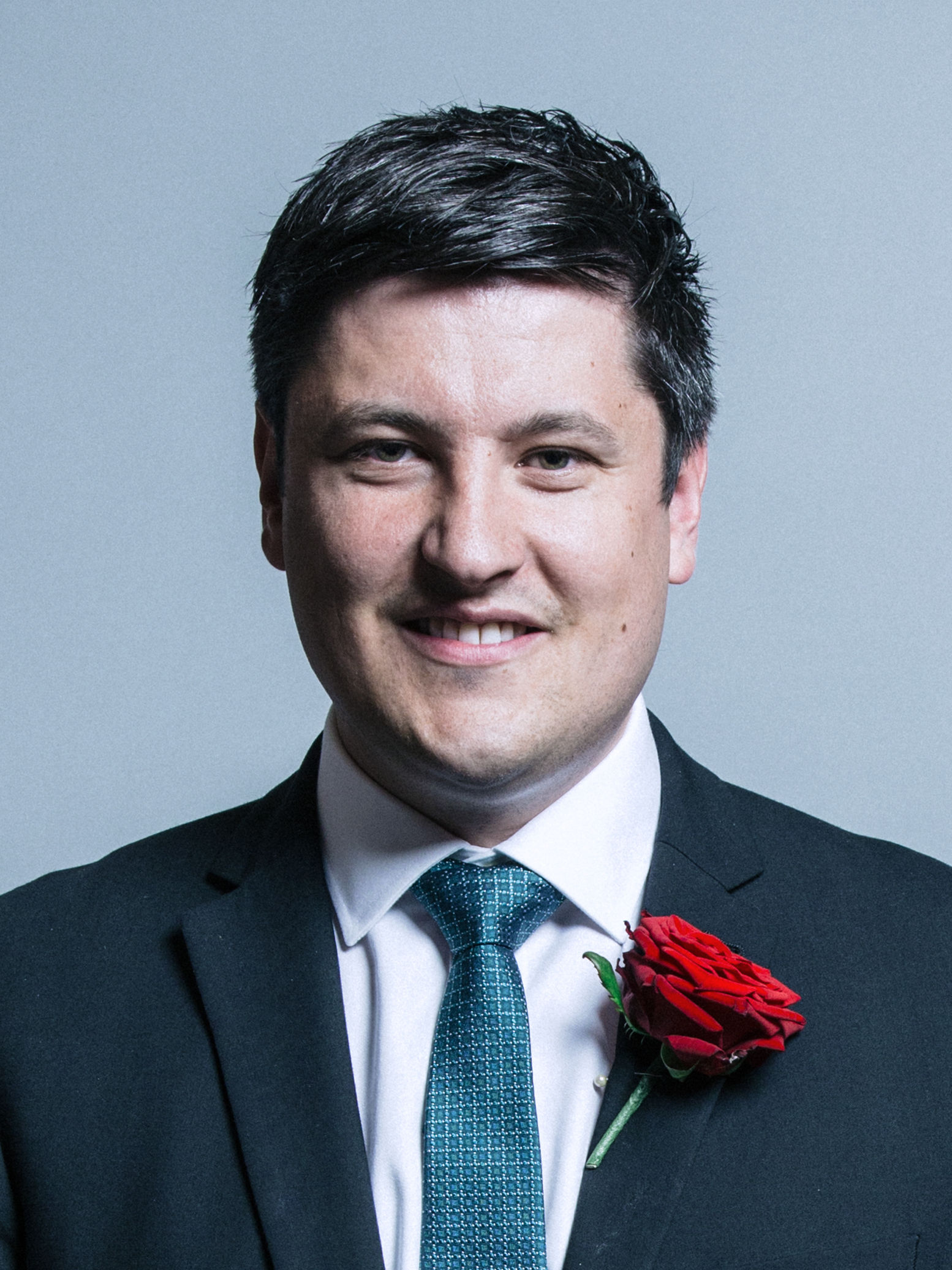
- Official portrait, 2017

Member of Parliament for Rutherglen and Hamilton West
- In office 8 June 2017 – 6 November 2019
- Preceded by: Margaret Ferrier
- Succeeded by: Margaret Ferrier

Member of South Lanarkshire Council
- In office 4 May 2017 – 23 June 2017
- Ward: Rutherglen Central and North
- Succeeded by: Martin Lennon (Note: Normally, multi-member wards do not have individual predecessors and successors. However, Killen resigned from his seat before his term expired and triggered a by-election.)
- In office 14 February 2013 – 4 May 2017
- Ward: Rutherglen South
- Preceded by: Anne Higgins (Note: Normally, multi-member wards do not have individual predecessors and successors. However, Higgins' death triggered a by-election won by Killen.)

Personal details
- Born: Gerard Killen; 1 May 1986 (age 40) Glasgow, Scotland
- Party: Labour Co-op
- Spouse: Peter Killen (m. 2013)
- Website: Official website

Gerard Killen (born 1 May 1986) is a Scottish Labour and Co-operative politician who served as Member of Parliament (MP) for Rutherglen and Hamilton West from 2017 to 2019.

== Early life ==
Killen was born in Glasgow, living in the Gorbals before moving to Blantyre where he spent most of his youth. He attended Trinity High School in Rutherglen.

== Political career ==
Killen joined the Labour Party in 2007 and first stood for public office as a candidate in the 2012 South Lanarkshire Council election.

Following the death of sitting SNP councillor Anne Higgins, Killen successfully contested the 2013 Rutherglen South ward by-election and was elected to South Lanarkshire Council aged 26. The by-election victory gave Labour an overall majority on the council. He was re-elected to the council at the 2017 local elections, this time in the Rutherglen Central and North ward.

Killen won the Rutherglen and Hamilton West at the 2017 general election, achieving a narrow majority of 265 votes over incumbent SNP MP Margaret Ferrier. He made his maiden speech on 27 June 2017.

During his tenure MP, Killen was an active campaigner for LGBT rights issues, men's mental health, and banking reform.

On 13 June 2018, Killen and five other Labour MPs resigned their roles as frontbenchers for the Labour Party in protest at Labour's position on Brexit. Labour Party leader Jeremy Corbyn had instructed his MPs to abstain in a vote which the UK would remain in the single market by joining the European Economic Area (EEA). The MPs resigned and voted in favour of the EEA.

At the 2019 general election, a swing of over 5% saw Ferrier regain Rutherglen and Hamilton West from Killen. Killen advocated for his party to back a second Scottish independence referendum after his election defeat, arguing a future referendum was inevitable, but maintained his support for remaining in a "more federal UK".

In September 2020, he called for Richard Leonard to resign as Leader of the Scottish Labour Party despite nominating him in the 2017 leadership election, saying he had since changed from supporting Leonard's leadership due to deep worries of grassroots members.

Killen supported Monica Lennon in the 2021 Scottish Labour leadership election after urging her to run early in the contest.

In anticipation of a by-election resulting from Margaret Ferrier's conduct in office, Killen was re-selected as Labour's prospective parliamentary candidate for Rutherglen and Hamilton West in January 2021. In May 2023, he was replaced as candidate by Michael Shanks.

== Personal life ==
Killen is gay, and married his husband Peter when they eloped in 2013. They hope to retire to Peter's hometown in Northern Ireland, which has influenced Killen's campaigning to equalise same-sex marriage laws between Northern Ireland and the rest of the UK. Killen is a Roman Catholic.

== Notes ==
Parliament of the United Kingdom
Preceded by Margaret Ferrier	Member of Parliament for Rutherglen and Hamilton West; 2017–2019	Succeeded by Margaret Ferrier
