= South Lanarkshire Council =

Unitary authority for South Lanarkshire, Scotland

South Lanarkshire Council Comhairle Lannraig a Deas
- Unitary Authority Council
- Coat of arms

- Council logo

Type
- Type: Unitary authority

History
- Founded: 1 April 1996

Leadership
- Provost: Bert Thomson, Labour since 26 August 2026
- Leader: Maureen Devlin, Labour since 27 May 2026
- Chief Executive: Paul Manning since 2023

Structure
- Seats: 64
- Graph of the party split among 64 seats.
- Political groups: Administration (28) Labour (24) Liberal Democrats (3) Independent (1) Other parties (36) SNP (26) Conservative (5) Reform (3) Green (1) Independent (1)

Elections
- Voting system: Single transferable vote
- Last election: 5 May 2022
- Next election: 6 May 2027

Meeting place
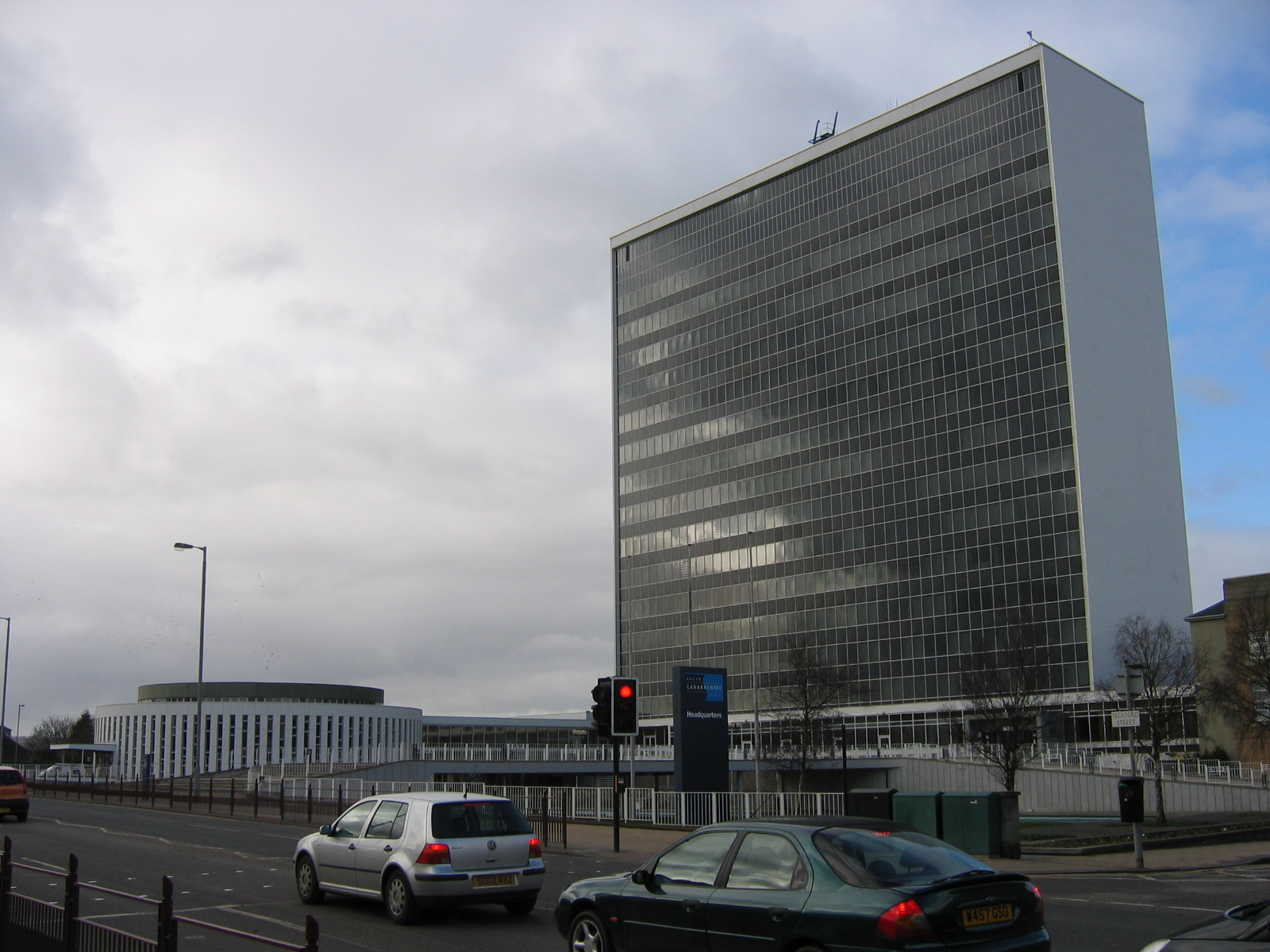
- Council Headquarters, Almada Street, Hamilton, ML3 0AA

Website
- www.southlanarkshire.gov.uk

South Lanarkshire Council (Scottish Gaelic: Comhairle Lannraig a Deas) is the local authority serving the South Lanarkshire council area in Scotland. The council is based at the Council Headquarters in Hamilton. It has been under no overall control since 2017, and has been Labour-led since 2022.

== History ==
South Lanarkshire and its council were created in 1996 under the Local Government (Scotland) Act 1994. The new area covered the abolished Clydesdale, Hamilton and East Kilbride districts, and some outer areas of Glasgow district (Rutherglen/Fernhill, Cambuslang/Halfway and part of King's Park/Toryglen); all were previously within the Strathclyde region from 1975 but in historic Lanarkshire prior to that.

== Political control ==
The council has been under no overall control since 2017. Following the 2022 election a Labour-led partnership with the Liberal Democrats and some of the independent councillors formed to run the council.

The first election to South Lanarkshire Council was held in 1995, initially operating as a shadow authority alongside the outgoing authorities until the new system came into force on 1 April 1996. Political control of the council since 1996 has been as follows:

Party in control	Years
Labour	1996–2007
No overall control	2007–2013
Labour	2013–2017
No overall control	2017–

=== Leadership ===
The role of provost is largely ceremonial in South Lanarkshire. They chair full council meetings and have an ambassadorial role as the council's civic figurehead. The provost is chosen from among the councillors and is expected to be politically impartial, although they are given an additional casting vote in the event of a tie. The provosts since 1996 have been:

- Sam Casserly (1995–1999) - previous provost of Hamilton district
- Alan Dick (1999–2003)
- Mushtaq Ahmad (2003–2007)
- Russell Clearie (2007–2012)
- Eileen Logan (2012–2017) - previous provost of Clydesdale district
- Ian McAllan (2017–2022)
- Margaret Cooper (2022–2026)
- Bert Thomson (2026–)

Political leadership is provided by the leader of the council, who chairs the council's executive committee. The first leader, Tom McCabe, was previously the leader of Hamilton District Council, one of the new council's predecessors. When McCabe was elected as an MSP in 1999, the role went to his deputy Eddie McAvoy - brother of one of the region's MPs Tommy McAvoy - who held the post for the next 18 years until his retirement at the 2017 election. The leaders of South Lanarkshire Council since 1996 have been:

Councillor	Party	From	To
Tom McCabe	Labour	1 Apr 1996	May 1999
Eddie McAvoy	Labour	May 1999	May 2017
John Ross	SNP	18 May 2017	May 2022
Joe Fagan	Labour	18 May 2022	May 2026
Maureen Devlin	Labour	27 May 2026	

=== Composition ===
Following the 2022 election and subsequent by-elections and changes of allegiance up to October 2026, the composition of the council was as follows:

Party	Seats
SNP	26
Labour	24
Conservative	5
Liberal Democrats	3
Reform	3
Green	1
Independent	2
Total	64

The next election is due in 2027.

== Elections ==
Since 2007 elections have been held every five years under the single transferable vote system, introduced by the Local Governance (Scotland) Act 2004. Election results since 1995 have been as follows:

Year	Seats	SNP	Labour	Conservative	Liberal Democrats	Green	Independent / Other	Notes
1995	73	8	61	2	2	0	0	Labour majority
1999	67	10	54	2	1	0	0	New ward boundaries. Labour majority
2003	67	10	50	2	2	0	3	Labour majority
2007	67	24	30	8	2	0	3	New ward boundaries.
2012	67	28	33	3	1	0	2	
2017	64	27	22	14	1	0	0	New ward boundaries.
2022	64	27	24	7	3	1	2	Labour / Lib Dem minority administration

== Premises ==
The Council Headquarters building, on Almada Street, Hamilton, was built in 1963 as the Lanark County Buildings, headquarters of Lanarkshire County Council. The building was designed by county architect David Gordon Bannerman. The 17 storey, 200 feet (61 m) tower is the tallest building in the council area, is Category A-listed, and is a highly visible landmark across this part of the Clyde Valley. The modernist design was influenced by the United Nations building in New York City. At the front of the building is the circular council chamber, and a plaza with water features. Between 1975 and 1996 the building had been used as a sub-regional office of Strathclyde Regional Council, with Hamilton District Council using Hamilton Townhouse in that time. On the creation of South Lanarkshire Council in 1996 the new council chose to base itself at the Almada Street building.

== Wards ==
In the council's initial 12 years, individual wards (73 in 1995, adjusted down to 67 in 1999 and 2003) each electing one councillor using the First past the post method.

Since the 2007 South Lanarkshire Council election, there are 20 council wards in South Lanarkshire, each serving a population ranging from 13,000 to 20,000 and each ward represented on the council by 3 or 4 councillors elected using single transferable vote; in 2007 and 2012 this produced a total of 67 available seats, which was adjusted down to 64 in 2017 along with boundary adjustments, although the same number of wards overall.

Map of South Lanarkshire's 20 wards, using 2017 boundaries

Number	Ward Name	Location	Seats (2017)	Population (2018)
1	Clydesdale West		4	19,124
2	Clydesdale North		3	14,777
3	Clydesdale East		3	13,065
4	Clydesdale South		3	14,647
5	Avondale and Stonehouse		3	17,089
6	East Kilbride South		3	16,688
7	East Kilbride Central South		3	16,177
8	East Kilbride Central North		3	16,799
9	East Kilbride West		3	13,695
10	East Kilbride East		3	14,308
11	Rutherglen South		3	15,448
12	Rutherglen Central and North		3	14,489
13	Cambuslang West		3	14,177
14	Cambuslang East		3	16,915
15	Blantyre		3	16,127
16	Bothwell and Uddingston		3	13,187
17	Hamilton North and East		3	15,036
18	Hamilton West and Earnock		4	18,618
19	Hamilton South		4	21,793
20	Larkhall		4	18,444
Total			64	320,530
