= Clydesdale (district) =

Scottish local government district (1975–1996), part of Strathclyde region

Coordinates: 55.700°N 3.833°W

Clydesdale Lanark (1975–1980)
- District
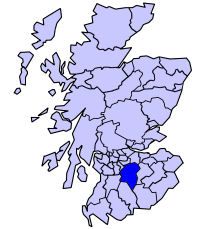
- Population
  - 1991: 57,588
- History
  - Created: 16 May 1975
  - Abolished: 31 March 1996
  - Succeeded by: (Part of) South Lanarkshire
- Status: District
  - HQ: Lanark

Clydesdale (pronounced /ˈklaɪdzdeɪl/; Dail Chluaidh in Scottish Gaelic, pronounced [t̪ʰal̪ˠ ˈxl̪ˠuəj]) was a local government district in the Strathclyde region of Scotland from 1975 to 1996. The district was called Lanark when created in 1975, but changed its name to Clydesdale in 1980. Clydesdale was an old name for the county of Lanarkshire, one of the historic counties of Scotland. Both the names Clydesdale and Strathclyde refer to the area's position in the valley (strath or dale) of the River Clyde.

== History ==
The district was created in 1975 under the Local Government (Scotland) Act 1973, which established a two-tier structure of local government across mainland Scotland comprising upper-tier regions and lower-tier districts. Lanark was one of nineteen districts created within the region of Strathclyde. The district covered the whole area of five former districts from the historic county of Lanarkshire:

- Biggar Burgh
- Lanark Burgh
- First District
- Second District
- Third District

The district was named "Lanark" after the area's main town. The council changed the name to "Clydesdale" in 1980.

The district was roughly conterminous to Lanarkshire's historic 'upper ward', being its southern part, the largest part in area but more rural and agricultural in character than the 'middle' and 'lower' wards which covered the densely populated industrial towns in and around the lower Clyde Valley and the city of Glasgow.

The district was abolished in 1996 under the Local Government etc. (Scotland) Act 1994 which replaced regions and districts with unitary council areas. South Lanarkshire council area was formed covering the districts of Clydesdale, East Kilbride, Hamilton, and parts of the City of Glasgow district.

The term Clydesdale continues to be used locally, usually in contexts comparing issues affecting the rural southern territory differently to the more urbanised north, or in names of organisations which focus on the area around Lanark. Four of the multi-member wards used by South Lanarkshire Council since 2007 use the name: Clydesdale East, Clydesdale North, Clydesdale South and Clydesdale West with a combined population of 61,613 in 2019; these roughly correspond to the Clydesdale constituency of the Scottish Parliament established in 1999.

== Political control ==
The first election to the district council was held in 1974, initially operating as a shadow authority alongside the outgoing authorities until it came into its powers on 16 May 1975. Political control of the council from 1975 was as follows:

Party in control	Years
No overall control	1975–1988
Labour	1988–1992
No overall control	1992–1996

== Premises ==
The council initially used various offices which had been inherited from its predecessor districts. By 1978 it had moved into the converted and extended former St Mary's Hospital buildings on South Vennel in Lanark, which had been built in the 1860s. Since the council's abolition the building has been an area office for South Lanarkshire Council.

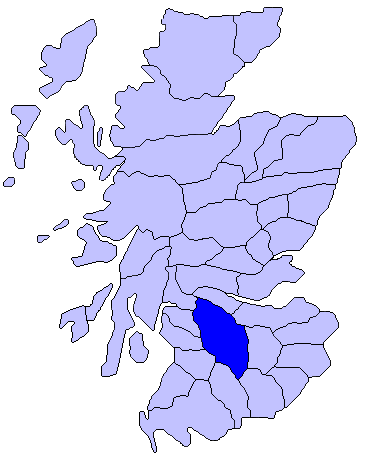
Map of Scotland showing the historic district of Clydesdale

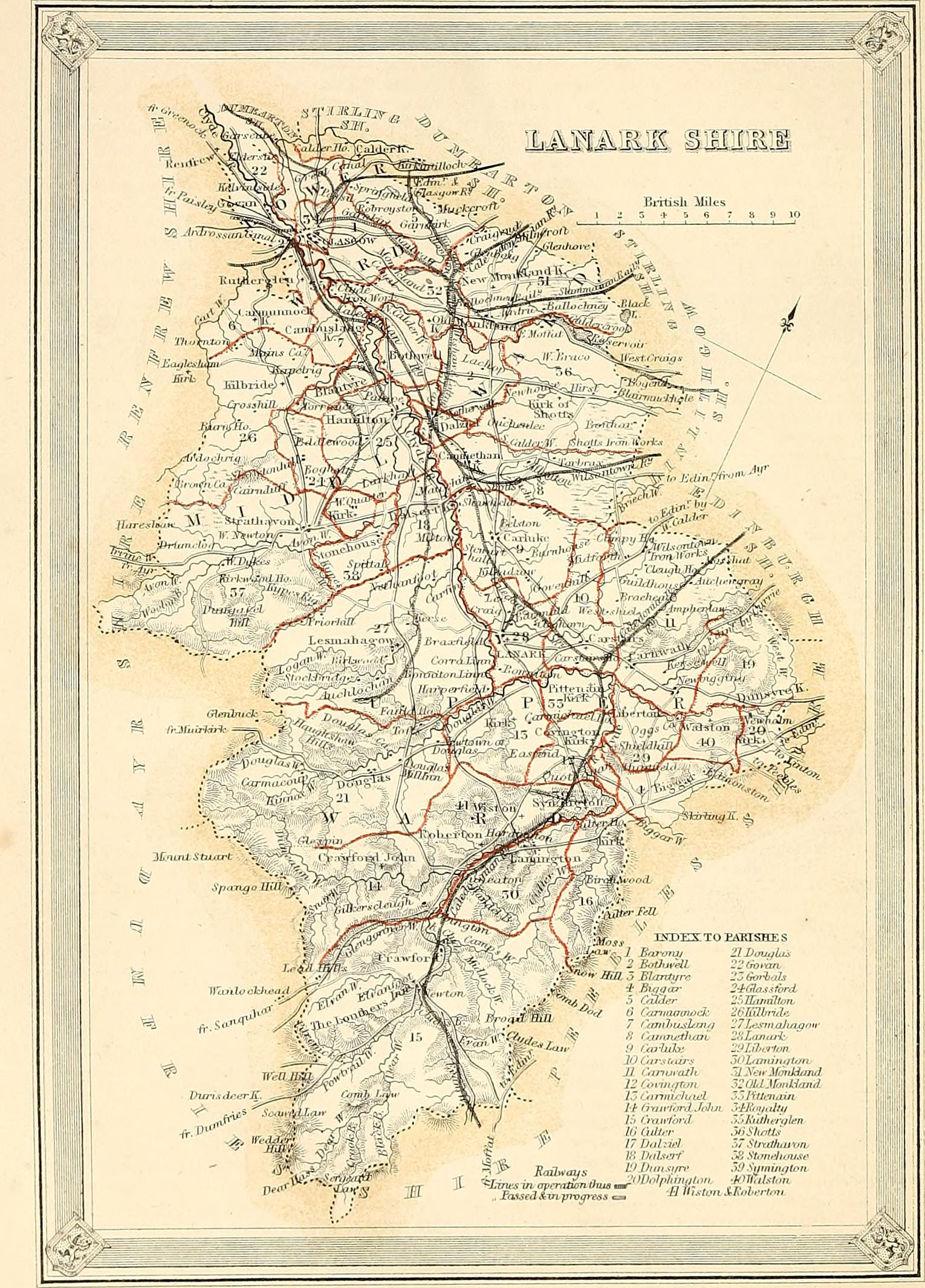
1868 map of Lanarkshire with its three 'wards' labelled, Clydesdale corresponding to the Upper Ward

== See also ==
- 1974 Clydesdale District Council election
- 1988 Clydesdale District Council election
- 1992 Clydesdale District Council election
- Subdivisions of Scotland
- Clydesdale horse
- Clydesdale Bank
- Clydesdale (UK Parliament constituency)
