= Rutherglen South (ward) =

Electoral ward in South Lanarkshire, Scotland

- South Lanarkshire
- Boundary of Rutherglen South in South Lanarkshire from 2007–2017.
- Population: 15,322 (2021)
- Electorate: 11,697 (2022)
- Major settlements: Rutherglen (part of)
- Scottish Parliament constituency: Rutherglen
- Scottish Parliament region: Glasgow
- UK Parliament constituency: Rutherglen

Current ward
- Created: 2007
- Number of councillors: 3
- Councillor: Carol Nugent (SNP)
- Councillor: Robert Brown (Liberal Democrats)
- Councillor: Margaret Cowie (Labour)
- Created from: Bankhead; Cathkin/Springhall; Fernhill; Spittal/Blairbeth; Stonelaw

Rutherglen South is one of the 20 electoral wards of South Lanarkshire Council. Created in 2007, the ward elects three councillors using the single transferable vote electoral system and covers an area with a population of 15,322 people.

The ward has politically been split between Labour, the Liberal Democrats and the Scottish National Party (SNP) with each party returning one councillor at each full election. Labour briefly held two of the three seats following a by-election in 2013.

== Boundaries ==
The ward was created following the Fourth Statutory Reviews of Electoral Arrangements ahead of the 2007 Scottish local elections. As a result of the Local Governance (Scotland) Act 2004, local elections in Scotland would use the single transferable vote electoral system from 2007 onwards so Rutherglen South was formed from an amalgamation of several previous first-past-the-post wards. It contained the majority of the former Stonelaw ward, roughly half of the former Cathkin/Springhall ward and all of the former Fernhill and Spittal/Blairbeth wards as well as a small part of the former Bankhead ward. Rutherglen South covers a suburban area in the south of Rutherglen including the neighbourhoods of Burnside, Blairbeth, Cathkin, Fernhill, High Burnside, Springhall and Spittal. The ward's western boundary is the long-established division with Glasgow City Council.

Prior to the local government reforms in the 1990s, Rutherglen was within the Glasgow District under Strathclyde Regional Council. One of its single-member wards was Fernhill, which included much of the same area as the current Rutherglen South, with the exception of the parts of Burnside north of the Cathcart Circle Line railway tracks.

Following the Fifth Statutory Reviews of Electoral Arrangements ahead of the 2017 Scottish local elections, streets around Overtoun Park, Dryburgh Avenue and Limeside Avenue were transferred from the ward into Rutherglen Central and North while streets to the east of the ward around East Kilbride Road, Brownside Road and Dukes Road were transferred into Rutherglen South from Cambuslang West.

== Councillors ==
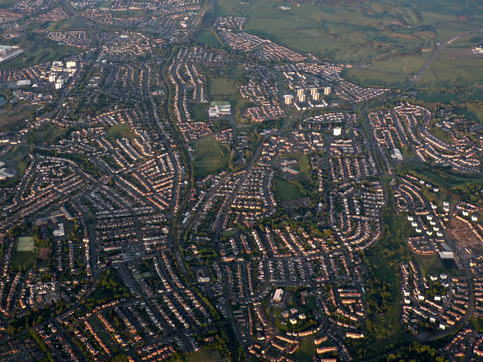
Aerial view of the ward from the west

Election	Councillors		
2007	Brian McKenna (Labour)	Eileen Baxendale (Liberal Democrats)	Anne Higgins (SNP)
2012	Brian McKenna (Labour)	Robert Brown (Liberal Democrats)	Anne Higgins (SNP)
2013 by-election	Brian McKenna (Labour)	Robert Brown (Liberal Democrats)	Gerard Killen (Labour)
2017	Margaret Cowie (Labour)	Robert Brown (Liberal Democrats)	Carol Nugent (SNP)
2022	Margaret Cowie (Labour)	Robert Brown (Liberal Democrats)	Carol Nugent (SNP)

== Election results ==
=== 2022 election ===
Rutherglen South - 3 seats
Party	Candidate	FPv%	Count	
Party	Candidate	FPv%	1	2
SNP	Carol Nugent (incumbent)	31.9	1,825	
Liberal Democrats	Robert Brown (incumbent)	29.4	1,686	
Labour	Margaret Cowie (incumbent)	23.2	1,331	1,436
Conservative	Alexandra Herdman	8.5	489	495
Green	Emma Smith	4.6	263	436
Scottish Family	Michael O'Hara	1.3	73	85
Independent	Spencer Hugh Pryor	1.1	62	73
Electorate: 11,697 Valid: 5,729 Spoilt: 73 Quota: 1,433 Turnout: 49.6%

=== 2017 election ===
Rutherglen South - 3 seats
Party	Candidate	FPv%	Count				
Party	Candidate	FPv%	1	2	3	4	5
SNP	Carol Nugent	31.0	1,803				
Liberal Democrats	Robert Brown (incumbent)	31.0	1,798				
Labour	Margaret Cowie	19.7	1,142	1,220	1,333	1,343	1,522
Conservative	Taylor Muir	14.7	854	861	950	976	1,009
Green	Brian Finlay	2.6	152	324	364	383	
UKIP	Jack Sinclair	1.0	57	65	71		
Electorate: 11,557 Valid: 5,806 Spoilt: 65 Quota: 1,452 Turnout: 50.8%

=== 2013 by-election ===
Rutherglen South by-election (14 February 2013) - 1 seat
Party	Candidate	FPv%	Count						
Party	Candidate	FPv%	1	2	3	4	5	6	7
Labour	Gerard Killen	39.9	1,352	1,358	1,370	1,376	1,396	1,616	2,090
Liberal Democrats	David Baillie	29.5	999	1,004	1,016	1,035	1,104	1,278	
SNP	Margaret Ferrier	21.0	712	714	730	741	755		
Conservative	Aric Gilinisky	3.8	128	133	134	170			
UKIP	Donald Murdo MacKay	3.3	111	115	120				
Green	Susan Martin	1.7	59	60					
Independent	Craig Smith	0.9	31						
Electorate: 12,919 Valid: 3,392 Spoilt: 46 Quota: 1,697 Turnout: 26.6%

=== 2012 election ===
Rutherglen South - 3 seats
Party	Candidate	FPv%	Count				
Party	Candidate	FPv%	1	2	3	4	5
Labour	Brian McKenna (incumbent)	26.0	1,244				
Liberal Democrats	Robert Brown	24.7	1,181	1,185	1,213		
SNP	Anne Higgins (incumbent) (Note: Rutherglen South SNP councillor Anne Higgins died on 20 November 2012. A by-election was held on 14 February 2013 and was won by Labour's Gerard Killen which gave the party an overall majority on the council.)	23.9	1,141	1,143	1,151	1,156	1,199
Labour	Gerard Killen	17.8	851	888	914	918	972
Conservative	Richard Tawse	4.9	232	233	269	272	
Scottish Unionist	Michael Haigh	2.7	130	131			
Electorate: 11,153 Valid: 4,779 Spoilt: 72 Quota: 1,195 Turnout: 42.9%

=== 2007 election ===
Rutherglen South - 3 seats
Party	Candidate	FPv%	Count									
Party	Candidate	FPv%	1	2	3	4	5	6	7	8	9	10
Labour	Brian McKenna (Note: Returning councillor for Burgh single-member ward.)	24.7	1,534	1,548	1,565							
Liberal Democrats	Eileen Baxendale	17.3	1,077	1,082	1,092	1,092	???	1,174	1,597			
SNP	Anne Higgins	16.8	1,045	1,070	1,074	1,074	???	1,159	1,195	1,204	1,303	???
Labour	Patricia Osborne (Note: Returning councillor for Fernhill single-member ward.)	13.6	846	857	864	871	???	951	970	976	1,035	
Conservative	Jean Miller	8.5	529	530	588	588	???	630	649	657		
Liberal Democrats	Danny Campbell	8.1	506	507	510	510	???	550				
Independent	Brian McCutcheon	4.6	285	293	303	303	???					
Green	Michael Tobin	2.4	150	176	178	178						
Scottish Unionist	Michael A Haigh	2.2	135	138								
Scottish Socialist	John Patrick	1.7	106									
Electorate: 11,376 Valid: 6,213 Quota: 1,554 Turnout: 55.8%
