= Rutherglen Central and North (ward) =

Electoral ward in Scotland

- South Lanarkshire
- Boundary of Rutherglen Central and North in South Lanarkshire from 2007–2017.
- Population: 14,237 (2021)
- Electorate: 11,692 (2022)
- Major settlements: Rutherglen (part of)
- Scottish Parliament constituency: Rutherglen
- Scottish Parliament region: Glasgow
- UK Parliament constituency: Rutherglen

Current ward
- Created: 2007
- Number of councillors: 3
- Councillor: Martin Lennon (Labour)
- Councillor: Janine Calikes (SNP)
- Councillor: Andrea Cowan (SNP)
- Created from: Bankhead; Burgh; Rutherglen West; Stonelaw

Rutherglen Central and North is one of the 20 electoral wards of South Lanarkshire Council. Created in 2007, the ward elects three councillors using the single transferable vote electoral system and covers an area with a population of 14,237 people.

The ward was previously a Labour stronghold with the party holding two of the three seats from 2007 to 2017 however, the ward has since swung to the Scottish National Party (SNP) who won two of the three seats at the 2022 election.

== Boundaries ==
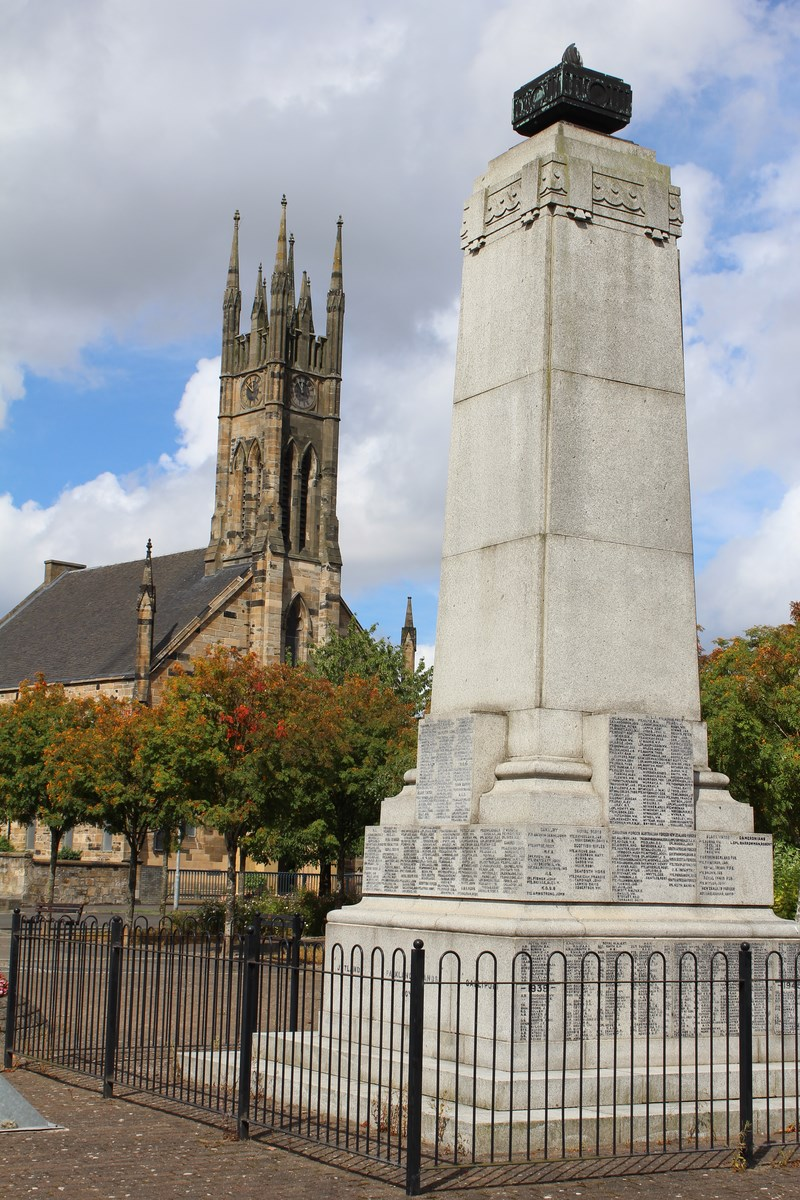
Rutherglen West Parish Church and the town's war memorial are among the landmarks in the ward

The ward was created following the Fourth Statutory Reviews of Electoral Arrangements ahead of the 2007 Scottish local elections. As a result of the Local Governance (Scotland) Act 2004, local elections in Scotland would use the single transferable vote electoral system from 2007 onwards so Rutherglen Central and North was formed from an amalgamation of several previous first-past-the-post wards. It contained the vast majority of the former Bankhead ward, all of the former Burgh and Rutherglen West wards as well as a small part of the former Stonelaw ward. Rutherglen North covers a suburban area in the north of Rutherglen – the northernmost part of South Lanarkshire – including the neighbourhoods of Burgh, Bankhead, Burnhill, Gallowflat and Farme Cross as well as the unpopulated Shawfield industrial area. The ward's northern and western boundary is the long-established division with Glasgow City Council, part of which runs along the River Clyde.

Prior to the local government reforms in the 1990s, Rutherglen was within the Glasgow District under Strathclyde Regional Council. One of its single-member wards was Rutherglen, which included much of the same area as the current Rutherglen Central and North, with the exception of the Burnhill and Newfield neighbourhoods and the addition of the parts of Burnside north of the Cathcart Circle Line railway tracks.

Following the Fifth Statutory Reviews of Electoral Arrangements ahead of the 2017 Scottish local elections, streets around Overtoun Park, Dryburgh Avenue and Limeside Avenue were transferred into the ward from Rutherglen South.

== Councillors ==
Election	Councillors		
2007	Edward McAvoy (Labour)	Denis McKenna (Labour)	Gordon Clark (SNP)
2012	Edward McAvoy (Labour)	Denis McKenna (Labour)	Gordon Clark (SNP)
2017	Gerard Killen (Labour)	Jared Wark (Conservative)	Janine Calikes (SNP)
2017 by-election	Martin Lennon (Labour)	Jared Wark (Conservative)	Janine Calikes (SNP)
2022	Martin Lennon (Labour)	Andrea Cowan (SNP)	Janine Calikes (SNP)

== Election results ==
=== 2022 election ===
Rutherglen Central and North - 3 seats
Party	Candidate	FPv%	Count					
Party	Candidate	FPv%	1	2	3	4	5	6
Labour	Martin Lennon (incumbent)	24.5	1,245	1,270				
SNP	Janine Calikes (incumbent)	23.4	1,188	1,265	1,338			
SNP	Andrea Cowan	14.3	725	796	840	899	1,029	1,163
Conservative	Libby Fox	12.0	609	612	730	730	881	
Labour	Jack McGinty	10.5	531	567	716	717		
Liberal Democrats	Gloria Adebo	10.2	517	544				
Green	Alex McRae	5.1	261					
Electorate: 11,692 Valid: 5,076 Spoilt: 151 Quota: 1,270 Turnout: 44.7%

=== 2017 by-election ===
Rutherglen Central and North by-election (23 November 2017) - 1 seat
Party	Candidate	FPv%	Count				
Party	Candidate	FPv%	1	2	3	4	5
Labour	Martin Lennon	38.5	1,173	1,176	1,203	1,270	1,541
SNP	David Innes	27.4	836	838	870	884	989
Liberal Democrats	Ellen Bryson	18.2	554	558	574	711	
Conservative	Taylor Muir	12.1	368	377	379		
Green	Brian Finlay	2.9	88	93			
UKIP	Janice MacKay	0.9	28				
Electorate: 12,110 Valid: 3,047 Spoilt: 47 Quota: 1,524 Turnout: 25.5%

=== 2017 election ===
Rutherglen Central and North - 3 seats
Party	Candidate	FPv%	Count						
Party	Candidate	FPv%	1	2	3	4	5	6	7
SNP	Janine Calikes	29.0	1,492						
Labour	Gerard Killen (incumbent) (Note: On 23 June 2017, Rutherglen Central and North Labour councillor Gerard Killen resigned his seat having been elected as MP for Rutherglen and Hamilton West. A by-election was held on 23 November 2017.)	25.5	1,313						
Conservative	Jared Wark	16.2	835	836	836	847	876	1,083	1,338
SNP	Gordon Clark (incumbent)	10.5	538	719	720	828	881	968	
Liberal Democrats	Liz Keenan	9.3	478	482	483	524	603		
Labour	Martin Lennon	5.4	279	282	304	330			
Green	Raymond Burke	4.0	206	217	217				
Electorate: 11,849 Valid: 5,141 Spoilt: 144 Quota: 1,286 Turnout: 44.6%

=== 2012 election ===
Rutherglen Central and North - 3 seats
Party	Candidate	FPv%	Count		
Party	Candidate	FPv%	1	2	3
Labour	Edward McAvoy (incumbent)	40.8	1,571		
SNP	Gordon Clark (incumbent)	23.4	902	928	974
Labour	Denis McKenna (incumbent)	20.2	777	1,300	
Conservative	Jean Miller	5.2	200	205	219
SNP	Michael Hanley	4.1	158	163	176
Scottish Unionist	Jim Nixon	3.8	148	152	166
Liberal Democrats	Tunweer Malik	2.5	97	104	128
Electorate: 10,280 Valid: 3,853 Spoilt: 113 Quota: 964 Turnout: 37.5%

=== 2007 election ===
Rutherglen Central and North - 3 seats
Party	Candidate	FPv%	Count							
Party	Candidate	FPv%	1	2	3	4	5	6	7	8
Labour	Eddie McAvoy (Note: Returning councillor for Bankhead single-member ward.)	35.1	1,833							
SNP	Gordon Clark	22.9	1,198	1,233	1,273	1,286	1,355			
Labour	Denis McKenna (Note: Returning councillor for Rutherglen West single-member ward.)	15.0	786	1,162	1,180	1,191	1,221	???	???	???
Liberal Democrats	Janette Little	12.7	666	692	702	721	781	???	???	
Conservative	Ian Raeburn	5.4	283	288	291	371	376	???		
Green	Susan Martin	3.4	176	182	210	216				
Scottish Unionist	Jim Nixon	3.0	157	159	162					
Scottish Socialist	John Starrs	2.4	126	129						
Electorate: 10,867 Valid: 5,225 Quota: 1,307 Turnout: 49.1%
