= Michael McCann (politician) =

British politician (born 1964)

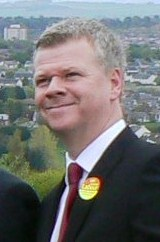
- McCann in 2010

Member of Parliament for East Kilbride, Strathaven and Lesmahagow
- In office 6 May 2010 – 30 March 2015
- Preceded by: Adam Ingram
- Succeeded by: Lisa Cameron

Personal details
- Born: 2 January 1964 (age 62) Glasgow, Lanarkshire, Scotland
- Party: Labour (until 2019)
- Spouse: Tracey Anne McCann

Michael McCann (born 2 January 1964) is a British politician who was the Member of Parliament (MP) for East Kilbride, Strathaven and Lesmahagow 2010–2015. He was formerly a councillor in South Lanarkshire, serving on the planning and estates committees.

He was formerly a member of the Labour Party before leaving the party in 2019.

== Political career ==
McCann was elected as a councillor in South Lanarkshire in 2003 and 2007.

He was elected to the UK Parliament in 2010 as the MP for the East Kilbride, Strathaven and Lesmahagow seat, succeeding Adam Ingram. McCann was chairman of the Scottish Parliamentary Labour Party. He served on the International Development Committee in the 2010–2015 Parliament and was a member of Labour Friends of Israel.

McCann is known to be a fierce critic of the Scottish National Party, and ruled out any formal post-election deal with them in March 2015. He lost the seat in the subsequent general election to the SNP's Lisa Cameron, one of the landslide 56 SNP MPs returned on 7 May 2015.

At the 2019 general election, McCann backed Epsom and Ewell MP Chris Grayling, Boris Johnson and the Conservative Party, saying "a vote for anyone else is a vote for Jeremy Corbyn - and a Corbyn government would be disastrous for Britain."

Parliament of the United Kingdom
Preceded by Adam Ingram	Member of Parliament for East Kilbride, Strathaven & Lesmahagow; 2010– 2015	Succeeded by Lisa Cameron
