= East Kilbride Central North (ward) =

Electoral ward in South Lanarkshire, Scotland

- South Lanarkshire
- Boundary of East Kilbride Central North in South Lanarkshire from 2007–2017.
- Population: 16,547 (2021)
- Electorate: 12,861 (2022)
- Major settlements: East Kilbride (part of)
- Scottish Parliament constituency: East Kilbride
- Scottish Parliament region: Central Scotland
- UK Parliament constituency: East Kilbride and Strathaven

Current ward
- Created: 2007
- Number of councillors: 3
- Councillor: Grant Ferguson (SNP)
- Councillor: Joe Fagan (Labour)
- Councillor: Hugh McDonald (SNP)
- Created from: Blacklaw; Calderglen; East Mains; Heatheryknowe; Maxwellton; West Mains

East Kilbride Central North is one of the 20 electoral wards of South Lanarkshire Council. Created in 2007, the ward initially elected four councillors using the single transferable vote electoral system and covers an area with a population of 16,547 people. Following a boundary review, the ward has elected three councillors since 2017.

The ward has produced strong results for both Labour and the Scottish National Party (SNP) with the parties initially sharing the seats evenly. However, since 2017, the ward has become an SNP stronghold with the party holding two of the three seats.

Following the 2022 election, the ward has been the seat of the leader of South Lanarkshire Council, Cllr Joe Fagan.

== Boundaries ==
The ward was created following the Fourth Statutory Reviews of Electoral Arrangements ahead of the 2007 Scottish local elections. As a result of the Local Governance (Scotland) Act 2004, local elections in Scotland would use the single transferable vote electoral system from 2007 onwards so East Kilbride Central North was formed from an amalgamation of several previous first-past-the-post wards. It contained the majority of the former East Mains and West Mains wards as well as part of the former Heatheryknowe and Calderglen wards and all of the former Blacklaw and Maxwellton wards. As the name suggests, East Kilbride Central North covers the parts of East Kilbride just north of the town centre with the southern boundary being the Queensway (A726) dual carriageway, including the central retail and administrative area itself as well as the neighbourhoods of East Mains, Kirktonholme, the Village and West Mains, most of St Leonards (west of High Common Road) and part of Calderwood (Maxwellton/west of Calderwood Road). Following the Fifth Statutory Reviews of Electoral Arrangements ahead of the 2017 Scottish local elections, a few streets in the east of the ward between Calderwood Road, Morrishall Road and Hunter Primary School were transferred to the East Kilbride East ward. Although this only had a small effect on the electorate, it caused the loss of one seat from the original four to balance with other wards with similar populations.

== Councillors ==
| Election | Councillors | | | |
|---|---|---|---|---|
| 2007 | Alice Marie Mitchell (Labour) | Sheena Wardhaugh (SNP) | Anne Maggs (SNP) | Christopher Thompson (Labour) |
| 2012 | Alice Marie Mitchell (Labour) | Sheena Wardhaugh (SNP) | Anne Maggs (SNP) | Christopher Thompson (Labour) |
| 2017 | Joe Fagan (Labour) | Sheena Wardhaugh (SNP) | Hugh MacDonald (SNP) | |
| 2019 by-election | Joe Fagan (Labour) | Grant Ferguson (SNP) | Hugh MacDonald (SNP) | |
| 2022 | Joe Fagan (Labour) | Grant Ferguson (SNP) | Hugh MacDonald (SNP) | |

== Election results ==
=== 2022 election ===
East Kilbride Central North - 3 seats
| Party | Candidate | FPv% | Count | | | | | | |
| Party | Candidate | FPv% | 1 | 2 | 3 | 4 | 5 | 6 | 7 |
|---|---|---|---|---|---|---|---|---|---|
| SNP | Grant Ferguson (incumbent) | 33.1 | 1,889 | | | | | | |
| Labour | Joe Fagan (incumbent) | 30.0 | 1,709 | | | | | | |
| Conservative | Alex Brown | 12.2 | 694 | 695 | 711 | 746 | 769 | 914 | |
| SNP | Hugh MacDonald (incumbent) | 10.7 | 612 | 1,027 | 1,044 | 1,068 | 1,140 | 1,254 | 1,386 |
| Labour | Tam Mitchell | 7.4 | 420 | 427 | 632 | 692 | 749 | | |
| Independent | Kristofer Keane | 3.4 | 194 | 202 | 210 | 249 | | | |
| Liberal Democrats | Tom Bryson | 3.3 | 187 | 196 | 209 | | | | |
Electorate: 12,861 Valid: 5,705 Spoilt: 154 Quota: 1,427 Turnout: 45.6%

=== 2019 by-election ===
East Kilbride Central North by-election (29 August 2019) - 1 seat
| Party | Candidate | FPv% | Count | | | | |
| Party | Candidate | FPv% | 1 | 2 | 3 | 4 | 5 |
|---|---|---|---|---|---|---|---|
| SNP | Grant Ferguson | 46.5 | 1,582 | 1,582 | 1,588 | 1,650 | 1,743 |
| Labour | Kirsty Williams | 20.3 | 690 | 692 | 695 | 715 | 837 |
| Conservative | Graham Fisher | 14.6 | 498 | 499 | 513 | 519 | 606 |
| Liberal Democrats | Paul McGarry | 12.4 | 422 | 424 | 428 | 456 | |
| Green | Antony Lee | 4.5 | 153 | 154 | 159 | | |
| UKIP | David MacKay | 1.4 | 48 | 50 | | | |
| Scottish Libertarian | Stephen McNamara | 0.4 | 12 | | | | |
Electorate: 12,960 Valid: 3,405 Spoilt: 51 Quota: 1,703 Turnout: 26.7%

=== 2017 election ===
East Kilbride Central North - 3 seats
| Party | Candidate | FPv% | Count | | | | | | |
| Party | Candidate | FPv% | 1 | 2 | 3 | 4 | 5 | 6 | 7 |
|---|---|---|---|---|---|---|---|---|---|
| SNP | Hugh MacDonald | 22.2 | 1,374 | 1,389 | 1,398 | 1,452 | 1,488 | 1,519 | 1,618 |
| SNP | Sheena Wardhaugh (incumbent) (Note: East Kilbride Central North SNP councillor Sheena Wardhaugh resigned from the party and became an independent on 25 May 2017. On 2 June 2019, Sheena Wardhaugh died and a by-election was held on 29 August.) | 20.1 | 1,243 | 1,249 | 1,261 | 1,351 | 1,390 | 1,420 | 1,482 |
| Labour | Joe Fagan | 18.8 | 1,163 | 1,173 | 1,198 | 1,229 | 1,873 | | |
| Conservative | Darren Clyde | 18.8 | 1,163 | 1,165 | 1,188 | 1,209 | 1,258 | 1,319 | |
| Labour | Alice Marie Mitchell (incumbent) | 12.8 | 795 | 799 | 827 | 854 | | | |
| Green | James Thornbury | 3.9 | 239 | 254 | 294 | | | | |
| Liberal Democrats | John Rintoul | 2.5 | 153 | 157 | | | | | |
| Solidarity | Stuart McLean | 1.1 | 69 | | | | | | |
Electorate: 13,113 Valid: 6,199 Spoilt: 174 Quota: 1,550 Turnout: 48.6%

=== 2012 election ===
East Kilbride Central North - 4 seats
| Party | Candidate | FPv% | Count | | | | | | | |
| Party | Candidate | FPv% | 1 | 2 | 3 | 4 | 5 | 6 | 7 | 8 |
|---|---|---|---|---|---|---|---|---|---|---|
| SNP | Anne Maggs (incumbent) | 29.3 | 1,733 | | | | | | | |
| Labour | Alice Marie Mitchell (incumbent) | 22.8 | 1,348 | | | | | | | |
| Labour | Christopher Thompson (incumbent) | 18.0 | 1,065 | 1,101 | 1,231 | | | | | |
| SNP | Sheena Wardhaugh (incumbent) | 9.3 | 549 | 973 | 978 | 984 | 994 | 1,065 | 1,115 | 1,374 |
| Green | Kirsten Robb | 8.7 | 516 | 561 | 571 | 580 | 599 | 715 | 820 | |
| Conservative | William Chalmers | 6.3 | 374 | 378 | 381 | 383 | 386 | 412 | | |
| East Kilbride Alliance | Clare Keane | 4.7 | 277 | 287 | 291 | 293 | 303 | | | |
| Solidarity | Richard Foster | 0.9 | 51 | 53 | 54 | 55 | | | | |
Electorate: 14,005 Valid: 5,913 Spoilt: 104 Quota: 1,183 Turnout: 42.2%

=== 2007 election ===
East Kilbride Central North - 4 seats
| Party | Candidate | FPv% | Count | | | | | | | | | |
| Party | Candidate | FPv% | 1 | 2 | 3 | 4 | 5 | 6 | 7 | 8 | 9 | 10 |
|---|---|---|---|---|---|---|---|---|---|---|---|---|
| SNP | Anne Maggs (Note: Returning councillor for Blacklaw single-member ward.) | 28.3 | 2,248 | | | | | | | | | |
| Labour | Alice Mitchell (Note: Returning councillor for East Mains single-member ward.) | 23.9 | 1,899 | | | | | | | | | |
| Labour | Christopher Thompson (Note: Returning councillor for Maxwellton single-member ward.) | 15.5 | 1,229 | 1,269 | 1,456 | 1,477 | 1,482 | 1,513 | 1,617 | | | |
| Conservative | Isobel Perratt | 6.9 | 545 | 563 | 571 | 575 | 584 | 618 | 679 | 681 | | |
| SNP | Sheena Wardhaugh | 6.8 | 538 | 927 | 937 | 969 | 982 | 1,059 | 1,149 | 1,154 | 1,264 | ??? |
| Green | Raymond Burke | 6.3 | 500 | 542 | 555 | 594 | 610 | 690 | 817 | 821 | 963 | |
| Liberal Democrats | Gordon Smith | 5.6 | 446 | 480 | 499 | 520 | 524 | 570 | | | | |
| East Kilbride Alliance | Clare Keane | 2.9 | 227 | 242 | 250 | 259 | 383 | | | | | |
| East Kilbride Alliance | Tim Gingell | 2.1 | 169 | 179 | 183 | 185 | | | | | | |
| Scottish Socialist | Catherine Pedersen | 1.6 | 130 | 149 | 154 | | | | | | | |
Electorate: 14,310 Valid: 7,931 Quota: 1,587 Turnout: 57.0%
