= 2003 South Lanarkshire Council election =

South Lanarkshire Council election

← 1999	1 May 2003	2007 →

All 67 seats to South Lanarkshire Council 34 seats needed for a majority
- Registered: 232,466
- Turnout: 49.4%
	First party	Second party
	Lab	SNP
Leader	Edward McAvoy
Party	Labour	SNP
Last election	54 seats, 50.1%	10 seats, 33.1%
Seats won	51	9
Seat change	▼3	▼1
Popular vote	55,173	33,555
Percentage	48.0%	29.2%
Swing	▼2.0%	▼3.8%
	Third party	Fourth party
	Ind	Con
Party	Independent	Conservative
Last election	0 seats, 0.6%	2 seat, 10.3%
Seats won	3	2
Seat change	▲3	Steady
Popular vote	3,604	14,371
Percentage	3.1%	12.5%
Swing	▲2.5%	▲2.3%
	Fifth party
	LD
Party	Liberal Democrats
Last election	1 seat, 5.7%
Seats won	2
Seat change	▲1
Popular vote	5,336
Percentage	4.6%
Swing	▼1.0%
- Results by ward.
Council Leader before election
Edward McAvoy
Labour
Council Leader after election
Edward McAvoy
Labour

Elections to South Lanarkshire Council were held on 1 May 2003, the same day as the 31 other local government elections in Scotland and elections to the Scottish Parliament. This was the third election since the council's creation in 1995 and the last election to use first-past-the-post voting.

Labour maintained control of the council although their vote share reduced to 48.0%. The party won a majority of the seats despite their representation on the council decreasing by three. The Scottish National Party (SNP) remained as the largest opposition party on the council despite a net loss of one seat. The Conservatives remained on two seats while the Liberal Democrats gained one seat to hold two and three independent candidates were elected.

Following the introduction of the Local Governance (Scotland) Act 2004, local elections in Scotland would use the single transferable vote electoral system which meant this was the last election in which the 67 single-member wards created by the Third Statutory Reviews of Electoral Arrangements would be contested.

== Results ==
2003 South Lanarkshire Council election result
Party	Seats	Gains	Losses	Net gain/loss	Seats %	Votes %	Votes	+/−
Labour	51	2	5	▼3	77.6	48.0	55,173	▼2.0
SNP	9	1	2	▼1	10.4	29.2	33,555	▼3.8
Independent	3	3	0	▲3	4.5	3.1	3,604	▲2.5
Conservative	2	0	0	Steady	4.5	12.5	14,371	▲2.3
Liberal Democrats	2	1	0	▲1	3.0	4.6	5,336	▼1.0
Scottish Socialist	0	0	0	Steady	0.0	2.3	2,589	New
Scottish Unionist	0	0	0	Steady	0.0	0.2	255	New
Total	67						114,883	

== Ward results ==
=== Lanark North ===
Lanark North
Party	Candidate	Votes	%	±%
Labour	Mary McNeill	761	40.7	▲2.8
Conservative	Alistair Campbell	636	34.0	▲2.5
SNP	Carolyn Park	349	18.7	▼3.3
Liberal Democrats	Ronald Waddell	124	6.6	▼2.0
Majority		125	6.7	▲0.3
Turnout		1,870	52.1	▼10.2
Registered electors		3,591		
Labour hold		Swing	▲0.1	

=== Lanark South ===
Lanark South
Party	Candidate	Votes	%	±%
Labour	Brian Reilly	802	46.2	▲5.0
SNP	Frank Gunning	550	31.7	▲0.3
Conservative	Patrick Ross-Taylor	384	22.1	▲4.5
Majority		252	14.5	▲4.7
Turnout		1,736	50.7	▼7.3
Registered electors		3,427		
Labour hold		Swing	▲2.3	

=== Lesmahagow ===
Lesmahagow
Party	Candidate	Votes	%	±%
Labour	Alexander McInnes	1,010	55.8	▼15.3
SNP	David Smart	684	37.8	▲8.9
Conservative	Grace Parton	116	6.4	New
Majority		326	18.0	▼24.2
Turnout		1,810	53.0	▼8.0
Registered electors		3,418		
Labour hold		Swing	▼12.1	

=== Blackwood ===
Blackwood
Party	Candidate	Votes	%	±%
SNP	Archibald Manson	910	53.9	▼6.5
Labour	Esther Serrels	662	39.2	▼1.3
Conservative	Louise Hodgson	116	6.9	New
Majority		248	14.7	▼4.2
Turnout		1,688	54.7	▼8.7
Registered electors		3,086		
SNP hold		Swing	▲2.6	

=== Clyde Valley ===
Clyde Valley
Party	Candidate	Votes	%	±%
Labour	Elizabeth Rush	521	33.4	▼1.8
SNP	Thomas Ashburn	515	33.0	▼4.0
Conservative	Alex Allison	329	21.1	▲4.9
Liberal Democrats	David Hill	195	12.5	▲1.0
Majority		4	0.4	N/A
Turnout		1,560	47.9	▼13.1
Registered electors		3,254		
Labour gain from SNP		Swing	▲1.1	

=== Biggar/Symington and Black Mount ===
Biggar/Symington and Black Mount
Party	Candidate	Votes	%	±%
SNP	Tom McAlpine	1,166	64.6	▲5.8
Conservative	John Lyon	485	26.9	▼4.3
Labour	Angela McGranachan	155	8.6	▼1.4
Majority		681	37.7	▲10.1
Turnout		1,806	53.5	▼11.5
Registered electors		3,378		
SNP hold		Swing	▲5.0	

=== Duneaton/Carmichael ===
Duneaton/Carmichael
Party	Candidate	Votes	%	±%
Conservative	Alexander Forrest	878	55.5	▼1.2
SNP	Thomas Mitchell	441	27.9	▲5.0
Labour	Michael Derrington	263	16.6	▼3.8
Majority		437	27.6	▼6.2
Turnout		1,582	53.8	▼5.2
Registered electors		2,943		
Conservative hold		Swing	▼3.1	

=== Carstairs/Carnwath ===
Carstairs/Carnwath
Party	Candidate	Votes	%	±%
SNP	Beverly Gauld	831	55.5	▲7.8
Labour	Lindy Barbour	428	28.6	▼4.8
Conservative	Elizabeth Ross-Taylor	239	16.0	▼2.8
Majority		403	26.9	▲12.6
Turnout		1,498	45.8	▼12.2
Registered electors		3,270		
Labour hold		Swing	▲5.3	

=== Douglas ===
Douglas
Party	Candidate	Votes	%	±%
Labour	Daniel Meikle	1,661	65.2	▲21.3
SNP	Lindsay Addison	804	31.6	▼18.0
Conservative	David Parton	82	3.2	▼3.3
Majority		857	33.6	N/A
Turnout		2,547	67.3	▼3.7
Registered electors		3,783		
Labour gain from SNP		Swing	▲19.6	

=== Carluke/Whitehill ===
Carluke/Whitehill
Party	Candidate	Votes	%	±%
Labour	Eileen Logan	1,276	63.9	Steady
SNP	Stuart Moffat	509	25.5	▼10.6
Conservative	Donald Hopkins	211	10.6	New
Majority		767	38.4	▲10.6
Turnout		1,996	48.2	▼12.8
Registered electors		4,139		
Labour hold		Swing	▲5.3	

=== Carluke/Crawforddyke ===
Carluke/Crawforddyke
Party	Candidate	Votes	%	±%
Labour	William Ross	1,114	60.4	▲8.9
SNP	John Allan	537	29.1	▼12.1
Conservative	Henry Ross-Taylor	192	10.4	▲3.1
Majority		577	31.3	▲21.0
Turnout		1,843	49.6	▼15.4
Registered electors		3,714		
Labour hold		Swing	▲10.5	

=== Forth ===
Forth
Party	Candidate	Votes	%	±%
SNP	Ian Gray	920	46.6	▲5.2
Labour	John Roberts	745	37.7	▼20.9
Conservative	David Taylor	310	15.7	New
Majority		175	8.9	N/A
Turnout		1,975	51.9	▼9.1
Registered electors		3,804		
SNP gain from Labour		Swing	▲13.0	

=== Law/Carluke ===
Law/Carluke
Party	Candidate	Votes	%	±%
SNP	David Shearer	979	49.2	▼7.5
Labour	Edward Wright	793	39.9	▲8.7
Conservative	James Young	216	10.9	▼1.2
Majority		186	9.4	▼16.1
Turnout		1,988	50.7	▼13.3
Registered electors		3,918		
SNP hold		Swing	▼8.1	

=== Long Calderwood ===
Long Calderwood
Party	Candidate	Votes	%	±%
Labour	Anthony Carlin	892	54.7	▼0.8
SNP	John Lowe	631	38.7	▼5.8
Conservative	Malcolm Gauld	108	6.6	New
Majority		261	16.0	▲5.0
Turnout		1,631	48.7	▼10.3
Registered electors		3,346		
Labour hold		Swing	▲2.5	

=== Calderglen ===
Calderglen
Party	Candidate	Votes	%	±%
SNP	James Wardhaugh	959	51.2	▲11.1
Labour	John Cairney	732	39.1	▼0.3
Conservative	Robert Young	181	9.7	▲0.1
Majority		227	12.1	▲11.4
Turnout		1,872	55.3	▼9.7
Registered electors		3,387		
SNP hold		Swing	▲5.7	

=== Blacklaw ===
Blacklaw
Party	Candidate	Votes	%	±%
SNP	Anne Maggs	1,082	56.5	▲6.7
Labour	John Quinn	559	29.2	▼8.1
Conservative	Ian Harrow	273	14.3	▲1.4
Majority		523	27.3	▲13.8
Turnout		1,914	57.0	▼12.0
Registered electors		3,360		
SNP hold		Swing	▲7.4	

=== Morrishall ===
Morrishall
Party	Candidate	Votes	%	±%
Labour	Alan Dick	949	54.4	▼4.7
SNP	Stephen McKellar	623	35.7	▲4.4
Conservative	Agnes Cameron	171	9.8	▲0.1
Majority		326	18.7	▼9.1
Turnout		1,743	53.3	▼9.7
Registered electors		3,271		
Labour hold		Swing	▼4.5	

=== Maxwellton ===
Maxwellton
Party	Candidate	Votes	%	±%
Labour	Christopher Thomson	929	52.0	▼1.7
SNP	John McKenna	649	36.3	▲0.7
Conservative	Ian McCulloch	208	11.6	▲0.8
Majority		280	15.7	▼2.4
Turnout		1,786	54.2	▼11.8
Registered electors		3,295		
Labour hold		Swing	▲1.2	

=== East Mains ===
East Mains
Party	Candidate	Votes	%	±%
Labour	Alice Mitchell	898	47.2	▼14.8
SNP	Clare Keane	831	43.6	▲5.6
Conservative	Helen McCallum	175	9.2	New
Majority		67	3.6	▼20.4
Turnout		1,904	56.1	▼8.9
Registered electors		3,392		
Labour hold		Swing	▼10.2	

=== West Mains ===
West Mains
Party	Candidate	Votes	%	±%
Labour	William McNab	994	52.7	▼10.7
SNP	Scot MacQueen	533	28.2	▼8.4
Scottish Socialist	W. Kane	203	10.8	New
Conservative	Isabella Perratt	157	8.3	New
Majority		461	24.4	▼2.5
Turnout		1,887	54.7	▼10.3
Registered electors		3,448		
Labour hold		Swing	▲1.1	

=== Duncanrig ===
Duncanrig
Party	Candidate	Votes	%	±%
Labour	Stewart Crawford	946	54.8	▼5.2
SNP	John MacQueen	449	26.0	▼14.0
Scottish Socialist	Mark Sands	205	11.9	New
Conservative	Jean Davidson	125	7.2	New
Majority		497	28.8	▲8.8
Turnout		1,725	52.8	▼10.2
Registered electors		3,264		
Labour hold		Swing	▲4.4	

=== Westwoodhill ===
Westwoodhill
Party	Candidate	Votes	%	±%
Labour	Graham Scott	914	57.4	▲10.6
SNP	Hugh Gavin	567	35.6	▲1.2
Conservative	Anne Stewart	112	7.0	New
Majority		347	21.8	▲9.4
Turnout		1,593	50.1	▼12.9
Registered electors		3,178		
Labour hold		Swing	▲4.7	

=== Headhouse ===
Headhouse
Party	Candidate	Votes	%	±%
Labour	Pat Watters	849	50.7	▲4.9
SNP	Diane McAnsh	492	29.4	▼1.9
Scottish Socialist	John Shaw	201	12.0	New
Conservative	Patricia Harrow	131	7.8	New
Majority		357	21.3	▲6.8
Turnout		1,673	53.2	▼9.8
Registered electors		3,143		
Labour hold		Swing	▲3.2	

=== Heatheryknowe ===
Heatheryknowe
Party	Candidate	Votes	%	±%
Labour	Gerry Convery	876	55.4	▼3.3
SNP	Graeme Macklin	464	29.3	▼12.0
Scottish Socialist	Theresa Barr	150	9.5	New
Conservative	Gavin Douglas	91	5.8	New
Majority		412	26.1	▲8.7
Turnout		1,581	50.0	▼10.0
Registered electors		3,164		
Labour hold		Swing	▲4.3	

=== Greenhills ===
Greenhills
Party	Candidate	Votes	%	±%
SNP	Archie Buchanan	1,003	66.4	▲1.0
Labour	Marcel Legowski	358	23.7	▼7.7
Scottish Socialist	Catherine Pedersen	107	7.1	New
Conservative	Moira Brown	42	2.8	New
Majority		645	42.7	▲8.7
Turnout		1,510	47.3	▼11.7
Registered electors		3,194		
SNP hold		Swing	▲4.3	

=== Whitehills ===
Whitehills
Party	Candidate	Votes	%	±%
Labour	James Docherty	905	56.5	▼6.8
SNP	Douglas Edwards	627	39.1	▲8.9
Conservative	Kenneth Lawton	71	4.4	New
Majority		278	17.3	▼15.8
Turnout		1,603	46.8	▼12.2
Registered electors		3,426		
Labour hold		Swing	▼7.8	

=== Hairmyres/Crosshouse ===
Hairmyres/Crosshouse
Party	Candidate	Votes	%	±%
SNP	David Watson	883	52.3	▲5.8
Labour	John Timoney	563	33.3	▼3.9
Conservative	Jane Steel	133	7.9	▲0.9
Liberal Democrats	Colin Linskey	110	6.5	▲0.9
Majority		320	18.9	▲9.6
Turnout		1,689	50.5	▼11.5
Registered electors		3,342		
SNP hold		Swing	▲4.8	

=== Mossneuk/Kittoch ===
Mossneuk/Kittoch
Party	Candidate	Votes	%	±%
Labour	Michael McCann	1,017	54.6	▲14.0
SNP	John Anderson	558	29.9	▼4.6
Conservative	Margaret McCulloch	289	15.5	9.4
Majority		459	24.6	▲18.6
Turnout		1,864	51.2	▼10.8
Registered electors		3,641		
Labour hold		Swing	▲9.3	

=== Stewartfield ===
Stewartfield
Party	Candidate	Votes	%	±%
Labour	Carol Hughes	989	51.7	▲3.8
SNP	Elaine McDougall	548	28.6	▼2.5
Conservative	Margaret Lang	377	19.7	▼1.4
Majority		441	23.0	▲6.2
Turnout		1,914	51.5	▼8.5
Registered electors		3,716		
Labour hold		Swing	▲3.1	

=== Lindsay ===
Lindsay
Party	Candidate	Votes	%	±%
Labour	Gerald Docherty	836	41.6	▲0.5
SNP	John Anderson	800	39.8	▼0.4
Conservative	Matthew Ferguson	374	18.6	▲0.1
Majority		36	1.8	▲0.9
Turnout		2,010	49.1	▼14.9
Registered electors		4,092		
Labour hold		Swing	▲0.4	

=== Avondale North ===
Avondale North
Party	Candidate	Votes	%	±%
Labour	James Malloy	767	37.4	▼1.0
Conservative	Carol Ballard	531	25.9	▼1.3
SNP	William Holman	501	24.4	▲13.4
Liberal Democrats	George Stewart	251	12.2	▼11.2
Majority		236	11.5	▲0.3
Turnout		2,050	51.4	▼10.6
Registered electors		3,986		
Labour hold		Swing	▼7.2	

=== Avondale South ===
Avondale South
Party	Candidate	Votes	%	±%
Conservative	Hector MacDonald	843	41.7	▼3.2
Labour	Peter Duff	557	27.5	▲1.6
SNP	Alan Stevenson	441	21.8	▼4.2
Liberal Democrats	Nigel Benzies	182	9.0	New
Majority		286	14.1	▼1.7
Turnout		2,023	52.9	▼13.1
Registered electors		3,827		
Conservative hold		Swing	▼2.4	

=== Blantyre West ===
Blantyre West
Party	Candidate	Votes	%	±%
Labour	Michael McGlynn	847	52.0	▼7.7
Independent	Russell Craig	357	21.9	New
SNP	Alan Fergusson	290	17.8	▼12.4
Conservative	James Stewart	134	8.2	▼1.9
Majority		490	30.1	▲0.5
Turnout		1,628	42.2	▼17.3
Registered electors		3,856		
Labour hold		Swing	▼14.8	

=== Coatshill/Low Blantyre ===
Coatshill/Low Blantyre
Party	Candidate	Votes	%	±%
Labour	Jim Handibode	949	60.2	▼8.1
SNP	Catherine Sutherland	249	15.8	▼9.3
Scottish Socialist	Georgina Mitchell	202	12.8	New
Independent	Thomas Conway	108	6.9	New
Conservative	Gladys Murray	68	4.3	▼2.3
Majority		700	44.4	▲1.1
Turnout		1,576	44.9	▼10.8
Registered electors		3,513		
Labour hold		Swing	▼2.3	

=== Burnbank/Blantyre ===
Burnbank/Blantyre
Party	Candidate	Votes	%	±%
Labour	Davie McLachlan	1,085	66.4	▲2.6
SNP	Iain Sutherland	428	26.2	▼3.7
Conservative	Elizabeth Gardiner	120	7.3	▲1.0
Majority		657	40.2	▲6.2
Turnout		1,633	41.5	▼6.7
Registered electors		3,937		
Labour hold		Swing	▲3.1	

=== High Blantyre ===
High Blantyre
Party	Candidate	Votes	%	±%
Independent	Bert Thomson	873	50.0	▲50.0
Labour	Hugh Dunsmuir	590	33.8	▼27.1
SNP	James Henderson	211	12.1	▼19.8
Conservative	Ann Blair	72	4.1	▼3.1
Majority		283	16.2	N/A
Turnout		1,746	49.2	▼7.2
Registered electors		3,549		
Independent gain from Labour		Swing	▲38.5	

=== Hamilton Centre North ===
Hamilton Centre North
Party	Candidate	Votes	%	±%
Labour	Mary Smith	881	53.1	▲4.3
SNP	Barbara Samson	486	29.3	▼2.4
Conservative	Charles Ferguson	292	17.6	▼0.9
Majority		395	23.8	▲6.7
Turnout		1,659	47.7	▼8.6
Registered electors		3,479		
Labour hold		Swing	▲3.3	

=== Whitehill ===
Whitehill
Party	Candidate	Votes	%	±%
Labour	Maureen Devlin	622	50.3	▼6.9
SNP	Pamela Smith	288	23.3	▼9.5
Conservative	Jean McAlpine	116	9.4	New
Scottish Socialist	Micheal Martin	112	9.1	New
Liberal Democrats	John Oswald	98	7.9	New
Majority		334	27.0	▲2.6
Turnout		1,236	37.9	▼10.0
Registered electors		3,259		
Labour hold		Swing	▲1.3	

=== Bothwell South ===
Bothwell South
Party	Candidate	Votes	%	±%
Labour	Alexander McGuire	707	48.6	▲7.3
Conservative	Henry Mitchell	512	35.2	▲11.4
SNP	Nicholas Gauld	237	16.3	▼7.8
Majority		195	13.4	▼3.8
Turnout		1,456	47.4	▼15.1
Registered electors		3,071		
Labour hold		Swing	▼2.0	

=== Uddingston South/Bothwell ===
Uddingston South/Bothwell
Party	Candidate	Votes	%	±%
Labour	John Ormiston	796	54.9	▲3.5
Conservative	Raymond Ferguson	332	22.9	▼2.3
SNP	Margaret Fergusson	323	22.3	▼1.1
Majority		464	32.0	▲5.9
Turnout		1,451	46.3	▼16.1
Registered electors		3,137		
Labour hold		Swing	▲2.9	

=== Uddingston ===
Uddingston
Party	Candidate	Votes	%	±%
Labour	Patrick Morgan	849	56.3	▲5.4
SNP	James Wright	344	22.8	▼3.1
Conservative	Elizabeth Montgomery	315	20.9	▼2.3
Majority		505	33.5	▲8.4
Turnout		1,508	48.4	▼10.9
Registered electors		3,117		
Labour hold		Swing	▲4.2	

=== Hillhouse ===
Hillhouse
Party	Candidate	Votes	%	±%
Independent	Graeme Horne	620	48.3	New
Labour	Jean McKeown	610	47.5	▼17.7
Conservative	Janet Brown	54	4.2	▼3.8
Majority		10	0.8	N/A
Turnout		1,284	45.8	▼3.8
Registered electors		2,802		
Independent gain from Labour		Swing	▲33.0	

=== Udston ===
Udston
Party	Candidate	Votes	%	±%
Labour	James Daisley	546	54.4	▼11.8
Independent	William Wishart	415	41.3	New
Conservative	Janette McAlpine	43	4.3	▼3.8
Majority		131	13.0	▼27.4
Turnout		1,004	41.0	▼8.8
Registered electors		2,449		
Labour hold		Swing	▼26.5	

=== Wellhall/Earnock ===
Wellhall/Earnock
Party	Candidate	Votes	%	±%
Labour	Allan Falconer	1,018	64.3	▼16.4
SNP	Patrick Lee	349	22.1	▲8.5
Conservative	Douglas Walker	215	13.6	▲8.0
Majority		669	42.3	▼24.8
Turnout		1,582	42.9	▼7.3
Registered electors		3,687		
Labour hold		Swing	▼12.4	

=== Earnock ===
Earnock
Party	Candidate	Votes	%	±%
Independent	Thomas Gilligan	1,231	65.3	New
Labour	Margaret Duffy	518	27.5	▼25.8
Conservative	Morag Redpath	135	7.2	New
Majority		713	37.8	N/A
Turnout		1,884	52.4	▼7.3
Registered electors		3,597		
Independent gain from Labour		Swing	▲46.4	

=== Woodhead/Meikle Earnock ===
Woodhead/Meikle Earnock
Party	Candidate	Votes	%	±%
Labour	Catherine Condie	827	64.2	▼0.3
SNP	Sean Tait	347	26.9	▼1.6
Conservative	Anne Kegg	114	8.9	▲1.9
Majority		480	37.3	▲1.3
Turnout		1,288	39.3	▼14.1
Registered electors		3,274		
Labour hold		Swing	▲0.6	

=== Hamilton Centre/Ferniegair ===
Hamilton Centre/Ferniegair
Party	Candidate	Votes	%	±%
Labour	Mary Smith	931	54.3	▲8.0
SNP	James McGuigan	511	29.8	▲4.6
Conservative	Gary Scullion	273	15.9	▼12.6
Majority		420	24.5	▲6.7
Turnout		1,715	50.8	▼8.7
Registered electors		3,378		
Labour hold		Swing	▲1.7	

=== Low Waters ===
Low Waters
Party	Candidate	Votes	%	±%
Labour	Joe Lowe	1,012	69.1	▲0.3
SNP	Margaret McKenzie	337	23.0	▼0.6
Conservative	David Thomas	116	7.9	▲0.3
Majority		685	46.1	▲0.8
Turnout		1,465	42.6	▼12.0
Registered electors		3,443		
Labour hold		Swing	▲0.4	

=== Silvertonhill ===
Silvertonhill
Party	Candidate	Votes	%	±%
Labour	Brian McCaig	705	37.2	▲2.6
SNP	Robert Lawson	683	36.1	▲2.4
Conservative	John Murray	506	26.7	▲6.9
Majority		22	1.2	▲0.3
Turnout		1,894	56.0	▼12.8
Registered electors		3,385		
Labour hold		Swing	▲0.1	

=== Cadzow ===
Cadzow
Party	Candidate	Votes	%	±%
Labour	Elizabeth Handibode	1,015	55.1	▼2.0
SNP	Boyd Park	595	32.3	▲1.5
Conservative	Neil Cameron	232	12.6	▲0.5
Majority		420	22.8	▼3.5
Turnout		1,842	45.5	▼12.5
Registered electors		4,050		
Labour hold		Swing	▼1.7	

=== Dalserf ===
Dalserf
Party	Candidate	Votes	%	±%
Labour	Mushtaq Ahmad	903	47.0	▼8.7
SNP	Lesley McDonald	757	39.4	▼4.9
Conservative	John Lyon	260	13.5	New
Majority		146	7.6	▼3.9
Turnout		1,920	47.7	▼8.6
Registered electors		4,029		
Labour hold		Swing	▼1.9	

=== Larkhall East ===
Larkhall East
Party	Candidate	Votes	%	±%
Labour	David Tremble	843	51.6	▼10.1
SNP	Iain McGowan	510	31.2	▼7.1
Liberal Democrats	Callan Dick	150	9.2	New
Conservative	William Rennie	131	8.0	New
Majority		333	20.4	▼2.9
Turnout		1,634	44.8	▼10.8
Registered electors		3,649		
Labour hold		Swing	▼1.5	

=== Larkhall West ===
Larkhall West
Party	Candidate	Votes	%	±%
Labour	Samuel Casserly	839	45.7	▼12.4
SNP	Barry Douglas	829	45.2	▲3.3
Conservative	Jean Pretswell	166	9.1	New
Majority		10	0.5	▼15.6
Turnout		1,834	48.0	▼5.6
Registered electors		3,819		
Labour hold		Swing	▼7.8	

=== Larkhall South ===
Larkhall South
Party	Candidate	Votes	%	±%
Labour	Jackie Burns	1,004	70.7	▲3.8
SNP	Robert Murray	302	21.3	▼11.8
Conservative	David Murray	114	8.0	New
Majority		702	49.4	▲15.6
Turnout		1,420	45.0	▼9.3
Registered electors		3,155		
Labour hold		Swing	▲7.8	

=== Stonehouse ===
Stonehouse
Party	Candidate	Votes	%	±%
Labour	John McInnes	893	50.9	▲2.1
SNP	Peter Craig	691	39.4	▼1.3
Conservative	Elizabeth Colley	169	9.6	▼0.9
Majority		202	11.5	▲3.4
Turnout		1,753	53.2	▼10.4
Registered electors		3,298		
Labour hold		Swing	▲1.7	

=== Rutherglen West ===
Rutherglen West
Party	Candidate	Votes	%	±%
Labour	Denis McKenna	835	60.7	▲4.8
SNP	Anne Higgins	233	16.9	▼13.5
Scottish Socialist	Alistair Fulton	166	12.1	New
Liberal Democrats	John McLellan	141	10.3	▼3.4
Majority		602	43.8	▲18.3
Turnout		1,375	40.8	▼9.5
Registered electors		3,372		
Labour hold		Swing	▲9.1	

=== Stonelaw ===
Stonelaw
Party	Candidate	Votes	%	±%
Liberal Democrats	Gretel Ross	1,012	54.6	▼3.9
Labour	Andrew Moffat	357	19.3	▲1.1
Conservative	Malcolm MacAskill	214	11.5	▲2.8
SNP	Sherwood Shea	175	9.4	▼5.2
Scottish Socialist	David Sharp	95	5.1	New
Majority		655	35.3	▼4.9
Turnout		1,853	51.1	▼12.0
Registered electors		3,628		
Liberal Democrats hold		Swing	▼2.5	

=== Bankhead ===
Bankhead
Party	Candidate	Votes	%	±%
Labour	Eddie McAvoy	1,022	56.8	▼2.3
SNP	Mary Donnelly	269	15.0	▼6.9
Liberal Democrats	Charles Clark	203	11.3	▼1.5
Conservative	Graeme Livingstone	158	8.8	▼4.0
Scottish Socialist	David Stevenson	147	8.2	New
Majority		753	41.9	▲4.7
Turnout		1,799	51.5	▼9.5
Registered electors		3,490		
Labour hold		Swing	▲2.3	

=== Spittal/Blairbeth ===
Spittal/Blairbeth
Party	Candidate	Votes	%	±%
Labour	William McCaig	971	57.1	▲6.7
Liberal Democrats	David Crowe	336	19.8	▼8.9
SNP	D. Bryson	198	11.6	▼1.8
Conservative	Robina Muir	148	8.7	▲1.1
Scottish Unionist	Gordon Jamieson	47	3.1	New
Majority		635	37.4	▲15.7
Turnout		1,700	51.9	▼13.0
Registered electors		3,273		
Labour hold		Swing	▲7.8	

=== Burgh ===
Burgh
Party	Candidate	Votes	%	±%
Labour	Brian McKenna	875	52.7	▲3.8
Liberal Democrats	Elizabeth Jackson	243	14.6	▼8.6
SNP	Linda Douglas	240	14.5	▼7.3
Scottish Socialist	Gerard McMahon	176	10.6	New
Scottish Unionist	Thomas Rooney	125	7.5	New
Majority		632	38.1	▲12.4
Turnout		1,659	44.3	▼11.7
Registered electors		3,745		
Labour hold		Swing	▲6.2	

=== Cairns ===
Cairns
Party	Candidate	Votes	%	±%
Labour	Pam Clearie	908	60.0	▲4.4
SNP	John Higgins	335	22.1	▼2.8
Liberal Democrats	Alexander Young	271	17.9	▲8.4
Majority		573	37.8	▲7.1
Turnout		1,514	45.1	▼10.1
Registered electors		3,359		
Labour hold		Swing	▲3.6	

=== Hallside ===
Hallside
Party	Candidate	Votes	%	±%
Labour	Davy Keirs	1,332	59.7	▼5.6
SNP	Margaret Fox	489	21.9	▼1.2
Liberal Democrats	John Rodgers	221	9.9	▲3.2
Scottish Socialist	Lorraine Sharp	189	8.5	New
Majority		843	37.8	▼4.4
Turnout		2,231	43.0	▼12.5
Registered electors		5,187		
Labour hold		Swing	▼2.2	

=== Cambuslang Central ===
Cambuslang Central
Party	Candidate	Votes	%	±%
Labour	Bob Rooney	959	58.9	▼1.4
SNP	Clare McColl	240	14.7	▼6.8
Conservative	Ronald Muir	156	9.6	▲0.6
Liberal Democrats	Karen McCallum	147	9.0	▼0.2
Scottish Socialist	Paul Drown	127	7.8	New
Majority		719	44.1	▲5.3
Turnout		1,629	49.1	▼8.5
Registered electors		3,317		
Labour hold		Swing	▲2.7	

=== Cathkin/Springhall ===
Cathkin/Springhall
Party	Candidate	Votes	%	±%
Labour	Russell Clearie	965	54.3	▲3.8
Liberal Democrats	Gordon Bryce	310	17.4	▼15.0
Conservative	Allan Kenneth	184	10.4	New
SNP	Marion Lennox	170	9.6	▼7.5
Scottish Socialist	David McClemont	148	8.3	New
Majority		655	36.9	▲18.7
Turnout		1,777	52.9	▼6.5
Registered electors		3,360		
Labour hold		Swing	▲9.4	

=== Fernhill ===
Fernhill
Party	Candidate	Votes	%	±%
Labour	Patricia Osborne	644	43.6	▼0.8
Liberal Democrats	Margaret McLellan	500	33.8	▼2.5
SNP	Euan Fergusson	136	9.2	▼10.2
Scottish Socialist	John Starrs	115	7.8	New
Scottish Unionist	James Nixon	83	5.6	New
Majority		144	9.7	▲1.6
Turnout		1,478	52.5	▼4.3
Registered electors		2,815		
Labour hold		Swing	▲0.8	

=== Kirkhill/Whitlawburn ===
Kirkhill/Whitlawburn
Party	Candidate	Votes	%	±%
Liberal Democrats	David Baillie	609	36.1	▲3.8
Labour	Patrick McKenna	574	34.0	▼5.9
Conservative	Moya MacAskill	201	11.9	▲1.1
SNP	William McIntyre	189	11.2	▼5.7
Scottish Socialist	Stephanie Sharp	116	6.9	New
Majority		35	2.1	N/A
Turnout		1,689	50.3	▼5.5
Registered electors		3,361		
Liberal Democrats gain from Labour		Swing	▲4.8	

=== Eastfield ===
Eastfield
Party	Candidate	Votes	%	±%
Labour	John McGuinness	1,020	53.8	▼0.9
SNP	Gordon Clark	278	14.7	▼6.6
Conservative	Jean Miller	235	12.4	▲2.0
Liberal Democrats	Robert Bell	233	12.3	▼1.2
Scottish Socialist	Alan Buchanan	130	6.9	New
Majority		742	39.1	▲5.7
Turnout		1,896	55.3	▼10.9
Registered electors		3,429		
Labour hold		Swing	▲2.8	

== Aftermath ==
Labour retained control of the council with a reduced majority.

=== By-elections ===
==== Bothwell South ====
Bothwell South by-election, 26 August 2004
Party	Candidate	Votes	%	±%
Conservative		594	48.4	▲13.2
Labour		377	30.7	▼18.1
Liberal Democrats		143	11.7	New
SNP		67	5.5	▼10.8
Scottish Senior Citizens		26	2.1	New
Scottish Socialist		20	1.6	New
Majority		217	17.7	N/A
Conservative gain from Labour		Swing	▲15.6	

==== Avondale South ====
Avondale South by-election, 30 March 2006
Party	Candidate	Votes	%	±%
Conservative	Stanley Hogarth	775	50.9	▲9.2
Labour	Peter Duff	315	20.6	▼6.9
SNP	William Holman	221	14.5	▼7.3
Independent	Stuart Brown	79	5.1	New
Scottish Green	Kirsten Robb	71	4.6	New
Liberal Democrats	Bernard Hughes	59	3.8	▼5.2
Majority		460	30.2	▲16.1
Turnout		1,522	39.8	▼13.1
Registered electors		3,822		
Conservative hold		Swing	▲8.0	

==== Biggar/Symington and Black Mount ====
Biggar/Symington and Black Mount by-election, 11 May 2006
Party	Candidate	Votes	%	±%
Conservative	Hamish Stewart	816	47.2	▲20.3
SNP	Tom Mitchell	523	30.3	▼34.3
Independent	Peter Rae	295	17.0	New
Labour	Ralph Barker	87	5.0	▼3.6
Majority		293	16.9	N/A
Turnout		1,726	49.3	▼4.2
Registered electors		3,499		
Conservative gain from SNP		Swing	▲27.3	
