= Clydesdale South (ward) =

Electoral ward in South Lanarkshire, Scotland

- South Lanarkshire
- Boundary of Clydesdale South in South Lanarkshire from 2007–2017.
- Population: 14,621 (2021)
- Electorate: 11,706 (2022)
- Major settlements: Lesmahagow
- Scottish Parliament constituency: Clydesdale
- Scottish Parliament region: South Scotland
- UK Parliament constituency: Hamilton and Clyde Valley; Dumfriesshire, Clydesdale and Tweeddale

Current ward
- Created: 2007
- Number of councillors: 3
- Councillor: Mark Horsham (SNP)
- Councillor: Ross Gowland (Labour)
- Councillor: Ross Lambie (Reform)
- Created from: Blackwood; Clyde Valley; Douglas; Lesmahagow

Clydesdale South is one of the 20 electoral wards of South Lanarkshire Council. Created in 2007, the ward elects three councillors using the single transferable vote electoral system and covers an area with a population of 14,621 people.

The ward was previously a Labour stronghold, with the party holding all three seats between 2014 and 2017. However, it has since become split between Labour, the Scottish National Party (SNP) and the Conservatives.

== Boundaries ==
The ward was created following the Fourth Statutory Reviews of Electoral Arrangements ahead of the 2007 Scottish local elections. As a result of the Local Governance (Scotland) Act 2004, local elections in Scotland would use the single transferable vote electoral system from 2007 onwards, so Clydesdale South was formed from an amalgamation of several previous first-past-the-post wards. It contained the majority of the former Lesmahagow ward and part of the former Clyde Valley ward, as well as all the former Blackwood and Douglas wards. Unlike the name suggests, Clydesdale South covers a primarily rural area in western Clydesdale in the southwest of South Lanarkshire next to its boundary with East Ayrshire. The largest settlements in the ward are Blackwood/Kirkmuirhill and Lesmahagow and it includes the villages of Coalburn, Douglas and Rigside. Following the Fifth Statutory Reviews of Electoral Arrangements ahead of the 2017 Scottish local elections, the ward's boundaries were not changed.

== Councillors ==
Year	Councillors		
2007	Archie Manson (SNP)	Danny Meikle (Labour)	Alex McInnes (Labour)
2012	Archie Manson (SNP)	George Greenshields (Labour/ Independent)	Alex McInnes (Labour)
2014 by-election	Gordon Muir (Labour)	George Greenshields (Labour/ Independent)	Alex McInnes (Labour)
2017	Mark Horsham (SNP/ Independent)	George Greenshields (Labour/ Independent)	Colin McGavigan (Conservative/ Independent)
2018	Mark Horsham (SNP/ Independent)	George Greenshields (Labour/ Independent)	Colin McGavigan (Conservative/ Independent)
2020	Mark Horsham (SNP/ Independent)	George Greenshields (Labour/ Independent)	Colin McGavigan (Conservative/ Independent)
2022	Mark Horsham (SNP/ Independent)	Ross Gowland (Labour)	Ross Lambie (Conservative/ Reform UK)
2023	Mark Horsham (SNP/ Independent)	Ross Gowland (Labour)	Ross Lambie (Conservative/ Reform UK)
2025	Mark Horsham (SNP/ Independent)	Ross Gowland (Labour)	Ross Lambie (Conservative/ Reform UK)

== Election results ==
=== 2022 election ===
Clydesdale South - 3 seats
Party	Candidate	FPv%	Count							
Party	Candidate	FPv%	1	2	3	4	5	6	7	8
SNP	Mark Horsham (incumbent)	33.5	1,762							
Labour	Ross Gowland	21.7	1,144	1,199	1,204	1,390				
Conservative	Ross Lambie	18.7	986	993	1,006	1,019	1,031	1,094	1,119	1,447
Independent	George Greenshields (incumbent)	12.1	635	682	688	701	719	867	987	
Independent	Colin McGavigan (incumbent)	5.7	298	329	341	345	352			
Labour	Imogen Walker	4.2	219	248	251					
Green	Ann McGuinness	3.1	164	324	330	344	352	392		
UKIP	Janice MacKay	1.0	52	57						
Electorate: 11,706 Valid: 5,260 Spoilt: 68 Quota: 1,316 Turnout: 45.5%

=== 2017 election ===
Clydesdale South - 3 seats
Party	Candidate	FPv%	Count							
Party	Candidate	FPv%	1	2	3	4	5	6	7	8
Conservative	Colin McGavigan (Note: On 29 June 2020, Clydesdale South Conservative councillor Colin McGavigan was suspended from the party over "totally unacceptable and offensive" Facebook posts in relation to the Black Lives Matter protests. On 16 February 2021, Cllr McGavigan resigned from the party and became an independent.)	22.0	1,198	1,221	1,243	1,260	1,314	1,324	1,333	1,411
Labour	George Greenshields (incumbent) (Note: In 2018, Clydesdale South Labour councillor George Greenshields resigned from the party and became an independent.)	18.9	1,031	1,038	1,050	1,076	1,206	1,229	1,280	1,992
SNP	Mark Horsham	16.0	874	875	884	915	948	1,652		
Labour	Gordon Muir (incumbent)	15.9	866	868	880	898	983	1,022	1,053	
SNP	Sandra Mills	13.9	757	759	761	801	835			
Independent	Danny Meikle	7.8	425	428	434	443				
Green	Craig Dalzell	2.6	139	148	174					
Liberal Democrats	Kaitey Blair	1.8	97	101						
UKIP	Janice MacKay	1.2	65							
Electorate: 11,568 Valid: 5,452 Spoilt: 89 Quota: 1,364 Turnout: 47.9%

=== 2014 by-election ===
Clydesdale South by-election (5 June 2014) - 1 seat
Party	Candidate	FPv%	Count				
Party	Candidate	FPv%	1	2	3	4	5
Labour	Gordon Muir	40.8	1,492	1,512	1,559	1,819	2,366
SNP	George Sneddon	32.0	1,170	1,203	1,260	1,356	
Conservative	Donna Hood	18.0	659	674	744		
UKIP	Donald MacKay	6.4	233	247			
Green	Ruth Thomas	2.8	104				
Electorate: 11,979 Valid: 3,658 Spoilt: 52 Quota: 1,830 Turnout: 31.0%

=== 2012 election ===
Clydesdale South - 3 seats
Party	Candidate	FPv%	Count					
Party	Candidate	FPv%	1	2	3	4	5	6
SNP	Archie Manson (incumbent) (Note: Clydesdale South SNP councillor Archie Manson resigned on 14 March 2014 on health grounds. A by-election was held on 5 June 2014 and won by Labour's Gordon Muir.)	35.0	1,625					
Labour	George Greenshields	24.7	1,149	1,170				
Labour	Alex McInnes (incumbent)	18.8	875	889	894	921	1,044	1,251
Conservative	Colin McGavigan	10.5	487	494	494	562		
SNP	Tom McDonald	6.7	313	704	704	736	852	
UKIP	Chris McEwan	4.3	199	207	207			
Electorate: 11,620 Valid: 4,648 Spoilt: 113 Quota: 1,163 Turnout: 40.0%

=== 2007 election ===
Clydesdale South - 3 seats
Party	Candidate	FPv%	Count				
Party	Candidate	FPv%	1	2	3	4	5
Labour	Danny Meikle (Note: Returning councillor for Douglas single-member ward.)	27.7	1,709				
Labour	Alex McInnes (Note: Returning councillor for Lesmahagow single-member ward.)	20.2	1,245	1,351	???	1,514	???
SNP	Archie Manson (Note: Returning councillor for Blackwood single-member ward.)	18.7	1,156	1,164	???	1,341	???
SNP	David Smart	18.6	1,148	1,159	???	1,334	
Conservative	John Baillie	11.9	734	740	???		
Green	Billy McLean	3.0	183	185			
Electorate: 11,359 Valid: 6,175 Quota: 1,544 Turnout: 55.6%
