= East Kilbride Alliance =

- Founded: January 2007
- Dissolved: September 2012
- Ideology: Localism
- Colours: Black and White

Website
- http://www.ekalliance.org/

The East Kilbride Alliance was a political party operating in the town of East Kilbride, Scotland. It was formed in January 2007 with the intention of contesting the local government election (held on 3 May 2007) for the South Lanarkshire Council in the town of East Kilbride

The party's origins can be traced to a number of local groups who were dissatisfied with the actions of South Lanarkshire Council. In particular objections were raised to the sale of green space and the siting of industry near to residential areas.

Figures within the party have stated that they will not act in the traditional way as parties might be expected to if they are successful in having members returned to South Lanarkshire Council in that they will not have a party whip which members must follow, with their councillors being allowed to exercise their own judgement on each matter as to how they think their area would be best represented.

The party fielded six candidates in the local elections. The Candidates were Brian Jones (leader of the party), Colin McKay, Richard Naysmith, Iain Cameron, Tim Gingell and Claire Keane.

The party fielded three candidates in the 2012 Scottish local elections, in the South Lanarkshire council wards of East Kilbride South, East Kilbride Central North and East Kilbride West.

It de-registered with the Electoral Commission on 13 September 2012.
