= Lanark and Hamilton East =

UK Parliament constituency (2005–2024)

Coordinates: 55.524°N 3.704°W

- Former county constituency for the House of Commons
- Boundary of Lanark and Hamilton East in Scotland
- Subdivision: South Lanarkshire
- Major settlements: Carluke, Carstairs, Hamilton, Lanark, Larkhall, Uddingston

2005–2024
- Created from: Clydesdale; Hamilton North & Bellshill; Hamilton South
- Replaced by: Hamilton and Clyde Valley

Lanark and Hamilton East was a county constituency of the House of Commons of the Parliament of the United Kingdom, which was first used at the 2005 general election. It covered parts of the former Clydesdale, Hamilton North and Bellshill and Hamilton South constituencies, and it elected one Member of Parliament (MP) by the first-past-the-post voting system.

Historically a safe Labour seat, in 2015 it was gained by the Scottish National Party when they won a record 56 of the 59 Scottish seats at Westminster, ending 51 years of Labour Party dominance at UK general elections in Scotland. Two years later, at the 2017 general election, the Conservatives surged into second place, only 266 votes behind sitting MP Angela Crawley, followed by Labour in third place, just 96 votes behind the Conservative candidate, making the seat Britain's tightest three-way marginal. The result also made it the tightest three-way marginal since 1945.

Further to the completion of the 2023 Periodic Review of Westminster constituencies, the seat was abolished. Subject to major boundary changes - gaining western areas of Hamilton and losing the towns of Bothwell, Uddingston and Carluke - to be reformed as Hamilton and Clyde Valley, and was first contested at the 2024 general election.

== Constituency profile ==
The seat covered most of Hamilton and the rural area around Lanark. Electoral Calculus described the seat as "Traditional", characterised by working class people with lower levels of income and formal education.

== Boundaries ==
Map of boundaries 2005–2024

As created by the Fifth Review of the Boundary Commission for Scotland the constituency was one of six covering the Dumfries and Galloway council area, the Scottish Borders council area and the South Lanarkshire council area. The other five constituencies were: Berwickshire, Roxburgh and Selkirk, Dumfries and Galloway, Dumfriesshire, Clydesdale and Tweeddale, East Kilbride, Strathaven and Lesmahagow, and Rutherglen and Hamilton West.

The constituency was created with the electoral wards of:

- In full: Bothwell and Uddingston, Clydesdale North, Clydesdale West, Larkhall.
- In part: Clydesdale East, Clydesdale South, Hamilton North and East, Hamilton South, Hamilton West and Earnock.

== Members of Parliament ==
Election	Member	Party
2005	Jimmy Hood	Labour
2015	Angela Crawley	SNP

== Election results ==
=== Elections in the 2010s ===
General election 2019: Lanark and Hamilton East
Party	Candidate	Votes	%	±%
SNP	Angela Crawley	22,243	41.9	+9.3
Conservative	Shona Haslam	17,056	32.1	0.0
Labour	Andrew Hilland	10,736	20.2	−11.7
Liberal Democrats	Jane Pickard	3,037	5.7	+3.3
Majority		5,187	9.8	+9.3
Turnout		53,072	68.3	+3.0
SNP hold		Swing	+4.6	

General election 2017: Lanark and Hamilton East
Party	Candidate	Votes	%	±%
SNP	Angela Crawley	16,444	32.6	−16.2
Conservative	Poppy Corbett	16,178	32.1	+16.2
Labour	Andrew Hilland	16,084	31.9	+1.4
Liberal Democrats	Colin Robb	1,214	2.4	+0.2
UKIP	Donald Mackay	550	1.1	−1.5
Majority		266	0.5	−17.8
Turnout		50,470	65.3	−3.8
SNP hold		Swing	-16.2	

General election 2015: Lanark and Hamilton East
Party	Candidate	Votes	%	±%
SNP	Angela Crawley	26,976	48.8	+27.8
Labour	Jimmy Hood	16,876	30.5	−19.5
Conservative	Alex Allison	8,772	15.9	+0.9
UKIP	Donald Mackay	1,431	2.6	+1.3
Liberal Democrats	Gregg Cullen	1,203	2.2	−9.1
Majority		10,100	18.3	N/A
Turnout		55,258	69.1	+6.8
SNP gain from Labour		Swing	+23.6	

General election 2010: Lanark and Hamilton East
Party	Candidate	Votes	%	±%
Labour	Jimmy Hood	23,258	50.0	+4.0
SNP	Clare Adamson	9,780	21.0	+3.2
Conservative	Colin McGavigan	6,981	15.0	+2.2
Liberal Democrats	Douglas Herbison	5,249	11.3	−7.3
Independent	Duncan McFarlane	670	1.4	+0.4
UKIP	Rob Sale	616	1.3	+0.3
Majority		13,478	29.0	+1.6
Turnout		46,554	62.3	+3.2
Labour hold		Swing	+0.3	

=== Elections in the 2000s ===
General election 2005: Lanark and Hamilton East
Party	Candidate	Votes	%	±%
Labour	Jimmy Hood	20,072	46.0	−4.5
Liberal Democrats	Fraser Grieve	8,125	18.6	+7.3
SNP	John Wilson	7,746	17.8	−4.1
Conservative	Robert Pettigrew	5,576	12.8	+0.3
Scottish Socialist	Dennis Reilly	802	1.8	−1.3
UKIP	Donald Mackay	437	1.0	+0.5
Independent	Duncan McFarlane	416	1.0	New
Christian Vote	Robin Mawhinney	415	1.0	New
Majority		11,947	27.4	
Turnout		43,589	59.1	
Labour win (new seat)				
