= Larkhall (disambiguation) =

Larkhall is a town in South Lanarkshire, Scotland.

Larkhall may also refer to:

- Larkhall, Bath, a district of Bath, Somerset, England
- Larkhall (Lambeth ward), a ward in the London Borough of Lambeth, England
- Larkhall (South Lanarkshire ward), a ward in South Lanarkshire, Scotland
- Larkhall railway station, South Lanarkshire, Scotland
