= East Kilbride and Strathaven =

UK Parliament constituency (since 2024)

- County constituency for the House of Commons
- Interactive map of boundaries from 2024
- Boundary of East Kilbride and Strathaven in Scotland
- Subdivision: South Lanarkshire
- Electorate: 75,161 (March 2020)
- Major settlements: East Kilbride, Stonehouse, Strathaven

Current constituency
- Created: 2024
- Member of Parliament: Joani Reid (Scottish Labour)
- Seats: One
- Created from: East Kilbride, Strathaven and Lesmahagow & Lanark and Hamilton East

Overlaps
- Scottish Parliament: East Kilbride, Central Scotland, Clydesdale, South Scotland

East Kilbride and Strathaven is a constituency of the House of Commons in the UK Parliament. Further to the completion of the 2023 review of Westminster constituencies, it was first contested at the 2024 general election. It has been represented by Joani Reid since 2024.

== Boundaries ==
The constituency comprises the following wards of South Lanarkshire:

- Avondale and Stonehouse, East Kilbride Central North, East Kilbride Central South, East Kilbride East, East Kilbride South and East Kilbride West.

The vast majority of the constituency comes from the abolished East Kilbride, Strathaven and Lesmahagow constituency - excluding Lesmahagow and surrounding areas, which are now part of the new Hamilton and Clyde Valley constituency. A small section of the Avondale and Stonehouse ward came from the abolished Lanark and Hamilton East constituency.

== Members of Parliament ==
Election	Member	Party
2024	Joani Reid	Labour
March 2026	Joani Reid	Independent
July 2026	Joani Reid	Labour

== Election results ==
=== Elections in the 2020s ===
2024 general election: East Kilbride and Strathaven
Party	Candidate	Votes	%	±%
Labour	Joani Reid	22,682	48.6	+27.0
SNP	Grant Costello	13,625	29.2	−17.8
Conservative	Ross Lambie	3,547	7.6	−13.8
Reform	David Mills	3,377	7.2	N/A
Green	Ann McGuinness	1,811	3.9	+1.8
Liberal Democrats	Aisha Mir	1,074	2.3	−4.6
Scottish Family	David Richardson	505	1.1	N/A
UKIP	Donald Mackay	86	0.2	−0.9
Majority		9,057	19.4	N/A
Turnout		46,707	61.1	−7.7
Registered electors		76,415		
Labour gain from SNP		Swing	+22.4	

=== Elections in the 2010s ===
2019 notional result (Note: Estimate of the 2019 general election result as if the revised boundaries recommended under the 2023 boundary review were in place)
Party	Vote	%
SNP	24,311	47.0
Labour	11,142	21.6
Conservative	11,042	21.4
Liberal Democrats	3,556	6.9
Scottish Greens	1,074	2.1
UKIP	559	1.1
Majority	13,169	25.5
Turnout	51,684	68.8
Electorate	75,161	
