= 2022 South Lanarkshire Council election =

South Lanarkshire Council election

- 5 May 2022

All 64 seats to South Lanarkshire Council 33 seats needed for a majority
- Registered: 258,158
- Turnout: 44.3%
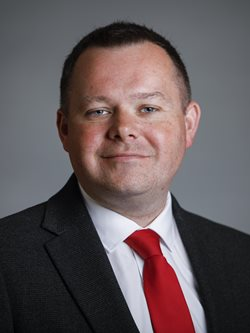

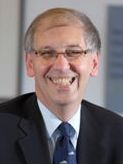
| | First party | Second party | Third party |
|---|---|---|---|
| | SNP | | Con |
| Leader | John Ross | Joe Fagan | Alex Allison |
| Party | SNP | Labour | Conservative |
| Leader's seat | Hamilton South | East Kilbride Central North | Clydesdale East |
| Last election | 27 seats, 35.7% | 22 seats, 29.0% | 14 seats, 23.9% |
| Seats before | 25 | 17 | 11 |
| Seats won | 27 | 24 | 7 |
| Seat change | Steady | ▲2 | ▼7 |
| Popular vote | 42,295 | 36,305 | 19,803 |
| Percentage | 36.9% | 31.7% | 17.3% |
| Swing | ▲1.2% | ▲2.7% | ▼6.6% |
| | Fourth party | Fifth party | Sixth party |
| | | Ind | Grn |
| Leader | Robert Brown | Margaret Cooper | Kirsten Robb |
| Party | Liberal Democrats | Independent | Green |
| Leader's seat | Rutherglen South | Avondale and Stonehouse | East Kilbride East |
| Last election | 1 seat, 5.1% | 0 seats, 2.5% | 0 seats, 2.9% |
| Seats before | 3 | 8 | 0 |
| Seats won | 3 | 2 | 1 |
| Seat change | ▲2 | ▲2 | ▲1 |
| Popular vote | 6,221 | 5,503 | 3,711 |
| Percentage | 5.4% | 4.8% | 3.2% |
| Swing | ▲0.3% | ▲2.3% | ▲0.3% |
- Results of the 2022 south Lanarkshire council election by ward.
Leader before election
John Ross
(SNP)
No overall control
Leader after election
Joe Fagan
(Labour)
No overall control

Elections to South Lanarkshire Council took place on 5 May 2022 on the same day as the 31 other Scottish local government elections. As with other Scottish council elections, it was held using single transferable vote (STV) – a form of proportional representation – in which multiple candidates are elected in each ward and voters rank candidates in order of preference.

For the second consecutive election, the Scottish National Party were returned with the most seats at 27 but remained shy of an overall majority. Labour made small gains to again finish second with an increased number of members with 24 – up two from 2017 – while the Conservatives lost half their number to return seven members. The Liberal Democrats and independents both made two gains to return three and two members respectively while the Greens won their first ever seat in South Lanarkshire.

On 18 May, Labour and the Lib Dems announced that they would run the council as a coalition, alongside one independent councillor, with support from the Conservatives.

== Background ==
=== Previous election ===
At the previous election in 2017, the Scottish National Party (SNP) won the most seats for the first time. Labour had won every previous election in South Lanarkshire following the local government reforms in the 1990s. The SNP gained one seat to hold 27, six shy of an overall majority, and they formed a minority administration. Labour lost 10 seats which left them with 22 while the Conservatives gained 10 seats to record their best result in a South Lanarkshire election with 14 and the Liberal Democrats held their only seat.

2017 South Lanarkshire Council election result
| Party | Seats | Vote share |
|---|---|---|
| SNP | 27 | 35.7% |
| Labour | 22 | 29.0% |
| Conservative | 14 | 23.9% |
| Liberal Democrats | 1 | 5.1% |

=== Electoral system ===
The election used the 20 wards created under the Local Governance (Scotland) Act 2004, with 64 councillors being elected. Each ward elected either 3 or 4 members, using the single transferable vote (STV) electoral system – a form of proportional representation – where candidates are ranked in order of preference.

=== Composition ===
Several changes in the composition of the council occurred between the 2017 and 2022 elections. Most were changes to the political affiliation of councillors including SNP councillors Sheena Wardhaugh, Jim Wardhaugh and David Watson and Labour councillors Margaret Cooper, Joe Lowe and George Greenshields who resigned from their respective parties to become independents. Conservative councillor Mark McGeever and Labour councillor Fiona Dryburgh switched allegiances to the Liberal Democrats. Conservative councillor Colin McGavigan was initially suspended before resigning from the party and Labour councillor Jackie Burns was expelled from the party. Two by-elections resulted in a Labour hold and an SNP hold.

Composition of South Lanarkshire Council
| Party | 2017 result | Dissolution |
|---|---|---|
| SNP | 27 | 25 |
| Labour | 22 | 17 |
| Conservative | 14 | 11 |
| Liberal Democrats | 1 | 3 |
| Independents | 0 | 8 |

=== Retiring councillors ===
Retiring councillors
| Ward | Party | Retiring councillor |
|---|---|---|
| Avondale and Stonehouse | Conservative | Graeme Campbell |
| Avondale and Stonehouse | SNP | Isobel Dorman |
| East Kilbride South | Liberal Democrats | Fiona Dryburgh |
| East Kilbride Central South | SNP | Collette Stevenson |
| Rutherglen Central and North | Conservative | Jared Wark |
| Hamilton North and East | SNP | Stephanie Callaghan |
| Hamilton South | Independent | Joe Lowe |
| Hamilton South | SNP | Josh Wilson |
| Larkhall | SNP | Peter Craig |

=== Candidates ===
The total number of candidates fell from 152 in 2017 to 143. As was the case five years previous, the SNP fielded the highest number of candidates at 37 across the 20 wards. Both Labour and the Conservatives also fielded at least one candidate in every ward but the 30 candidates fielded by Labour was two less than in 2017 whereas the Conservatives maintained a total of 21 candidates. Unlike the previous election, the Liberal Democrats did not contest every ward after only 16 candidates were selected. The Greens had contested 19 of the 20 wards in 2017 but only contested 14 this time.

The number of independent candidates increased from nine in 2017 to 11. The UK Independence Party (UKIP) (four) only fielded half as many candidates. For the first time, the Scottish Family Party, the Scottish Libertarian Party and the Alba Party fielded candidates in a South Lanarkshire election. For only the second time since 1999, the Scottish Socialist Party did not field any candidates and for the first time since 2003 neither Solidarity nor the Scottish Unionist Party fielded any candidates either.

=== Controversies ===
Larkhall councillor Jackie Burns was criticised after announcing he would be standing for re-election. In June 2021, Cllr Burns was cleared of sexual assault but was called a "nuisance drunk" by a Sheriff before being banned from public transport for pestering a woman on a bus. In 2016, Cllr Burns was convicted of a similar offence involving a 17-year-old girl and was previously fined for public urination. Prior to the 2017 election, Cllr Burns was expelled from the Labour party after he had been nominated as a candidate by the party following a conviction for breach of the peace.

Scottish Family Party candidates in Lanarkshire were accused of "extremist right wing views" by advocacy group Hope not Hate for their policies on transgender rights and hate speech legislation. The party is considered anti-LGBT but claims to be pro-free speech.

== Results ==
2022 South Lanarkshire Council election result
| Party | Seats | Gains | Losses | Net gain/loss | Seats % | Votes % | Votes | +/− |
|---|---|---|---|---|---|---|---|---|
| SNP | 27 | 1 | 1 | Steady | 42.1 | 36.9 | 42,295 | ▲1.2 |
| Labour | 24 | 2 | 0 | ▲2 | 37.5 | 31.7 | 36,305 | ▲2.7 |
| Conservative | 7 | 0 | 7 | ▼7 | 10.9 | 17.3 | 19,803 | ▼6.6 |
| Liberal Democrats | 3 | 2 | 0 | ▲2 | 4.6 | 5.4 | 6,221 | ▲0.3 |
| Independent | 2 | 2 | 0 | ▲2 | 3.1 | 4.8 | 5,503 | ▲2.3 |
| Green | 1 | 1 | 0 | ▲1 | 1.5 | 3.2 | 3,711 | ▲0.3 |
| Scottish Family | 0 | 0 | 0 | Steady | 0.0 | 0.3 | 300 | New |
| Alba | 0 | 0 | 0 | Steady | 0.0 | 0.2 | 292 | New |
| UKIP | 0 | 0 | 0 | Steady | 0.0 | 0.0 | 121 | ▼0.4 |
| Scottish Libertarian | 0 | 0 | 0 | Steady | 0.0 | 0.0 | 67 | New |
| Total | 64 | | | | | | 114,524 | |

Note: Votes are the sum of first preference votes across all council wards. The net gain/loss and percentage changes relate to the result of the previous Scottish local elections on 4 May 2017. This is because STV has an element of proportionality which is not present unless multiple seats are being elected. This may differ from other published sources showing gain/loss relative to seats held at the dissolution of Scotland's councils.

=== Ward summary ===
Results of the 2022 South Lanarkshire Council election by ward
| Ward | % | Cllrs | % | Cllrs | % | Cllrs | % | Cllrs | % | Cllrs | % | Cllrs | Total Cllrs |
| Ward | SNP | | Lab | | Con | | Lib Dem | | Green | | Others | | Total Cllrs |
|---|---|---|---|---|---|---|---|---|---|---|---|---|---|
| Clydesdale West | 32.7 | 1 | 38.2 | 2 | 23.6 | 1 | 2.4 | 0 | 3.1 | 0 | | | 4 |
| Clydesdale North | 33.4 | 1 | 33.8 | 1 | 26.9 | 1 | | | | | 6.0 | 0 | 3 |
| Clydesdale East | 33.5 | 1 | 16.4 | 1 | 40.8 | 1 | 3.1 | 0 | 5.3 | 0 | 0.9 | 0 | 3 |
| Clydesdale South | 33.5 | 1 | 25.9 | 1 | 18.7 | 1 | | | 3.1 | 0 | 18.8 | 0 | 3 |
| Avondale and Stonehouse | 28.4 | 1 | 19.8 | 1 | 20.6 | 0 | | | 6.4 | 0 | 24.8 | 1 | 3 |
| East Kilbride South | 48.7 | 2 | 23.0 | 1 | 8.7 | 0 | 13.7 | 0 | 2.9 | 0 | 3.0 | 0 | 3 |
| East Kilbride Central South | 43.9 | 2 | 38.6 | 1 | 9.1 | 0 | 2.7 | 0 | 3.9 | 0 | 1.9 | 0 | 3 |
| East Kilbride Central North | 43.8 | 2 | 37.3 | 1 | 12.2 | 0 | 3.3 | 0 | | | 3.4 | 0 | 3 |
| East Kilbride West | 30.9 | 1 | 26.5 | 1 | 20.0 | 0 | 2.1 | 0 | | | 20.5 | 1 | 3 |
| East Kilbride East | 37.4 | 1 | 27.0 | 1 | 13.5 | 0 | 2.6 | 0 | 12.7 | 1 | 6.8 | 0 | 3 |
| Rutherglen South | 31.9 | 1 | 23.2 | 1 | 8.5 | 0 | 29.4 | 1 | 4.6 | 0 | 2.4 | 0 | 3 |
| Rutherglen Central and North | 37.7 | 2 | 35.0 | 1 | 12.0 | 0 | 10.2 | 0 | 5.1 | 0 | | | 3 |
| Cambuslang West | 39.0 | 1 | 30.1 | 1 | 12.9 | 0 | 12.7 | 1 | 5.2 | 0 | | | 3 |
| Cambuslang East | 42.3 | 2 | 39.4 | 1 | 9.6 | 0 | 2.9 | 0 | 4.0 | 0 | 1.8 | 0 | 3 |
| Blantyre | 42.1 | 1 | 44.8 | 2 | 7.7 | 0 | 2.1 | 0 | 3.2 | 0 | | | 3 |
| Bothwell and Uddingston | 32.2 | 1 | 30.3 | 1 | 27.6 | 1 | 5.3 | 0 | 4.5 | 0 | | | 3 |
| Hamilton North and East | 40.8 | 1 | 32.4 | 1 | 19.0 | 1 | 5.2 | 0 | | | 2.6 | 0 | 3 |
| Hamilton West and Earnock | 41.4 | 2 | 30.7 | 1 | 12.9 | 0 | 11.9 | 1 | 3.1 | 0 | | | 4 |
| Hamilton South | 41.4 | 2 | 45.4 | 2 | 13.1 | 0 | | | | | | | 4 |
| Larkhall | 28.9 | 1 | 33.0 | 2 | 24.5 | 1 | 2.4 | 0 | | | 11.2 | 0 | 4 |
| Total | 36.9 | 27 | 31.7 | 24 | 17.3 | 7 | 5.4 | 3 | 3.2 | 1 | 5.6 | 2 | 64 |

=== Seats changing hands ===
Below is a list of seats which elected a different party or parties from 2017 in order to highlight the change in political composition of the council from the previous election. The list does not include defeated incumbents who resigned or defected from their party and subsequently failed re-election while the party held the seat.

Seats changing hands
| Seat | 2017 | | 2022 | |
| Seat | Party | Member | Party | Member |
|---|---|---|---|---|
| Clydesdale East | Conservative | Eric Holford | Labour | Ralph Barker |
| Avondale and Stonehouse | Conservative | Graeme Campbell | Independent | Margaret Cooper |
| East Kilbride West | Conservative | Ian Harrow | Independent | David Watson |
| East Kilbride East | SNP | Jim Wardhaugh | Green | Kirsten Robb |
| Rutherglen Central and North | Conservative | Jared Wark | SNP | Andrea Cowan |
| Cambuslang West | Conservative | Ann Le Blond | Liberal Democrats | Norman Rae |
| Hamilton West and Earnock | Conservative | Mark McGeever | Liberal Democrats | Mark McGeever |
| Hamilton South | Conservative | Lynne Nailon | Labour | Celine Handibode |

Notes

1. Note 1: In 2017, Cllr Cooper was elected as a Labour candidate but later resigned from the party. Labour held their seat in Avondale and Stonehouse at the 2022 election.
2. Note 2: In 2017, Cllr Watson was elected as an SNP candidate but later resigned from the party. The SNP held their seat in East Kilbride West at the 2022 election.
3. Note 3: In 2017, Jim Wardhaugh was elected as an SNP candidate but later resigned from the party.
4. Note 4: In 2017, Cllr McGeever was elected as a Conservative candidate but later defected to the Liberal Democrats.

== Ward results ==
=== Clydesdale West ===
Labour (2), the SNP (1) and the Conservatives (1) held the seats they won at the last election.

Clydesdale West - 4 seats
| Party | Candidate | FPv% | Count | | | | | |
| Party | Candidate | FPv% | 1 | 2 | 3 | 4 | 5 | 6 |
|---|---|---|---|---|---|---|---|---|
| Labour | Eileen Logan (incumbent) | 23.6 | 1,743 | | | | | |
| Conservative | Poppy Corbett (incumbent) | 23.6 | 1,742 | | | | | |
| SNP | David Shearer (incumbent) | 22.7 | 1,678 | | | | | |
| Labour | Lynsey Hamilton (incumbent) | 14.6 | 1,082 | 1,264 | 1,355 | 1,361 | 1,398 | 1,528 |
| SNP | Andrew Wilson | 10.0 | 737 | 751 | 756 | 936 | 1,035 | 1,060 |
| Green | Neil Barton | 3.1 | 230 | 236 | 243 | 249 | | |
| Liberal Democrats | Peter Charles Meehan | 2.4 | 181 | 200 | 258 | 260 | 310 | |
Electorate: 15,706 Valid: 7,393 Spoilt: 122 Quota: 1,479 Turnout: 47.8%

=== Clydesdale North ===
Labour, the SNP and the Conservatives held the seats they won at the previous election.

Clydesdale North - 3 seats
| Party | Candidate | FPv% | Count |
| Party | Candidate | FPv% | 1 |
|---|---|---|---|
| Labour | Catherine McClymont (incumbent) | 33.8 | 1,920 |
| SNP | Julia Marrs (incumbent) | 33.4 | 1,898 |
| Conservative | Richard Eliott-Lockhart (incumbent) | 26.9 | 1,530 |
| Independent | Ronald Logan | 4.9 | 277 |
| Independent | John Scott | 1.1 | 61 |
Electorate: 11,889 Valid: 5,686 Spoilt: 68 Quota: 1,422 Turnout: 48.4%

=== Clydesdale East ===
The Conservatives held one of their two seats while the SNP held their only seat and Labour gained one seat from the Conservatives.

Clydesdale East - 3 seats
| Party | Candidate | FPv% | Count | | | | | | | |
| Party | Candidate | FPv% | 1 | 2 | 3 | 4 | 5 | 6 | 7 | 8 |
|---|---|---|---|---|---|---|---|---|---|---|
| SNP | Ian McAllan (incumbent) | 28.6 | 1,513 | | | | | | | |
| Conservative | Alex Allison (incumbent) | 25.8 | 1,364 | | | | | | | |
| Labour | Ralph Barker | 16.4 | 869 | 876 | 879 | 882 | 952 | 1,034 | 1,218 | 1,517 |
| Conservative | Eric Holford (incumbent) | 15.0 | 794 | 797 | 832 | 850 | 881 | 903 | 929 | |
| Green | Claire Watson | 5.3 | 278 | 288 | 288 | 293 | 325 | | | |
| SNP | John McLatchie | 4.9 | 260 | 419 | 420 | 422 | 431 | 571 | | |
| Liberal Democrats | Nicholas Mark Tucker | 3.1 | 162 | 165 | 165 | 171 | | | | |
| Scottish Family | Gareth Kirk | 0.9 | 49 | 49 | 49 | | | | | |
Electorate: 10,578 Valid: 5,395 Spoilt: 106 Quota: 1,323 Turnout: 51.0%

=== Clydesdale South ===
The SNP, Labour and the Conservatives held the seats they won at the previous election. Independent candidates George Greenshields and Colin McGavigan were elected as Labour and Conservative candidates respectively in 2017 but later resigned from their respective parties.

Clydesdale South - 3 seats
| Party | Candidate | FPv% | Count | | | | | | | |
| Party | Candidate | FPv% | 1 | 2 | 3 | 4 | 5 | 6 | 7 | 8 |
|---|---|---|---|---|---|---|---|---|---|---|
| SNP | Mark Horsham (incumbent) | 33.5 | 1,762 | | | | | | | |
| Labour | Ross Gowland | 21.7 | 1,144 | 1,199 | 1,204 | 1,390 | | | | |
| Conservative | Ross Lambie | 18.7 | 986 | 993 | 1,006 | 1,019 | 1,031 | 1,094 | 1,119 | 1,447 |
| Independent | George Greenshields (incumbent) | 12.1 | 635 | 682 | 688 | 701 | 719 | 867 | 987 | |
| Independent | Colin McGavigan (incumbent) | 5.7 | 298 | 329 | 341 | 345 | 352 | | | |
| Labour | Imogen Walker | 4.2 | 219 | 248 | 251 | | | | | |
| Green | Ann McGuinness | 3.1 | 164 | 324 | 330 | 344 | 352 | 392 | | |
| UKIP | Janice MacKay | 1.0 | 52 | 57 | | | | | | |
Electorate: 11,706 Valid: 5,260 Spoilt: 68 Quota: 1,316 Turnout: 45.5%

=== Avondale and Stonehouse ===
The SNP and Labour held the seats they won at the previous election while the Conservatives lost their only seat to an independent candidate. In 2017, Cllr Margaret Cooper was elected as a Labour candidate but later resigned from the party. She was re-elected as an independent candidate.

Avondale and Stonehouse - 3 seats
| Party | Candidate | FPv% | Count | | | | | | |
| Party | Candidate | FPv% | 1 | 2 | 3 | 4 | 5 | 6 | 7 |
|---|---|---|---|---|---|---|---|---|---|
| Independent | Margaret Cooper (incumbent) | 23.7 | 1,629 | 1,639 | 1,740 | | | | |
| SNP | Elise Frame | 21.2 | 1,454 | 1,471 | 1,632 | 1,635 | 2,122 | | |
| Conservative | Gary Burns | 20.6 | 1,416 | 1,420 | 1,440 | 1,445 | 1,452 | 1,462 | |
| Labour | Susan Kerr | 19.8 | 1,363 | 1,367 | 1,439 | 1,444 | 1,480 | 1,619 | 2,290 |
| SNP | Leigh Payne | 7.2 | 495 | 515 | 566 | 567 | | | |
| Green | Erica Bradley-Young | 6.4 | 437 | 444 | | | | | |
| Alba | Colin MacLaren | 1.1 | 75 | | | | | | |
Electorate: 14,882 Valid: 6,869 Spoilt: 93 Quota: 1,718 Turnout: 46.8%

=== East Kilbride South ===
The SNP (2) and Labour (1) held the seats they won in the previous election.

East Kilbride South - 3 seats
| Party | Candidate | FPv% | Count | | | | | | | | |
| Party | Candidate | FPv% | 1 | 2 | 3 | 4 | 5 | 6 | 7 | 8 | 9 |
|---|---|---|---|---|---|---|---|---|---|---|---|
| SNP | Archie Buchanan (incumbent) | 36.9 | 1,948 | | | | | | | | |
| Labour | Mathew Buchanan | 23.0 | 1,215 | 1,272 | 1,282 | 1,286 | 1,300 | 1,335 | | | |
| Liberal Democrats | Paul McGarry | 13.7 | 722 | 738 | 748 | 750 | 757 | 782 | 787 | 1,042 | |
| SNP | Geri Gray (incumbent) | 11.8 | 621 | 1,103 | 1,106 | 1,130 | 1,136 | 1,220 | 1,222 | 1,235 | 1,453 |
| Conservative | Patrick Nailon | 8.7 | 458 | 461 | 463 | 467 | 486 | 490 | 492 | | |
| Green | John McKechnie | 2.9 | 154 | 180 | 182 | 192 | 198 | | | | |
| Scottish Family | Jonathan Richardson | 1.3 | 68 | 70 | 72 | 79 | | | | | |
| Alba | Iain Leckenby | 1.1 | 57 | 63 | 63 | | | | | | |
| Scottish Libertarian | Ross Gibson | 0.6 | 31 | 34 | | | | | | | |
Electorate: 12,589 Valid: 5,274 Spoilt: 111 Quota: 1,319 Turnout: 42.8%

=== East Kilbride Central South ===
The SNP (2) and Labour (1) held the seats they won at the previous election.

East Kilbride Central South - 3 seats
| Party | Candidate | FPv% | Count | | | | | | | | |
| Party | Candidate | FPv% | 1 | 2 | 3 | 4 | 5 | 6 | 7 | 8 | 9 |
|---|---|---|---|---|---|---|---|---|---|---|---|
| SNP | John Anderson (incumbent) | 30.2 | 1,570 | | | | | | | | |
| Labour | Gerry Convery (incumbent) | 26.7 | 1,387 | | | | | | | | |
| SNP | Elaine McDougall | 13.7 | 713 | 911 | 915 | 918 | 950 | 955 | 1,091 | 1,101 | 1,284 |
| Labour | Lisa Quarrell | 12.0 | 623 | 632 | 686 | 693 | 700 | 744 | 783 | 977 | |
| Conservative | Alan Fraser | 9.1 | 473 | 474 | 480 | 486 | 488 | 516 | 526 | | |
| Green | Alan Cresswell | 3.9 | 202 | 228 | 231 | 234 | 246 | 280 | | | |
| Liberal Democrats | Lorna Cammock | 2.7 | 138 | 143 | 147 | 151 | 157 | | | | |
| Alba | Rita Baillie | 1.3 | 66 | 74 | 75 | 76 | | | | | |
| UKIP | David Mackay | 0.6 | 30 | 30 | 31 | | | | | | |
Electorate: 12,012 Valid: 5,202 Spoilt: 132 Quota: 1,301 Turnout: 44.4%

=== East Kilbride Central North ===
The SNP (2) and Labour (1) held the seats they won at the previous election.

East Kilbride Central North - 3 seats
| Party | Candidate | FPv% | Count | | | | | | |
| Party | Candidate | FPv% | 1 | 2 | 3 | 4 | 5 | 6 | 7 |
|---|---|---|---|---|---|---|---|---|---|
| SNP | Grant Ferguson (incumbent) | 33.1 | 1,889 | | | | | | |
| Labour | Joe Fagan (incumbent) | 30.0 | 1,709 | | | | | | |
| Conservative | Alex Brown | 12.2 | 694 | 695 | 711 | 746 | 769 | 914 | |
| SNP | Hugh MacDonald (incumbent) | 10.7 | 612 | 1,027 | 1,044 | 1,068 | 1,140 | 1,254 | 1,386 |
| Labour | Tam Mitchell | 7.4 | 420 | 427 | 632 | 692 | 749 | | |
| Independent | Kristofer Keane | 3.4 | 194 | 202 | 210 | 249 | | | |
| Liberal Democrats | Tom Bryson | 3.3 | 187 | 196 | 209 | | | | |
Electorate: 12,861 Valid: 5,705 Spoilt: 154 Quota: 1,427 Turnout: 45.6%

=== East Kilbride West ===
The SNP and Labour held the seats they won at the previous election while the Conservatives lost their only seat to an independent candidate. In 2017, Cllr David Watson was elected as an SNP candidate but later resigned from the party. He was re-elected as an independent candidate.

East Kilbride West - 3 seats
| Party | Candidate | FPv% | Count | | | | | | | |
| Party | Candidate | FPv% | 1 | 2 | 3 | 4 | 5 | 6 | 7 | 8 |
|---|---|---|---|---|---|---|---|---|---|---|
| Labour | Monique McAdams (incumbent) | 26.5 | 1,780 | | | | | | | |
| Conservative | Ian Harrow (incumbent) | 20.0 | 1,339 | 1,358 | 1,360 | 1,395 | 1,426 | 1,441 | 1,448 | |
| Independent | David Watson (incumbent) | 18.6 | 1,248 | 1,269 | 1,270 | 1,309 | 1,365 | 1,458 | 1,555 | 2,220 |
| SNP | Craig Sloan | 15.5 | 1,041 | 1,048 | 1,049 | 1,053 | 1,068 | | | |
| SNP | Ali Salamati | 15.4 | 1,031 | 1,039 | 1,040 | 1,051 | 1,072 | 1,962 | | |
| Liberal Democrats | Huaiquan Zhang | 2.1 | 142 | 158 | 158 | 166 | | | | |
| Scottish Family | Denise Hay | 1.6 | 110 | 112 | 121 | | | | | |
| UKIP | Yvonne MacKay | 0.3 | 18 | 18 | | | | | | |
Electorate: 13,319 Valid: 6,709 Spoilt: 70 Quota: 1,678 Turnout: 50.9%

=== East Kilbride East ===
The SNP held one of the two seats they won at the previous election while Labour held their only seat and the Greens gained one. Independent candidate Jim Wardhaugh was elected as an SNP candidate in 2017 but later resigned from the party.

East Kilbride East - 3 seats
| Party | Candidate | FPv% | Count | | | | | | |
| Party | Candidate | FPv% | 1 | 2 | 3 | 4 | 5 | 6 | 7 |
|---|---|---|---|---|---|---|---|---|---|
| SNP | Gladys Ferguson-Miller (incumbent) | 28.9 | 1,420 | | | | | | |
| Labour | Graham Scott (incumbent) | 27.0 | 1,329 | | | | | | |
| Conservative | Graeme Mullin | 13.5 | 664 | 665 | 680 | 720 | 803 | 825 | |
| Green | Kirsten Robb | 12.7 | 626 | 647 | 661 | 694 | 790 | 1,149 | 1,291 |
| SNP | Robert Gillies | 8.5 | 420 | 570 | 580 | 590 | 661 | | |
| Independent | Jim Wardhaugh (incumbent) | 6.8 | 336 | 339 | 356 | 382 | | | |
| Liberal Democrats | Lorna Gall | 2.6 | 126 | 129 | 145 | | | | |
Electorate: 10,887 Valid: 4,921 Spoilt: 86 Quota: 1,231 Turnout: 46.0%

=== Rutherglen South ===
The SNP, the Liberal Democrats and Labour held the seats they won at the previous election.

Rutherglen South - 3 seats
| Party | Candidate | FPv% | Count | |
| Party | Candidate | FPv% | 1 | 2 |
|---|---|---|---|---|
| SNP | Carol Nugent (incumbent) | 31.9 | 1,825 | |
| Liberal Democrats | Robert Brown (incumbent) | 29.4 | 1,686 | |
| Labour | Margaret Cowie (incumbent) | 23.2 | 1,331 | 1,436 |
| Conservative | Alexandra Herdman | 8.5 | 489 | 495 |
| Green | Emma Smith | 4.6 | 263 | 436 |
| Scottish Family | Michael O'Hara | 1.3 | 73 | 85 |
| Independent | Spencer Hugh Pryor | 1.1 | 62 | 73 |
Electorate: 11,697 Valid: 5,729 Spoilt: 73 Quota: 1,433 Turnout: 49.6%

=== Rutherglen Central and North ===
The SNP and Labour held the seats they won at the previous election and the SNP gained one seat from the Conservatives.

Rutherglen Central and North - 3 seats
| Party | Candidate | FPv% | Count | | | | | |
| Party | Candidate | FPv% | 1 | 2 | 3 | 4 | 5 | 6 |
|---|---|---|---|---|---|---|---|---|
| Labour | Martin Lennon (incumbent) | 24.5 | 1,245 | 1,270 | | | | |
| SNP | Janine Calikes (incumbent) | 23.4 | 1,188 | 1,265 | 1,338 | | | |
| SNP | Andrea Cowan | 14.3 | 725 | 796 | 840 | 899 | 1,029 | 1,163 |
| Conservative | Libby Fox | 12.0 | 609 | 612 | 730 | 730 | 881 | |
| Labour | Jack McGinty | 10.5 | 531 | 567 | 716 | 717 | | |
| Liberal Democrats | Gloria Adebo | 10.2 | 517 | 544 | | | | |
| Green | Alex McRae | 5.1 | 261 | | | | | |
Electorate: 11,692 Valid: 5,076 Spoilt: 151 Quota: 1,270 Turnout: 44.7%

=== Cambuslang West ===
The SNP and Labour held the seats they won at the previous election and the Liberal Democrats gained one seat from the Conservatives.

Cambuslang West - 3 seats
| Party | Candidate | FPv% | Count | | | | | |
| Party | Candidate | FPv% | 1 | 2 | 3 | 4 | 5 | 6 |
|---|---|---|---|---|---|---|---|---|
| Labour | Margaret Walker (incumbent) | 30.1 | 1,727 | | | | | |
| SNP | John Bradley (incumbent) | 24.1 | 1,382 | 1,404 | 1,491 | | | |
| SNP | Gillian Sutherland | 14.9 | 856 | 882 | 1,000 | 1,049 | 1,066 | |
| Conservative | Ann Le Blond (incumbent) | 12.9 | 739 | 786 | 798 | 798 | | |
| Liberal Democrats | Norman Rae | 12.7 | 730 | 826 | 890 | 893 | 1,416 | 1,802 |
| Green | Tom Lauckner | 5.2 | 301 | 327 | | | | |
Electorate: 12,800 Valid: 5,735 Spoilt: 102 Quota: 1,434 Turnout: 45.6%

=== Cambuslang East ===
The SNP (2) and Labour (1) held the seats they won at the previous election.

Cambuslang East - 3 seats
| Party | Candidate | FPv% | Count | | | | | | |
| Party | Candidate | FPv% | 1 | 2 | 3 | 4 | 5 | 6 | 7 |
|---|---|---|---|---|---|---|---|---|---|
| Labour | Walter Brogan (incumbent) | 29.1 | 1,486 | | | | | | |
| SNP | Alistair Fulton (incumbent) | 22.0 | 1,123 | 1,129 | 1,147 | 1,162 | 1,219 | 1,230 | 1,381 |
| SNP | Katy Loudon (incumbent) | 20.3 | 1,037 | 1,041 | 1,065 | 1,072 | 1,157 | 1,172 | 1,290 |
| Labour | Amy Lee Fraioli | 10.3 | 524 | 688 | 697 | 760 | 808 | 1,046 | |
| Conservative | Jamie Logan | 9.6 | 489 | 497 | 499 | 522 | 539 | | |
| Green | Marie Gallagher | 4.0 | 204 | 207 | 226 | 249 | | | |
| Liberal Democrats | Robert Bell | 2.9 | 147 | 153 | 162 | | | | |
| Alba | Muhammad Khuzaima | 1.8 | 94 | 94 | | | | | |
Electorate: 13,227 Valid: 5,104 Spoilt: 83 Quota: 1,277 Turnout: 39.2%

=== Blantyre ===
Labour (2) and the SNP (1) held the seats they won at the previous election.

Blantyre - 3 seats
| Party | Candidate | FPv% | Count | | | | | |
| Party | Candidate | FPv% | 1 | 2 | 3 | 4 | 5 | 6 |
|---|---|---|---|---|---|---|---|---|
| SNP | Maureen Chalmers (incumbent) | 31.7 | 1,652 | | | | | |
| Labour | Mo Razzaq (incumbent) | 29.2 | 1,519 | | | | | |
| Labour | Bert Thomson (incumbent) | 15.7 | 815 | 826 | 997 | 1,031 | 1,066 | 1,307 |
| SNP | Gerry Chambers | 10.4 | 542 | 855 | 864 | 872 | 972 | 982 |
| Conservative | Calum Nimmo | 7.7 | 399 | 399 | 408 | 427 | 439 | |
| Green | David McClemont | 3.2 | 169 | 179 | 183 | 205 | | |
| Liberal Democrats | Stephen Reid | 2.1 | 110 | 111 | 117 | | | |
Electorate: 12,850 Valid: 5,206 Spoilt: 165 Quota: 1,302 Turnout: 41.8%

=== Bothwell and Uddingston ===
The SNP, Labour and the Conservatives held the seats they won at the previous election.

Bothwell and Uddingston - 3 seats
| Party | Candidate | FPv% | Count | | | | | |
| Party | Candidate | FPv% | 1 | 2 | 3 | 4 | 5 | 6 |
|---|---|---|---|---|---|---|---|---|
| Labour | Maureen Devlin (incumbent) | 30.3 | 1,633 | | | | | |
| Conservative | Kenny McCreary (incumbent) | 27.6 | 1,485 | | | | | |
| SNP | Cal Dempsey | 17.2 | 924 | 947 | 949 | 1,008 | 1,099 | 1,913 |
| SNP | Jim McGuigan (incumbent) | 15.1 | 811 | 844 | 848 | 941 | 994 | |
| Liberal Democrats | Troy Davidson | 5.3 | 285 | 397 | 469 | 539 | | |
| Green | John Stubbs | 4.5 | 243 | 275 | 280 | | | |
Electorate: 10,818 Valid: 5,381 Spoilt: 74 Quota: 1,346 Turnout: 50.4%

=== Hamilton North and East ===
The SNP, Labour and the Conservatives held the seats they won at the previous election.

Hamilton North and East - 3 seats
| Party | Candidate | FPv% | Count | | | | | |
| Party | Candidate | FPv% | 1 | 2 | 3 | 4 | 5 | 6 |
|---|---|---|---|---|---|---|---|---|
| Labour | Davie McLachlan (incumbent) | 32.4 | 1,539 | | | | | |
| SNP | Colin Dewar | 30.3 | 1,442 | | | | | |
| Conservative | Martin Hose (incumbent) | 19.0 | 902 | 965 | 968 | 989 | 1,109 | 1,304 |
| SNP | Phil Sykes | 10.5 | 501 | 552 | 772 | 805 | 876 | |
| Liberal Democrats | Andrew Reynolds | 5.2 | 249 | 348 | 355 | 396 | | |
| Independent | Balarabe Baba | 2.6 | 124 | 150 | 154 | | | |
Electorate: 12,036 Valid: 4,757 Spoilt: 109 Quota: 1,190 Turnout: 40.4%

=== Hamilton West and Earnock ===
The SNP (2) and Labour (1) held the seats they had won at the previous election while the Liberal Democrats gained one seat from the Conservatives. In 2017, Cllr Mark McGeever was elected as a Conservative candidate but he subsequently defected to the Liberal Democrats. He was re-elected as a Liberal Democrat candidate.

Hamilton West and Earnock - 4 seats
| Party | Candidate | FPv% | Count | | | | | | |
| Party | Candidate | FPv% | 1 | 2 | 3 | 4 | 5 | 6 | 7 |
|---|---|---|---|---|---|---|---|---|---|
| SNP | Mary Donnelly (incumbent) | 29.7 | 1,731 | | | | | | |
| Labour | Allan Falconer (incumbent) | 24.1 | 1,404 | | | | | | |
| Conservative | Graham William Fisher | 12.9 | 753 | 761 | 779 | 783 | 785 | 862 | |
| Liberal Democrats | Mark McGeever (incumbent) | 11.9 | 691 | 706 | 715 | 759 | 778 | 989 | 1,440 |
| SNP | Graeme Horne (incumbent) | 11.7 | 680 | 1,140 | 1,150 | 1,263 | | | |
| Labour | Jim Lee | 6.6 | 385 | 391 | 561 | 583 | 606 | | |
| Green | Leonard Gingell | 3.1 | 179 | 221 | 227 | | | | |
Electorate: 15,083 Valid: 5,823 Spoilt: 135 Quota: 1,165 Turnout: 39.5%

=== Hamilton South ===
The SNP held both their seats while Labour held one and gained one from the Conservatives.

Hamilton South - 4 seats
| Party | Candidate | FPv% | Count | |
| Party | Candidate | FPv% | 1 | 2 |
|---|---|---|---|---|
| SNP | John Ross (incumbent) | 26.3 | 1,921 | |
| Labour | Gavin Wylie Keatt | 23.1 | 1,688 | |
| Labour | Celine Handibode | 22.3 | 1,632 | |
| SNP | Helen Toner | 15.1 | 1,105 | 1,525 |
| Conservative | Lynne Nailon (incumbent) | 13.1 | 960 | 967 |
Electorate: 16,516 Valid: 7,306 Spoilt: 193 Quota: 1,462 Turnout: 45.4%

=== Larkhall ===
Labour (2), the SNP (1) and the Conservatives (1) held the seats they won at the previous election. Independent candidate Jackie Burns was elected as a Labour candidate in 2017 but was later expelled from the party.

Larkhall - 4 seats
| Party | Candidate | FPv% | Count | | | | | | | | |
| Party | Candidate | FPv% | 1 | 2 | 3 | 4 | 5 | 6 | 7 | 8 | 9 |
|---|---|---|---|---|---|---|---|---|---|---|---|
| Labour | Andy Carmichael (incumbent) | 25.5 | 1,580 | | | | | | | | |
| Conservative | Richard Nelson (incumbent) | 24.5 | 1,518 | | | | | | | | |
| SNP | Ross Clark | 22.4 | 1,389 | | | | | | | | |
| Independent | Jackie Burns (incumbent) | 10.3 | 639 | 679 | 725 | 732 | 742 | 753 | 796 | 886 | |
| Labour | Lesley McDonald | 7.5 | 463 | 678 | 745 | 752 | 759 | 769 | 831 | 975 | 1,379 |
| SNP | George Sutherland | 6.4 | 399 | 408 | 410 | 532 | 532 | 533 | 549 | | |
| Liberal Democrats | Jake Stevenson | 2.4 | 148 | 157 | 199 | 202 | 211 | 223 | | | |
| Scottish Libertarian | David Laird | 0.6 | 36 | 41 | 44 | 45 | | | | | |
| UKIP | Donald Murdo Mackay | 0.3 | 21 | 25 | 56 | 56 | 63 | | | | |
Electorate: 15,010 Valid: 6,193 Spoilt: 140 Quota: 1,239 Turnout: 42.2%

== Aftermath ==
Despite having again been returned as the largest party, the outgoing SNP administration was replaced by a coalition of Labour, Liberal Democrat and independent councillors, with Conservative support. Labour group leader Joe Fagan and depute group leader Gerry Convery were elected as leader of the council and depute leader of the council respectively. SNP group leader John Ross, who was leader of the council from 2017 until the 2022 election, said the council had been "hijacked by a unionist pact". Outgoing Provost Ian McAllan was replaced by independent councillor Margaret Cooper and Cllr Bert Thomson was elected Depute Provost to fill the vacancy created when former Depute Provost Collette Stevenson stood down following her election as MSP for East Kilbride.

The Labour group were accused of "teaming up with the Tories" by Rutherglen MSP Clare Haughey, whilst Clydesdale MSP Màiri McAllan said the coalition was a "sad day for democracy". The Conservative group admitted they had voted in a unionist manner but denied there was any formal agreement between them and the other unionist parties.

In June 2023, council leader Joe Fagan was suspended for two months for a breach of the councillors' code of conduct after he disclosed confidential information about the potential closure of leisure facilities in 2021 to the local press. He was replaced as council leader on an interim basis by Cllr Convery.

Following the defection of East Kilbride, Strathaven and Lesmahagow MP Lisa Cameron from the SNP to the Conservatives in October 2023, her husband – Cllr Mark Horsham – stood back from his role as business manager within the SNP group before resigning from the party to sit as an independent 10 days later. He did not join the council's independent group with the other independent councillors.

In March 2025, Clydesdale South councillor Ross Lambie defected from the Conservatives to Reform UK - a move which left deputy leader Richard Tice "red-faced" according to The National as he was unable to name the councillor which had defected. Another Conservative Clydesdale councillor, Poppy Corbett, also defected to Reform later that month.

Council leader Joe Fagan was elected as MSP for South Scotland in May 2026. He subsequently resigned as council leader and was replaced in the role by Cllr Maureen Devlin.

=== East Kilbride West by-election ===
In May 2023, East Kilbride West councillor Ali Salamati resigned his seat for work reasons triggering a by-election. The result saw the SNP slip to third place behind the Conservatives as the Labour-led administration gained the seat.

East Kilbride West by-election (6 July 2023) - 1 seat
| Party | Candidate | FPv% | Count | | | | | |
| Party | Candidate | FPv% | 1 | 2 | 3 | 4 | 5 | 6 |
|---|---|---|---|---|---|---|---|---|
| Labour | Kirsty Williams | 40.5 | 1,386 | 1,392 | 1,434 | 1,469 | 1,500 | 1,845 |
| Conservative | Bill Dorrian | 26.4 | 904 | 914 | 919 | 933 | 937 | 965 |
| SNP | Robert Gillies | 22.7 | 778 | 778 | 785 | 806 | 899 | |
| Green | Cameron Eadie | 3.8 | 131 | 131 | 139 | 155 | | |
| Independent | Kristofer Keane | 2.9 | 99 | 112 | 123 | | | |
| Liberal Democrats | Jake Stevenson | 2.4 | 83 | 85 | | | | |
| Scottish Family | Jonathan Jack Richardson | 1.2 | 42 | | | | | |
Electorate: 13,412 Valid: 3,450 Spoilt: 27 Quota: 1,712 Turnout: 25.7%

=== Larkhall by-election ===
In April 2026, Labour councillor Lesley McDonald died following a short illness. A by-election, held on 9 July 2026, was won by Reform candidate Fiona McDermott.

Larkhall by-election (9 July 2026) - 1 seat
| Party | Candidate | FPv% | Count | | | |
| Party | Candidate | FPv% | 1 | 2 | 3 | 4 |
|---|---|---|---|---|---|---|
| Reform | Fiona McDermott | 35.2 | 1,150 | 1,247 | 1,380 | 1,689 |
| SNP | Leigh Payne | 29.9 | 975 | 1,003 | 1,239 | |
| Labour | Chris Roarty | 24.5 | 799 | 897 | | |
| Conservative | Gary Burns | 10.5 | 342 | | | |
Electorate: 15,764 Valid: 3,266 Spoilt: 31 Quota: 1,634 Turnout: 20.9%

=== Avondale and Stonehouse by-election ===
In June 2026, Provost Margaret Cooper died following a lengthy illness. A by-election, held on 17 September, was won by SNP candidate Leigh Payne.

Avondale and Stonehouse by-election (17 September 2026) - 1 seat
| Party | Candidate | FPv% | Count | | | | | | | | |
| Party | Candidate | FPv% | 1 | 2 | 3 | 4 | 5 | 6 | 7 | 8 | 9 |
|---|---|---|---|---|---|---|---|---|---|---|---|
| SNP | Leigh Payne | 27.6 | 1,025 | 1,025 | 1,028 | 1,044 | 1,214 | 1,224 | 1,287 | 1,349 | 1,695 |
| Labour | Hannah Miller | 20.0 | 743 | 743 | 746 | 754 | 756 | 871 | 1,073 | 1,198 | |
| Reform | George Hobbins | 19.6 | 727 | 731 | 735 | 750 | 756 | 832 | 858 | | |
| Conservative | Ade Aibinu | 10.6 | 393 | 397 | 400 | 408 | 412 | | | | |
| Liberal Democrats | David Glennie | 9.6 | 357 | 358 | 361 | 386 | 432 | 533 | | | |
| Green | Michael Grant | 8.2 | 303 | 303 | 314 | 326 | | | | | |
| Independent | Andrew Forde | 2.9 | 107 | 107 | 113 | | | | | | |
| Your Party | Gary Allan | 1.2 | 45 | 46 | | | | | | | |
| ADF | Ken Thomson | 0.3 | 12 | | | | | | | | |
Electorate: 16,077 Valid: 3,712 Spoilt: 19 Quota: 1,857 Turnout: 23.2%
