= Cambuslang East (ward) =

Ward of South Lanarkshire Council

- South Lanarkshire
- Boundary of Cambuslang East in South Lanarkshire from 2007–2017.
- Population: 17,418 (2021)
- Electorate: 13,227 (2022)
- Major settlements: Cambuslang (part of)
- Scottish Parliament constituency: Rutherglen
- Scottish Parliament region: Glasgow
- UK Parliament constituency: Rutherglen

Current ward
- Created: 2007
- Number of councillors: 3
- Councillor: Walter Brogan (Labour)
- Councillor: Katy Loudon (SNP)
- Councillor: Alistair Fulton (SNP)
- Created from: Cairns; Cambuslang Central; Hallside; Long Calderwood

Cambuslang East is one of the 20 electoral wards of South Lanarkshire Council. Created in 2007, the ward elects three councillors using the single transferable vote electoral system and covers an area with a population of 17,418 people.

The ward was previously a Labour stronghold with the party holding at least two of the three seats between 2007 and 2017. However, it has since swung towards the Scottish National Party (SNP) with the party holding two of the three seats since 2017.

== Boundaries ==
The ward was created following the Fourth Statutory Reviews of Electoral Arrangements ahead of the 2007 Scottish local elections. As a result of the Local Governance (Scotland) Act 2004, local elections in Scotland would use the single transferable vote electoral system from 2007 onwards so Cambuslang East was formed from an amalgamation of several previous first-past-the-post wards. It contained the majority of the former Cairns ward, roughly half of the former Cambuslang Central ward as well as all of the former Hallside ward. As a result of amendments to the boundaries of the South Lanarkshire Council's management areas, the boundaries between Rutherglen and Cambuslang, East Kilbride and Hamilton were tweaked so Cambuslang East also contained part of the former Long Calderwood ward.

Most new multi-member wards were formed from at least three smaller predecessors, but the population of Cambuslang in the area now represented by Cambuslang East had increased substantially over the dozen years following the local government reforms in the 1990s due to the construction of the new Drumsagard neighbourhood, with further developments planned for sites including Westfarm, Newton Farm and Gilbertfield – these projects were largely completed over the next decade, increasing the ward's population above that of its neighbours.

Cambuslang East covers a suburban area in the east of Cambuslang including the neighbourhoods of Halfway, Cairns, the Circuit, Drumsagard, Lightburn, Newton and Westburn. The ward's northern boundary is the division with Glasgow City Council which runs along the River Clyde and its eastern boundary is the Rotten Calder.

Prior to the local government reforms in the 1990s, Cambuslang was within the Glasgow District under Strathclyde Regional Council. One of its single-member wards was Halfway which included much of the same area as the current Cambuslang East.

Following the Fifth Statutory Reviews of Electoral Arrangements ahead of the 2017 Scottish local elections, streets between Greenlees Road and the Cathcart Circle Line railway tracks over Hamilton Road were transferred into Cambuslang West.

== Councillors ==
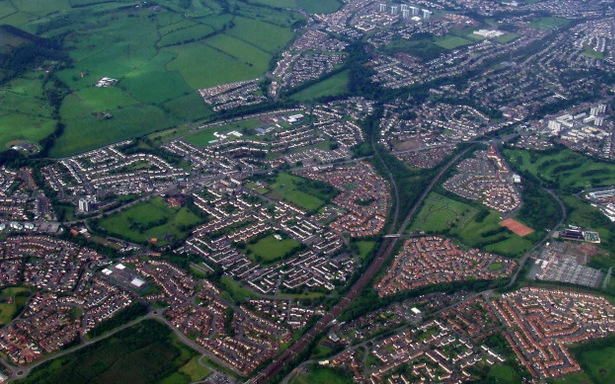
Aerial view of the ward from the north-east

Election	Councillors		
2007	Walter Brogan (Labour)	John Higgins (SNP)	Pam Clearie (Labour)
2008 by-election	Walter Brogan (Labour)	Richard Tullett (Labour)	Pam Clearie (Labour)
2012	Walter Brogan (Labour)	Christine Deanie (SNP)	Pam Clearie (Labour)
2017	Walter Brogan (Labour)	Katy Loudon (SNP)	Alistair Fulton (SNP)
2022	Walter Brogan (Labour)	Katy Loudon (SNP)	Alistair Fulton (SNP)

== Election results ==
=== 2022 election ===
Cambuslang East - 3 seats
Party	Candidate	FPv%	Count						
Party	Candidate	FPv%	1	2	3	4	5	6	7
Labour	Walter Brogan (incumbent)	29.1	1,486						
SNP	Alistair Fulton (incumbent)	22.0	1,123	1,129	1,147	1,162	1,219	1,230	1,381
SNP	Katy Loudon (incumbent)	20.3	1,037	1,041	1,065	1,072	1,157	1,172	1,290
Labour	Amy Lee Fraioli	10.3	524	688	697	760	808	1,046	
Conservative	Jamie Logan	9.6	489	497	499	522	539		
Green	Marie Gallagher	4.0	204	207	226	249			
Liberal Democrats	Robert Bell	2.9	147	153	162				
Alba	Muhammad Khuzaima	1.8	94	94					
Electorate: 13,227 Valid: 5,104 Spoilt: 83 Quota: 1,277 Turnout: 39.2%

=== 2017 election ===
Cambuslang East - 3 seats
Party	Candidate	FPv%	Count							
Party	Candidate	FPv%	1	2	3	4	5	6	7	8
Labour	Walter Brogan (incumbent)	32.8	1,553							
SNP	Katy Loudon	23.7	1,123	1,139	1,145	1,154	1,225			
SNP	Alistair Fulton	18.1	857	876	879	896	923	958	1,019	1,140
Conservative	Gavin Douglas	14.1	668	690	762	792	810	811	902	
Green	Laura Martin	3.1	147	155	162	199				
Labour	Stuart Gallacher (Note: Sitting Councillor for Hamilton South.)	2.8	134	378	394	427	452	453		
Scottish Unionist	James Moore	2.7	129	137						
Liberal Democrats	Ellen Bryson	2.6	125	141	150					
Electorate: 11,505 Valid: 4,736 Spoilt: 108 Quota: 1,185 Turnout: 42.1%

=== 2012 election ===
Cambuslang East - 3 seats
Party	Candidate	FPv%	Count		
Party	Candidate	FPv%	1	2	3
Labour	Walter Brogan (incumbent)	43.0	1,554		
SNP	Christine Deanie	23.4	845	876	925
Labour	Pam Clearie (incumbent)	17.5	631	1,177	
SNP	Alistair Fulton	8.6	311	326	340
Conservative	Alan Fraser	5.3	190	195	211
Liberal Democrats	Lindsay Watt	2.2	80	92	118
Electorate: 11,090 Valid: 3,611 Spoilt: 103 Quota: 903 Turnout: 32.6%

=== 2008 by-election ===
Cambuslang East by-election (6 March 2008) - 1 seat
Party	Candidate	FPv%	Count							
Party	Candidate	FPv%	1	2	3	4	5	6	7	8
Labour	Richard Tullett	28.0	725	729	739	742	747	922	1,094	1,475
SNP	Christine Deanie	23.5	609	614	621	625	638	728	962	
Liberal Democrats	Tunweer Malik	22.4	580	584	589	593	616	669		
Independent	John McGuinness	19.6	509	510	517	521	538			
Conservative	Malcolm Macaskill	3.1	80	82	82	94				
Scottish Unionist	Jimi Moore	1.5	38	39	40					
Scottish Socialist	David McClemont	1.2	32	35						
Green	Susan Martin	0.8	21							
Electorate: 10,397 Valid: 2,044 Spoilt: 38 Quota: 1,298 Turnout: 25.0%

=== 2007 election ===
Cambuslang East - 3 seats
Party	Candidate	FPv%	Count			
Party	Candidate	FPv%	1	2	3	4
Labour	Walter Brogan	32.4	1,544			
SNP	John Higgins (Note: Cambuslang East councillor John Higgins died on 29 December 2007. A by-election, held on 6 March 2008, was won by Labour's Richard Tullett.)	23.5	1,120	1,139	1,181	1,267
Labour	Pam Clearie (Note: Returning councillor for Cairns single-member ward.)	18.0	859	1,117	1,152	1,224
Liberal Democrats	Tunweer Malik	14.3	684	696	716	845
Conservative	Louise Ann Campbell	8.9	423	428	437	
Scottish Socialist	David Stevenson	2.9	137	146		
Electorate: 10,394 Valid: 4,767 Quota: 1,192 Turnout: 46.9%
