= Avondale and Stonehouse (ward) =

Electoral ward in South Lanarkshire, Scotland

- South Lanarkshire
- Boundary of Avondale and Stonehouse in South Lanarkshire from 2007–2017.
- Population: 17,749 (2021)
- Electorate: 16,077 (2026)
- Major settlements: Strathaven; Stonehouse
- Scottish Parliament constituency: Clydesdale; Hamilton, Larkhall and Stonehouse
- Scottish Parliament region: South Scotland
- UK Parliament constituency: East Kilbride and Strathaven

Current ward
- Created: 2007
- Number of councillors: 3
- Councillor: Elise Frame (SNP)
- Councillor: Susan Kerr (Labour)
- Councillor: Leigh Payne (SNP)
- Created from: Avondale North; Avondale South; Larkhall South; Lindsay

Avondale and Stonehouse is one of the 20 electoral wards of South Lanarkshire Council. Created in 2007, the ward initially elected four councillors using the single transferable vote electoral system before a boundary review in 2017 reduced the number of councillors to three. It covers an area with a population of 17,749 people.

The ward has produced strong results for both Labour and the Scottish National Party (SNP). Prior to the boundary review, the SNP held half the seats in the ward and both parties have returned at least one member at every election.

== Boundaries ==
The ward was created following the Fourth Statutory Reviews of Electoral Arrangements ahead of the 2007 Scottish local elections. As a result of the Local Governance (Scotland) Act 2004, local elections in Scotland would use the single transferable vote electoral system from 2007 onwards so Avondale and Stonehouse was formed from an amalgamation of several previous first-past-the-post wards. It contained the majority of the former Lindsay ward and part of the former Larkhall South ward as well as all of the former Avondale North and Avondale South wards. Avondale and Stonehouse is located in the west of South Lanarkshire and covers a rural hinterland next to its boundaries with East Ayrshire and East Renfrewshire. The ward centres around the towns of Strathaven and Stonehouse as well the villages of Chapelton and Glassford. Following the Fifth Statutory Reviews of Electoral Arrangements ahead of the 2017 Scottish local elections, the ward's boundaries were altered to remove a corridor of farmland between the White Cart Water and southern East Kilbride. The review resulted in a reduction in the number of seats from four to three in order to balance with other wards with similar populations.

== Councillors ==
Year	Councillors			
2007	James Malloy (Labour)	Graeme Campbell (Conservative /Independent/ Conservative)	Lynn Filshie (Independent)	William Holman (SNP)
2012	Margaret Cooper (Labour /Independent)	Graeme Campbell (Conservative /Independent/ Conservative)	Isobel Dorman (SNP)	William Holman (SNP)
2017	Margaret Cooper (Labour /Independent)	Graeme Campbell (Conservative /Independent/ Conservative)	Isobel Dorman (SNP)	
2017	Margaret Cooper (Labour /Independent)	Graeme Campbell (Conservative /Independent/ Conservative)	Isobel Dorman (SNP)	
2022	Margaret Cooper (Labour /Independent)	Susan Kerr (Labour)	Elise Frame (SNP)	
2026	Leigh Payne (SNP)	Susan Kerr (Labour)	Elise Frame (SNP)	

== Election results ==
=== 2026 by-election ===
Avondale and Stonehouse by-election (17 September 2026) - 1 seat
Party	Candidate	FPv%	Count								
Party	Candidate	FPv%	1	2	3	4	5	6	7	8	9
SNP	Leigh Payne	27.6	1,025	1,025	1,028	1,044	1,214	1,224	1,287	1,349	1,695
Labour	Hannah Miller	20.0	743	743	746	754	756	871	1,073	1,198	
Reform	George Hobbins	19.6	727	731	735	750	756	832	858		
Conservative	Ade Aibinu	10.6	393	397	400	408	412				
Liberal Democrats	David Glennie	9.6	357	358	361	386	432	533			
Green	Michael Grant	8.2	303	303	314	326					
Independent	Andrew Forde	2.9	107	107	113						
Your Party	Gary Allan	1.2	45	46							
ADF	Ken Thomson	0.3	12								
Electorate: 16,077 Valid: 3,712 Spoilt: 19 Quota: 1,857 Turnout: 23.2%

=== 2022 election ===
Avondale and Stonehouse - 3 seats
Party	Candidate	FPv%	Count						
Party	Candidate	FPv%	1	2	3	4	5	6	7
Independent	Margaret Cooper (incumbent)	23.7	1,629	1,639	1,740				
SNP	Elise Frame	21.2	1,454	1,471	1,632	1,635	2,122		
Conservative	Gary Burns	20.6	1,416	1,420	1,440	1,445	1,452	1,462	
Labour	Susan Kerr	19.8	1,363	1,367	1,439	1,444	1,480	1,619	2,290
SNP	Leigh Payne	7.2	495	515	566	567			
Green	Erica Bradley-Young	6.4	437	444					
Alba	Colin MacLaren	1.1	75						
Electorate: 14,882 Valid: 6,869 Spoilt: 93 Quota: 1,718 Turnout: 46.8%

=== 2017 election ===
Avondale and Stonehouse - 3 seats
Party	Candidate	FPv%	Count							
Party	Candidate	FPv%	1	2	3	4	5	6	7	8
Conservative	Graeme Campbell (incumbent)	31.5	2,062							
Labour	Margaret Cooper (incumbent) (Note: Avondale and Stonehouse Labour councillor Margaret Cooper resigned from the party and became an independent in May 2017.)	23.5	1,540	1,656						
SNP	Isobel Dorman (incumbent)	17.1	1,121	1,131	1,134	1,137	1,147	1,187	1,309	2,279
SNP	Mairi Tulbure	13.4	877	882	883	884	893	967	1,111	
Independent	Alister Hendry	8.9	580	665	669	695	739	801		
Green	Erica Young	3.0	193	203	204	211	273			
Liberal Democrats	Daniel O'Malley	1.9	122	170	173	181				
UKIP	Laura Murray	0.8	51	82	83					
Electorate: 13,114 Valid: 6,546 Spoilt: 90 Quota: 1,637 Turnout: 50.6%

=== 2012 election ===
Avondale and Stonehouse - 4 seats
Party	Candidate	FPv%	Count										
Party	Candidate	FPv%	1	2	3	4	5	6	7	8	9	10	11
SNP	Isobel Dorman	21.4	1,148										
SNP	William Holman (incumbent)	16.1	866	923	932	950	993	1,061	1,163				
Labour	Margaret Cooper	12.5	670	673	674	685	698	732	759	764	1,159		
Conservative	Allan Finnie	11.6	624	625	635	642	650	667	719	725	735	740	
Independent	Graeme Campbell (incumbent)	9.4	502	503	505	516	525	581	808	824	853	862	1,100
Labour	John Hamilton	9.2	494	495	495	499	522	565	589	597			
Independent	Lynn Filshie (incumbent)	7.6	409	412	412	429	460	555					
Independent	Jim Malloy (incumbent)	6.3	339	340	340	357	381						
Green	Erica Young	3.4	181	183	185	189							
Independent	Kenny Weir	1.8	94	96	99								
UKIP	Melvyn Donald Randall	0.7	37	37									
Electorate: 12,848 Valid: 5,364 Spoilt: 97 Quota: 1,073 Turnout: 41.8%

=== 2007 election ===
Avondale and Stonehouse - 4 seats
Party	Candidate	FPv%	Count							
Party	Candidate	FPv%	1	2	3	4	5	6	7	8
SNP	William Holman	27.6	1,989							
Conservative	Graeme Campbell	19.2	1,384	1,450						
Labour	James Malloy (Note: Returning councillor for Avondale North single-member ward.)	14.9	1,071	1,127	1,128	1,140	1,155	1,226	1,356	???
Independent	Lynn Filshie	11.1	797	858	860	975	1,127	1,205	1,348	???
Labour	Ian McInnes	10.9	788	816	816	824	830	867	922	
Liberal Democrats	Nigel Benzies	5.7	414	496	498	511	536	646		
Green	John Innes	4.6	333	406	406	416	449			
Independent	Stuart Brown	3.3	238	266	267	304				
Independent	Frank Reilly	2.7	198	217	218					
Electorate: 13,144 Valid: 6,912 Quota: 1,443 Turnout: 55.7%
