= Hamilton South (ward) =

Electoral division of South Lanarkshire, Scotland

- South Lanarkshire
- Boundary of Hamilton South in South Lanarkshire from 2007–2017.
- Population: 22,032 (2020)
- Electorate: 16,516 (2022)
- Major settlements: Hamilton (part of)
- Scottish Parliament constituency: Hamilton, Larkhall and Stonehouse
- Scottish Parliament region: Central Scotland
- UK Parliament constituency: Hamilton and Clyde Valley

Current ward
- Created: 2007
- Number of councillors: 4
- Councillor: John Ross (SNP)
- Councillor: Gavin Wylie Keatt (Labour)
- Councillor: Celine Handibode (Labour)
- Councillor: Helen Toner (SNP)
- Created from: Cadzow; Hamilton Centre/Ferniegair; Hamilton Centre North; Low Waters; Silvertonhill; Woodhead/Meikle Earnock

Hamilton South is one of the 20 electoral wards of South Lanarkshire Council. Created in 2007, the ward elects four councillors using the single transferable vote electoral system and covers an area with a population of 22,032 people.

The ward has produced strong results for both the Scottish National Party (SNP) – who won half the seats at the 2012, 2017 and 2022 elections – and Labour who won half the seats at the 2007, 2012 and 2022 elections. Following a by-election win in 2013, Labour held three of the four seats.

== Boundaries ==
The ward was created following the Fourth Statutory Reviews of Electoral Arrangements ahead of the 2007 Scottish local elections. As a result of the Local Governance (Scotland) Act 2004, local elections in Scotland would use the single transferable vote electoral system from 2007 onwards so Hamilton South was formed from an amalgamation of several previous first-past-the-post wards. It contained all of the former Low Waters and Silvertonhill wards as well as part of the former Cadzow and Woodhead/Meikle Earnock wards and a small part of the former Hamilton Centre/Ferniegair and Hamilton Centre North wards. Hamilton South covers the southern part of Hamilton including the Avon Grove, Cadzow, Eddlewood, Fairhill, Laighstonehall, Low Waters, Meikle Earnock, Silvertonhill, Torhead Farm and Woodhead neighbourhoods. Following the Fifth Statutory Reviews of Electoral Arrangements ahead of the 2017 Scottish local elections, streets around Portland Place, Burnblea Street and Kemp Street were added to the ward from Hamilton North and East which resulted in the ward's northeastern boundary moving to the Argyle Line railway tracks.

== Councillors ==
Year	Councillors			
2007	Joe Lowe (Labour/Independent)	Brian McCaig (Labour)	Bobby Lawson (SNP)	John Murray (Conservative)
2012	Joe Lowe (Labour/Independent)	Brian McCaig (Labour)	Bobby Lawson (SNP)	Angela Crawley (SNP)
2013 by-election	Joe Lowe (Labour/Independent)	Brian McCaig (Labour)	Stuart Gallacher (Labour)	Angela Crawley (SNP)
2015 by-election	Joe Lowe (Labour/Independent)	Brian McCaig (Labour)	Stuart Gallacher (Labour)	John Ross (SNP)
2017	Joe Lowe (Labour/Independent)	Lynne Mailon (Conservative)	Josh Wilson (SNP)	John Ross (SNP)
2017	Joe Lowe (Labour/Independent)	Lynne Mailon (Conservative)	Josh Wilson (SNP)	John Ross (SNP)
2022	Gavin Wylie Keatt (Labour)	Celine Handibode (Labour)	Helen Toner (SNP)	John Ross (SNP)

== Election results ==
=== 2022 election ===
Hamilton South - 4 seats
Party	Candidate	FPv%	Count	
Party	Candidate	FPv%	1	2
SNP	John Ross (incumbent)	26.3	1,921	
Labour	Gavin Wylie Keatt	23.1	1,688	
Labour	Celine Handibode	22.3	1,632	
SNP	Helen Toner	15.1	1,105	1,525
Conservative	Lynne Nailon (incumbent)	13.1	960	967
Electorate: 16,516 Valid: 7,306 Spoilt: 193 Quota: 1,462 Turnout: 45.4%

=== 2017 election ===
Hamilton South - 4 seats
Party	Candidate	FPv%	Count						
Party	Candidate	FPv%	1	2	3	4	5	6	7
SNP	John Ross (incumbent)	30.6	2,167						
Labour	Joe Lowe (incumbent) (Note: Hamilton South Labour councillor and Joe Lowe resigned from the party and became an independent in May 2017.)	25.7	1,818						
Conservative	Lynne Nailon	21.8	1,544						
Labour	Brian McCaig (incumbent)	9.1	643	669	991	1,020	1,055	1,177	
SNP	Josh Wilson	6.7	475	1,105	1,112	1,115	1,209	1,245	1,485
Scottish Green	John Kane	3.0	216	249	257	265			
Liberal Democrats	Joanne Ferguson	3.0	210	228	244	282	345		
Electorate: 16,328 Valid: 7,073 Spoilt: 177 Quota: 1,415 Turnout: 44.4%

=== 2015 by-election ===
Hamilton South by-election (6 August 2015)- 1 seat
Party	Candidate	FPv%	Count					
Party	Candidate	FPv%	1	2	3	4	5	6
SNP	John Ross	48.0	1,881	1,883	1,888	1,905	1919	1,988
Labour	Jim Lee	35.6	1,396	1,398	1,405	1,410	1,425	1,460
Conservative	Lynne Nailon	8.9	349	349	354	365	389	394
Scottish Green	John Kane	3.2	127	128	132	135	146	
Scottish Christian	Craig Smith	2.0	77	80	81	84		
UKIP	Donald Murdo MacKay	1.1	43	44	45			
Liberal Democrats	Matthew Cockburn	0.8	32	34				
Pirate	Andrew McCallum	0.3	13					
Electorate: 14,811 Valid: 3,918 Spoilt: 52 Quota: 1,960 Turnout: 26.8%

=== 2013 by-election ===
Hamilton South by-election (24 October 2013) - 1 seat
Party	Candidate	FPv%	Count
Party	Candidate	FPv%	1
Labour	Stuart Gallacher	51.7	1,781
SNP	Josh Wilson	32.5	1,120
Conservative	Lynne Nailon	9.4	322
Scottish Christian	Craig Martin	3.9	133
UKIP	Josh Richardson	2.5	86
Electorate: 14,478 Valid: 3,442 Spoilt: 43 Quota: 1,722 Turnout: 24.1%

=== 2012 election ===
Hamilton South - 4 seats
Party	Candidate	FPv%	Count						
Party	Candidate	FPv%	1	2	3	4	5	6	7
Labour	Joe Lowe (incumbent)	36.6	1,975						
SNP	Angela Crawley (Note: Hamilton South SNP councillor Angela Crawley was elected as MP for Lanark and Hamilton East on 7 May 2015. She resigned her council seat on 22 May 2015. A by-election was held on 6 August 2015 and was won by the SNP's John Ross.)	23.2	1,255						
Labour	Brian McCaig (incumbent)	14.8	800	1,512					
SNP	Bobby Lawson (incumbent) (Note: Hamilton South SNP councillor Bobby Lawson died on 13 August 2013. A by-election was held on 24 October 2013 and was won by Labour's Stuart Gallacher.)	9.3	502	537	599	747	773	861	988
Conservative	John Murray (incumbent)	9.2	496	516	542	545	584	654	
Scottish Senior Citizens	David Holland	3.7	199	234	314	324	380		
Scottish Christian	Craig Smith	3.1	165	176	198	200			
Electorate: 14,383 Valid: 5,392 Spoilt: 134 Quota: 1,079 Turnout: 37.5%

=== 2007 election ===
Hamilton South - 4 seats
Party	Candidate	FPv%	Count							
Party	Candidate	FPv%	1	2	3	4	5	6	7	8
Labour	Joe Lowe (Note: Returning councillor for Low Waters single-member ward.)	34.9	2,626							
SNP	Bobby Lawson	23.8	1,791							
Labour	Brian McCaig (Note: Returning councillor for Silvertonhill single-member ward.)	13.4	1,005	1,685						
Conservative	John Murray	10.7	808	837	872	883	906	942	1,121	???
Independent	John Carracher	6.2	464	531	564	584	611	740	876	
Liberal Democrats	John Oswald	5.7	427	459	509	532	633	664		
Independent	David Holland	2.9	215	255	276	283	300			
Scottish Green	Denize McBride	2.5	188	219	265	276				
Electorate: 15,037 Valid: 7,524 Quota: 1,505 Turnout: 51.0%
