= East Kilbride East (ward) =

Electoral ward in South Lanarkshire, Scotland

- South Lanarkshire
- Boundary of East Kilbride East in South Lanarkshire from 2007–2017.
- Population: 15,275 (2021)
- Electorate: 10,887 (2022)
- Major settlements: East Kilbride (part of)
- Scottish Parliament constituency: East Kilbride
- Scottish Parliament region: Central Scotland
- UK Parliament constituency: East Kilbride and Strathaven

Current ward
- Created: 2007
- Number of councillors: 3
- Councillor: Gladys Ferguson-Miller (SNP)
- Councillor: Graham Scott (Labour)
- Councillor: Kirsten Robb (Green)
- Created from: Cairns; Calderglen; Long Calderwood; Morrishall

East Kilbride East is one of the 20 electoral wards of South Lanarkshire Council. Created in 2007, the ward elects three councillors using the single transferable vote electoral system and covers an area with a population of 15,275 people.

The ward has produced strong results for both Labour and the Scottish National Party (SNP) with the former holding two of the three seats from 2007 to 2012 and the latter holding two between 2012 and 2017. It is the only ward in South Lanarkshire to have returned a Green councillor.

== Boundaries ==
The ward was created following the Fourth Statutory Reviews of Electoral Arrangements ahead of the 2007 Scottish local elections. As a result of the Local Governance (Scotland) Act 2004, local elections in Scotland would use the single transferable vote electoral system from 2007 onwards so East Kilbride East was formed from an amalgamation of several previous first-past-the-post wards. It contained the vast majority of the former Calderglen and Long Calderwood wards as well as all of the former Morrishall ward. As a result of amendments to the boundaries of the South Lanarkshire Council's management areas, the boundaries between Rutherglen and Cambuslang, East Kilbride and Hamilton were tweaked so East Kilbride East also contained part of the former Cairns ward. East Kilbride East covers the parts of East Kilbride on the north-east and eastern peripheries of the town, primarily Calderwood (excepting the Maxwellton/west of Calderwood Road area), as well as Brancumhall, part of St Leonards (east of High Common Road), Nerston (the separate hamlet, but not the brownfield residential developments south of Kingsgate) and the Crutherland development fringing Calderglen Country Park. Following the Fifth Statutory Reviews of Electoral Arrangements ahead of the 2017 Scottish local elections, streets between Calderwood Road, Morrishall Road and Hunter Primary School were transferred into the ward from East Kilbride Central North.

== Councillors ==
Year	Councillors		
2007	John Cairney (Labour)	Graham Scott (Labour)	Jim Wardhaugh (SNP/Independent)
2012	John Cairney (Labour)	Gladys Miller (SNP)	Jim Wardhaugh (SNP/Independent)
2017	Graham Scott (Labour)	Gladys Miller (SNP)	Jim Wardhaugh (SNP/Independent)
2017	Graham Scott (Labour)	Gladys Miller (SNP)	Jim Wardhaugh (SNP/Independent)
2022	Graham Scott (Labour)	Gladys Miller (SNP)	Kirsten Robb (Green)

== Election results ==
=== 2022 election ===
East Kilbride East - 3 seats
Party	Candidate	FPv%	Count						
Party	Candidate	FPv%	1	2	3	4	5	6	7
SNP	Gladys Ferguson-Miller (incumbent)	28.9	1,420						
Labour	Graham Scott (incumbent)	27.0	1,329						
Conservative	Graeme Mullin	13.5	664	665	680	720	803	825	
Green	Kirsten Robb	12.7	626	647	661	694	790	1,149	1,291
SNP	Robert Gillies	8.5	420	570	580	590	661		
Independent	Jim Wardhaugh (incumbent)	6.8	336	339	356	382			
Liberal Democrats	Lorna Gall	2.6	126	129	145				
Electorate: 10,887 Valid: 4,921 Spoilt: 86 Quota: 1,231 Turnout: 46.0%

=== 2017 Election ===
East Kilbride East - 3 seats
Party	Candidate	FPv%	Count							
Party	Candidate	FPv%	1	2	3	4	5	6	7	8
SNP	Gladys Miller (incumbent)	27.1	1,374							
Labour	Graham Scott	25.9	1,314							
Conservative	Isabel Perratt	18.0	911	912	920	939	981	1,030	1,078	
SNP	Jim Wardhaugh (incumbent) (Note: East Kilbride East SNP councillor Jim Wardhaugh resigned from the party and became an independent on 25 May 2017.)	15.3	773	857	862	867	873	902	1,101	1,306
Green	Kirsten Robb	7.2	366	378	384	392	418	464		
Independent	John Cairney (incumbent)	3.3	166	167	172	179	193			
Liberal Democrats	Lorna Gall	2.2	109	111	117	122				
UKIP	Brian Doolan	1.1	55	55	56					
Electorate: 11,025 Valid: 5,068 Spoilt: 81 Quota: 1,268 Turnout: 46.7%

=== 2012 Election ===
East Kilbride East - 3 seats
Party	Candidate	FPv%	Count				
Party	Candidate	FPv%	1	2	3	4	5
Labour	John Cairney (incumbent)	27.4	1,037				
SNP	Jim Wardhaugh (incumbent)	22.5	853	855	867	913	1,031
SNP	Gladys Miller	21.0	795	798	819	863	977
Labour	Graham Scott (incumbent)	17.7	671	746	766	837	
Conservative	Ian Harrow	8.5	321	323	357		
Liberal Democrats	Nigel Benzies	3.0	112	113			
Electorate: 9,622 Valid: 3,789 Spoilt: 72 Quota: 948 Turnout: 39.4%

=== 2007 Election ===
East Kilbride East - 3 seats
Party	Candidate	FPv%	Count							
Party	Candidate	FPv%	1	2	3	4	5	6	7	8
SNP	Jim Wardhaugh	36.2	1,896							
Labour	John Cairney	27.0	1,414							
Labour	Graham Scott (Note: Returning councillor for Westwoodhill single-member ward.)	12.2	639	708	779	802	833	883	1,033	???
Conservative	Ian Harrow	9.4	493	551	554	570	596	625	747	
Liberal Democrats	Mark Watson	5.2	271	376	381	397	436	565		
Green	Andrew Williamson	4.0	210	325	329	359	426			
East Kilbride Alliance	Richard Naismith	3.6	189	236	238	264				
Independent	John Doyle	2.3	122	160	163					
Electorate: 9,765 Valid: 5,234 Quota: 1,309 Turnout: 54.6%
