= 2017 South Lanarkshire Council election =

South Lanarkshire Council election

- 4 May 2017

All 64 seats to South Lanarkshire Council 33 seats needed for a majority
- Registered: 249,536
- Turnout: 46.7%
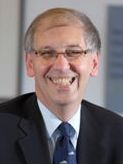
	First party	Second party
	SNP	Lab
Leader	John Ross	Gerry Convery
Party	SNP	Labour
Leader's seat	Hamilton South	East Kilbride Central South
Last election	28 seats, 36.4%	33 seats, 43.2%
Seats won	27	22
Seat change	▼1	▼11
Popular vote	40,786	33,154
Percentage	35.7%	29.0%
Swing	▼0.7%	▼14.2%
	Third party	Fourth party
	Con
Leader	Alex Allison	Robert Brown
Party	Conservative	Liberal Democrats
Leader's seat	Clydesdale East	Rutherglen South
Last election	3 seats, 10.8%	1 seat, 2.8%
Seats won	14	1
Seat change	▲11	Steady
Popular vote	27,377	5,873
Percentage	23.9%	5.1%
Swing	▲13.1%	▲2.3%
Council Leader before election
Edward McAvoy
Labour
Council Leader after election
John Ross
(SNP)
No overall control

Elections to South Lanarkshire Council took place on 4 May 2017 on the same day as the 31 other Scottish local government elections. As with other Scottish council elections, it was held using single transferable vote (STV) – a form of proportional representation – in which multiple candidates are elected in each ward and voters rank candidates in order of preference.

For the first time in a South Lanarkshire election, the Scottish National Party (SNP) were returned with the most seats at 27 despite losing one seat from the previous election. Labour lost significant ground as they lost one-third of their seats and fell from the largest party – one seat away from an overall majority – to second with 22 councillors. The Conservatives recorded their best-ever result in a South Lanarkshire election as they won 14 seats – up from just three in 2017. The remaining seat was won by the Liberal Democrats.

Following the election, the SNP attempted to form a coalition with Labour and the Liberal Democrats but were unsuccessful. The SNP then formed a minority administration.

== Result ==
2017 South Lanarkshire Council election result
Party	Seats	Gains	Losses	Net gain/loss	Seats %	Votes %	Votes	+/−
SNP	27	0	1	▼1	42.2	35.7	40,786	▼0.7
Labour	22	0	11	▼11	34.4	29.0	33,154	▼14.2
Conservative	14	11	0	▲11	21.9	23.9	27,369	▲13.1
Liberal Democrats	1	0	0	Steady	1.6	5.1	5,873	▲2.4
Green	0	0	0	Steady	0.0	3.0	3,372	▲1.5
Independent	0	0	2	▼2	0.0	2.5	2,844	▼0.5
UKIP	0	0	0	Steady	0.0	0.4	457	▼0.2
Solidarity	0	0	0	Steady	0.0	0.3	308	▲0.1
Scottish Unionist	0	0	0	Steady	0.0	0.1	129	▼0.2
Scottish Socialist	0	0	0	Steady	0.0	0.04	48	New
Total	64						114,340	

Notes:

- "Votes" are the first preference votes. The net gain/loss and percentage changes relate to the result of the previous Scottish local elections on 3 May 2012. This may differ from other published sources showing gain/loss relative to seats held at dissolution of Scotland's councils.
- Due to boundary changes, the total number of seats was reduced from 67 to 64.

== Ward results ==
=== Clydesdale West ===
Labour held both the seats they had won at the previous election while the SNP held one of their two seats and the Conservatives gained one seat

Clydesdale West - 4 seats
Party	Candidate	FPv%	Count							
Party	Candidate	FPv%	1	2	3	4	5	6	7	8
Conservative	Poppy Corbett	31.2	2,264							
SNP	David Shearer (incumbent)	22.2	1,611							
Labour	Eileen Logan (incumbent)	21.6	1,566							
Labour	Lynsey Hamilton (incumbent)	11.6	839	1,049	1,055	1,133	1,160	1,192	1,322	1,616
SNP	Chris Travis	8.4	610	627	763	770	784	831	867	
Liberal Democrats	Peter Charles Meehan	2.0	148	314	316	323	335	372		
Green	Mandy Meikle	1.6	118	147	152	154	172			
Solidarity	Pat Lee (incumbent)	1.2	90	107	110	112				
Electorate: 15,183 Valid: 7,246 Spoilt: 133 Quota: 1,450 Turnout: 48.6%

=== Clydesdale North ===
Labour and the SNP held the seats they had won at the previous election while the Conservatives gained a seat from independent Ed Archer.

Clydesdale North - 3 seats
Party	Candidate	FPv%	Count
Party	Candidate	FPv%	1
Conservative	Richard Eliott-Lockhart	28.2	1,725
SNP	Julia Marrs	26.9	1,643
Labour	Catherine McClymont (incumbent)	26.8	1,638
Independent	Ed Archer (incumbent)	11.1	678
Independent	Ronald Logan	3.6	221
Green	Ryan Doherty	2.0	119
Liberal Democrats	Richard Mills	1.5	91
Electorate: 12,002 Valid: 6,115 Spoilt: 54 Quota: 1,529 Turnout: 51.4%

=== Clydesdale East ===
The SNP held the seat they had won at the previous election while the Conservatives held one seat and gained one seat from Labour.

Clydesdale East - 3 seats
Party	Candidate	FPv%	Count							
Party	Candidate	FPv%	1	2	3	4	5	6	7	8
Conservative	Alex Allison	35.5	1,927							
SNP	Ian Donald McAllan	25.7	1,393							
Labour	George Hannah	10.9	592	609	613	634	678	802	984	
Conservative	Eric Holford	9.7	526	959	960	967	992	1,021	1,136	1,386
Independent	Rev. Bev Gauld (incumbent)	8.6	469	508	511	539	560	617		
Green	Janet Moxley	4.9	268	277	293	324	376			
Liberal Democrats	Mark Gordon	2.7	144	160	162	170				
Independent	Andrew McCallum	2.1	112	121	123					
Electorate: 10,165 Valid: 5,431 Spoilt: 109 Quota: 1,358 Turnout: 54.5%

=== Clydesdale South ===
The SNP held the seat they had won at the previous election while Labour held one of their two seats and lost one to the Conservatives.

Clydesdale South - 3 seats
Party	Candidate	FPv%	Count							
Party	Candidate	FPv%	1	2	3	4	5	6	7	8
Conservative	Colin McGavigan (Note: On 29 June 2020, Clydesdale South Conservative councillor Colin McGavigan was suspended from the party over "totally unacceptable and offensive" Facebook posts in relation to the Black Lives Matter protests. On 16 February 2021, Cllr McGavigan resigned from the party and became an independent.)	22.0	1,198	1,221	1,243	1,260	1,314	1,324	1,333	1,411
Labour	George Greenshields (incumbent) (Note: In 2018, Clydesdale South Labour councillor George Greenshields resigned from the party and became an independent.)	18.9	1,031	1,038	1,050	1,076	1,206	1,229	1,280	1,992
SNP	Mark Horsham	16.0	874	875	884	915	948	1,652		
Labour	Gordon Muir (incumbent)	15.9	866	868	880	898	983	1,022	1,053	
SNP	Sandra Mills	13.9	757	759	761	801	835			
Independent	Danny Meikle	7.8	425	428	434	443				
Green	Craig Dalzell	2.6	139	148	174					
Liberal Democrats	Kaitey Blair	1.8	97	101						
UKIP	Janice MacKay	1.2	65							
Electorate: 11,568 Valid: 5,452 Spoilt: 89 Quota: 1,364 Turnout: 47.9%

=== Avondale and Stonehouse ===
Following the Fifth Statutory Reviews of Electoral Arrangements, Avondale and Stonehouse was reduced in size from a four-member ward to a three-member ward. The SNP retained one of the two seats they had won at the previous election while Labour retained their only seat. Incumbent and former independent councillor Graeme Campbell held his seat but was elected as a Conservative councillor.

Avondale and Stonehouse - 3 seats
Party	Candidate	FPv%	Count							
Party	Candidate	FPv%	1	2	3	4	5	6	7	8
Conservative	Graeme Campbell (incumbent)	31.5	2,062							
Labour	Margaret Cooper (incumbent) (Note: Avondale and Stonehouse Labour councillor Margaret Cooper resigned from the party and became an independent in May 2017.)	23.5	1,540	1,656						
SNP	Isobel Dorman (incumbent)	17.1	1,121	1,131	1,134	1,137	1,147	1,187	1,309	2,279
SNP	Mairi Tulbure	13.4	877	882	883	884	893	967	1,111	
Independent	Alister Hendry	8.9	580	665	669	695	739	801		
Green	Erica Young	3.0	193	203	204	211	273			
Liberal Democrats	Daniel O'Malley	1.9	122	170	173	181				
UKIP	Laura Murray	0.8	51	82	83					
Electorate: 13,114 Valid: 6,546 Spoilt: 90 Quota: 1,637 Turnout: 50.6%

=== East Kilbride South ===
The SNP (2) and Labour (1) retained the seats they had won at the previous election.

East Kilbride South - 3 seats
Party	Candidate	FPv%	Count						
Party	Candidate	FPv%	1	2	3	4	5	6	7
SNP	Archie Buchanan (incumbent)	40.5	2,119						
Labour	Fiona Dryburgh (Note: On 12 August 2019, East Kilbride South Labour councillor Fiona Dryburgh resigned from the party and joined the Liberal Democrats in opposition to Labour voicing support for a second Scottish independence referendum.)	19.7	1,030	1,104	1,109	1,122	1,145	1,303	1,327
Conservative	Alexandra Herdman	14.8	773	779	801	806	812	949	952
SNP	Geri Gray	10.9	572	1,196	1,205	1,233	1,293	1,380	
Liberal Democrats	Paul McGarry	9.7	506	526	531	540	552		
Green	Ruth Thomas	2.0	104	127	129	145			
Solidarity	John Park	1.4	73	82	86				
UKIP	Conner Campbell	1.0	50	59					
Electorate: 12,335 Valid: 5,227 Spoilt: 114 Quota: 1,307 Turnout: 43.3%

=== East Kilbride Central South ===
The SNP held the seat they had won at the previous election and gained one from Labour while Labour held one of their two seats.

East Kilbride Central South - 3 seats
Party	Candidate	FPv%	Count						
Party	Candidate	FPv%	1	2	3	4	5	6	7
SNP	John Anderson (incumbent)	31.4	1,705						
Labour	Gerry Convery (incumbent)	26.2	1,425						
Conservative	Willie Chalmers	15.2	825	832	835	863	888	988	
SNP	Collette Stevenson	14.5	790	1,067	1,070	1,074	1,180	1,254	1,394
Labour	Susan Kerr (incumbent)	6.9	376	392	441	468	514		
Green	Iain Hughes	4.0	220	241	243	264			
Liberal Democrats	Mark Watson	1.8	98	101	102				
Electorate: 12,273 Valid: 5,439 Spoilt: 145 Quota: 1360 Turnout: 45.5%

=== East Kilbride Central North ===
Following the Fifth Statutory Reviews of Electoral Arrangements, East Kilbride Central North was reduced in size from a four-member ward to a three-member ward. The SNP retained both of the seats they had won at the previous election while Labour retained one of their two seats.

East Kilbride Central North - 3 seats
Party	Candidate	FPv%	Count						
Party	Candidate	FPv%	1	2	3	4	5	6	7
SNP	Hugh MacDonald	22.2	1,374	1,389	1,398	1,452	1,488	1,519	1,618
SNP	Sheena Wardhaugh (incumbent) (Note: East Kilbride Central North SNP councillor Sheena Wardhaugh resigned from the party and became an independent on 25 May 2017. On 2 June 2019, Sheena Wardhaugh died and a by-election was held on 29 August.)	20.1	1,243	1,249	1,261	1,351	1,390	1,420	1,482
Labour	Joe Fagan	18.8	1,163	1,173	1,198	1,229	1,873		
Conservative	Darren Clyde	18.8	1,163	1,165	1,188	1,209	1,258	1,319	
Labour	Alice Marie Mitchell (incumbent)	12.8	795	799	827	854			
Green	James Thornbury	3.9	239	254	294				
Liberal Democrats	John Rintoul	2.5	153	157					
Solidarity	Stuart McLean	1.1	69						
Electorate: 13,113 Valid: 6,199 Spoilt: 174 Quota: 1,550 Turnout: 48.6%

=== East Kilbride West ===
The Conservatives, Labour and the SNP held the seats they had won at the previous election.

East Kilbride West - 3 seats
Party	Candidate	FPv%	Count						
Party	Candidate	FPv%	1	2	3	4	5	6	7
Conservative	Ian Harrow	37.3	2,363						
Labour	Monique McAdams	20.7	1,315	1,529	1,571	1,612			
SNP	David Watson (incumbent) (Note: On 1 November 2018, East Kilbride West SNP councillor David Watson resigned from the party and became an independent after a legal dispute over an employee grievance.)	20.5	1,298	1,319	1,322	1,370	1,373	1,427	2,389
SNP	Ali Salamati	14.2	900	914	917	986	988	1,065	
Liberal Democrats	Ewan McRobert	3.5	223	374	397	447	458		
Green	Billy McLean	3.1	194	216	229				
UKIP	David Mackay	0.8	49	140					
Electorate: 12,151 Valid: 6,342 Spoilt: 74 Quota: 1,586 Turnout: 52.8%

=== East Kilbride East ===
The SNP (2) and Labour (1) retained the seats they had won at the previous election.

East Kilbride East - 3 seats
Party	Candidate	FPv%	Count							
Party	Candidate	FPv%	1	2	3	4	5	6	7	8
SNP	Gladys Miller (incumbent)	27.1	1,374							
Labour	Graham Scott	25.9	1,314							
Conservative	Isabel Perratt	18.0	911	912	920	939	981	1,030	1,078	
SNP	Jim Wardhaugh (incumbent) (Note: East Kilbride East SNP councillor Jim Wardhaugh resigned from the party and became an independent on 25 May 2017.)	15.3	773	857	862	867	873	902	1,101	1,306
Green	Kirsten Robb	7.2	366	378	384	392	418	464		
Independent	John Cairney (incumbent)	3.3	166	167	172	179	193			
Liberal Democrats	Lorna Gall	2.2	109	111	117	122				
UKIP	Brian Doolan	1.1	55	55	56					
Electorate: 11,025 Valid: 5,068 Spoilt: 81 Quota: 1,268 Turnout: 46.7%

=== Rutherglen South ===
The SNP, the Liberal Democrats and Labour retained the seats they had won at the previous election.

Rutherglen South - 3 seats
Party	Candidate	FPv%	Count				
Party	Candidate	FPv%	1	2	3	4	5
SNP	Carol Nugent	31.0	1,803				
Liberal Democrats	Robert Brown (incumbent)	31.0	1,798				
Labour	Margaret Cowie	19.7	1,142	1,220	1,333	1,343	1,522
Conservative	Taylor Muir	14.7	854	861	950	976	1,009
Green	Brian Finlay	2.6	152	324	364	383	
UKIP	Jack Sinclair	1.0	57	65	71		
Electorate: 11,557 Valid: 5,806 Spoilt: 65 Quota: 1,452 Turnout: 50.8%

=== Rutherglen Central and North ===
The SNP held the seat they had won at the previous election while Labour held one of their two seats and the Conservatives gained one seat from Labour.

Rutherglen Central and North - 3 seats
Party	Candidate	FPv%	Count						
Party	Candidate	FPv%	1	2	3	4	5	6	7
SNP	Janine Calikes	29.0	1,492						
Labour	Gerard Killen (incumbent) (Note: On 23 June 2017, Rutherglen Central and North Labour councillor Gerard Killen resigned his seat having been elected as MP for Rutherglen and Hamilton West. A by-election was held on 23 November 2017.)	25.5	1,313						
Conservative	Jared Wark	16.2	835	836	836	847	876	1,083	1,338
SNP	Gordon Clark (incumbent)	10.5	538	719	720	828	881	968	
Liberal Democrats	Liz Keenan	9.3	478	482	483	524	603		
Labour	Martin Lennon	5.4	279	282	304	330			
Green	Raymond Burke	4.0	206	217	217				
Electorate: 11,849 Valid: 5,141 Spoilt: 144 Quota: 1,286 Turnout: 44.6%

=== Cambuslang West ===
The SNP held the seat they had won at the previous election while Labour held one of their two seats and the Conservatives gained one seat from Labour.

Cambuslang West - 3 seats
Party	Candidate	FPv%	Count							
Party	Candidate	FPv%	1	2	3	4	5	6	7	8
Labour	Margaret Walker	24.2	1,336	1,346	1,369	1,397				
Conservative	Ann Le Blond	21.1	1,167	1,178	1,201	1,210	1,212	1,499		
SNP	John Bradley	19.9	1,099	1,104	1,110	1,149	1,150	1,214	1,220	2,170
SNP	Clare McColl (incumbent)	17.4	962	965	976	1,033	1,035	1,120	1,128	
Liberal Democrats	Norman Rae	11.7	648	651	672	696	700			
Green	David McClemont	2.9	161	165	176					
Independent	Don Ferguson	1.9	106	112						
UKIP	Kieran Kiely	0.9	50							
Electorate: 12,118 Valid: 5,529 Spoilt: 106 Quota: 1,383 Turnout: 46.5%

=== Cambuslang East ===
The SNP held the seat they had won at the previous election and gained a second seat from Labour while Labour held one of their two seats.

Cambuslang East - 3 seats
Party	Candidate	FPv%	Count							
Party	Candidate	FPv%	1	2	3	4	5	6	7	8
Labour	Walter Brogan (incumbent)	32.8	1,553							
SNP	Katy Loudon	23.7	1,123	1,139	1,145	1,154	1,225			
SNP	Alistair Fulton	18.1	857	876	879	896	923	958	1,019	1,140
Conservative	Gavin Douglas	14.1	668	690	762	792	810	811	902	
Green	Laura Martin	3.1	147	155	162	199				
Labour	Stuart Gallacher (Note: Sitting Councillor for Hamilton South.)	2.8	134	378	394	427	452	453		
Scottish Unionist	James Moore	2.7	129	137						
Liberal Democrats	Ellen Bryson	2.6	125	141	150					
Electorate: 11,505 Valid: 4,736 Spoilt: 108 Quota: 1,185 Turnout: 42.1%

=== Blantyre ===
Following the Fifth Statutory Reviews of Electoral Arrangements, Blantyre was reduced in size from a four-member ward to a three-member ward. Labour retained two of the three seats they had won at the previous election while the SNP retained their only seat.

Blantyre - 3 seats
Party	Candidate	FPv%	Count							
Party	Candidate	FPv%	1	2	3	4	5	6	7	8
Labour	Mo Razzaq (incumbent)	31.0	1,663							
SNP	Maureen Chalmers	25.3	1,354							
SNP	Michael McGlynn	14.8	797	815	827	838	860	879	902	
Labour	Bert Thomson (incumbent)	13.6	731	980	980	988	1,013	1,051	1,278	1,533
Conservative	Alan Fraser	11.1	593	601	601	603	607	635		
Liberal Democrats	Stephen Reid	1.9	100	109	109	112	125			
Solidarity	Ashley Hubbard	1.4	76	80	81	101				
Scottish Socialist	Gerry McMahon	0.9	48	51	52					
Electorate: 12,711 Valid: 5,362 Spoilt: 180 Quota: 1,341 Turnout: 43.6%

=== Bothwell and Uddingston ===
The SNP, Labour and the Conservatives held the seats they won at the previous election.

Bothwell and Uddingston - 3 seats
Party	Candidate	FPv%	Count				
Party	Candidate	FPv%	1	2	3	4	5
Conservative	Kenny McCreary	35.3	1,851				
Labour	Maureen Devlin (incumbent)	26.0	1,362				
SNP	Jim McGuigan (incumbent)	21.6	1,132	1,150	1,158	1,219	1,550
Liberal Democrats	Colin Robb	8.6	450	701	718	757	774
SNP	Phil Sykes	6.6	347	353	355	369	
Green	James Ferguson	2.0	106	134	140		
Electorate: 10,351 Valid: 5,248 Spoilt: 52 Quota: 1,313 Turnout: 51.2%

=== Hamilton North and East ===
The SNP retained the seat they had won at the previous election while Labour held one of their two seats and the Conservatives gained one seat from Labour.

Hamilton North and East - 3 seats
Party	Candidate	FPv%	Count					
Party	Candidate	FPv%	1	2	3	4	5	6
Conservative	Martin Hose	26.5	1,268					
SNP	Stephanie Callaghan (incumbent)	25.1	1,201					
Labour	Davie McLachlan (incumbent) (Note: In January 2018, Hamilton North and East Labour councillor Davie McLachlan was suspended from the party after allegedly making a racist remark about Anas Sarwar. Following an investigation, he was cleared of any wrongdoing and the suspension was lifted.)	23.6	1,128	1,144	1,144	1,158	1,180	1,239
SNP	Jason Douglas	10.9	521	522	525	541	603	633
Labour	Nina Reeves	6.2	296	301	301	305	320	343
Liberal Democrats	David Bennie	2.9	137	152	152	177	207	
Green	Steven Hannigan	3.2	152	154	154	165		
Independent	Balarabe Baba	1.8	87	94	94			
Electorate: 11,600 Valid: 4,790 Spoilt: 94 Quota: 1,198 Turnout: 42.1%

=== Hamilton West and Earnock ===
The SNP held both of their seats while Labour held one of their two seats and the Conservatives gained one seat from Labour.

Hamilton West and Earnock - 4 seats
Party	Candidate	FPv%	Count					
Party	Candidate	FPv%	1	2	3	4	5	6
SNP	Mary Donnelly	25.7	1,377					
Conservative	Mark McGeever (Note: On 26 July 2019, Hamilton West and Earnock Conservative councillor Mark McGeever resigned from the party and joined the Liberal Democrats following the election of Boris Johnson as Conservative Party Leader and Prime Minister.)	22.7	1,215					
Labour	Allan Falconer (incumbent)	20.4	1,092					
SNP	Graeme Horne (incumbent)	14.1	752	1,019	1,025	1,026	1,069	1,111
Labour	Jean McKeown (incumbent)	12.5	671	681	720	737	757	830
Liberal Democrats	Mark Ruston	2.5	134	138	176	176	208	
Green	Christine Wright	2.1	111	119	126	127		
Electorate: 14,110 Valid: 5,352 Spoilt: 151 Quota: 1,071 Turnout: 39.0%

=== Hamilton South ===
The SNP held both of their seats while Labour held one of their two seats and the Conservatives gained one seat from Labour.

Hamilton South - 4 seats
Party	Candidate	FPv%	Count						
Party	Candidate	FPv%	1	2	3	4	5	6	7
SNP	John Ross (incumbent)	30.6	2,167						
Labour	Joe Lowe (incumbent) (Note: Hamilton South Labour councillor and Joe Lowe resigned from the party and became an independent in May 2017.)	25.7	1,818						
Conservative	Lynne Nailon	21.8	1,544						
Labour	Brian McCaig (incumbent)	9.1	643	669	991	1,020	1,055	1,177	
SNP	Josh Wilson	6.7	475	1,105	1,112	1,115	1,209	1,245	1,485
Green	John Kane	3.0	216	249	257	265			
Liberal Democrats	Joanne Ferguson	3.0	210	228	244	282	345		
Electorate: 16,328 Valid: 7,073 Spoilt: 177 Quota: 1,415 Turnout: 44.4%

=== Larkhall ===
Labour held both of their seats while the SNP held one of their two seats and the Conservatives gained one seat from the SNP.

Larkhall - 4 seats
Party	Candidate	FPv%	Count								
Party	Candidate	FPv%	1	2	3	4	5	6	7	8	9
Conservative	Richard Nelson	26.34	1,645								
Labour	Andy Carmichael (incumbent)	17.71	1,106	1,150	1,161	1,179	1,202	1,483			
SNP	Peter Craig (incumbent)	16.83	1,051	1,056	1,060	1,067	1,120	1,153	1,175	1,176	1,880
Labour	Jackie Burns (incumbent) (Note: Larkhall Labour councillor Jackie Burns was expelled from the party and became an independent following a conviction for breach of the peace in May 2017.)	15.8	987	1,027	1,040	1,054	1,083	1,175	1,255		
SNP	Donald MacLeod	11.27	704	709	714	720	761	790	801	802	
Labour	Lesley McDonald (incumbent)	6.56	410	447	457	488	512				
Green	Bobby Bulloch	2.58	161	177	192	232					
Liberal Democrats	Lindsay Watt	1.63	102	160	180						
UKIP	Donald Murdo MacKay	1.28	80	143							
Electorate: 14,478 Valid: 6,246 Spoilt: 168 Quota: 1,250 Turnout: 44.3%

== By-elections ==
=== Rutherglen Central and North ===
On 23 June 2017, Labour councillor Gerard Killen resigned his seat having been elected as an MP for Rutherglen and Hamilton West. A by-election was held on 23 November 2017 and was won by Labour's Martin Lennon.

Rutherglen Central and North by-election (23 November 2017) - 1 seat
Party	Candidate	FPv%	Count				
Party	Candidate	FPv%	1	2	3	4	5
Labour	Martin Lennon	38.5	1,173	1,176	1,203	1,270	1,541
SNP	David Innes	27.4	836	838	870	884	989
Liberal Democrats	Ellen Bryson	18.2	554	558	574	711	
Conservative	Taylor Muir	12.1	368	377	379		
Green	Brian Finlay	2.9	88	93			
UKIP	Janice MacKay	0.9	28				
Electorate: 12,110 Valid: 3,047 Spoilt: 47 Quota: 1,524 Turnout: 25.5%

=== East Kilbride Central North ===
On 2 June 2019 East Kilbride Central North Independent and former SNP councillor Sheena Wardhaugh died. A by-election was held on 29 August 2019, won by the SNP's Grant Ferguson.

East Kilbride Central North by-election (29 August 2019) - 1 seat
Party	Candidate	FPv%	Count				
Party	Candidate	FPv%	1	2	3	4	5
SNP	Grant Ferguson	46.5	1,582	1,582	1,588	1,650	1,743
Labour	Kirsty Williams	20.3	690	692	695	715	837
Conservative	Graham Fisher	14.6	498	499	513	519	606
Liberal Democrats	Paul McGarry	12.4	422	424	428	456	
Green	Antony Lee	4.5	153	154	159		
UKIP	David MacKay	1.4	48	50			
Scottish Libertarian	Stephen McNamara	0.4	12				
Electorate: 12,960 Valid: 3,405 Spoilt: 51 Quota: 1,703 Turnout: 26.7%
