= Imogen Walker =

British politician

Imogen Walker MP
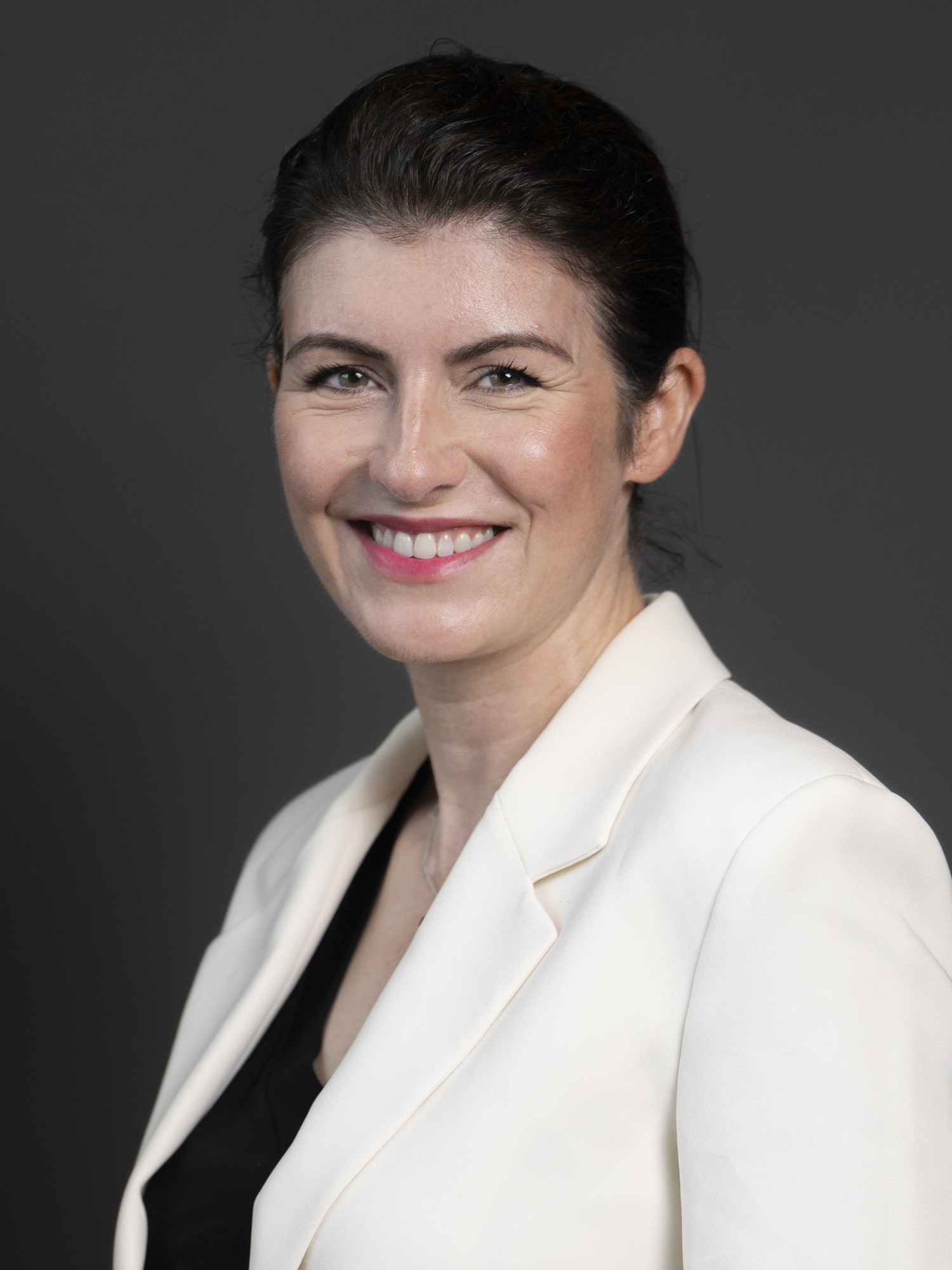
- Official portrait, 2024

Assistant Government Whip
- In office 7 September 2025 – 22 July 2026
- Prime Minister: Keir Starmer; Andy Burnham
- Chief Whip: Jonathan Reynolds
- Deputy Chief Whip: Mark Tami

Member of Parliament for Hamilton and Clyde Valley
- Incumbent
- Assumed office 4 July 2024
- Preceded by: Constituency established
- Majority: 9,472 (25.5%)

Member of Lambeth London Borough Council for Stockwell
- In office 4 May 2006 – 3 May 2018

Personal details
- Party: Labour Party
- Spouse: Morgan McSweeney
- Children: 1
- Education: University of Edinburgh

Imogen Walker is a Scottish Labour politician who has served as the Member of Parliament (MP) for Hamilton and Clyde Valley since the 2024 UK general election. She was an Assistant Whip.

== Early life and education ==
Walker comes from Lanark and went to school in Stirling. She attended drama school in London and graduated from the University of Edinburgh with a master's degree in mental philosophy.

== Early career ==
Walker has worked as an actor, including roles in Taggart, Doctors and The Big Read, from 1999 to 2007, a political consultant, and a vice president of the RSPCA, the animal welfare charity.

She also served as a ward councillor, deputy finance leader, and deputy leader (from 2014 to 2018) for the London Borough of Lambeth.

== Parliamentary career ==
In the 2024 United Kingdom general election Walker was elected as MP for the new constituency of Hamilton and Clyde Valley with a majority of 9,472. Shortly after being elected, she was appointed as Parliamentary Private Secretary to Rachel Reeves, Chancellor of the Exchequer.

In the September 2025 cabinet reshuffle Walker was appointed to the ministerial position of assistant government whip.

== Personal life ==
Walker is married to Morgan McSweeney, former Chief of Staff to Prime Minister Sir Keir Starmer. McSweeney used his position to aid his wife's selection as a candidate for the Labour Party. They have a son together.

Parliament of the United Kingdom
New constituency	Member of Parliament for Hamilton and Clyde Valley; 2024–present	Incumbent
