= Hamilton and Clyde Valley =

UK Parliament constituency (since 2024)

- County constituency for the House of Commons
- Interactive map of boundaries from 2024
- Location within Scotland
- Subdivision: South Lanarkshire
- Electorate: 74,577 (March 2020)
- Major settlements: Hamilton, Lesmahagow, Lanark, Kirkmuirhill, Larkhall

Current constituency
- Created: 2024
- Member of Parliament: Imogen Walker (Labour)
- Seats: One
- Created from: East Kilbride, Strathaven and Lesmahagow, Lanark and Hamilton East & Rutherglen and Hamilton West

Hamilton and Clyde Valley is a constituency of the House of Commons in the UK Parliament. It was established by the 2023 review of Westminster constituencies and first contested at the 2024 general election. It is represented by Imogen Walker of the Scottish Labour Party.

The constituency name refers to the town of Hamilton and the valley of the River Clyde south-east of Glasgow.

== Boundaries ==
The constituency comprises the following wards of South Lanarkshire:

- In full: Hamilton North and East, Hamilton West and Earnock, Hamilton South, Larkhall.
- In part: Clydesdale West (small area to the west, including the village of Crossford), Clydesdale North (area to the south of the railway line between Carluke and Carstairs stations, including the town of Lanark), Clydesdale South (northern areas including Lesmahagow).

It covers the following areas:

- Majority, including most of Hamilton, Larkhall and Lanark from the abolished Lanark and Hamilton East constituency.
- Western areas of Hamilton and Earnock from the Rutherglen and Hamilton West constituency (renamed Rutherglen).
- The communities of Blackwood, Kirkmuirhill and Lesmahagow from the East Kilbride, Strathaven and Lesmahagow constituency (renamed East Kilbride and Strathaven).

== Members of Parliament ==
Election	Member	Party
2024	Imogen Walker	Scottish Labour

== Elections ==
=== Elections in the 2020s ===
2024 general election: Hamilton and Clyde Valley
Party	Candidate	Votes	%	±%
Labour	Imogen Walker	21,020	49.9	+22.8
SNP	Ross Clark	11,548	27.4	−16.0
Conservative	Richard Nelson	4,589	10.9	−14.6
Reform	Lisa Judge	3,299	7.8	N/A
Liberal Democrats	Kyle Burns	1,511	3.6	−0.2
UKIP	Christopher Ho	117	0.3	N/A
Majority		9,472	22.5	N/A
Turnout		42,084	55.8	−7.8
Registered electors		75,480		
Labour gain from SNP		Swing	+19.4	

=== Elections in the 2010s ===
2019 notional result (Note: Estimate of the 2019 general election result as if the revised boundaries recommended under the 2023 boundary review were in place)
Party	Vote	%
SNP	20,604	43.4
Labour	12,846	27.1
Conservative	12,076	25.5
Liberal Democrats	1,816	3.8
Scottish Greens	79	0.2
Majority	7,758	16.4
Turnout	47,421	63.6
Electorate	74,577	
