= Cambuslang West (ward) =

Electoral ward in South Lanarkshire, Scotland

- South Lanarkshire
- Boundary of Cambuslang West in South Lanarkshire from 2007–2017.
- Population: 14,096 (2021)
- Electorate: 12,800 (2022)
- Major settlements: Cambuslang (part of)
- Scottish Parliament constituency: Rutherglen
- Scottish Parliament region: Glasgow
- UK Parliament constituency: Rutherglen

Current ward
- Created: 2007
- Number of councillors: 3
- Councillor: Margaret Walker (Labour)
- Councillor: John Bradley (SNP)
- Councillor: Norman Rae (Liberal Democrats)
- Created from: Cairns; Cambuslang Central; Cathkin/Springhall; Eastfield; Kirkhill/Whitlawburn; Long Calderwood

Cambuslang West is one of the 20 electoral wards of South Lanarkshire Council. Created in 2007, the ward elects three councillors using the single transferable vote electoral system and covers an area with a population of 14,096 people.

The ward has politically been split between Labour, the Liberal Democrats and the Scottish National Party (SNP) with each party returning one councillor at half of the elections.

== Boundaries ==
The ward was created following the Fourth Statutory Reviews of Electoral Arrangements ahead of the 2007 Scottish local elections. As a result of the Local Governance (Scotland) Act 2004, local elections in Scotland would use the single transferable vote electoral system from 2007 onwards so Cambuslang West was formed from an amalgamation of several previous first-past-the-post wards. It contained part of the former Cairns ward, roughly half of the former Cathkin/Springhall and Cambuslang Central wards as well as all of the former Eastfield and Kirkhill/Whitlawburn wards. As a result of amendments to the boundaries of the South Lanarkshire Council's management areas, the boundaries between Rutherglen and Cambuslang, East Kilbride and Hamilton were tweaked so Cambuslang West also contained part of the former Long Calderwood ward. Cambuslang West covers a suburban area in the west of Cambuslang including the town centre and the neighbourhoods of Eastfield, Greenlees, Kirkhill, Silverbank and Whitlawburn. The ward's northern boundary is the division with Glasgow City Council which runs along the River Clyde.

Prior to the local government reforms in the 1990s, Cambuslang was within the Glasgow District under Strathclyde Regional Council. One of its single-member wards was Cambuslang which included much of the same area as the current Cambuslang West.

Following the Fifth Statutory Reviews of Electoral Arrangements ahead of the 2017 Scottish local elections, streets around East Kilbride Road, Brownside Road and Dukes Road were transferred from the ward into Rutherglen South while streets between Greenlees Road and the Cathcart Circle Line railway tracks over Hamilton Road were transferred into Cambuslang West from Cambuslang East.

== Councillors ==
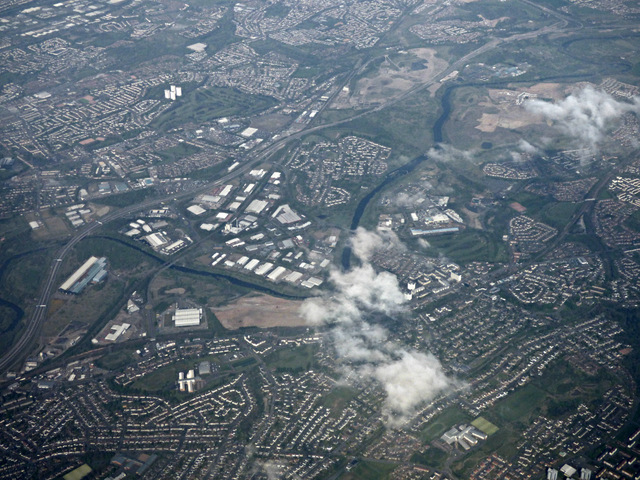
Aerial view of ward from the west

Election	Councillors		
2007	Clare McColl (SNP)	Russell Clearie (Labour)	David Baillie (Liberal Democrats)
2012	Clare McColl (SNP)	Russell Clearie (Labour)	Richard Tullett (Labour)
2017	John Bradley (SNP)	Margaret Walker (Labour)	Ann Le Blond (Conservative)
2022	John Bradley (SNP)	Margaret Walker (Labour)	Norman Rae (Liberal Democrats)

== Election results ==
=== 2022 election ===
Cambuslang West - 3 seats
Party	Candidate	FPv%	Count					
Party	Candidate	FPv%	1	2	3	4	5	6
Labour	Margaret Walker (incumbent)	30.1	1,727					
SNP	John Bradley (incumbent)	24.1	1,382	1,404	1,491			
SNP	Gillian Sutherland	14.9	856	882	1,000	1,049	1,066	
Conservative	Ann Le Blond (incumbent)	12.9	739	786	798	798		
Liberal Democrats	Norman Rae	12.7	730	826	890	893	1,416	1,802
Scottish Green	Tom Lauckner	5.2	301	327				
Electorate: 12,800 Valid: 5,735 Spoilt: 102 Quota: 1,434 Turnout: 45.6%

=== 2017 election ===
Cambuslang West - 3 seats
Party	Candidate	FPv%	Count							
Party	Candidate	FPv%	1	2	3	4	5	6	7	8
Labour	Margaret Walker	24.2	1,336	1,346	1,369	1,397				
Conservative	Ann Le Blond	21.1	1,167	1,178	1,201	1,210	1,212	1,499		
SNP	John Bradley	19.9	1,099	1,104	1,110	1,149	1,150	1,214	1,220	2,170
SNP	Clare McColl (incumbent)	17.4	962	965	976	1,033	1,035	1,120	1,128	
Liberal Democrats	Norman Rae	11.7	648	651	672	696	700			
Scottish Green	David McClemont	2.9	161	165	176					
Independent	Don Ferguson	1.9	106	112						
UKIP	Kieran Kiely	0.9	50							
Electorate: 12,118 Valid: 5,529 Spoilt: 106 Quota: 1,383 Turnout: 46.5%

=== 2012 election ===
Cambuslang West - 3 seats
Party	Candidate	FPv%	Count					
Party	Candidate	FPv%	1	2	3	4	5	6
Labour	Russell Clearie (incumbent)	34.7	1,669					
SNP	Clare McColl (incumbent)	26.2	1,260					
Liberal Democrats	David Baillie (incumbent)	14.7	707	759	762	836	1,048	
Labour	Richard Tullett (Note: Incumbent for Cambuslang East.)	12.6	606	950	961	1,030	1,065	1,395
Conservative	James MacKay	7.2	344	356	358	388		
Scottish Green	Janice Sharkey	4.7	228	245	260			
Electorate: 11,948 Valid: 4,814 Spoilt: 81 Quota: 1,204 Turnout: 40.3%

=== 2007 election ===
Cambuslang West - 3 seats
Party	Candidate	FPv%	Count						
Party	Candidate	FPv%	1	2	3	4	5	6	7
Labour	Russell Clearie (Note: Returning councillor for Cathkin/Springhall single-member ward.)	20.5	1,253	1,264	???	1,294	1,386	???	???
Labour	John McGuinness (Note: Returning councillor for Eastfield single-member ward.)	20.0	1,225	1,238	???	1,264	1,305	???	
SNP	Clare McColl	19.8	1,209	1,240	???	1,307	1,409	???	???
Liberal Democrats	David Baillie (Note: Returning councillor for Kirkhill/Whitlawburn single-member ward.)	19.5	1,191	1,206	???	1,294	1,597		
Conservative	Malcolm Macaskill	12.6	772	774	???	844			
Scottish Green	Christian Schmidt	3.1	187	207	???				
Scottish Unionist	Jimi Moore	2.5	154	161					
Scottish Socialist	David McClemont	2.1	130						
Electorate: 11,591 Valid: 6,121 Quota: 1,531 Turnout: 53.7%
