= Clydesdale North (ward) =

Electoral ward in Scotland

- South Lanarkshire
- Boundary of Clydesdale North in South Lanarkshire from 2007–2017.
- Population: 14,726 (2021)
- Electorate: 11,889 (2022)
- Major settlements: Lanark
- Scottish Parliament constituency: Clydesdale
- Scottish Parliament region: South Scotland
- UK Parliament constituency: Hamilton and Clyde Valley; Motherwell, Wishaw and Carluke

Current ward
- Created: 2007
- Number of councillors: 3
- Councillor: Catherine McClymont (Labour)
- Councillor: Julia Marrs (SNP)
- Councillor: Richard Elliot-Lockhart (Conservative)
- Created from: Carstairs/Carnwath; Clyde Valley; Forth; Lanark North; Lanark South; Lesmahagow

Clydesdale North is one of the 20 electoral wards of South Lanarkshire Council. Created in 2007, the ward elects three councillors using the single transferable vote electoral system and covers an area with a population of 14,726 people.

The ward has politically been split between the Scottish National Party (SNP), Labour and the Conservatives. Each party has held one of the three seats since the creation of the ward apart from the period following the 2012 election when independent councillor Ed Archer won a seat from the Conservatives.

== Boundaries ==
The ward was created following the Fourth Statutory Reviews of Electoral Arrangements ahead of the 2007 Scottish local elections. As a result of the Local Governance (Scotland) Act 2004, local elections in Scotland would use the single transferable vote electoral system from 2007 onwards so Clydesdale North was formed from an amalgamation of several previous first-past-the-post wards. It contained the majority of the former Forth ward, part of the previous Clyde Valley ward as well as all of the former Lanark North and Lanark South wards and a small area from each of the former Carstairs/Carnwath and Lesmahagow wards. Clydesdale North covers an area in the northeast of South Lanarkshire next to its boundaries with North Lanarkshire Council and West Lothian Council and takes in the town of Lanark plus Kirkfieldbank and a rural area to the northeast including the villages of Forth and Auchengray. The ward also contains the New Lanark UNESCO World Heritage Site. Following the Fifth Statutory Reviews of Electoral Arrangements ahead of the 2017 Scottish local elections, the ward's boundaries were not changed.

== Councillors ==
Election	Councillors		
2007	George Sutherland (SNP)	Mary McNeill (Labour)	Patrick Ross-Taylor (Conservative)
2012	Vivienne Shaw (SNP)	Catherine McClymont (Labour)	Ed Archer (Ind.)
2017	Julia Marrs (SNP)	Catherine McClymont (Labour)	Richard Eliott-Lockhart (Conservative)
2022	Julia Marrs (SNP)	Catherine McClymont (Labour)	Richard Eliott-Lockhart (Conservative)

== Election results ==
=== 2022 election ===
Clydesdale North - 3 seats
Party	Candidate	FPv%	Count
Party	Candidate	FPv%	1
Labour	Catherine McClymont (incumbent)	33.8	1,920
SNP	Julia Marrs (incumbent)	33.4	1,898
Conservative	Richard Eliott-Lockhart (incumbent)	26.9	1,530
Independent	Ronald Logan	4.9	277
Independent	John Scott	1.1	61
Electorate: 11,889 Valid: 5,686 Spoilt: 68 Quota: 1,422 Turnout: 48.4%

=== 2017 election ===
Clydesdale North - 3 seats
Party	Candidate	FPv%	Count
Party	Candidate	FPv%	1
Conservative	Richard Eliott-Lockhart	28.2	1,725
SNP	Julia Marrs	26.9	1,643
Labour	Catherine McClymont (incumbent)	26.8	1,638
Independent	Ed Archer (incumbent)	11.1	678
Independent	Ronald Logan	3.6	221
Scottish Green	Ryan Doherty	2.0	119
Liberal Democrats	Richard Mills	1.5	91
Electorate: 12,002 Valid: 6,115 Spoilt: 54 Quota: 1,529 Turnout: 51.4%

=== 2012 election ===
Clydesdale North - 3 seats
Party	Candidate	FPv%	Count					
Party	Candidate	FPv%	1	2	3	4	5	6
Labour	Catherine McClymont	27.5	1,253					
SNP	Vivienne Shaw	18.1	826	830	886	1,318		
Conservative	Patrick Ross-Taylor (incumbent)	17.8	813	815	864	905	927	
Independent	Ed Archer	16.0	729	734	836	874	933	1,406
SNP	George Sutherland (incumbent)	11.4	520	522	551			
Labour	Gordon Muir	9.2	418	511				
Electorate: 11,747 Valid: 4,559 Spoilt: 92 Quota: 1,140 Turnout: 38.8%

=== 2007 election ===
Clydesdale North - 3 seats
Party	Candidate	FPv%	Count					
Party	Candidate	FPv%	1	2	3	4	5	6
SNP	George Sutherland	24.8	1,468	1,521				
Labour	Mary McNeill (Note: Returning councillor for Lanark North single-member ward.)	20.9	1,237	1,270	1,273	1,483		
Conservative	Patrick Ross-Taylor	18.4	1,090	1,130	1,135	1,381	???	???
Labour	Brian Reilly (Note: Returning councillor for Lanark South single-member ward.)	17.2	1,019	1,029	1,033	1,231	???	
Liberal Democrats	Kenny Douglas	14.2	841	927	939			
Scottish Green	Thomas Davidson	4.5	265					
Electorate: 11,430 Valid: 5,920 Quota: 1,481 Turnout: 52.7%
