= Clydesdale East (ward) =

Electoral ward in South Lanarkshire, Scotland

- South Lanarkshire
- Boundary of Clydesdale East in South Lanarkshire from 2007–2017.
- Population: 13,165 (2021)
- Electorate: 10,578 (2022)
- Major settlements: Biggar
- Scottish Parliament constituency: Clydesdale
- Scottish Parliament region: South Scotland
- UK Parliament constituency: Dumfriesshire, Clydesdale and Tweeddale

Current ward
- Created: 2007
- Number of councillors: 3
- Councillor: Ian McAllan (SNP)
- Councillor: Alex Allison (Conservative)
- Councillor: Ralph Baker (Labour)
- Created from: Biggar/Symington and Black Mount; Carstairs/Carnwath; Duneaton/Carmicheal

Clydesdale East is one of the 20 electoral wards of South Lanarkshire Council. Created in 2007, the ward elects three councillors using the single transferable vote electoral system and covers an area with a population of 13,165 people

The ward has been a Conservative stronghold with the party winning two of the three seats in 2007 and 2017.

== Boundaries ==
The ward was created following the Fourth Statutory Reviews of Electoral Arrangements ahead of the 2007 Scottish local elections. As a result of the Local Governance (Scotland) Act 2004, local elections in Scotland would use the single transferable vote electoral system from 2007 onwards so Clydesdale East was formed from an amalgamation of several previous first-past-the-post wards. It contained the majority of the former Carstairs/Carnwath ward as well as all of the former Biggar/Symington and Black Mount and Duneaton/Carmicheal wards. Clydesdale East covers a large, rural and sparsely populated area in the southern- and eastern-most parts of South Lanarkshire next to its boundaries with Dumfries and Galloway, the Scottish Borders, West Lothian and East Ayrshire. The largest settlement in the ward is Biggar and it includes the villages of Abington, Carnwath, Carstairs, Carstairs Junction, Cleghorn, Crawford, Leadhills, Symington and Thankerton. Following the Fifth Statutory Reviews of Electoral Arrangements ahead of the 2017 Scottish local elections, the ward's boundaries were not changed.

== Councillors ==
Election	Councillors		
2007	Bev Gauld (SNP/Ind.)	Beith Forrest (Conservative)	Hamish Stewart (Conservative)
2012	Bev Gauld (SNP/Ind.)	Ralph Barker (Labour)	Hamish Stewart (Conservative)
2014	Bev Gauld (SNP/Ind.)	Ralph Barker (Labour)	Hamish Stewart (Conservative)
2017	Ian Donald McAllan (SNP)	Eric Holford (Conservative)	Alex Allison (Conservative)
2022	Ian Donald McAllan (SNP)	Ralph Barker (Labour)	Alex Allison (Conservative)

== Election results ==
=== 2022 election ===
Clydesdale East - 3 seats
Party	Candidate	FPv%	Count							
Party	Candidate	FPv%	1	2	3	4	5	6	7	8
SNP	Ian McAllan (incumbent)	28.6	1,513							
Conservative	Alex Allison (incumbent)	25.8	1,364							
Labour	Ralph Barker	16.4	869	876	879	882	952	1,034	1,218	1,517
Conservative	Eric Holford (incumbent)	15.0	794	797	832	850	881	903	929	
Scottish Green	Claire Watson	5.3	278	288	288	293	325			
SNP	John McLatchie	4.9	260	419	420	422	431	571		
Liberal Democrats	Nicholas Mark Tucker	3.1	162	165	165	171				
Scottish Family	Gareth Kirk	0.9	49	49	49					
Electorate: 10,578 Valid: 5,395 Spoilt: 106 Quota: 1,323 Turnout: 51.0%

=== 2017 election ===
Clydesdale East - 3 seats
Party	Candidate	FPv%	Count							
Party	Candidate	FPv%	1	2	3	4	5	6	7	8
Conservative	Alex Allison	35.5	1,927							
SNP	Ian Donald McAllan	25.7	1,393							
Labour	George Hannah	10.9	592	609	613	634	678	802	984	
Conservative	Eric Holford	9.7	526	959	960	967	992	1,021	1,136	1,386
Independent	Rev. Bev Gauld (incumbent)	8.6	469	508	511	539	560	617		
Scottish Green	Janet Moxley	4.9	268	277	293	324	376			
Liberal Democrats	Mark Gordon	2.7	144	160	162	170				
Independent	Andrew McCallum	2.1	112	121	123					
Electorate: 10,165 Valid: 5,431 Spoilt: 109 Quota: 1,358 Turnout: 54.5%

=== 2012 election ===
Clydesdale East - 3 seats
Party	Candidate	FPv%	Count					
Party	Candidate	FPv%	1	2	3	4	5	6
SNP	Bev Gauld (incumbent) (Note: Clydesdale East SNP councillor Reverend Bev Gauld resigned from the party and became an independent in February 2014 after the party legalised same-sex marriage.)	22.3	936	981	1,013	1,070		
Conservative	Hamish Stewart (incumbent)	19.8	832	882	1,453			
SNP	Ian Donald McAllan	17.7	745	783	810	850	864	
Labour	Ralph Barker	17.3	727	794	824	876	877	1,120
Conservative	John McLatchie	16.5	692	713				
Scottish Green	Janet Moxley	6.4	268					
Electorate: 9,815 Valid: 4,200 Spoilt: 65 Quota: 1,051 Turnout: 42.8%

=== 2007 election ===
Clydesdale East - 3 seats
Party	Candidate	FPv%	Count						
Party	Candidate	FPv%	1	2	3	4	5	6	7
Conservative	Beith Forrest (Note: Returning councillor for Duneaton/Carmichael single-member ward.)	22.5	1,204	???	1,252	1,325	1,364		
Conservative	Hamish Stewart	19.6	1,048	???	1,105	1,175	1,209	???	???
SNP	Bev Gauld (Note: Returning councillor for Carstairs/Carnwath single-member ward.)	19.5	1,042	???	1,093	1,630			
Labour	Ralph Barker	15.5	832	???	937	989	1,056	???	
SNP	Tom Mitchell	15.4	824	???	864				
Liberal Democrats	Ron Waddell	5.7	305	???					
Independent	Tom Dalbindle	1.9	101						
Electorate: 9,907 Valid: 5,356 Quota: 1,340 Turnout: 54.8%
