= Clydesdale West (ward) =

Electoral ward in South Lanarkshire, Scotland

- South Lanarkshire
- Boundary of Clydesdale West in South Lanarkshire from 2007–2017.
- Population: 19,350 (2021)
- Electorate: 15,706 (2022)
- Major settlements: Carluke
- Scottish Parliament constituency: Clydesdale
- Scottish Parliament region: South Scotland
- UK Parliament constituency: Motherwell, Wishaw and Carluke; Hamilton and Clyde Valley

Current ward
- Created: 2007
- Number of councillors: 4
- Councillor: Eileen Logan (Labour)
- Councillor: Poppy Corbett (Reform UK)
- Councillor: David Shearer (SNP)
- Councillor: Lynsey Hamilton (Labour)
- Created from: Clyde Valley; Carluke/Crawforddyke; Carluke/Whitehill; Forth; Law/Carluke

Clydesdale West is one of the 20 electoral wards of South Lanarkshire Council. Created in 2007, the ward elects four councillors using the single transferable vote electoral system and covers an area with a population of 19,350 people.

The ward has produced strong results for both the Scottish National Party (SNP) and Labour. Initially, the SNP held half the seats in the ward before swinging towards Labour which has held half the seats since 2012.

== Boundaries ==
The ward was created following the Fourth Statutory Reviews of Electoral Arrangements ahead of the 2007 Scottish local elections. As a result of the Local Governance (Scotland) Act 2004, local elections in Scotland would use the single transferable vote electoral system from 2007 onwards so Clydesdale West was formed from an amalgamation of several previous first-past-the-post wards. It contained part of the former Clyde Valley and Forth wards as well as all of the former Carluke/Crawforddyke, Carluke/Whitehill and Law/Carluke wards. Clydesdale West covers an area in the north of South Lanarkshire next to its boundary with North Lanarkshire Council and takes in a rural area surrounding the town of Carluke including the villages of Braidwood, Crossford and Law. Following the Fifth Statutory Reviews of Electoral Arrangements ahead of the 2017 Scottish local elections, the ward's boundaries were not changed.

== Councillors ==
Year	Councillors			
2007	Ian Gray (SNP)	David Shearer (SNP)	Eileen Logan (Labour)	Alex Allison (Conservative)
2012	Pat Lee (SNP/Solidarity)	David Shearer (SNP)	Eileen Logan (Labour)	Lynsey Hamilton (Labour)
2015	Pat Lee (SNP/Solidarity)	David Shearer (SNP)	Eileen Logan (Labour)	Lynsey Hamilton (Labour)
2017	Poppy Corbett (Conservative/ Reform UK)	David Shearer (SNP)	Eileen Logan (Labour)	Lynsey Hamilton (Labour)
2022	Poppy Corbett (Conservative/ Reform UK)	David Shearer (SNP)	Eileen Logan (Labour)	Lynsey Hamilton (Labour)
2025	Poppy Corbett (Conservative/ Reform UK)	David Shearer (SNP)	Eileen Logan (Labour)	Lynsey Hamilton (Labour)

== Election results ==
=== 2022 election ===
Clydesdale West - 4 seats
Party	Candidate	FPv%	Count					
Party	Candidate	FPv%	1	2	3	4	5	6
Labour	Eileen Logan (incumbent)	23.6	1,743					
Conservative	Poppy Corbett (incumbent)	23.6	1,742					
SNP	David Shearer (incumbent)	22.7	1,678					
Labour	Lynsey Hamilton (incumbent)	14.6	1,082	1,264	1,355	1,361	1,398	1,528
SNP	Andrew Wilson	10.0	737	751	756	936	1,035	1,060
Scottish Green	Neil Barton	3.1	230	236	243	249		
Liberal Democrats	Peter Charles Meehan	2.4	181	200	258	260	310	
Electorate: 15,706 Valid: 7,393 Spoilt: 122 Quota: 1,479 Turnout: 47.8%

=== 2017 election ===
Clydesdale West - 4 seats
Party	Candidate	FPv%	Count							
Party	Candidate	FPv%	1	2	3	4	5	6	7	8
Conservative	Poppy Corbett	31.2	2,264							
SNP	David Shearer (incumbent)	22.2	1,611							
Labour	Eileen Logan (incumbent)	21.6	1,566							
Labour	Lynsey Hamilton (incumbent)	11.6	839	1,049	1,055	1,133	1,160	1,192	1,322	1,616
SNP	Chris Travis	8.4	610	627	763	770	784	831	867	
Liberal Democrats	Peter Charles Meehan	2.0	148	314	316	323	335	372		
Scottish Green	Mandy Meikle	1.6	118	147	152	154	172			
Solidarity	Pat Lee (incumbent)	1.2	90	107	110	112				
Electorate: 15,183 Valid: 7,246 Spoilt: 133 Quota: 1,450 Turnout: 48.6%

=== 2012 election ===
Clydesdale West - 4 seats
Party	Candidate	FPv%	Count								
Party	Candidate	FPv%	1	2	3	4	5	6	7	8	9
Labour	Eileen Logan (incumbent)	29.1	1,687								
SNP	David Shearer (incumbent)	19.8	1,149	1,180							
SNP	Pat Lee (Note: Clydesdale West councillor Pat Lee defected from the SNP and joined Solidarity on 27 May 2015.)	15.9	921	944	960	977	989	1,000	1,023	1,094	1,248
Labour	Lynsey Hamilton	15.1	877	1,280							
Conservative	Alex Allison (incumbent)	11.1	644	653	662	662	674	700	728	799	
Independent	Duncan McFarlane	4.3	246	258	269	269	284	317	353		
Liberal Democrats	Peter Charles Meehan	2.2	126	136	143	144	149	150			
UKIP	Neil MacLeod	1.4	78	82	86	86	96				
Scottish Christian	Robin Mawhinney	1.1	65	69	74	74					
Electorate: 14,923 Valid: 5,793 Spoilt: 92 Quota: 1,159 Turnout: 38.8%

=== 2007 election ===
Clydesdale West - 4 seats
Party	Candidate	FPv%	Count						
Party	Candidate	FPv%	1	2	3	4	5	6	7
Labour	Eileen Logan (Note: Returning councillor for Carluke/Whitehill single-member ward.)	33.5	2,549						
SNP	Ian Gray (Note: Returning councillor for Forth single-member ward.)	25.6	1,948						
Conservative	Alex Allison	12.9	984	1,025	1,050	???	1,126	1,259	???
SNP	David Shearer (Note: Returning councillor for Law/Carluke single-member ward.)	12.2	925	1,005	1,279	???	1,360	1,504	???
Liberal Democrats	Peter Meehan	6.4	490	566	602	???	707		
Labour	Betty Rush (Note: Returning councillor for Clyde Valley single-member ward.)	4.7	359	933	949	???	989	1,131	
Scottish Christian	Robin Mawhinney	2.4	180	198	207	???			
Scottish Green	Ruth Thomas	2.3	174	193	203				
Electorate: 14,775 Valid: 7,645 Quota: 1,522 Turnout: 52.4%
