= Larkhall (South Lanarkshire ward) =

Electoral ward in South Lanarkshire, Scotland

- South Lanarkshire
- Boundary of Larkhall in South Lanarkshire from 2007–2017.
- Population: 18,524 (2020)
- Electorate: 15,010 (2022)
- Major settlements: Larkhall
- Scottish Parliament constituency: Hamilton, Larkhall and Stonehouse
- Scottish Parliament region: Central Scotland
- UK Parliament constituency: Hamilton and Clyde Valley

Current ward
- Created: 2007
- Number of councillors: 4
- Councillor: Andy Carmichael (Labour)
- Councillor: Richard Nelson (Conservative)
- Councillor: Ross Clark (SNP)
- Councillor: Lesley McDonald (Labour)
- Created from: Cadzow; Dalserf; Hamilton Centre/Ferniegair; Larkhall East; Larkhall South; Larkhall West; Stonehouse

Larkhall is one of the 20 electoral wards of South Lanarkshire Council. Created in 2007, the ward elects four councillors using the single transferable vote electoral system and covers an area with a population of 18,524 people.

The ward is a Labour stronghold with the party winning half the seats at every election since the ward's creation. Between 2014 and 2017, the party held three of the four seats following a defection.

== Boundaries ==
The ward was created following the Fourth Statutory Reviews of Electoral Arrangements ahead of the 2007 Scottish local elections. As a result of the Local Governance (Scotland) Act 2004, local elections in Scotland would use the single transferable vote electoral system from 2007 onwards so Larkhall was formed from an amalgamation of several previous first-past-the-post wards. It contained all of the former Dalserf, Larkhall East and Larkhall West wards as well as part of the former Cadzow ward and a small part of the former Hamilton Centre/Ferniegair and Stonehouse wards. As the name suggests, Larkhall centres on the town of Larkhall and the surrounding rural area including the villages of Ashgill, Netherburn and Quarter. The ward's eastern boundary is formed by the River Clyde which coincides with the council's border with North Lanarkshire Council. Following the Fifth Statutory Reviews of Electoral Arrangements ahead of the 2017 Scottish local elections, the ward's boundaries were unchanged.

== Councillors ==
Year	Councillors			
2007	Jackie Burns (Labour/Independent)	Andy Carmichael (Labour)	Peter Craig (SNP)	Lesley McDonald (SNP/Labour)
2012	Jackie Burns (Labour/Independent)	Andy Carmichael (Labour)	Peter Craig (SNP)	Lesley McDonald (SNP/Labour)
2014	Jackie Burns (Labour/Independent)	Andy Carmichael (Labour)	Peter Craig (SNP)	Lesley McDonald (SNP/Labour)
2017	Jackie Burns (Labour/Independent)	Andy Carmichael (Labour)	Peter Craig (SNP)	Richard Nelson (Conservative)
2022	Lesley McDonald (Labour)	Andy Carmichael (Labour)	Ross Clark (SNP)	Richard Nelson (Conservative)

== Election results ==
=== 2026 by-election ===
Larkhall by-election (9 July 2026) - 1 seat
Party	Candidate	FPv%	Count
Party	Candidate	FPv%	1
Conservative	Gary Burns		
Reform	Fiona McDermott		
SNP	Leigh Payne		
Labour	Chris Roarty		

=== 2022 election ===
Larkhall - 4 seats
Party	Candidate	FPv%	Count								
Party	Candidate	FPv%	1	2	3	4	5	6	7	8	9
Labour	Andy Carmichael (incumbent)	25.5	1,580								
Conservative	Richard Nelson (incumbent)	24.5	1,518								
SNP	Ross Clark	22.4	1,389								
Independent	Jackie Burns (incumbent)	10.3	639	679	725	732	742	753	796	886	
Labour	Lesley McDonald	7.5	463	678	745	752	759	769	831	975	1,379
SNP	George Sutherland	6.4	399	408	410	532	532	533	549		
Liberal Democrats	Jake Stevenson	2.4	148	157	199	202	211	223			
Scottish Libertarian	David Laird	0.6	36	41	44	45					
UKIP	Donald Murdo Mackay	0.3	21	25	56	56	63				
Electorate: 15,010 Valid: 6,193 Spoilt: 140 Quota: 1,239 Turnout: 42.2%

=== 2017 election ===
Larkhall - 4 seats
Party	Candidate	FPv%	Count								
Party	Candidate	FPv%	1	2	3	4	5	6	7	8	9
Conservative	Richard Nelson	26.34	1,645								
Labour	Andy Carmichael (incumbent)	17.71	1,106	1,150	1,161	1,179	1,202	1,483			
SNP	Peter Craig (incumbent)	16.83	1,051	1,056	1,060	1,067	1,120	1,153	1,175	1,176	1,880
Labour	Jackie Burns (incumbent) (Note: Larkhall Labour councillor Jackie Burns was expelled from the party and became an independent following a conviction for breach of the peace in May 2017.)	15.8	987	1,027	1,040	1,054	1,083	1,175	1,255		
SNP	Donald MacLeod	11.27	704	709	714	720	761	790	801	802	
Labour	Lesley McDonald (incumbent)	6.56	410	447	457	488	512				
Green	Bobby Bulloch	2.58	161	177	192	232					
Liberal Democrats	Lindsay Watt	1.63	102	160	180						
UKIP	Donald Murdo MacKay	1.28	80	143							
Electorate: 14,478 Valid: 6,246 Spoilt: 168 Quota: 1,250 Turnout: 44.3%

=== 2012 election ===
Larkhall - 4 seats
Party	Candidate	FPv%	Count		
Party	Candidate	FPv%	1	2	3
Labour	Jackie Burns (incumbent)	37.4	1,965		
SNP	Peter Craig (incumbent)	21.4	1,124		
SNP	Lesley McDonald (incumbent) (Note: Larkhall councillor Lesley McDonald defected from the SNP and joined Labour on 2 May 2014.)	18.2	958	1,010	1,102
Labour	Andy Carmichael (incumbent)	14.3	752	1,507	
Conservative	David Murray	6.11	321	334	363
UKIP	Donald Murdo MacKay	2.5	131	141	177
Electorate: 14,510 Valid: 5,251 Spoilt: 106 Quota: 1,051 Turnout: 36.2%

=== 2007 election ===
Larkhall - 4 seats
Party	Candidate	FPv%	Count						
Party	Candidate	FPv%	1	2	3	4	5	6	7
Labour	Jackie Burns (Note: Returning councillor for Larkhall South single-member ward.)	38.0	2,699						
SNP	Peter Craig	17.8	1,264	1,335	1,387	1,437			
SNP	Lesley McDonald	12.5	890	931	981	1,059	1,071	1,212	???
Conservative	Gregor Cameron	7.9	563	591	640	795	796		
Labour	Robin Cunningham	7.1	502	727	757	828	829	888	
Scottish Unionist	Mary Duckett	6.6	466	507	545				
Labour	Andy Carmichael	5.2	366	1,025	1,066	1,109	1,110	1,189	???
Liberal Democrats	Callan Dick	4.9	349	376					
Electorate: 14,934 Valid: 7,099 Quota: 1,420 Turnout: 48.7%
