= 1984 Hamilton District Council election =

Hamilton District Council election

← 1980	3 May 1984	1988 →

All 20 seats to Hamilton District Council 11 seats needed for a majority
- Registered: 79,126
- Turnout: 45.2%
	First party	Second party	Third party
	Lab	Lib	Con
Party	Labour	Liberal	Conservative
Last election	17 seats, 56.5%	2 seats, 10.3%	1 seats, 22.0%
Seats won	17	2	1
Seat change	Steady	Steady	Steady
Popular vote	21,839	4,602	3,600
Percentage	64.9%	13.6%	10.7%
Swing	▲8.4	▲3.3	▼11.3
Council Leader before election
Labour
Council Leader after election
Labour

Elections to Hamilton District Council were held on 3 May 1984, on the same day as the other Scottish local government elections. This was the fourth election to the district council following the local government reforms in the 1970s.

The election was the first to use the 20 wards created by the Initial Statutory Reviews of Electoral Arrangements in 1980. Each ward elected one councillor using first-past-the-post voting.

Labour maintained control of the district council after winning 17 of the 20 seats and taking almost two-thirds of the popular vote. The Liberal Party – who had contested the election in an electoral alliance with the Social Democratic Party (SDP) – won two seats and the remaining seat was won by the Conservatives. The election resulted in the same political composition as the previous election.

== Results ==
1984 Hamilton District Council election result
Party	Seats	Gains	Losses	Net gain/loss	Seats %	Votes %	Votes	+/−
Labour	17	1	1	Steady	85.0	64.9	21,839	▲8.4
Liberal	2	0	0	Steady	10.0	13.6	4,602	▲3.3
Conservative	1	1	1	Steady	5.0	10.7	3,600	▼11.3
SNP	0	0	0	Steady	0.0	8.0	2,708	▼0.3
SDP	0	0	0	Steady	0.0	2.6	908	New
Total	20						33,657	

== Ward results ==
=== Hillhouse ===
Hillhouse
Party	Candidate	Votes	%	±%
Labour	R. Newberry	1,284	82.7	▲1.0
Liberal	G. Gloyer	123	7.9	New
SNP	M. Miller	98	6.3	New
Conservative	H. MacKie	47	3.0	▼3.2
Majority		1,161	74.8	▲5.2
Turnout		1,552	41.9	▲4.4
Registered electors		3,708		
Labour hold		Swing	▲1.0	

=== Udston ===
Udston
Party	Candidate	Votes	%	±%
Labour	S. Dallas	1,486	77.4	▼7.7
SNP	J. Pollock	248	12.9	New
SDP	E. Valerio	182	9.5	New
Majority		1,238	64.5	▼6.3
Turnout		1,916	45.7	▼6.6
Registered electors		4,201		
Labour hold		Swing	▼7.7	

=== Wellhall North ===
Wellhall North
Party	Candidate	Votes	%	±%
Labour	B. McKinnon	688	41.3	▼8.2
Liberal	I. Fleming	650	39.1	New
Conservative	J. Bath	213	12.3	▼14.2
SNP	J. Randalls	112	6.7	▼17.2
Majority		38	2.2	▼21.8
Turnout		1,663	41.0	▼9.4
Registered electors		4,061		
Labour hold		Swing	▼4.1	

=== Central ===
Central
Party	Candidate	Votes	%	±%
Labour	T. Murphy	953	51.1	▼12.8
Conservative	A. Aitchison	546	29.3	▼6.5
SDP	J. Kane	241	12.9	New
SNP	K. Darling	122	6.5	New
Majority		407	20.8	▼7.3
Turnout		1,862	47.4	▼3.1
Registered electors		3,936		
Labour hold		Swing	▼12.8	

=== Burnbank ===
Burnbank
Party	Candidate	Votes	%	±%
Labour	I. McKillop	1,496	86.9	▲20.4
Conservative	M. Aitchison	216	12.5	▲2.3
Majority		1,280	74.5	▲25.1
Turnout		1,712	39.5	▼12.3
Registered electors		4,365		
Labour hold		Swing	▲20.4	

=== Ferniegair ===
Ferniegair
Party	Candidate	Votes	%
Conservative	J. Dorricott	779	42.5
Labour	M. Smith	635	34.6
SDP	H. Ormsby	301	16.4
SNP	A. McCubbin	118	6.4
Majority		144	7.9
Turnout		1,833	47.9
Registered electors		3,833	
Conservative win (new seat)			

=== Fairhill ===
Fairhill
Party	Candidate	Votes	%	±%
Labour	N. Cochrane	1,469	83.9	▼0.5
Conservative	D. Murray	274	15.6	▲0.1
Majority		1,195	68.3	▼0.6
Turnout		1,743	44.3	▼0.6
Registered electors		3,955		
Labour hold		Swing	▼0.5	

=== Woodhead ===
Woodhead
Party	Candidate	Votes	%
Labour	J. Lowe	1,654	83.4
SNP	S. Buchanan	199	10.0
Conservative	J. Scott	129	6.5
Majority		1,455	73.4
Turnout		1,982	44.8
Registered electors		4,432	
Labour win (new seat)			

=== Low Waters ===
Low Waters
Party	Candidate	Votes	%	±%
Labour	P. Grenfell	741	38.1	▲1.8
Conservative	A. Kegg	608	31.3	▼32.8
Liberal	S. Strachan	428	22.0	New
SNP	I. Campbell	166	8.5	New
Majority		133	6.8	N/A
Turnout		1,943	49.7	▼5.6
Registered electors		3,915		
Labour gain from Conservative		Swing	▲1.0	

=== Cadzow ===
Cadzow
Party	Candidate	Votes	%	±%
Labour	G. Smith	1,464	82.6	▲23.9
SNP	I. McGowan	300	16.9	▼3.1
Majority		1,164	65.7	▲28.3
Turnout		1,764	46.6	▼9.8
Registered electors		3,806		
Labour hold		Swing	▲23.9	

=== Dalserf ===
Dalserf
Party	Candidate	Votes	%	±%
Labour	J. Millward	813	68.3	▲8.6
SNP	J. Braithwaite	191	16.1	▼4.1
SDP	H. Rooney	184	15.5	New
Majority		622	52.2	▲12.7
Turnout		1,188	36.3	▼9.6
Registered electors		3,278		
Labour hold		Swing	▲8.6	

=== Larkhall East ===
Larkhall East
Party	Candidate	Votes	%
Labour	J. Borland	971	67.5
SNP	M. Miller	460	32.0
Majority		511	35.5
Turnout		1,431	3,537
Registered electors		3,537	
Labour win (new seat)			

=== Larkhall North ===
Larkhall North
Party	Candidate	Votes	%
Labour	J. Speirs	1,098	77.7
SNP	J. Mitchell	302	21.4
Majority		796	56.3
Turnout		1,400	38.2
Registered electors		3,702	
Labour win (new seat)			

=== Larkhall South ===
Larkhall South
Party	Candidate	Votes	%
Labour	T. Casserly	1,235	82.1
SNP	T. Frew	265	17.6
Majority		970	64.5
Turnout		1,500	46.0
Registered electors		3,275	
Labour win (new seat)			

=== Stonehouse ===
Stonehouse
Party	Candidate	Votes	%
Labour	R. Gibb	1,302	60.2
Liberal	F. McDermid	732	33.8
SNP	A. Broadfoot	127	5.9
Majority		570	26.4
Turnout		2,161	55.3
Registered electors		3,910	
Labour hold			

=== Uddingston ===
Uddingston
Party	Candidate	Votes	%
Liberal	T. Maxwell	1,118	56.6
Labour	J. Robertson	563	28.5
Conservative	M. Scott	289	14.6
Majority		555	28.1
Turnout		1,970	52.2
Registered electors		3,782	
Liberal win (new seat)			

=== Bothwell ===
Bothwell
Party	Candidate	Votes	%
Liberal	T. Grieve	1,298	54.1
Labour	S. Sloss	897	37.4
Conservative	W. Irving	200	8.3
Majority		401	16.7
Turnout		2,395	54.3
Registered electors		4,420	
Liberal win (new seat)			

=== High Blantyre ===
High Blantyre
Party	Candidate	Votes	%
Labour	J. Swinburne	1,555	92.0
Conservative	G. Prince	131	7.7
Majority		1,424	84.3
Turnout		1,686	42.4
Registered electors		3,987	
Labour hold			

=== Blantyre ===
Blantyre
Party	Candidate	Votes	%
Labour	D. Tremble	1,535	78.2
Liberal	D. McWhirter	253	12.9
Conservative	A. Walker	168	8.6
Majority		1,282	65.3
Turnout		1,956	43.2
Registered electors		4,544	
Labour hold			

=== Stonefield ===
Stonefield
Party	Candidate	Votes	%
Labour	H. Dunsmuir	Unopposed	
Registered electors		4,479	
Labour hold			
