= 1992 Hamilton District Council election =

Hamilton District Council election

← 1988	7 May 1992

All 20 seats to Hamilton District Council 11 seats needed for a majority
- Registered: 79,751
- Turnout: 36.9%
	First party	Second party
	Lab	Con
Party	Labour	Conservative
Last election	15 seats, 54.7%	1 seat, 10.0%
Seats won	15	2
Seat change	Steady	▲1
Popular vote	15,271	3,340
Percentage	52.2%	11.5%
Swing	▼2.5	▲1.5
	Third party	Fourth party
	LD	ILab
Party	Liberal Democrats	Independent Labour
Last election	2 seats, 7.8%	1 seat, 6.6%
Seats won	2	1
Seat change	Steady	Steady
Popular vote	2,121	1,814
Percentage	7.3%	5.5%
Swing	▼0.5	▼1.1
- The result of the election
Council Leader before election
Labour
Council Leader after election
Labour

Elections to Hamilton District Council were held on 7 May 1992, on the same day as the other Scottish local government elections. This was the final election to the district council which was abolished in 1995 along with East Kilbride District Council and Clydesdale District Council and, combined with part of the abolished City of Glasgow District Council, was replaced by South Lanarkshire Council following the implementation of the Local Government etc. (Scotland) Act 1994. The regional council, Strathclyde, was also abolished and the new unitary authority took on its responsibilities.

The election was also the last to use the 20 wards created by the Initial Statutory Reviews of Electoral Arrangements in 1980 without alterations. Each ward elected one councillor using first-past-the-post voting.

Labour maintained control of the district council after winning 15 of the 20 seats. Despite a slight reduction in their vote share, they again took more than half the votes cast. Both the Conservatives and Liberal Democrats won two seats and the remaining seat was won by Independent Labour. Despite coming second in the popular vote, the Scottish National Party (SNP) lost their only seat.

== Results ==
Hamilton District Council election result 1992
Party	Seats	Gains	Losses	Net gain/loss	Seats %	Votes %	Votes	+/−
Labour	15	2	2	Steady	75.0	52.2	15,271	▼2.5
Conservative	2	1	0	▲1	10.0	11.5	3,340	▲1.5
Liberal Democrats	2	0	0	Steady	10.0	7.3	2,121	▼0.5
Independent Labour	1	1	1	Steady	5.0	5.5	1,634	▼1.1
SNP	0	0	1	▼1	0.0	22.8	6,651	▲2.9
Independent	0	0	0	Steady	0.0	0.5	199	New
Scottish Green	0	0	0	Steady	0.0	0.4	99	New
Democratic Left	0	0	0	Steady	0.0	0.1	57	New
Total	20						29,282	

== Ward results ==
=== Hillhouse ===
Hillhouse
Party	Candidate	Votes	%	±%
Labour	R. Newberry	562	67.8	▼10.7
SNP	T. Muir	264	31.8	▲13.7
Majority		298	36.0	▼24.4
Turnout		826	24.7	▼18.7
Registered electors		3,353		
Labour hold		Swing	▼12.2	

=== Udston ===
Udston
Party	Candidate	Votes	%	±%
Labour	J. Daisley	1,109	73.6	▼0.6
SNP	V. Dow	288	19.1	▼6.3
Scottish Green	J. Condron	99	6.6	New
Majority		821	54.5	▲5.7
Turnout		1,496	36.8	▼12.6
Registered electors		4,094		
Labour hold		Swing	▼0.3	

=== Wellhall North ===
Wellhall North
Party	Candidate	Votes	%	±%
Liberal Democrats	I. Blackstock	1,038	59.4	▲23.1
Labour	W. C. Agnew	508	29.1	▲8.0
Conservative	D. Thomas	200	11.4	▲1.6
Majority		530	30.3	▲15.1
Turnout		1,746	39.1	▼5.4
Registered electors		4,464		
Liberal Democrats hold		Swing	▲7.5	

=== Central ===
Central
Party	Candidate	Votes	%	±%
Labour	T. Murphy	570	38.5	▼13.2
Conservative	S. McHarg	484	32.7	▲4.9
SNP	J. McGuigan	368	24.9	New
Democratic Left	I. Donnely	57	3.9	New
Majority		86	5.8	▼18.3
Turnout		1,479	33.5	▼10.1
Registered electors		4,417		
Labour hold		Swing	▼9.0	

=== Burnbank ===
Burnbank
Party	Candidate	Votes	%	±%
Labour	J. Ward	940	77.3	▲19.6
Liberal Democrats	J. Oswald	136	11.2	New
Conservative	M. Murray	132	10.9	▲6.7
Majority		804	66.1	▲31.1
Turnout		1,208	32.3	▼15.0
Registered electors		3,768		
Labour hold		Swing	▲21.1	

=== Ferniegair ===
Ferniegair
Party	Candidate	Votes	%	±%
Conservative	M. J. Mitchell	779	46.8	▲5.7
Labour	M. A. Smith	532	32.0	▼2.2
SNP	G. Lloyd	353	21.2	▼3.1
Majority		247	14.8	▲7.9
Turnout		1,664	41.2	▼6.2
Registered electors		4,035		
Conservative hold		Swing	▲3.9	

=== Fairhill ===
Fairhill
Party	Candidate	Votes	%	±%
Labour	J. Walls	548	36.4	▼28.4
Independent Labour	N. Cochrane	495	32.8	New
SNP	S. McCandless	344	22.8	▼9.0
Independent	J. Williamson	119	7.9	New
Majority		53	3.6	▼27.4
Turnout		1,506	41.7	▼6.8
Registered electors		3,618		
Labour hold		Swing	▼30.6	

=== Woodhead ===
Woodhead
Party	Candidate	Votes	%	±%
Labour	J. Lowe	854	64.5	▼8.8
SNP	A. Rae	294	22.2	▼4.1
Independent Labour	J. Bain	172	13.0	New
Majority		560	42.3	▼10.7
Turnout		1,320	31.1	▼13.9
Registered electors		4,252		
Labour hold		Swing	▼5.9	

=== Low Waters ===
Low Waters
Party	Candidate	Votes	%	±%
Conservative	W. Irving	537	31.7	▲2.2
SNP	N. Dear	523	30.8	▲2.1
Labour	C. McFadden	385	22.7	▼18.9
Independent Labour	P. R. Grenfell	248	14.6	New
Majority		14	0.9	N/A
Turnout		1,693	42.9	▼6.7
Registered electors		3,949		
Conservative gain from Labour		Swing	▲1.1	

=== Cadzow ===
Cadzow
Party	Candidate	Votes	%	±%
Labour	R. McKeown	919	51.0	▲5.2
SNP	J. Smith	876	48.6	▲0.9
Majority		43	2.4	N/A
Turnout		1,795	44.5	▼6.9
Registered electors		4,055		
Labour gain from SNP		Swing	▲2.1	

=== Dalserf ===
Dalserf
Party	Candidate	Votes	%	±%
Labour	M. Ahmed	814	67.7	▲15.6
SNP	I. McGowan	367	30.5	▲16.1
Majority		447	37.2	▲5.9
Turnout		1,181	35.7	▼17.0
Registered electors		3,370		
Labour hold		Swing	▲8.2	

=== Larkhall East ===
Larkhall East
Party	Candidate	Votes	%	±%
Labour	R. Ferguson	651	53.7	▼4.6
SNP	M. Miller	551	45.5	▲4.4
Majority		100	8.2	▼9.0
Turnout		1,202	35.0	▼11.6
Registered electors		3,466		
Labour hold		Swing	▼4.5	

=== Larkhall North ===
Larkhall North
Party	Candidate	Votes	%	±%
Labour	R. Ferguson	819	63.4	▼2.8
SNP	J. Meikle	459	35.5	▲2.7
Majority		360	27.9	▼5.5
Turnout		1,278	33.1	▼13.1
Registered electors		3,904		
Labour hold		Swing	▼2.7	

=== Larkhall South ===
Larkhall South
Party	Candidate	Votes	%	±%
Labour	S. Casserly	776	67.8	▼4.8
SNP	S. Clarkson	362	31.6	▲4.3
Majority		414	36.2	▼9.1
Turnout		1,138	35.5	▼15.2
Registered electors		3,225		
Labour hold		Swing	▼4.5	

=== Stonehouse ===
Stonehouse
Party	Candidate	Votes	%	±%
Labour	R. Gibb	1,120	68.6	▲2.6
SNP	G. Sutherland	502	30.7	▲17.3
Majority		618	37.9	▼8.7
Turnout		1,622	39.4	▼10.6
Registered electors		4,140		
Labour hold		Swing	▲1.9	

=== Uddingston ===
Uddingston
Party	Candidate	Votes	%	±%
Liberal Democrats	T. Maxwell	947	50.2	▲0.7
Labour	J. Keenan	617	32.7	▼4.7
Conservative	E. Montgomery	323	17.1	▲4.2
Majority		330	17.5	▲5.4
Turnout		1,887	44.7	▼9.2
Registered electors		4,228		
Liberal Democrats hold		Swing	▲0.3	

=== Bothwell ===
Bothwell
Party	Candidate	Votes	%	±%
Labour	M. Rooney	920	50.7	▲9.5
Conservative	I. S. MacAusline	885	48.8	▲33.5
Majority		35	1.9	▼5.3
Turnout		1,805	37.8	▼18.7
Registered electors		4,794		
Labour hold		Swing	▲4.8	

=== High Blantyre ===
High Blantyre
Party	Candidate	Votes	%	±%
Independent Labour	J. Swinburne	719	45.6	▲20.2
Labour	M. Martin	607	38.5	▼19.5
SNP	C. Sutherland	249	15.8	▼0.6
Majority		112	7.1	N/A
Turnout		1,575	41.2	▼12.3
Registered electors		3,826		
Independent Labour gain from Labour		Swing	▲19.8	

=== Blantyre ===
Blantyre
Party	Candidate	Votes	%	±%
Labour	J. Handibode	995	70.3	▲34.2
SNP	J. Pollock	409	28.9	New
Majority		586	41.4	N/A
Turnout		1,404	31.4	▼19.2
Registered electors		4,511		
Labour gain from Independent Labour		Swing	▲17.1	

=== Stonefield ===
Stonefield
Party	Candidate	Votes	%	±%
Labour	M. McGlynn	1,025	69.6	▼7.4
SNP	P. Stewart	442	30.0	▲7.3
Majority		583	39.6	▼14.7
Turnout		1,467	34.4	▼11.2
Registered electors		4,282		
Labour hold		Swing	▼7.3	
