= 1977 Hamilton District Council election =

Hamilton District Council election

← 1974	3 May 1977	1980 →

All 20 seats to Hamilton District Council 11 seats needed for a majority
- Registered: 76,551
- Turnout: 53.2%
	First party	Second party
	Lab	SNP
Party	Labour	SNP
Last election	13 seats, 45.7%	2 seats, 26.7%
Seats won	10	6
Seat change	▼3	▲4
Popular vote	17,088	13,442
Percentage	42.1%	33.1%
Swing	▼3.6	▲6.4
	Third party	Fourth party
	Lib	Con
Party	Liberal	Conservative
Last election	2 seats, 7.3%	2 seats, 12.4%
Seats won	2	1
Seat change	Steady	▼1
Popular vote	2,517	5,123
Percentage	6.2%	12.6%
Swing	▼1.1	▲0.2
Council Leader before election
Labour
Council Leader after election
No overall control

Elections to Hamilton District Council were held on 3 May 1977, on the same day as the other Scottish local government elections. This was the second election to the district council following the local government reforms in 1974.

The election used the original 20 wards created by the Formation Electoral Arrangements in 1974. Each ward elected one councillor using first-past-the-post voting.

After a net loss of three seats, Labour lost their majority on the council but remained as the largest single party after winning half the seats. The Scottish National Party (SNP) recorded their best result in a Hamilton District election after winning six seats – an increase of four and a result they wouldn't match in the area for 30 years. The Liberals retained their two seats while the Conservatives lost one seat to return one councillor. The remaining seat was won by Independent Labour.

== Results ==
1977 Hamilton District Council election result
Party	Seats	Gains	Losses	Net gain/loss	Seats %	Votes %	Votes	+/−
Labour	10	2	5	▼3	50.0	42.1	17,088	▼3.6
SNP	6	4	0	▲4	30.0	33.1	13,442	▲6.4
Liberal	2	0	0	Steady	10.0	6.2	2,517	▼1.1
Conservative	1	0	1	▼1	5.0	12.6	5,123	▲0.2
Independent Labour	1	1	0	▲1	5.0	1.6	639	▼4.0
Independent	0	0	1	▼1	0.0	4.1	1,664	▲2.0
Communist	0	0	0	Steady	0.0	0.4	148	▲0.1
Total	20						40,621	

== Ward results ==
=== Hillhouse ===
Hillhouse
Party	Candidate	Votes	%	±%
SNP	G. McLachlan	855	52.5	▲12.7
Labour	R. Newberry	775	47.5	▼12.7
Majority		80	5.0	N/A
Turnout		1,630	50.4	▲1.4
Registered electors		3,239		
SNP gain from Labour		Swing	▲12.7	

=== Udston ===
Udston
Party	Candidate	Votes	%
Independent Labour	S. Dallas	639	37.0
Labour	M. Adam	584	33.8
SNP	E. Alexander	504	29.2
Majority		55	3.2
Turnout		1,727	52.0
Registered electors		3,320	
Independent Labour gain from Labour			

=== Wellhall North ===
Wellhall North
Party	Candidate	Votes	%	±%
SNP	M. Kirkwood	722	41.9	▼5.4
Labour	H. Doyle	460	26.7	▲0.3
Conservative	A. Aitchison	436	25.3	▼1.1
Independent	S. Clarke	106	6.1	New
Majority		262	15.2	▼5.7
Turnout		1,724	53.8	▲7.5
Registered electors		3,207		
SNP hold		Swing	▼2.8	

=== Central ===
Central
Party	Candidate	Votes	%	±%
Labour	T. Murphy	506	38.2	▼9.5
SNP	K. Darling	441	33.3	New
Conservative	G. Cowper	376	28.4	▼23.9
Majority		65	4.9	N/A
Turnout		1,323	54.9	▲0.2
Registered electors		2,411		
Labour gain from Conservative		Swing	▼6.3	

=== Burnbank ===
Burnbank
Party	Candidate	Votes	%	±%
Labour	C. Brownlie	1,154	61.4	▲0.2
SNP	G. MacDonald	660	35.1	▼3.7
Communist	M. McIntosh	67	3.6	New
Majority		494	26.3	▲3.9
Turnout		1,881	47.2	▼3.1
Registered electors		3,989		
Labour hold		Swing	▲0.2	

=== Bent ===
Bent
Party	Candidate	Votes	%	±%
SNP	J. Ross	907	52.4	▲12.1
Labour	A. Welsh	428	24.7	▼9.8
Conservative	J. Bell	395	22.8	▼2.4
Majority		479	27.7	▲21.9
Turnout		1,730	55.2	▼1.8
Registered electors		3,138		
SNP hold		Swing	▲12.1	

=== Fairhill ===
Fairhill
Party	Candidate	Votes	%	±%
Labour	N. Cochrane	1,406	54.6	▲3.3
SNP	J. McGowan	1,087	42.2	▼2.6
Communist	A. Valentine	81	3.1	▼0.9
Majority		319	12.4	▲5.9
Turnout		2,574	50.9	▲0.2
Registered electors		5,077		
Labour hold		Swing	▲3.3	

=== Wellhall South ===
Wellhall South
Party	Candidate	Votes	%	±%
Labour	D. Peutherer	603	37.9	▼15.1
SNP	R. Hetmanczyk	580	36.5	New
Conservative	A. Keg	301	18.9	▼4.9
Liberal	R. Wilkinson	105	6.6	▼16.6
Majority		23	1.4	▼27.8
Turnout		1,589	51.2	▼1.6
Registered electors		3,105		
Labour hold		Swing	▼25.8	

=== Low Waters ===
Low Waters
Party	Candidate	Votes	%	±%
Conservative	D. Williamson	1,587	60.6	▼6.3
SNP	A. McGubbin	538	20.5	New
Labour	W. Cochrane	494	18.9	▼14.2
Majority		1,049	40.1	▲6.3
Turnout		2,619	56.2	▲0.2
Registered electors		4,665		
Conservative hold		Swing	▼6.3	

=== Cadzow ===
Cadzow
Party	Candidate	Votes	%	±%
SNP	I. Campbell	1,080	36.9	New
Labour	J. Brownlie	925	31.6	▼32.2
Conservative	J. Dorricott	919	31.4	▼4.8
Majority		155	5.3	N/A
Turnout		2,924	51.5	▲3.2
Registered electors		5,693		
SNP gain from Labour		Swing	▲34.5	

=== Dalserf ===
Dalserf
Party	Candidate	Votes	%	±%
SNP	D. Broadfoot	1,024	56.4	▲20.6
Labour	M. Grove	793	43.6	▼1.3
Majority		231	12.8	N/A
Turnout		1,817	48.2	▼3.1
Registered electors		3,782		
SNP gain from Labour		Swing	▲20.6	

=== Machan ===
Machan
Party	Candidate	Votes	%	±%
SNP	M. Miller	1,117	53.7	▲11.8
Labour	J. Hunter	785	37.8	▼5.0
Independent	A. Clelland	177	8.5	New
Majority		332	15.9	N/A
Turnout		2,079	47.4	▼6.5
Registered electors		4,389		
SNP gain from Labour		Swing	▲11.8	

=== Avonholm ===
Avonholm
Party	Candidate	Votes	%	±%
Labour	J. Speirs	698	47.5	▲8.1
SNP	A. Douglas	529	36.0	▲12.5
Independent	J. McLean	244	16.6	New
Majority		169	11.5	▲9.2
Turnout		1,471	50.1	▼7.0
Registered electors		2,948		
Labour hold		Swing	▲8.1	

=== Strutherhill ===
Strutherhill
Party	Candidate	Votes	%	±%
Labour	S. Casserly	792	54.3	▲10.3
SNP	A. Broadfoot	432	29.6	▲13.7
Independent	W. Little	235	16.1	New
Majority		360	24.7	▲20.8
Turnout		1,459	56.8	▼5.2
Registered electors		2,583		
Labour hold		Swing	▲10.3	

=== Stonehouse ===
Stonehouse
Party	Candidate	Votes	%	±%
Labour	R. Gibb	1,162	56.3	▲21.2
Independent	M. Burns	902	43.7	▲3.7
Majority		260	6.6	N/A
Turnout		2,064	57.7	▼2.5
Registered electors		5,077		
Labour gain from Independent		Swing	▲8.7	

=== Bothwell and Uddingston North ===
Bothwell and Uddingston North
Party	Candidate	Votes	%	±%
Liberal	T. Maxwell	911	45.5	▲1.5
Labour	S. Sloss	653	32.6	▼5.3
Conservative	J. Bain	440	22.0	New
Majority		258	12.9	▲6.8
Turnout		2,004	57.8	▼4.2
Registered electors		3,487		
Liberal hold		Swing	▲3.4	

=== Bothwell and Uddingston South ===
Bothwell and Uddingston South
Party	Candidate	Votes	%	±%
Liberal	T. Grieve	1,501	60.9	▼7.2
Conservative	A. Thomson	669	27.2	▲13.7
Labour	J. Weir	293	11.9	▼0.2
Majority		832	33.7	▼20.9
Turnout		2,463	62.3	▼4.3
Registered electors		3,964		
Liberal hold		Swing	▼10.4	

=== High Blantyre ===
High Blantyre
Party	Candidate	Votes	%	±%
Labour	J. Swinburne	1,290	53.2	▼2.5
SNP	D. Crawford	1,133	46.8	▲2.5
Majority		157	6.4	▼5.0
Turnout		2,423	51.5	▲0.5
Registered electors		4,710		
Labour hold		Swing	▲2.5	

=== Blantyre ===
Blantyre
Party	Candidate	Votes	%	±%
Labour	M. D. Tremble	1,608	61.2	▲4.9
SNP	J. Waugh	1,019	38.8	▼4.9
Majority		589	22.4	▲9.8
Turnout		2,627	55.5	▲0.6
Registered electors		4,784		
Labour hold		Swing	▲4.9	

=== Stonefield ===
Stonefield
Party	Candidate	Votes	%	±%
Labour	G. McInally	1,679	67.3	▲6.1
SNP	E. Stewart	814	32.7	▼0.7
Majority		865	34.6	▲6.8
Turnout		2,493	56.2	▼1.5
Registered electors		4,469		
Labour hold		Swing	▲6.1	
