= 1980 Hamilton District Council election =

Hamilton District Council election

← 1977	1 May 1980	1984 →

All 20 seats to Hamilton District Council 11 seats needed for a majority
- Registered: 78,670
- Turnout: 50.2%
	First party	Second party	Third party
	Lab	Lib	Con
Party	Labour	Liberal	Conservative
Last election	10 seats, 42.1%	2 seats, 6.2%	1 seat, 12.6%
Seats won	17	2	1
Seat change	▲7	Steady	Steady
Popular vote	15,648	2,849	6,093
Percentage	56.5%	10.3%	22.0%
Swing	▲14.4	▲4.1	▲9.4
Council Leader before election
No overall control
Council Leader after election
Labour

Elections to Hamilton District Council were held on 1 May 1980, on the same day as the other Scottish local government elections. This was the third election to the district council following the local government reforms in the 1970s.

The election was the last to use the original 20 wards created by the Formation Electoral Arrangements in 1974. Each ward elected one councillor using first-past-the-post voting. Following the Initial Statutory Reviews of Electoral Arrangements in October 1981, several wards were changed or abolished.

Labour regained overall control of the council after winning 17 seats – an increase of seven from the previous election – and taking more than half of the popular vote. The Liberals leapfrogged the Scottish National Party (SNP) into second as they maintained their total of two councillors and the Conservatives won the remaining seat to maintain their number on the council. The SNP lost all six of their seats as their vote share fell by 25 percentage points.

== Results ==
1980 Hamilton District Council election result
Party	Seats	Gains	Losses	Net gain/loss	Seats %	Votes %	Votes	+/−
Labour	17	7	0	▲7	85.0	56.5	15,648	▲14.4
Liberal	2	0	0	Steady	10.0	10.3	2,849	▲4.1
Conservative	1	0	0	Steady	5.0	22.0	6,093	▲9.4
SNP	0	0	6	▼6	0.0	8.3	2,290	▼24.8
Independent Labour	0	0	1	▼1	0.0	2.3	658	▲0.8
Independent Nationalist	0	0	0	Steady	0.0	0.6	178	New
Total	20						27,716	

== Ward results ==
=== Hillhouse ===
Hillhouse
Party	Candidate	Votes	%	±%
Labour	R. Newberry	1,206	81.7	▲34.2
Independent Nationalist	M. Sneddon	178	12.1	New
Conservative	D. Ogg	91	6.2	New
Majority		1,028	69.6	N/A
Turnout		1,475	46.3	▼4.1
Registered electors		3,139		
Labour gain from SNP		Swing	▲34.2	

=== Udston ===
Udston
Party	Candidate	Votes	%	±%
Labour	S. Dallas	1,473	85.1	▲52.7
Independent Labour	A. Reid	248	14.3	▼23.7
Majority		1,225	70.8	N/A
Turnout		1,721	52.3	▲0.3
Registered electors		3,308		
Labour gain from Independent Labour		Swing	▲52.7	

=== Wellhall North ===
Wellhall North
Party	Candidate	Votes	%	±%
Labour	B. McKinnon	800	49.5	▲22.8
Conservative	A. Aitchison	429	26.5	▲1.2
SNP	A. McCubbin	387	23.9	▼18.0
Majority		371	23.0	N/A
Turnout		1,616	50.4	▼3.4
Registered electors		3,206		
Labour gain from SNP		Swing	▲20.4	

=== Central ===
Central
Party	Candidate	Votes	%	±%
Labour	T. Murphy	771	63.9	▲25.7
Conservative	M. Stepek	432	35.8	▲7.4
Majority		339	28.1	▲23.2
Turnout		1,203	50.5	▼4.4
Registered electors		2,392		
Labour hold		Swing	▲25.7	

=== Burnbank ===
Burnbank
Party	Candidate	Votes	%	±%
Labour	I. McKillop	1,416	69.5	▲8.1
Independent Labour	A. Hosie	410	20.1	New
Conservative	J. Urquhart	208	10.2	New
Majority		1,006	49.4	▲23.1
Turnout		2,034	51.8	▲4.6
Registered electors		3,936		
Labour hold		Swing	▲8.1	

=== Bent ===
Bent
Party	Candidate	Votes	%	±%
Labour	J. Lowe	806	49.5	▲24.8
Conservative	A. Kegg	502	30.8	▲8.0
SNP	T. Fox	319	19.6	▼32.8
Majority		304	18.7	N/A
Turnout		1,627	50.8	▼4.4
Registered electors		3,205		
Labour gain from SNP		Swing	▲28.8	

=== Fairhill ===
Fairhill
Party	Candidate	Votes	%	±%
Labour	N. Cochrane	1,941	84.4	▲29.8
Conservative	D. Murray	356	15.5	New
Majority		1,585	68.9	▲56.5
Turnout		2,297	44.9	▼6.0
Registered electors		5,125		
Labour hold		Swing	▲29.8	

=== Wellhall South ===
Wellhall South
Party	Candidate	Votes	%	±%
Labour	D. Puetherer	1,250	80.6	▲42.7
Conservative	G. Young	290	18.7	▼0.2
Majority		960	61.9	▲60.5
Turnout		1,540	42.7	▼8.5
Registered electors		3,634		
Labour hold		Swing	▲42.7	

=== Low Waters ===
Low Waters
Party	Candidate	Votes	%	±%
Conservative	D. Williamson	1,681	63.1	▲2.5
Labour	P. Grenfell	976	36.6	▲17.7
Majority		705	26.5	▼13.6
Turnout		2,657	55.3	▼0.9
Registered electors		4,823		
Conservative hold		Swing	▲2.5	

=== Cadzow ===
Cadzow
Party	Candidate	Votes	%	±%
Labour	G. Smith	2,032	58.7	▲27.1
Conservative	J. Dorricott	736	21.3	▼10.1
SNP	I. Campbell	691	20.0	▼16.9
Majority		1,296	37.4	N/A
Turnout		3,459	56.4	▲5.3
Registered electors		6,143		
Labour gain from SNP		Swing	▲27.1	

=== Dalserf ===
Dalserf
Party	Candidate	Votes	%	±%
Labour	W. Cochrane	1,025	59.7	▲16.1
SNP	D. Broadfoot	346	20.2	▼36.2
Conservative	J. Newton	344	20.0	New
Majority		679	39.5	N/A
Turnout		1,715	45.9	▼2.3
Registered electors		3,742		
Labour gain from SNP		Swing	▲16.1	

=== Machan ===
Machan
Party	Candidate	Votes	%	±%
Labour	J. Borland	1,131	55.6	▲17.8
SNP	M. Miller	547	26.9	▼26.8
Conservative	D. Eadie	353	17.4	New
Majority		584	28.7	N/A
Turnout		2,031	45.3	▼2.1
Registered electors		4,493		
Labour gain from SNP		Swing	▲17.8	

=== Avonholm ===
Avonholm
Party	Candidate	Votes	%
Labour	J. Speirs	Unopposed	
Registered electors		3,017	
Labour hold			

=== Strutherhill ===
Strutherhill
Party	Candidate	Votes	%
Labour	S. Casserley	Unopposed	
Registered electors		2,463	
Labour hold			

=== Stonehouse ===
Stonehouse
Party	Candidate	Votes	%
Labour	R. Gibb	Unopposed	
Registered electors		3,757	
Labour hold			

=== Bothwell and Uddingston North ===
Bothwell and Uddingston North
Party	Candidate	Votes	%	±%
Liberal	T. Maxwell	1,080	51.6	▲6.1
Labour	S. Sloss	821	39.2	▲6.6
Conservative	J. Bain	191	9.1	▼12.9
Majority		259	12.4	▼0.5
Turnout		2,092	56.8	▼1.0
Registered electors		3,685		
Liberal hold		Swing	▲6.1	

=== Bothwell and Uddingston South ===
Bothwell and Uddingston South
Party	Candidate	Votes	%	±%
Liberal	T. Grieve	1,769	78.3	▲17.4
Conservative	A. Thomson	480	21.3	▼5.9
Majority		1,289	57.0	▲24.3
Turnout		2,249	50.6	▼11.7
Registered electors		4,459		
Liberal hold		Swing	▲17.4	

=== High Blantyre ===
High Blantyre
Party	Candidate	Votes	%
Labour	J. Swinburne	Unopposed	
Registered electors		4,951	
Labour hold			

=== Blantyre ===
Blantyre
Party	Candidate	Votes	%
Labour	M. D. Tremble	Unopposed	
Registered electors		4,718	
Labour hold			

=== Stonefield ===
Stonefield
Party	Candidate	Votes	%
Labour	G. McInally	Unopposed	
Registered electors		4,474	
Labour hold			
