= 1995 South Lanarkshire Council election =

South Lanarkshire Council election

- 6 April 1995

All 73 seats to South Lanarkshire Council 37 seats needed for a majority
| | First party | Second party |
|---|---|---|
| | Lab | SNP |
| Leader | Tom McCabe |
| Party | Labour | SNP |
| Leader's seat | Larkhall West |
| Last election | 37 seats, 45.5% | 6 seats, 25.3% |
| Seats won | 60 | 8 |
| Seat change | ▲23 | ▲2 |
| Popular vote | 61,452 | 28,918 |
| Percentage | 57.1% | 26.9% |
| Swing | ▲11.6 | ▲1.6 |
| | Third party | Fourth party |
| | LD | Con |
| Party | Liberal Democrats | Conservative |
| Last election | 3 seats, 9.6% | 7 seats, 15.8% |
| Seats won | 2 | 2 |
| Seat change | ▼1 | ▼5 |
| Popular vote | 7,705 | 7,559 |
| Percentage | 7.1% | 7.0% |
| Swing | ▼2.5 | ▼8.8 |
Council Leader after election
Tom McCabe
Labour

The first elections to South Lanarkshire Council were held on 6 April 1995, on the same day as the 28 other Scottish local government elections. The council was created from the former Clydesdale, East Kilbride and Hamilton district councils plus the four wards of the City of Glasgow District Council in Rutherglen and Cambuslang and assumed some of the responsibilities of the former Strathclyde Regional Council following the implementation of the Local Government etc. (Scotland) Act 1994.

The election was the first since the Second Statutory Reviews of Electoral Arrangements which was initially meant to decide boundaries for the district and regional councils. After the district councils were abolished by the Local Government etc. (Scotland) Act 1994, the review was instead used to decide boundaries for the newly created unitary authority in Clydesdale, East Kilbride and Hamilton. As a result, there remained 16 seats covering the former Clydesdale District while 20 seats were established for the former East Kilbride District, an increase of four, and 25 seats were established for the former Hamilton District, five more than had been in use since the Initial Statutory Reviews of Electoral Arrangements in 1981. In Rutherglen and Cambuslang, the proposed new wards were disregarded by Parliamentary Under-Secretary of State for Scotland Allan Stewart who created 13 new wards.

Labour took control of the council after winning 60 of the 72 wards which were up for election. The Scottish National Party (SNP) took eight seats while the Liberal Democrats and Conservatives both won two seats.

== Results ==
1995 South Lanarkshire Council election result
| Party | Seats | Gains | Losses | Net gain/loss | Seats % | Votes % | Votes | +/− |
|---|---|---|---|---|---|---|---|---|
| Labour | 60 | | | ▲23 | 83.3 | 57.1 | 61,452 | ▲11.6 |
| SNP | 8 | | | ▲2 | 11.1 | 26.9 | 28,918 | ▲1.6 |
| Liberal Democrats | 2 | | | ▼1 | 2.7 | 7.1 | 7,705 | ▼2.5 |
| Conservative | 2 | | | ▼5 | 2.7 | 7.0 | 7,559 | ▼8.8 |
| Independent | 0 | | | ▼1 | 0.0 | 0.9 | 997 | ▼0.4 |
| Independent Labour | 0 | | | Steady | 0.0 | 0.8 | 906 | New |
| Progressive | 0 | | | Steady | 0.0 | 0.2 | 219 | New |
| Communist | 0 | | | Steady | 0.0 | 0.1 | 77 | New |
| Vacant | 1 | | | ▲1 | 1.3 | N/A | N/A | N/A |
| Total | 73 | | | | | | 107,833 | |

Notes:

- Net gains/losses are compared against the combined results of the Hamilton, East Kilbride, Clydesdale and City of Glasgow district council wards which became South Lanarkshire following the implementation of the Local Government etc. (Scotland) Act 1994.
- Only 72 of the 73 seats were up for election after the election in Forth was postponed following the death of a candidate.

== Ward results ==
=== Lanark North ===
Lanark North
| Party | Candidate | Votes | % | ±% |
|---|---|---|---|---|
| Labour | J. Millar | 910 | 48.0 | ▲9.4 |
| Conservative | D. Fanshawe | 531 | 28.0 | ▼18.7 |
| SNP | D. Richardson | 240 | 12.7 | ▼1.9 |
| Independent | I. Edwards | 136 | 7.2 | New |
| Liberal Democrats | R. Waddell | 78 | 4.8 | New |
| Majority | | 379 | 20.0 | N/A |
| Turnout | | 1,895 | 50.9 | ▲3.6 |
| Registered electors | | 3,720 | | |
| Labour gain from Conservative | | Swing | ▲14.0 | |

=== Lanark South ===
Lanark South
| Party | Candidate | Votes | % | ±% |
|---|---|---|---|---|
| Labour | D. McDonald | 842 | 49.7 | ▲6.4 |
| Independent | M. Frood | 435 | 25.7 | New |
| SNP | R. Harris | 260 | 15.4 | ▲1.9 |
| Independent | J. Denholm | 107 | 6.3 | New |
| Liberal Democrats | S. Grieve | 49 | 2.9 | New |
| Majority | | 407 | 24.0 | ▲23.8 |
| Turnout | | 1,693 | 50.6 | ▲6.2 |
| Registered electors | | 3,354 | | |
| Labour hold | | Swing | ▲24.7 | |

=== Lesmahagow ===
Lesmahagow
| Party | Candidate | Votes | % | ±% |
|---|---|---|---|---|
| Labour | R. McMillan | 1,199 | 86.3 | ▲5.3 |
| SNP | M. Rae | 190 | 13.7 | ▼5.0 |
| Majority | | 1,009 | 72.6 | ▲10.3 |
| Turnout | | 1,389 | 45.5 | ▲3.4 |
| Registered electors | | 3,056 | | |
| Labour hold | | Swing | ▲5.1 | |

=== Blackwood ===
Blackwood
| Party | Candidate | Votes | % | ±% |
|---|---|---|---|---|
| Labour | E. Serrels | 1,024 | 71.0 | ▲6.5 |
| SNP | J. Rae | 304 | 21.1 | ▼14.4 |
| Conservative | T. MacInnes | 115 | 8.0 | New |
| Majority | | 720 | 49.9 | ▲20.9 |
| Turnout | | 1,443 | 45.0 | ▲4.5 |
| Registered electors | | 3,210 | | |
| Labour hold | | Swing | ▲10.4 | |

=== Clyde Valley ===
Clyde Valley
| Party | Candidate | Votes | % | ±% |
|---|---|---|---|---|
| SNP | C. Winning | 499 | 48.4 | ▲10.9 |
| Labour | A. Clark | 311 | 30.2 | ▲1.9 |
| Conservative | J. MacInnes | 221 | 21.4 | ▼12.7 |
| Majority | | 188 | 18.2 | ▲14.8 |
| Turnout | | 1,031 | 46.4 | ▲3.0 |
| Registered electors | | 2,223 | | |
| SNP hold | | Swing | ▲11.8 | |

=== Biggar ===
Biggar
| Party | Candidate | Votes | % | ±% |
|---|---|---|---|---|
| SNP | T. McAlpine | 656 | 58.8 | ▼11.1 |
| Conservative | C. Thorpe | 460 | 41.2 | ▲17.3 |
| Majority | | 196 | 17.6 | ▼23.2 |
| Turnout | | 1,116 | 58.8 | ▲1.6 |
| Registered electors | | 1,899 | | |
| SNP hold | | Swing | ▼14.2 | |

=== Duneaton ===
Duneaton
| Party | Candidate | Votes | % | ±% |
|---|---|---|---|---|
| Conservative | A. Forrest | 463 | 54.9 | ▼19.2 |
| Labour | R. Barker | 198 | 23.4 | ▲11.4 |
| SNP | A. Lauder | 182 | 21.5 | ▲7.8 |
| Majority | | 265 | 31.5 | ▼28.9 |
| Turnout | | 843 | 60.9 | ▲16.8 |
| Registered electors | | 1,682 | | |
| Conservative hold | | Swing | ▼15.3 | |

=== Carnwath ===
Carnwath
| Party | Candidate | Votes | % | ±% |
|---|---|---|---|---|
| SNP | B. Gauld | 669 | 55.7 | ▲29.6 |
| Conservative | M. Ashmore | 389 | 32.4 | New |
| Independent | S. Cousins | 144 | 12.0 | New |
| Majority | | 280 | 23.3 | N/A |
| Turnout | | 1,202 | 49.2 | ▲3.2 |
| Registered electors | | 2,444 | | |
| SNP gain from Independent | | Swing | ▲38.3 | |

=== Carmichael ===
Carmichael
| Party | Candidate | Votes | % | ±% |
|---|---|---|---|---|
| Labour | V. Montgomery | 529 | 42.4 | ▲7.4 |
| Conservative | P. Ross-Taylor | 491 | 39.4 | ▼3.5 |
| SNP | A. Bain | 227 | 18.2 | ▼3.9 |
| Majority | | 38 | 3.0 | N/A |
| Turnout | | 1,247 | 48.9 | ▲4.1 |
| Registered electors | | 2,552 | | |
| Labour gain from Conservative | | Swing | ▲5.4 | |

=== Douglas ===
Douglas
| Party | Candidate | Votes | % | ±% |
|---|---|---|---|---|
| Labour | D. Meikle | 1,031 | 54.1 | ▲6.2 |
| Independent Labour | A. Lawson | 601 | 31.5 | New |
| SNP | J. Semple | 273 | 14.3 | ▼37.4 |
| Majority | | 430 | 22.6 | N/A |
| Turnout | | 1,905 | 68.3 | ▲15.3 |
| Registered electors | | 2,789 | | |
| Labour gain from SNP | | Swing | ▲21.8 | |

=== Lanark/Carstairs ===
Lanark/Carstairs
| Party | Candidate | Votes | % | ±% |
|---|---|---|---|---|
| Labour | M. P. Wardlaw | 715 | 68.4 | ▲28.4 |
| SNP | J. Yuill | 203 | 19.4 | ▼0.2 |
| Independent | J. Muncie | 66 | 6.3 | New |
| Liberal Democrats | D. Hill | 61 | 5.8 | New |
| Majority | | 512 | 49.0 | N/A |
| Turnout | | 1,045 | 47.5 | ▼0.3 |
| Registered electors | | 2,201 | | |
| Labour gain from Independent | | Swing | ▲34.3 | |

=== Carluke/Whitehill ===
Carluke/Whitehill
| Party | Candidate | Votes | % | ±% |
|---|---|---|---|---|
| Labour | E. Logan | 1,268 | 77.9 | ▲13.1 |
| SNP | E. McFarlane | 359 | 22.1 | ▼12.1 |
| Majority | | 909 | 55.8 | ▲25.2 |
| Turnout | | 1,627 | 48.9 | ▲0.1 |
| Registered electors | | 3,327 | | |
| Labour hold | | Swing | ▲12.6 | |

=== Carluke/Crawforddyke ===
Carluke/Crawforddyke
| Party | Candidate | Votes | % | ±% |
|---|---|---|---|---|
| Labour | W. Ross | 1,100 | 55.4 | ▲11.0 |
| SNP | J. Allan | 700 | 35.3 | ▼9.0 |
| Conservative | J. Young | 97 | 4.9 | ▼6.4 |
| Independent | W. Campbell | 87 | 4.4 | New |
| Majority | | 400 | 20.1 | ▲20.0 |
| Turnout | | 1,984 | 53.9 | ▲2.2 |
| Registered electors | | 3,682 | | |
| Labour hold | | Swing | ▲10.0 | |

=== Carluke West ===
Carluke West
| Party | Candidate | Votes | % | ±% |
|---|---|---|---|---|
| SNP | I. Gray | 925 | 58.0 | ▲15.1 |
| Labour | D. McNeil | 499 | 31.3 | ▼3.6 |
| Conservative | S. Duncan | 172 | 10.8 | ▼11.3 |
| Majority | | 426 | 26.7 | ▲18.7 |
| Turnout | | 1,596 | 46.9 | ▼1.2 |
| Registered electors | | 3,401 | | |
| SNP hold | | Swing | ▲9.3 | |

=== Forth ===
Following the death of SNP candidate Mary Ann Tait, the election in Forth was postponed and a by-election was held on 8 June 1995.

=== Law/Carluke ===
Law/Carluke
| Party | Candidate | Votes | % | ±% |
|---|---|---|---|---|
| SNP | D. R. Shearer | 959 | 58.3 | ▲10.3 |
| Labour | J. Watson | 685 | 41.7 | ▼5.3 |
| Majority | | 274 | 16.6 | N/A |
| Turnout | | 1,644 | 54.9 | ▲17.6 |
| Registered electors | | 2,996 | | |
| SNP gain from Labour | | Swing | ▲7.8 | |

=== Long Calderwood ===
Long Calderwood
| Party | Candidate | Votes | % | ±% |
|---|---|---|---|---|
| Labour | R. Boyle | 858 | 61.5 | ▲11.2 |
| SNP | M. Bowman | 488 | 32.1 | ▼2.9 |
| Liberal Democrats | A. Brash | 89 | 6.4 | New |
| Majority | | 410 | 29.4 | ▲14.1 |
| Turnout | | 1,395 | 46.5 | ▲8.6 |
| Registered electors | | 3,001 | | |
| Labour hold | | Swing | ▲7.0 | |

=== Calderglen ===
Calderglen
| Party | Candidate | Votes | % | ±% |
|---|---|---|---|---|
| Labour | H. H. Biggins | 892 | 64.9 | ▲26.3 |
| SNP | J. MacQueen | 365 | 26.5 | ▲1.7 |
| Liberal Democrats | P. Ladybourn | 61 | 4.4 | ▼11.7 |
| Conservative | A. Ferguson | 57 | 4.1 | ▼16.3 |
| Majority | | 527 | 38.4 | ▲24.6 |
| Turnout | | 1,375 | 44.1 | ▲5.2 |
| Registered electors | | 3,115 | | |
| Labour hold | | Swing | ▲12.3 | |

=== Blacklaw ===
Blacklaw
| Party | Candidate | Votes | % | ±% |
|---|---|---|---|---|
| Labour | A. Maggs | 983 | 67.0 | ▲19.7 |
| SNP | A. R. Sharp | 383 | 26.1 | ▼3.5 |
| Liberal Democrats | L. Brash | 101 | 6.9 | ▼1.8 |
| Majority | | 600 | 40.9 | ▲23.2 |
| Turnout | | 1,467 | 45.7 | ▲7.1 |
| Registered electors | | 3,207 | | |
| Labour hold | | Swing | ▲11.6 | |

=== Whitemoss ===
Whitemoss
| Party | Candidate | Votes | % |
|---|---|---|---|
| Labour | C. Robb | 1,016 | 65.7 |
| SNP | R. Littler | 530 | 34.3 |
| Majority | | 486 | 31.4 |
| Turnout | | 1,546 | 47.6 |
| Registered electors | | 3,251 | |
| Labour win (new seat) | | | |

=== Morrishall ===
Morrishall
| Party | Candidate | Votes | % | ±% |
|---|---|---|---|---|
| Labour | A. Dick | 1,099 | 70.9 | ▲21.8 |
| SNP | A. Brown | 452 | 29.1 | ▼6.1 |
| Majority | | 647 | 41.8 | ▲27.9 |
| Turnout | | 1,451 | 49.5 | ▲11.2 |
| Registered electors | | 3,135 | | |
| Labour hold | | Swing | ▲13.9 | |

=== Maxwellton ===
Maxwellton
| Party | Candidate | Votes | % | ±% |
|---|---|---|---|---|
| Labour | C. Thompson | 1,152 | 64.5 | ▲3.9 |
| SNP | D. McAnsh | 437 | 24.5 | ▲7.8 |
| Conservative | E. Kay | 121 | 6.8 | ▼15.9 |
| Liberal Democrats | H. Cruden | 75 | 4.2 | New |
| Majority | | 715 | 40.0 | ▲2.1 |
| Turnout | | 1,785 | 55.0 | ▲12.5 |
| Registered electors | | 3,248 | | |
| Labour hold | | Swing | ▲4.0 | |

=== East Mains ===
East Mains
| Party | Candidate | Votes | % | ±% |
|---|---|---|---|---|
| Labour | H. Winslow | 1,212 | 69.0 | ▲20.8 |
| SNP | M. Gillespie | 422 | 24.0 | ▼0.5 |
| Liberal Democrats | K. Morris | 123 | 7.0 | ▼1.7 |
| Majority | | 790 | 45.0 | ▲21.3 |
| Turnout | | 1,757 | 54.2 | ▲12.1 |
| Registered electors | | 3,239 | | |
| Labour hold | | Swing | ▲10.6 | |

=== West Mains ===
West Mains
| Party | Candidate | Votes | % | ±% |
|---|---|---|---|---|
| Labour | W. McNab | 1,251 | 69.6 | ▲22.6 |
| SNP | M. Henderson | 468 | 26.0 | ▼16.5 |
| Liberal Democrats | M. Dunbar | 79 | 4.4 | ▼0.8 |
| Majority | | 783 | 43.6 | ▲26.8 |
| Turnout | | 1,798 | 53.5 | ▲15.1 |
| Registered electors | | 3,358 | | |
| Labour hold | | Swing | ▲19.5 | |

=== Duncanrig ===
Duncanrig
| Party | Candidate | Votes | % | ±% |
|---|---|---|---|---|
| Labour | S. Crawford | 1,101 | 67.5 | ▲13.1 |
| SNP | D. Molloy | 467 | 28.7 | ▼6.2 |
| Liberal Democrats | M. Sutherland | 62 | 3.8 | ▼6.2 |
| Majority | | 634 | 38.8 | ▲19.3 |
| Turnout | | 1,630 | 48.5 | ▲9.4 |
| Registered electors | | 3,358 | | |
| Labour hold | | Swing | ▲9.6 | |

=== Westwoodhill ===
Westwoodhill
| Party | Candidate | Votes | % | ±% |
|---|---|---|---|---|
| Labour | J. Pieper | 825 | 56.4 | ▲9.3 |
| SNP | J. Anderson | 638 | 43.6 | ▲1.1 |
| Majority | | 187 | 12.8 | ▲8.2 |
| Turnout | | 1,463 | 46.8 | ▲8.5 |
| Registered electors | | 3,123 | | |
| Labour hold | | Swing | ▲4.1 | |

=== Headhouse ===
Headhouse
| Party | Candidate | Votes | % | ±% |
|---|---|---|---|---|
| Labour | J. McMonigle | 1,020 | 70.9 | ▲21.7 |
| SNP | C. Cameron | 419 | 29.1 | ▼3.3 |
| Majority | | 601 | 41.8 | ▲25.0 |
| Turnout | | 1,439 | 46.7 | ▲9.4 |
| Registered electors | | 3,083 | | |
| Labour hold | | Swing | ▲12.5 | |

=== Kelvin ===
Kelvin
| Party | Candidate | Votes | % | ±% |
|---|---|---|---|---|
| Labour | J. Docherty | 1,065 | 73.4 | ▲10.5 |
| SNP | J. Wilson | 385 | 26.6 | ▼10.0 |
| Majority | | 680 | 46.8 | ▲20.5 |
| Turnout | | 1,450 | 42.9 | ▲7.1 |
| Registered electors | | 3,381 | | |
| Labour hold | | Swing | ▲10.2 | |

=== The Murray ===
The Murray
| Party | Candidate | Votes | % |
|---|---|---|---|
| Labour | G. Convery | 1,001 | 61.3 |
| SNP | W. Johnston | 631 | 38.7 |
| Majority | | 370 | 22.6 |
| Turnout | | 1,632 | 52.7 |
| Registered electors | | 3,098 | |
| Labour win (new seat) | | | |

=== Greenhills ===
Greenhills
| Party | Candidate | Votes | % |
|---|---|---|---|
| Labour | P. Watters | 827 | 67.1 |
| SNP | D. Scott | 405 | 32.9 |
| Majority | | 422 | 34.2 |
| Turnout | | 1,232 | 39.6 |
| Registered electors | | 3,111 | |
| Labour win (new seat) | | | |

=== Lickprivick ===
Lickprivick
| Party | Candidate | Votes | % | ±% |
|---|---|---|---|---|
| SNP | A. Buchanan | 836 | 54.6 | ▲15.6 |
| Labour | A. Reid | 674 | 44.0 | ▼10.6 |
| Independent | W. Russell | 22 | 1.4 | New |
| Majority | | 162 | 10.6 | N/A |
| Turnout | | 1,532 | 42.5 | ▲9.8 |
| Registered electors | | 3,604 | | |
| SNP gain from Labour | | Swing | ▲13.1 | |

=== Hairmyres ===
Hairmyres
| Party | Candidate | Votes | % | ±% |
|---|---|---|---|---|
| SNP | D. Watson | 747 | 49.3 | ▲15.0 |
| Labour | P. Cowan | 632 | 41.7 | ▲10.9 |
| Conservative | J. Davidson | 93 | 6.1 | ▼21.5 |
| Liberal Democrats | C. Linskey | 42 | 2.8 | ▲4.5 |
| Majority | | 115 | 7.6 | ▲4.1 |
| Turnout | | 1,514 | 41.3 | ▲5.3 |
| Registered electors | | 3,670 | | |
| SNP hold | | Swing | ▲2.0 | |

=== Stewartfield ===
Stewartfield
| Party | Candidate | Votes | % |
|---|---|---|---|
| Labour | C. Bright | 764 | 51.5 |
| SNP | P. M. Henderson | 478 | 32.2 |
| Conservative | L. Kay | 149 | 10.0 |
| Liberal Democrats | A. Cruden | 92 | 6.2 |
| Majority | | 286 | 19.3 |
| Turnout | | 1,483 | 41.5 |
| Registered electors | | 3,577 | |
| Labour win (new seat) | | | |

=== Lindsay ===
Lindsay
| Party | Candidate | Votes | % |
|---|---|---|---|
| Labour | G. Scott | 478 | 39.8 |
| SNP | J. Reilly | 375 | 31.2 |
| Conservative | N. Craig | 259 | 21.5 |
| Liberal Democrats | D. Service | 90 | 7.5 |
| Majority | | 103 | 8.6 |
| Turnout | | 1,202 | 41.6 |
| Registered electors | | 2,891 | |
| Labour win (new seat) | | | |

=== Avondale North ===
Avondale North
| Party | Candidate | Votes | % | ±% |
|---|---|---|---|---|
| Labour | J. Molloy | 619 | 38.5 | ▲18.5 |
| Conservative | M. Cameron | 536 | 33.3 | ▼24.4 |
| SNP | C. Boyle | 365 | 22.7 | ▲7.0 |
| Liberal Democrats | G. R. Campbell | 88 | 5.5 | ▼1.0 |
| Majority | | 83 | 5.2 | N/A |
| Turnout | | 1,608 | 46.6 | ▲7.0 |
| Registered electors | | 3,450 | | |
| Labour gain from Conservative | | Swing | ▲21.4 | |

=== Avondale South ===
Avondale South
| Party | Candidate | Votes | % | ±% |
|---|---|---|---|---|
| Conservative | H. MacDonald | 476 | 32.6 | ▼28.6 |
| Labour | A. Kerr | 457 | 31.3 | ▲11.5 |
| SNP | J. Dey | 444 | 30.4 | ▲10.4 |
| Liberal Democrats | D. Service | 85 | 5.8 | New |
| Majority | | 19 | 1.3 | ▼40.1 |
| Turnout | | 1,462 | 41.1 | ▲2.8 |
| Registered electors | | 3,557 | | |
| Conservative hold | | Swing | ▼20.0 | |

=== Blantyre West ===
Blantyre West
| Party | Candidate | Votes | % |
|---|---|---|---|
| Labour | M. McGlynn | 815 | 63.0 |
| SNP | V. Dow | 259 | 20.0 |
| Progressive | C. Fulston | 219 | 16.9 |
| Majority | | 556 | 43.0 |
| Turnout | | 1,293 | 41.8 |
| Registered electors | | 3,093 | |
| Labour win (new seat) | | | |

=== Coatshill/Low Blantyre ===
Coatshill/Low Blantyre
| Party | Candidate | Votes | % |
|---|---|---|---|
| Labour | J. Handibode | 898 | 65.7 |
| Independent Labour | M. D. Tremble | 305 | 22.3 |
| SNP | K. Neary | 163 | 11.9 |
| Majority | | 593 | 43.4 |
| Turnout | | 1,366 | 47.7 |
| Registered electors | | 2,863 | |
| Labour win (new seat) | | | |

=== Blantyre/Stonefield ===
Blantyre/Stonefield
| Party | Candidate | Votes | % |
|---|---|---|---|
| Labour | H. Dunsmuir | 1,058 | 76.2 |
| SNP | P. Stewart | 331 | 23.8 |
| Majority | | 727 | 52.4 |
| Turnout | | 1,389 | 42.1 |
| Registered electors | | 3,296 | |
| Labour win (new seat) | | | |

=== Burnbank/Springwells ===
Burnbank/Springwells
| Party | Candidate | Votes | % |
|---|---|---|---|
| Labour | D. McLachlan | 953 | 78.4 |
| SNP | A. Sutherland | 220 | 18.1 |
| Conservative | D. Thomas | 43 | 3.5 |
| Majority | | 733 | 60.3 |
| Turnout | | 1,216 | 36.9 |
| Registered electors | | 3,296 | |
| Labour win (new seat) | | | |

=== High Blantyre ===
High Blantyre
| Party | Candidate | Votes | % | ±% |
|---|---|---|---|---|
| Labour | M. Waugh | 869 | 64.1 | ▲25.6 |
| SNP | J. Henderson | 445 | 32.8 | ▲17.0 |
| Conservative | T. P. Graham | 42 | 3.1 | New |
| Majority | | 424 | 31.3 | N/A |
| Turnout | | 1,356 | 43.8 | ▲2.6 |
| Registered electors | | 3,094 | | |
| Labour gain from Independent Labour | | Swing | ▲35.6 | |

=== Hamilton Centre North ===
Hamilton Centre North
| Party | Candidate | Votes | % |
|---|---|---|---|
| Labour | M. A. Smith | 737 | 55.7 |
| SNP | R. L. Terrett | 338 | 25.5 |
| Conservative | A. Kegg | 248 | 18.7 |
| Majority | | 399 | 30.2 |
| Turnout | | 1,323 | 42.4 |
| Registered electors | | 3,120 | |
| Labour win (new seat) | | | |

=== Whitehill ===
Whitehill
| Party | Candidate | Votes | % |
|---|---|---|---|
| Labour | J. Ward | 959 | 77.4 |
| SNP | W. Neary | 214 | 17.3 |
| Conservative | A. Blair | 66 | 5.3 |
| Majority | | 745 | 60.1 |
| Turnout | | 1,239 | 38.6 |
| Registered electors | | 3,212 | |
| Labour win (new seat) | | | |

=== Bothwell South ===
Bothwell South
| Party | Candidate | Votes | % |
|---|---|---|---|
| Labour | A. McGuire | 706 | 49.6 |
| Conservative | I. S. MacAuslane | 362 | 25.4 |
| SNP | C. Sutherland | 356 | 25.0 |
| Majority | | 344 | 24.2 |
| Turnout | | 1,424 | 44.7 |
| Registered electors | | 3,189 | |
| Labour win (new seat) | | | |

=== Uddingston South/Bothwell ===
Uddingston South/Bothwell
| Party | Candidate | Votes | % |
|---|---|---|---|
| Labour | J. Ormiston | 832 | 58.0 |
| SNP | K. Shaw | 343 | 23.9 |
| Conservative | E. Brownlie | 260 | 18.1 |
| Majority | | 489 | 34.1 |
| Turnout | | 1,435 | 43.4 |
| Registered electors | | 3,304 | |
| Labour win (new seat) | | | |

=== Uddingston North ===
The Uddingston ward was renamed Uddingston North following the Second Statutory Reviews of Electoral Arrangements. There were changes to the boundaries. This was the only time the name Uddingston North was used as it was switched back following the Third Statutory Reviews of Electoral Arrangements ahead of the 1999 election.

Uddingston North
| Party | Candidate | Votes | % | ±% |
|---|---|---|---|---|
| Labour | P. Morgan | 541 | 39.5 | ▲6.8 |
| Liberal Democrats | T. Maxwell | 528 | 38.6 | ▼11.6 |
| SNP | J. Pollock | 185 | 13.5 | New |
| Conservative | E. Montgomery | 115 | 8.4 | ▼8.7 |
| Majority | | 13 | 0.9 | N/A |
| Turnout | | 1,369 | 46.3 | ▲1.6 |
| Registered electors | | 2,954 | | |
| Labour gain from Liberal Democrats | | Swing | ▲9.2 | |

=== Hillhouse ===
Hillhouse
| Party | Candidate | Votes | % | ±% |
|---|---|---|---|---|
| Labour | J. McKeown | 802 | 66.7 | ▼1.1 |
| SNP | J. McGuigan | 401 | 33.3 | ▲1.5 |
| Majority | | 401 | 33.3 | ▼2.7 |
| Turnout | | 1,203 | 43.4 | ▲18.7 |
| Registered electors | | 2,774 | | |
| Labour win (new seat) | | | | |

=== Udston ===
Udston
| Party | Candidate | Votes | % | ±% |
|---|---|---|---|---|
| Labour | J. Daisley | 1,193 | 79.0 | ▲5.4 |
| SNP | K. Darling | 233 | 15.4 | ▼3.7 |
| Conservative | N. Cameron | 85 | 5.6 | New |
| Majority | | 960 | 63.6 | ▲9.1 |
| Turnout | | 1,511 | 44.7 | ▲7.9 |
| Registered electors | | 3,377 | | |
| Labour hold | | Swing | ▲4.5 | |

=== Wellhall/Earnock ===
Wellhall/Earnock
| Party | Candidate | Votes | % |
|---|---|---|---|
| Labour | A. Falconer | 764 | 63.2 |
| SNP | H. Ferguson | 274 | 22.7 |
| Conservative | D. Pirrie | 170 | 14.1 |
| Majority | | 490 | 40.5 |
| Turnout | | 1,208 | 39.6 |
| Registered electors | | 3,048 | |
| Labour win (new seat) | | | |

=== Earnock ===
Earnock
| Party | Candidate | Votes | % |
|---|---|---|---|
| Labour | M. Jakusz | 592 | 50.4 |
| SNP | O. Campbell | 279 | 23.7 |
| Liberal Democrats | J. Oswald | 233 | 19.8 |
| Conservative | G. Green | 71 | 6.0 |
| Majority | | 313 | 26.7 |
| Turnout | | 1,175 | 38.7 |
| Registered electors | | 3,037 | |
| Labour win (new seat) | | | |

=== Laighstonehall/Woodhead ===
The Woodhead ward was renamed Laighstonehall/Woodhead following the Second Statutory Reviews of Electoral Arrangements. There were minor changes to the boundaries.

Laighstonehall/Woodhead
| Party | Candidate | Votes | % | ±% |
|---|---|---|---|---|
| Labour | I. Stewart | 912 | 80.6 | ▲16.1 |
| SNP | D. Keatings | 219 | 19.4 | ▼1.8 |
| Majority | | 693 | 61.2 | ▲18.9 |
| Turnout | | 1,131 | 34.8 | ▲3.7 |
| Registered electors | | 3,252 | | |
| Labour hold | | Swing | ▲8.9 | |

=== Hamilton Centre/Ferniegair ===
Hamilton Centre/Ferniegair
| Party | Candidate | Votes | % |
|---|---|---|---|
| Labour | M. Smith | 678 | 49.9 |
| Conservative | M. Mitchell | 451 | 33.2 |
| SNP | C. Steel | 231 | 17.0 |
| Majority | | 227 | 16.7 |
| Turnout | | 1,360 | 44.7 |
| Registered electors | | 3,040 | |
| Labour win (new seat) | | | |

=== Low Waters ===
Low Waters
| Party | Candidate | Votes | % | ±% |
|---|---|---|---|---|
| Labour | J. Walls | 998 | 66.3 | ▲43.6 |
| SNP | W. Halliday | 368 | 24.5 | ▼6.3 |
| Conservative | I. A. Stewart | 139 | 9.2 | ▼22.5 |
| Majority | | 630 | 41.8 | N/A |
| Turnout | | 1,505 | 45.6 | ▲2.7 |
| Registered electors | | 3,301 | | |
| Labour gain from Conservative | | Swing | ▲33.0 | |

=== Fairhill ===
Fairhill
| Party | Candidate | Votes | % | ±% |
|---|---|---|---|---|
| Labour | J. Lowe | 994 | 79.9 | ▲43.5 |
| SNP | J. Foley | 250 | 20.1 | ▼2.7 |
| Majority | | 744 | 59.8 | ▲56.2 |
| Turnout | | 1,244 | 40.7 | ▼1.0 |
| Registered electors | | 3,053 | | |
| Labour hold | | Swing | ▲23.1 | |

=== Silvertonhill ===
Silvertonhill
| Party | Candidate | Votes | % |
|---|---|---|---|
| SNP | N. Dear | 792 | 46.7 |
| Labour | J. Lee | 625 | 36.8 |
| Conservative | W. Irving | 280 | 16.5 |
| Majority | | 167 | 9.9 |
| Turnout | | 1,697 | 52.4 |
| Registered electors | | 3,240 | |
| SNP win (new seat) | | | |

=== Cadzow ===
Cadzow
| Party | Candidate | Votes | % | ±% |
|---|---|---|---|---|
| Labour | R. McKeown | 1,179 | 60.8 | ▲9.8 |
| SNP | J. Smith | 709 | 36.5 | ▼12.1 |
| Conservative | A. J. Blair | 52 | 2.7 | New |
| Majority | | 470 | 24.3 | ▲11.9 |
| Turnout | | 1,940 | 58.4 | ▲13.9 |
| Registered electors | | 3,324 | | |
| Labour hold | | Swing | ▲10.9 | |

=== Dalserf ===
Dalserf
| Party | Candidate | Votes | % | ±% |
|---|---|---|---|---|
| Labour | M. Ahmad | 918 | 63.9 | ▼3.8 |
| SNP | T. Ashburn | 519 | 36.1 | ▲5.6 |
| Majority | | 399 | 27.8 | ▼9.4 |
| Turnout | | 1,437 | 41.4 | ▲5.7 |
| Registered electors | | 3,472 | | |
| Labour hold | | Swing | ▼4.7 | |

=== Larkhall East ===
Larkhall East
| Party | Candidate | Votes | % | ±% |
|---|---|---|---|---|
| Labour | R. Ferguson | 909 | 60.1 | ▲2.4 |
| SNP | L.McDonald | 603 | 39.9 | ▼5.6 |
| Majority | | 306 | 20.2 | ▲4.0 |
| Turnout | | 1,515 | 40.8 | ▲5.8 |
| Registered electors | | 3,709 | | |
| Labour hold | | Swing | ▲4.0 | |

=== Larkhall West ===
Larkhall West
| Party | Candidate | Votes | % |
|---|---|---|---|
| Labour | Tom McCabe | 995 | 67.0 |
| SNP | M. Miller | 489 | 33.0 |
| Majority | | 506 | 34.0 |
| Turnout | | 1,484 | 41.2 |
| Registered electors | | 3,603 | |
| Labour win (new seat) | | | |

=== Larkhall South ===
Larkhall South
| Party | Candidate | Votes | % | ±% |
|---|---|---|---|---|
| Labour | S. Casserly | 1,117 | 76.2 | ▲8.4 |
| SNP | W. Beattie | 349 | 23.8 | ▼7.8 |
| Majority | | 768 | 52.4 | ▲16.2 |
| Turnout | | 1,466 | 44.2 | ▲8.7 |
| Registered electors | | 3,318 | | |
| Labour hold | | Swing | ▲8.1 | |

=== Stonehouse ===
Stonehouse
| Party | Candidate | Votes | % | ±% |
|---|---|---|---|---|
| Labour | R. Gibb | 1,276 | 61.6 | ▼7.0 |
| SNP | J. Young | 796 | 38.4 | ▲7.7 |
| Majority | | 480 | 23.2 | ▼4.7 |
| Turnout | | 2,072 | 48.5 | ▲9.1 |
| Registered electors | | 4,270 | | |
| Labour hold | | Swing | ▼7.3 | |

=== Rutherglen West ===
Rutherglen West
| Party | Candidate | Votes | % |
|---|---|---|---|
| Labour | S. MacQuarrie | 1,052 | 71.8 |
| SNP | E. Findlay | 281 | 19.2 |
| Liberal Democrats | John McLellan | 132 | 9.0 |
| Majority | | 771 | 52.6 |
| Turnout | | 1,465 | 41.9 |
| Registered electors | | 3,498 | |
| Labour win (new seat) | | | |

=== Stonelaw ===
Stonelaw
| Party | Candidate | Votes | % |
|---|---|---|---|
| Liberal Democrats | Gretel Ross | 967 | 56.5 |
| Labour | C. Greig | 434 | 25.3 |
| SNP | R. Fulton | 206 | 12.0 |
| Conservative | J. McCulloch | 106 | 6.2 |
| Majority | | 533 | 31.2 |
| Turnout | | 1,713 | 47.7 |
| Registered electors | | 3,614 | |
| Liberal Democrats win (new seat) | | | |

=== Bankhead ===
Bankhead
| Party | Candidate | Votes | % |
|---|---|---|---|
| Labour | Eddie McAvoy | 665 | 44.6 |
| Liberal Democrats | John Rodgers | 539 | 36.2 |
| SNP | H. Ross | 208 | 14.0 |
| Conservative | I. Raeburn | 78 | 5.2 |
| Majority | | 126 | 8.4 |
| Turnout | | 1,490 | 48.3 |
| Registered electors | | 3,087 | |
| Labour win (new seat) | | | |

=== Spittal/Blairbeth ===
Spittal/Blairbeth
| Party | Candidate | Votes | % |
|---|---|---|---|
| Labour | William McCaig | 857 | 49.0 |
| Liberal Democrats | Charles Clark | 737 | 42.1 |
| SNP | R. MacMillan | 156 | 8.9 |
| Majority | | 120 | 6.9 |
| Turnout | | 1,750 | 53.0 |
| Registered electors | | 3,303 | |
| Labour win (new seat) | | | |

=== Burgh ===
Burgh
| Party | Candidate | Votes | % |
|---|---|---|---|
| Labour | Margaret Robinson | 1,012 | 58.3 |
| Liberal Democrats | D. Easton | 499 | 28.7 |
| SNP | D. Hamilton | 225 | 13.0 |
| Majority | | 513 | 29.6 |
| Turnout | | 1,736 | 46.2 |
| Registered electors | | 3,758 | |
| Labour win (new seat) | | | |

=== Cairns ===
Cairns
| Party | Candidate | Votes | % |
|---|---|---|---|
| Labour | A. McGowan | 1,115 | 73.1 |
| SNP | Anne Higgins | 235 | 15.4 |
| Liberal Democrats | A. F. Nimmo | 99 | 6.5 |
| Communist | R. Ross | 77 | 5.0 |
| Majority | | 880 | 57.7 |
| Turnout | | 1,526 | 40.9 |
| Registered electors | | 3,730 | |
| Labour win (new seat) | | | |

=== Hallside ===
Hallside
| Party | Candidate | Votes | % |
|---|---|---|---|
| Labour | Davy Keirs | 1,009 | 76.1 |
| SNP | John Higgins | 237 | 17.9 |
| Liberal Democrats | M. Craig | 80 | 6.0 |
| Majority | | 772 | 58.2 |
| Turnout | | 1,326 | 44.4 |
| Registered electors | | 2,989 | |
| Labour win (new seat) | | | |

=== Cambuslang Central ===
Cambuslang Central
| Party | Candidate | Votes | % |
|---|---|---|---|
| Labour | Bob Rooney | 1,027 | 70.1 |
| SNP | Clare McColl | 359 | 24.5 |
| Liberal Democrats | R. Woolfe | 79 | 5.4 |
| Majority | | 668 | 45.6 |
| Turnout | | 1,465 | 48.2 |
| Registered electors | | 3,040 | |
| Labour win (new seat) | | | |

=== Cathkin/Springhall ===
Cathkin/Springhall
| Party | Candidate | Votes | % |
|---|---|---|---|
| Labour | Russell Clearie | 939 | 48.1 |
| Liberal Democrats | M. McLellan | 782 | 40.1 |
| SNP | J. McColl | 231 | 11.8 |
| Majority | | 157 | 8.0 |
| Turnout | | 1,952 | 50.2 |
| Registered electors | | 3,886 | |
| Labour win (new seat) | | | |

=== Burnside ===
Burnside
| Party | Candidate | Votes | % |
|---|---|---|---|
| Liberal Democrats | G. Chapman | 662 | 49.3 |
| Conservative | Jean Miller | 253 | 18.8 |
| Labour | J. Quigg | 236 | 17.6 |
| SNP | Alistair Fulton | 192 | 14.3 |
| Majority | | 409 | 30.5 |
| Turnout | | 1,343 | 51.4 |
| Registered electors | | 2,614 | |
| Liberal Democrats win (new seat) | | | |

=== Fernhill ===
Fernhill
| Party | Candidate | Votes | % |
|---|---|---|---|
| Labour | M. Caldwell | 829 | 55.4 |
| Liberal Democrats | J. Maguire | 352 | 23.5 |
| SNP | D. Whyteside | 316 | 21.1 |
| Majority | | 477 | 31.9 |
| Turnout | | 1,497 | 53.2 |
| Registered electors | | 2,813 | |
| Labour win (new seat) | | | |

=== Kirkhill/Whitlawburn ===
Kirkhill/Whitlawburn
| Party | Candidate | Votes | % |
|---|---|---|---|
| Labour | Patrick McKenna | 745 | 41.9 |
| Liberal Democrats | David Baillie | 668 | 37.6 |
| SNP | A. J. Davidson | 257 | 14.5 |
| Conservative | R. Miller | 108 | 6.1 |
| Majority | | 77 | 4.3 |
| Turnout | | 1,778 | 43.8 |
| Registered electors | | 4,064 | |
| Labour win (new seat) | | | |

=== Eastfield ===
Eastfield
| Party | Candidate | Votes | % |
|---|---|---|---|
| Labour | John McGuinness | 975 | 67.0 |
| SNP | Gordon Clark | 308 | 21.2 |
| Liberal Democrats | M. R. Kibby | 173 | 11.9 |
| Majority | | 667 | 45.8 |
| Turnout | | 1,456 | 48.6 |
| Registered electors | | 2,996 | |
| Labour win (new seat) | | | |

== Aftermath ==
=== Forth by-election ===
Forth by-election, 8 June 1995
| Party | Candidate | Votes | % |
|---|---|---|---|
| Labour | Ian Roberts | 781 | 65.5 |
| SNP | Margaret Waye | 411 | 34.5 |
| Majority | | 370 | 31.0 |
| Turnout | | 1,192 | |
| Registered electors | | | |
| Labour win (new seat) | | | |

== Notes ==
1. Note 1- In 1992, Labour won 10 seats in Hamilton, 12 seats in East Kilbride, 7 seats in Clydesdale and 3 of the seats in City of Glasgow wards which became South Lanarkshire.
2. Note 2- In 1992, the SNP won 2 seats in East Kilbride and 4 seats in Clydesdale.
3. Note 3- In 1992, the Liberal Democrats won 2 seats in Hamilton and 1 of the seats in City of Glasgow wards which became South Lanarkshire.
4. Note 4- In 1992, the Conservatives won 2 seats in Hamilton, 2 seats in East Kilbride and 3 seats in Clydesdale.
