= 1988 Hamilton District Council election =

Hamilton District Council election

- 5 May 1988

All 20 seats to Hamilton District Council 11 seats needed for a majority
- Registered: 80,029
- Turnout: 48.8%
	First party	Second party	Third party
	Lab	SSLD	SNP
Party	Labour	SSLD	SNP
Last election	17 seats, 64.9%	2 seats, 16.4% (Note: At the 1984 election, the SDP–Liberal Alliance won 16.4% of the vote with candidates from both the Social Democratic Party (SDP) and the Liberal Party. These parties subsequently merged in March 1988 to form the Scottish Social and Liberal Democrats (SSLD).)	0 seats, 8.0%
Seats won	15	2	1
Seat change	▼2	Steady	▲1
Popular vote	21,235	3,031	7,700
Percentage	54.7%	7.8%	19.9%
Swing	▼10.2	▼8.6	▲11.9
	Fourth party	Fifth party
	Con	ILab
Party	Conservative	Independent Labour
Last election	1 seats, 10.7%	N/A
Seats won	1	1
Seat change	Steady	▲1
Popular vote	3,861	2,592
Percentage	10.0%	6.6%
Swing	▼0.7	New
Council Leader before election
Labour
Council Leader after election
Labour

Elections to Hamilton District Council were held on 5 May 1988, on the same day as the other Scottish local government elections. This was the fifth election to the district council following the local government reforms in the 1970s.

The election used the 20 wards created by the Initial Statutory Reviews of Electoral Arrangements in 1980. Each ward elected one councillor using first-past-the-post voting.

Despite losing two seats and their vote share falling by 10.2%, Labour maintained control of the district council as they won 15 of the 20 seats – taking 54.7% of the popular vote. In March 1988, the Social Democratic Party and the Liberal Party merged and the newly formed Scottish Social and Liberal Democrats (SSLD) matched the result of the SDP–Liberal Alliance at the previous election as they returned two councillors. The remaining seats were won by the Scottish National Party (SNP) – who gained one seat and had come second in the popular vote – and the Conservatives.

== Results ==
1988 Hamilton District Council election result
Party	Seats	Gains	Losses	Net gain/loss	Seats %	Votes %	Votes	+/−
Labour	15	1	3	▼2	75.0	54.7	21,235	▼10.2
SSLD	2	1	1	Steady	10.0	7.8	3,031	▼8.6
SNP	1	1	0	▲1	10.0	19.9	7,700	▲11.9
Conservative	1	0	0	Steady	10.0	10.0	3,861	▼0.7
Independent Labour	1	1	0	▲1	10.0	6.6	2,592	New
Tenants' Association	0	0	0	Steady	0.0	1.1	448	New
Total	20						38,867	

== Ward results ==
=== Hillhouse ===
Hillhouse
Party	Candidate	Votes	%	±%
Labour	R. Newberry	1,200	78.5	▼4.2
SNP	J. Randalls	276	18.1	▲11.8
Conservative	H. MacKie	50	3.3	▲0.3
Majority		924	60.4	▼14.4
Turnout		1,526	43.4	▲1.5
Registered electors		3,525		
Labour hold		Swing	▼4.2	

=== Udston ===
Udston
Party	Candidate	Votes	%	±%
Labour	R. Scott	1,499	74.2	▼3.2
SNP	J. Pollock	512	25.4	▲12.5
Majority		987	48.8	▼15.7
Turnout		2,011	49.4	▲3.7
Registered electors		4,084		
Labour hold		Swing	▼3.2	

=== Wellhall North ===
Wellhall North
Party	Candidate	Votes	%	±%
SSLD	I. Blackstock	720	36.3	▲28.4
Labour	S. Dallas	418	21.1	▼22.0
Independent Labour	B. McKinnon	372	18.7	New
SNP	W. Stevenson	277	14.0	▲7.3
Conservative	D. Thomas	195	9.8	▼3.0
Majority		302	15.2	N/A
Turnout		1,982	44.5	▲3.5
Registered electors		4,464		
SSLD gain from Labour		Swing	▲25.2	

=== Central ===
Central
Party	Candidate	Votes	%	±%
Labour	T. Murphy	981	51.7	▲0.6
Conservative	W. Irving	527	27.8	▼1.5
SSLD	J. Clarke	378	19.9	▲7.0
Majority		454	23.9	▲2.1
Turnout		1,886	43.6	▼3.8
Registered electors		4,353		
Labour hold		Swing	▲0.6	

=== Burnbank ===
Burnbank
Party	Candidate	Votes	%	±%
Labour	I. McKillop	1,140	57.7	▼29.2
Tenants' Association	E. Kerr	448	22.7	New
SNP	G. Gebbie	302	15.3	New
Conservative	R. Wilkie	83	4.2	▼8.3
Majority		692	35.0	▼39.4
Turnout		1,973	47.3	▲7.8
Registered electors		4,176		
Labour hold		Swing	▼29.2	

=== Ferniegair ===
Ferniegair
Party	Candidate	Votes	%	±%
Conservative	M. Mitchell	759	41.1	▼1.4
Labour	I. Donnelly	632	34.2	▼0.4
SNP	E. Hamilton	449	24.3	▲17.9
Majority		127	6.9	▼1.0
Turnout		1,840	47.4	▼0.5
Registered electors		3,896		
Conservative hold		Swing	▼0.5	

=== Fairhill ===
Fairhill
Party	Candidate	Votes	%	±%
Labour	N. Cochrane	1,176	62.8	▼21.1
SNP	Y. Dear	595	31.8	New
Conservative	M. Murray	98	5.2	▼10.4
Majority		581	31.0	▼37.3
Turnout		1,863	48.5	▲4.2
Registered electors		3,863		
Labour hold		Swing	▼21.1	

=== Woodhead ===
Woodhead
Party	Candidate	Votes	%	±%
Labour	J. Lowe	1,457	73.3	▼10.1
SNP	S. Buchanan	523	26.3	▲16.3
Majority		934	47.0	▼26.4
Turnout		1,526	45.0	▲0.2
Registered electors		4,424		
Labour hold		Swing	▼10.1	

=== Low Waters ===
Low Waters
Party	Candidate	Votes	%	±%
Labour	P. Grenfell	836	41.6	▲3.5
Conservative	A. Kegg	592	29.5	▼1.8
SNP	N. Dear	576	28.7	▲20.2
Majority		244	12.1	▲5.3
Turnout		2,004	49.6	▼0.1
Registered electors		4,051		
Labour hold		Swing	▲2.6	

=== Cadzow ===
Cadzow
Party	Candidate	Votes	%	±%
SNP	J. Smith	915	47.8	▲30.9
Labour	G. Smith	878	45.8	▼36.8
Conservative	A. Aitchison	122	6.4	New
Majority		37	2.0	N/A
Turnout		1,915	51.4	▲4.8
Registered electors		3,728		
SNP gain from Labour		Swing	▲33.8	

=== Dalserf ===
Dalserf
Party	Candidate	Votes	%	±%
Labour	M. Ahmed	913	52.1	▼16.2
Independent Labour	J. Millward	365	20.8	New
SNP	R. Wilson	252	14.4	▼1.7
Conservative	A. Aitchison	221	12.6	New
Majority		548	31.3	▼20.9
Turnout		1,751	52.7	▲16.4
Registered electors		3,321		
Labour hold		Swing	▼16.2	

=== Larkhall East ===
Larkhall East
Party	Candidate	Votes	%	±%
Labour	R. Ferguson	973	58.3	▼9.2
SNP	M. Miller	686	41.1	▲9.2
Majority		287	17.2	▼18.3
Turnout		1,659	46.6	▲5.9
Registered electors		3,582		
Labour hold		Swing	▼9.2	

=== Larkhall North ===
Larkhall North
Party	Candidate	Votes	%	±%
Labour	T. McCabe	1,163	66.2	▼11.5
SNP	R. Forbes	576	32.8	▲11.4
Majority		587	33.4	▼22.9
Turnout		1,739	46.2	▲8.0
Registered electors		3,800		
Labour hold		Swing	▼11.4	

=== Larkhall South ===
Larkhall South
Party	Candidate	Votes	%	±%
Labour	S. Casserly	1,204	72.6	▼9.5
SNP	M. Miller	453	27.3	▲9.7
Majority		751	45.3	▼19.2
Turnout		1,657	50.7	▲4.7
Registered electors		3,275		
Labour hold		Swing	▼9.6	

=== Stonehouse ===
Stonehouse
Party	Candidate	Votes	%	±%
Labour	R. Gibb	1,305	66.0	▲5.8
Conservative	A. Haston	407	20.6	New
SNP	R. Clark	265	13.4	▲7.5
Majority		898	45.4	▲19.0
Turnout		1,977	50.0	▼5.3
Registered electors		3,953		
Labour hold		Swing	▲5.8	

=== Uddingston ===
Uddingston
Party	Candidate	Votes	%	±%
SSLD	T. Maxwell	1,060	49.5	▼7.1
Labour	C. Begley	801	37.4	▲8.9
Conservative	G. Prince	277	12.9	▼1.7
Majority		259	12.1	▼16.0
Turnout		2,138	53.9	▲1.7
Registered electors		3,974		
SSLD hold		Swing	▼7.1	

=== Bothwell ===
Bothwell
Party	Candidate	Votes	%	±%
Labour	M. Rooney	1,060	41.2	▲3.8
SSLD	M. Radcliffe	873	34.0	▼20.1
Conservative	E. Bath	393	15.3	▲7.0
SNP	C. Sutherland	242	9.4	New
Majority		187	7.2	N/A
Turnout		2,568	55.1	▲0.8
Registered electors		4,664		
Labour gain from Liberal		Swing	▲11.9	

=== High Blantyre ===
High Blantyre
Party	Candidate	Votes	%	±%
Labour	J. Swinburne	1,199	58.0	▼34.0
Independent Labour	M. Martin	524	25.4	New
SNP	I. Campbell	339	16.4	New
Majority		675	32.6	▼51.7
Turnout		2,062	53.5	▲11.1
Registered electors		3,867		
Labour hold		Swing	▼34.0	

=== Blantyre ===
Blantyre
Party	Candidate	Votes	%	±%
Independent Labour	M. Tremble	1,331	57.4	New
Labour	J. Handibode	837	36.1	▼42.1
Conservative	L. McIntosh	137	5.9	▼2.7
Majority		494	21.3	N/A
Turnout		2,305	50.6	▲7.4
Registered electors		4,575		
Independent Labour gain from Labour		Swing	▲49.7	

=== Stonefield ===
Stonefield
Party	Candidate	Votes	%
Labour	H. Dunsmuir	1,563	77.0
SNP	T. Muir	462	22.7
Majority		1,101	54.3
Turnout		2,025	45.6
Registered electors		4,454	
Labour hold			
