= 1974 Hamilton District Council election =

Hamilton District Council election

7 May 1974	1977 →

All 20 seats to Hamilton District Council 11 seats needed for a majority
- Registered: 74,381
- Turnout: %
	First party	Second party
	Lab	SNP
Party	Labour	SNP
Seats won	13	2
Popular vote	17,530	10,248
Percentage	45.7%	26.7%
	Third party	Fourth party
	Con	Lib
Party	Conservative	Liberal
Seats won	2	2
Popular vote	4,765	2,784
Percentage	12.4%	7.3%
Council Leader after election
Labour

Elections to Hamilton District Council were held on 7 May 1974, on the same day as the other Scottish local government elections. This was the first election to the district council following the implementation of the Local Government (Scotland) Act 1973.

The election used the 20 wards created by the Formation Electoral Arrangements in 1974. Each ward elected one councillor using first-past-the-post voting.

Labour took control of the council after winning a majority of the seats – 13 – and taking nearly half the popular vote. The Scottish National Party (SNP) took more than a quarter of the popular vote but only returned two seats. Both the Conservatives and the Liberals also returned two seats with less than half the vote share of the SNP. The remaining seat was won by an independent candidate.

== Background ==
Prior to 1974, Hamilton was one of nine burghs within the County of Lanark. As a large burgh, powers over planning, local taxation, building control, housing, lighting and drainage as well as further powers over the police, public health, social services, registration of births, marriages and deaths and electoral registration rested with the burgh council. The rest of the local government responsibility fell to the county council which had full control over the areas which were not within a burgh.

Following the recommendations in the Wheatly Report, the old system of counties and burghs – which had resulted in a mishmash of local government areas in which some small burghs had larger populations but far fewer responsibilities than some large burghs and even counties – was to be replaced by a new system of regional and district councils. Hamilton Burgh and the surrounding areas including Blantyre, Bothwell, Uddingston, Larkhall and Stonehouse was to be placed in Hamilton District within the Strathclyde region.

== Results ==
1974 Hamilton District Council election result
Party	Seats	Gains	Losses	Net gain/loss	Seats %	Votes %	Votes	+/−
Labour	13			N/A	65.0	45.7	17,530	N/A
SNP	2			N/A	10.0	26.7	10,248	N/A
Conservative	2			N/A	10.0	12.5	4,765	N/A
Liberal	2			N/A	10.0	7.3	2,784	N/A
Independent	1			N/A	5.0	2.1	812	N/A
Independent Labour	0			N/A	0.0	5.6	2,138	N/A
Communist	0			N/A	0.0	0.3	98	N/A
Total	20							

== Ward results ==
=== Hillhouse ===
Hillhouse
Party	Candidate	Votes	%
Labour	R. Newberry	888	60.2
SNP	J. Boothroyd	588	39.8
Majority		300	20.4
Turnout		1,476	49.0
Registered electors		3,041	
Labour win (new seat)			

=== Udston ===
Udston
Party	Candidate	Votes	%
Labour	S. Dallas	Unopposed	
Registered electors		3,181	
Labour win (new seat)			

=== Wellhall North ===
Wellhall North
Party	Candidate	Votes	%
SNP	M. Kirkwood	676	47.3
Labour	H. Doyle	377	26.4
Conservative	A. Aitchison	377	26.4
Majority		299	20.9
Turnout		1,430	46.3
Registered electors		3,104	
SNP win (new seat)			

=== Central ===
Central
Party	Candidate	Votes	%
Conservative	C. Brain	721	52.3
Labour	T. Murphy	658	47.7
Majority		63	4.6
Turnout		1,379	54.7
Registered electors		2,543	
Conservative win (new seat)			

=== Burnbank ===
Burnbank
Party	Candidate	Votes	%
Labour	C. Brownlie	1,267	61.2
SNP	D. Brown	804	38.8
Majority		463	22.4
Turnout		2,071	50.3
Registered electors		4,164	
Labour win (new seat)			

=== Bent ===
Bent
Party	Candidate	Votes	%
SNP	J. Ross	728	40.3
Labour	M. S. Ewart	623	34.5
Conservative	G. Cowper	455	25.2
Majority		105	5.8
Turnout		1,806	57.0
Registered electors		3,184	
SNP win (new seat)			

=== Fairhill ===
Fairhill
Party	Candidate	Votes	%
Labour	N. Cochrane	1,273	51.3
SNP	E. Moore	1,113	44.8
Communist	A. Valentine	98	4.0
Majority		160	6.5
Turnout		2,484	50.7
Registered electors		4,942	
Labour win (new seat)			

=== Wellhall South ===
Wellhall South
Party	Candidate	Votes	%
Labour	R. Sherry	627	53.0
Conservative	G. Young	282	23.8
Liberal	J. Millward	275	23.2
Majority		345	29.2
Turnout		1,184	52.8
Registered electors		2,273	
Labour win (new seat)			

=== Low Waters ===
Low Waters
Party	Candidate	Votes	%
Conservative	D. Williamson	1,661	66.9
Labour	I. McKillop	822	33.1
Majority		839	33.8
Turnout		2,483	56.0
Registered electors		4,506	
Conservative win (new seat)			

=== Cadzow ===
Cadzow
Party	Candidate	Votes	%
Labour	W. Condie	1,687	63.8
Conservative	G. Skelton-Smith	957	36.2
Majority		730	27.6
Turnout		2,644	48.3
Registered electors		5,619	
Labour win (new seat)			

=== Dalserf ===
Dalserf
Party	Candidate	Votes	%
Labour	M. Grove	857	44.9
SNP	G. Smith	683	35.8
Independent Labour	J. McLean	367	19.2
Majority		174	9.1
Turnout		1,907	51.3
Registered electors		3,715	
Labour win (new seat)			

=== Machan ===
Machan
Party	Candidate	Votes	%
Labour	J. Hunter	985	42.8
SNP	M. Fergusson	965	41.9
Independent Labour	J. Kelly	351	15.3
Majority		20	0.9
Turnout		2,301	53.9
Registered electors		4,282	
Labour win (new seat)			

=== Avonholm ===
Avonholm
Party	Candidate	Votes	%
Labour	J. Speirs	662	39.4
Independent Labour	W. Little	623	37.1
SNP	M. Miller	394	23.5
Majority		39	1.7
Turnout		1,679	57.1
Registered electors		2,957	
Labour win (new seat)			

=== Strutherhill ===
Strutherhill
Party	Candidate	Votes	%
Labour	S. Casserly	726	44.0
Independent Labour	J. Downie	662	40.1
SNP	E. Rocks	263	15.9
Majority		64	3.9
Turnout		1,651	62.0
Registered electors		2,674	
Labour win (new seat)			

=== Stonehouse ===
Stonehouse
Party	Candidate	Votes	%
Independent	M. Burns	812	40.0
Labour	H. Chalmers	711	35.1
SNP	C. McFarlane	505	24.9
Majority		101	4.9
Turnout		2,028	60.2
Registered electors		3,391	
Independent win (new seat)			

=== Bothwell and Uddingston North ===
Bothwell and Uddingston North
Party	Candidate	Votes	%
Liberal	T. Maxwell	939	44.0
Labour	S. Sloss	809	37.9
SNP	D. Kirkcaldy	388	18.2
Majority		130	6.1
Turnout		2,136	62.0
Registered electors		3,486	
Liberal win (new seat)			

=== Bothwell and Uddingston South ===
Bothwell and Uddingston South
Party	Candidate	Votes	%
Liberal	T. Grieve	1,568	68.1
Conservative	G. McAllister	312	13.5
Labour	G. Forry	279	12.1
SNP	H. Graham	145	6.3
Majority		1,256	54.6
Turnout		2,304	66.6
Registered electors		3,485	
Liberal win (new seat)			

=== High Blantyre ===
High Blantyre
Party	Candidate	Votes	%
Labour	J. Swinburne	1,353	55.7
SNP	D. Crawford	1,075	44.3
Majority		278	11.4
Turnout		2,428	51.0
Registered electors		4,789	
Labour win (new seat)			

=== Blantyre ===
Blantyre
Party	Candidate	Votes	%
Labour	D. Tremble	1,412	56.3
SNP	T. Rarity	1,094	43.7
Majority		318	12.6
Turnout		2,506	54.9
Registered electors		4,648	
Labour win (new seat)			

=== Stonefield ===
Stonefield
Party	Candidate	Votes	%
Labour	G. McInally	1,514	61.2
SNP	J. Waugh	827	33.4
Independent Labour	A. McLauchlan	135	5.5
Majority		687	27.8
Turnout		2,476	57.7
Registered electors		4,397	
Labour win (new seat)			
