= 1895 Edinburgh Corporation election =

Local election in Scotland

An Election to the Edinburgh Corporation was held on 5 November 1895, alongside municipal elections across Scotland, and the wider British local elections. Contests took place in 2 of the cities 13 wards, with candidates in the remaining 11 being returned unopposed. The election was relatively quiet, with no particularly important issues being raised.

== Aggregate results ==
Edinburgh Corporation election, 1895 (Contested seats)
Party	Seats	Gains	Losses	Net gain/loss	Seats %	Votes %	Votes	+/−
Liberal	1					33.21	1,110	
Unionist	1					26.69	892	
Irish Nationalist	0					25.73	860	
Ind. Labour Party	0					14.36	480	

== Ward results ==
St. Leonard's Spoiled votes: 11
Party	Candidate	Votes	%	±%
Liberal	Councillor John Jamieson	1,110		
Ind. Labour Party	William Gall	480		
Majority		630		
Turnout		1,590		
Liberal hold		Swing		

St. Giles 1 seat Spoiled votes: 7
Party	Candidate	Votes	%	±%
Unionist	Robert Menzies	892		
Irish Nationalist	P. Cavanagh	860		
Majority		32		
Turnout		1,752		
Unionist hold		Swing		
