= Fred McDermid =

Frederick McDermid (9 February 1924 – 23 August 2011) was a Scottish Liberal Party politician.

Born in Partick, McDermid studied at Hyndland School before completing an apprenticeship as a quantity surveyor. During World War II, he volunteered as an air raid warden, then spent the last two years in the British Army, based in the UK.

In the late 1940s, McDermid had two bouts of tuberculosis, and in 1950 he moved to Stonehouse, hoping that the cleaner air there would improve his health. He worked locally as a quantity surveyor, and became active in the Congregational Union of Scotland, serving on its building committee. He also served as president of the Congregational Union for several years in the 1960s. He also became a lay preacher, and from 1986 served as pastor for the Lanark Evangelical Union Church.

In 1967, McDermid was elected to Hamilton District Council as an independent, but in 1970 he decided to join the Liberal Party. He stood unsuccessfully for the party in Lanark at the October 1974 and 1979 general elections, and also in the high-profile 1978 Hamilton by-election, at which he took only 2.6% of the vote. In 1980, he was elected as chair of the Scottish Liberal Party, then in 1982 he moved to become its president.

In his later years, McDermid devoted his time to religion and community activities. He was also known as an expert on Robert Burns and for the votes of thanks he was invited to give at many events.

Party political offices
Preceded by Terry Grieve	Chair of the Scottish Liberal Party; 1980–1982	Succeeded by Ross Finnie
Preceded by Robert L. Smith	President of the Scottish Liberal Party; 1982–1983	Succeeded by George Mackie
