= Hamilton West and Earnock (ward) =

Electoral ward in South Lanarkshire, Scotland

- South Lanarkshire
- Boundary of Hamilton West and Earnock in South Lanarkshire from 2007–2017.
- Population: 18,503 (2020)
- Electorate: 15,083 (2022)
- Major settlements: Hamilton (part of)
- Scottish Parliament constituency: Hamilton, Larkhall and Stonehouse
- Scottish Parliament region: Central Scotland
- UK Parliament constituency: Hamilton and Clyde Valley

Current ward
- Created: 2007
- Number of councillors: 4
- Councillor: Mary Donnelly (SNP)
- Councillor: Alan Falconer (Labour)
- Councillor: Graeme Horne (SNP)
- Councillor: Mark McGeever (Liberal Democrats)
- Created from: Cadzow; Earnock; Hamilton Centre North; High Blantyre; Hillhouse; Udston; Wellhall/Earnock; Woodhead/Meikle Earnock

Hamilton West and Earnock is one of the 20 electoral wards of South Lanarkshire Council. Created in 2007, the ward elects four councillors using the single transferable vote electoral system and covers an area with a population of 18,503 people.

The ward was previously a Labour stronghold with the party holding half of the seats between 2007 and 2017. However, it has since become a Scottish National Party (SNP) stronghold with the party holding half of the seats since a by-election win in 2011.

== Boundaries ==
The ward was created following the Fourth Statutory Reviews of Electoral Arrangements ahead of the 2007 Scottish local elections. As a result of the Local Governance (Scotland) Act 2004, local elections in Scotland would use the single transferable vote electoral system from 2007 onwards so Hamilton West and Earnock was formed from an amalgamation of several previous first-past-the-post wards. It contained the majority of the former High Blantyre, Udston and Wellhall/Earnock wards, a small part of the former Hamilton Centre North ward and part of the former Cadzow and Woodhead/Meikle Earnock wards as well as all of the former Earnock and Hillhouse wards. Hamilton West and Earnock covers the western part of Hamilton including the Brackenhill, Earnock, High Earnock, Highstonehall, Hillhouse, Little Earnock and Udston neighbourhoods, as well as the adjoining West Craigs development. Following the Fifth Statutory Reviews of Electoral Arrangements ahead of the 2017 Scottish local elections, the ward's boundaries were unchanged.

== Councillors ==
Year	Councillors			
2007	Allan Falconer (Labour)	Jean McKeown (Labour)	Graeme Horne (SNP)	Tommy Gilligan (Ind.)
2011 by-election	Allan Falconer (Labour)	Jean McKeown (Labour)	Graeme Horne (SNP)	Jon Menzies (SNP)
2012	Allan Falconer (Labour)	Jean McKeown (Labour)	Graeme Horne (SNP)	Jon Menzies (SNP)
2017	Allan Falconer (Labour)	Mark McGeever (Conservative/ Liberal Democrats)	Graeme Horne (SNP)	Mary Donnelly (SNP)
2019	Allan Falconer (Labour)	Mark McGeever (Conservative/ Liberal Democrats)	Graeme Horne (SNP)	Mary Donnelly (SNP)
2022	Allan Falconer (Labour)	Mark McGeever (Conservative/ Liberal Democrats)	Graeme Horne (SNP)	Mary Donnelly (SNP)

== Election results ==
=== 2022 election ===
Hamilton West and Earnock - 4 seats
Party	Candidate	FPv%	Count						
Party	Candidate	FPv%	1	2	3	4	5	6	7
SNP	Mary Donnelly (incumbent)	29.7	1,731						
Labour	Allan Falconer (incumbent)	24.1	1,404						
Conservative	Graham William Fisher	12.9	753	761	779	783	785	862	
Liberal Democrats	Mark McGeever (incumbent)	11.9	691	706	715	759	778	989	1,440
SNP	Graeme Horne (incumbent)	11.7	680	1,140	1,150	1,263			
Labour	Jim Lee	6.6	385	391	561	583	606		
Green	Leonard Gingell	3.1	179	221	227				
Electorate: 15,083 Valid: 5,823 Spoilt: 135 Quota: 1,165 Turnout: 39.5%

=== 2017 election ===
Hamilton West and Earnock - 4 seats
Party	Candidate	FPv%	Count					
Party	Candidate	FPv%	1	2	3	4	5	6
SNP	Mary Donnelly	25.7	1,377					
Conservative	Mark McGeever (Note: On 26 July 2019, Hamilton West and Earnock Conservative councillor Mark McGeever resigned from the party and joined the Liberal Democrats following the election of Boris Johnson as Conservative Party Leader and Prime Minister.)	22.7	1,215					
Labour	Allan Falconer (incumbent)	20.4	1,092					
SNP	Graeme Horne (incumbent)	14.1	752	1,019	1,025	1,026	1,069	1,111
Labour	Jean McKeown (incumbent)	12.5	671	681	720	737	757	830
Liberal Democrats	Mark Ruston	2.5	134	138	176	176	208	
Green	Christine Wright	2.1	111	119	126	127		
Electorate: 14,110 Valid: 5,352 Spoilt: 151 Quota: 1,071 Turnout: 39.0%

=== 2012 election ===
Hamilton West and Earnock - 4 seats
Party	Candidate	FPv%	Count		
Party	Candidate	FPv%	1	2	3
Labour	Allan Falconer (incumbent)	27.3	1,170		
SNP	Graeme Horne (incumbent)	26.9	1,153		
Labour	Jean McKeown (incumbent)	20.1	861		
SNP	John Menzies (incumbent)	13.8	592	640	888
Conservative	Connar McBain	8.6	369	387	396
Liberal Democrats	McKenzie Gibson	1.7	74	102	108
UKIP	Rob Sale	1.6	70	95	99
Electorate: 13,853 Valid: 4,289 Spoilt: 77 Quota: 858 Turnout: 31.0%

=== 2011 by-election ===
East Kilbride West by-election (22 October 2011) - 1 seat
Party	Candidate	FPv%	Count
Party	Candidate	FPv%	1
SNP	John Menzies	50.0	822
Labour	Stuart Gallacher	36.9	607
Conservative	Connar McBain	13.0	214
Electorate: 14,068 Valid: 1,643 Spoilt: 16 Quota: 822 Turnout: 11.8%

=== 2007 election ===
Hamilton West and Earnock - 4 seats
Party	Candidate	FPv%	Count						
Party	Candidate	FPv%	1	2	3	4	5	6	7
Labour	Allan Falconer (Note: Returning councillor for Wellhall/Earnock single-member ward.)	26.4	1,670						
SNP	Graeme Horne (Note: Returning councillor for Hillhouse single-member ward.)	25.1	1,591						
Independent	Tommy Gilligan (Note: Returning councillor for Earnock single-member ward.) (Note: Hamilton West and Earnock councillor Tommy Gilligan dies on 22 October 2011. A by-election, held on 8 December 2011, was won by the SNP's John Menzies.)	22.6	1,433						
Labour	Jean McKeown	11.7	743	1,006	1,064	1,088	1,127	???	???
Conservative	John Anderson	9.6	606	622	671	713	732	???	
Green	Scot Graham	2.6	167	180	232	261	320		
Scottish Socialist	Gordon McGovern	2.0	124	138	182	192			
Electorate: 13,749 Valid: 6,334 Quota: 1,267 Turnout: 46.9%
