= George Mackie, Baron Mackie of Benshie =

Scottish politician

The Right Honourable The Lord Mackie of Benshie CBE DSO DFC

Member of the House of Lords
- Lord Temporal
- Life peerage 10 May 1974 – 17 February 2015

Member of Parliament for Caithness and Sutherland
- In office 16 October 1964 – 10 March 1966
- Preceded by: Sir David Robertson
- Succeeded by: Bob Maclennan

Personal details
- Born: George Yull Mackie; 10 July 1919 Tarves, Scotland
- Died: 17 February 2015 (aged 95) Dundee, Scotland
- Party: Liberal (until 1988); Liberal Democrats (1988–2015)
- Spouses: Lindsay Sharp (m. 1944; died 1985) Jacqueline Lane (m. 1988)
- Children: 3
- Occupation: Farmer; RAF navigator Businessman
- Writing career
- Notable works: Flying Farming and Politics - a Liberal Life (2004)
- Military career
- Allegiance: United Kingdom
- Branch: Royal Air Force (RAF)
- Service years: 1939–1945
- Rank: Squadron Leader
- Units: No. 15 Squadron RAF; No. 148 Squadron RAF; No. 115 Squadron RAF; Air Ministry
- Commands: Officers' Squadron
- Conflicts: World War II
- Awards: DFC; DSO

George Yull Mackie, Baron Mackie of Benshie OBE DSO DFC (10 July 1919 – 17 February 2015) was a British Liberal and Liberal Democrat politician.

== Early life ==
Mackie was born in Tarves, Aberdeenshire, the son of Dr Maitland Mackie and his wife Mary (née Yull). He was educated at Aberdeen Grammar School and Aberdeen University. His older brothers were Sir Maitland Mackie and John Mackie, Baron John-Mackie, a future Labour MP.

In 1940 Mackie was commissioned in the Royal Air Force Volunteer Reserve. He served with RAF Bomber Command and was awarded the Distinguished Service Order and Distinguished Flying Cross. After the Second World War, he took over a farm at Benshie, Angus, and subsequently set up a cattle ranch at Braeroy, Inverness-shire, near Spean Bridge.

== Political career ==
Having first contested South Angus as a Liberal in 1959, he was elected Member of Parliament for Caithness and Sutherland in 1964. In the Commons he served as a Liberal party whip. He lost his seat in 1966, when he was defeated by the Labour candidate Robert Maclennan, who was to become a party colleague of Mackie in the late 1980s after he joined the Liberal Democrats via the SDP. Mackie contested Caithness and Sutherland again in 1970, but lost by a wider margin.

Having been appointed a Commander of the Order of the British Empire (CBE) in 1971, he was given a life peerage, as Baron Mackie of Benshie, of Kirriemuir in the County of Angus on 10 May 1974. In the House of Lords, he served as Agriculture and Scottish Affairs spokesman for the Liberals and their successor parties between 1975 and 2000. Having been chair of the Scottish Liberal Party from 1965 to 1970, he was its president between 1983 and 1988. In 1980, he was elected to serve a three-year term as Rector of the University of Dundee.

== Death and legacy ==
Until his death, Mackie was the oldest living person to have served as a Liberal Member of Parliament in the United Kingdom. His death, from a heart attack was announced on 17 February 2015. He died in Ninewells Hospital in Dundee, at 95 years old.

Mackie's papers are held by Archive Services at the University of Dundee.

== Personal life ==
Mackie married firstly, in 1944, Lindsay, daughter of lawyer Alexander Sharp, of Aberdeen. They had three daughters; the eldest of whom, Lindsay, married the journalist Alan Rusbridger and they have two daughters, Lizzie, and the best selling author and journalist Bella Mackie.

Mackie was widowed in 1985, marrying a second time in 1988, to French Air Force Colonel, Marcel Rauch's, daughter, Jacqueline the widow of Andrew Lane.

== Sources ==
- Parliament.uk Biography, parliament.uk; accessed 15 November 2015.
- Leigh Rayment's Peerage Pages
- Leigh Rayment's Historical List of MPs

Parliament of the United Kingdom
| Preceded by Sir David Robertson | Member of Parliament for Caithness and Sutherland; 1964–1966 | Succeeded by Robert Maclennan |
Party political offices
| Preceded by John Bannerman, Baron Bannerman of Kildonan | Chairman of the Scottish Liberal Party; 1965–1970 | Succeeded by Russell Johnston |
| Preceded by Fred McDermid | President of the Scottish Liberal Party; 1983–1988 | Succeeded by Russell Johnston |
Academic offices
| Preceded by Clement Freud | Rector of the University of Dundee; 1980–1983 | Succeeded by Gordon Wilson |
