= Ross Finnie =

Scottish politician (born 1947)

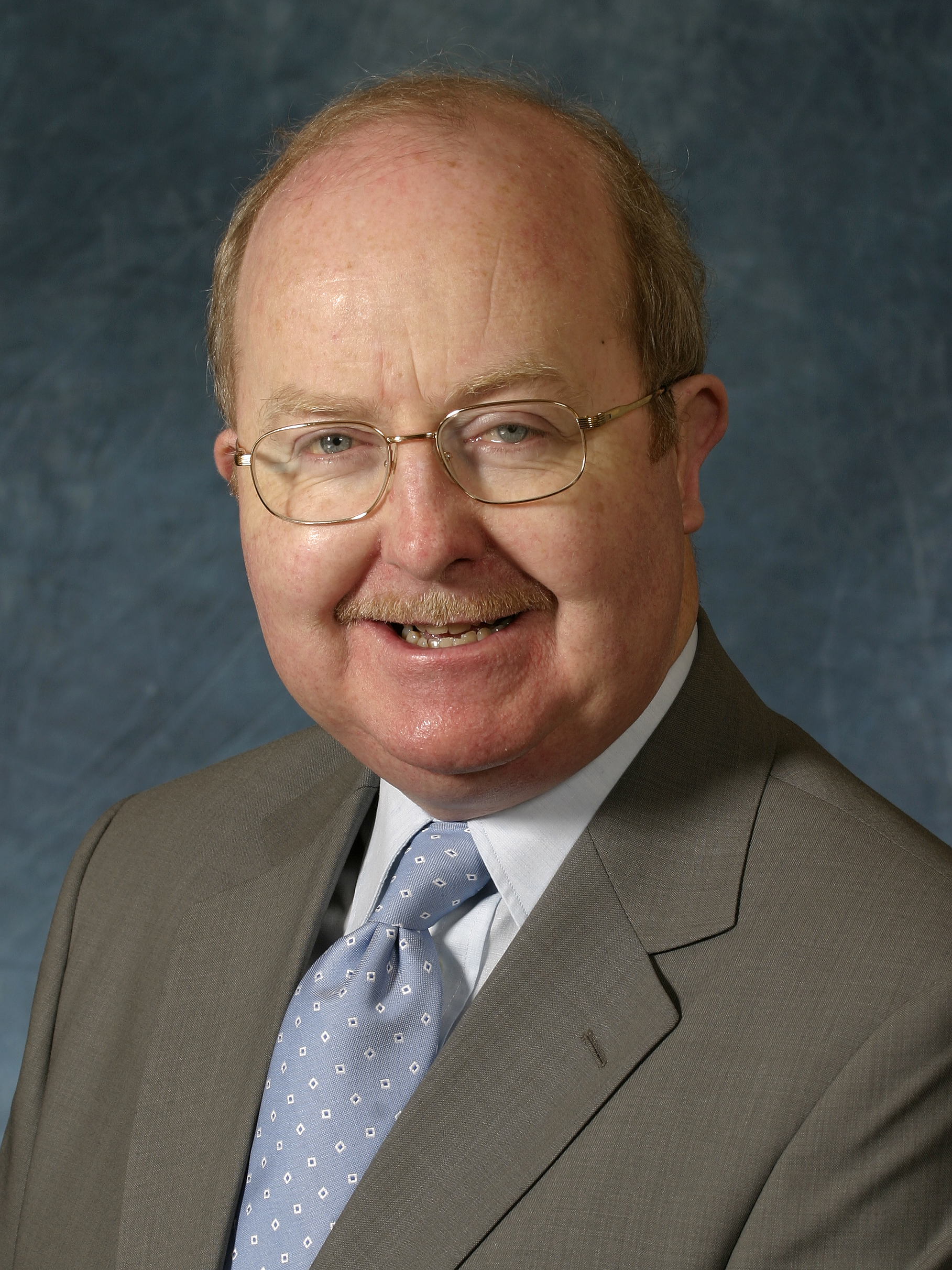
- Official portrait, 2003

Minister for the Environment and Rural Development
- In office 19 May 1999 – 17 May 2007
- First Minister: Donald Dewar; Jim Wallace (acting); Henry McLeish; Jim Wallace (acting); Jack McConnell
- Preceded by: Office established
- Succeeded by: Richard Lochhead

Member of the Scottish Parliament for West of Scotland
- In office 6 May 1999 – 22 March 2011

Personal details
- Born: James Ross Finnie; 11 February 1947 (age 79) Greenock, Scotland
- Party: Scottish Liberal (until 1988); Scottish Liberal Democrats (since 1988)
- Occupation: Accountant

James Ross Finnie (born 11 February 1947) is a Scottish Liberal Democrat politician and a former Member of the Scottish Parliament (MSP). He is a former Minister for the Environment and Rural Development in the Scottish Executive, and Member of the Scottish Parliament for the West of Scotland region. He became an MSP in the first elections to the Scottish Parliament in 1999, and held the same ministerial portfolio until May 2007.

== Background ==
Finnie was educated at Greenock Academy. Previously a self-employed chartered accountant and financial adviser, he was a councillor in Inverclyde from 1977 to 1999. He also previously chaired the Scottish Liberal Party, before chairing the Scottish Liberal Democrats. In the 1979 general election he was the Liberal candidate in Renfrewshire West, and four years later he contested Stirling.

== Member of the Scottish Parliament ==
He stood for election to the Scottish Parliament at the first elections in 1999. He came second in the Greenock and Inverclyde constituency, but was elected as an additional member for the West of Scotland region. He was re-elected to the Scottish Parliament in 2003 and 2007.

Following the 1999 election, the Scottish Liberal Democrats entered into a coalition agreement with the Scottish Labour Party, gaining two seats in the Scottish Cabinet. Finnie was appointed Minister for Rural Development in the first Scottish cabinet by then First Minister, Donald Dewar Finnie retained his position in the Cabinet since 1999 until the Labour-Liberal Democrat government lost power in 2007, making him the longest-serving member of the Scottish cabinet, other than Jack McConnell who was First Minister.

One of the main events in Finnie's time as Minister for Environment and Rural Affairs was the outbreak of foot and mouth in the UK during 2001. Scotland was praised for its response and handling of the crisis.

In January 2004, Finnie took a three-month absence from office to undergo heart bypass surgery and returned in April, after deputy minister Allan Wilson had fulfilled Finnie's ministerial duties.

Finnie was unsuccessful in his bid to be re-elected in the 2011 Scottish Parliament election, losing his seat after 12 years.

== Leadership contest ==
On 7 July 2008, Ross Finnie announced his intention to stand in the election for leader of the Scottish Liberal Democrats, following the resignation of Nicol Stephen MSP. On 26 August 2008, he was defeated by Tavish Scott.

== Controversies ==
In September 2002, Finnie apologised to Digby Jones, the director general of the Confederation of British Industry, after branding him an "English prat" at a dinner following a controversial speech by Mr Jones.

Later that month, Finnie apologised for giving wrong information to the Scottish Parliament during a debate. He had told Parliament that sheep were no longer grazing on the banks of Loch Katrine, which provides Glasgow with its drinking water (a previous outbreak of the cryptosporidium bug in the Loch was believed to have been caused by livestock grazing at the Loch's shores). However, Scottish Water later contacted him to say that the sheep were still there and would not be removed until September 2007. Both the SNP and the Scottish Conservatives made calls for Finnie to be sacked, although the First Minister, Jack McConnell gave him his support.

In June 2006, Finnie cancelled a tender for a new fishery protection vessel for the Scottish Fisheries Protection Agency. The tender has been provisionally awarded to English firm Appledore, but Finnie claimed there was a "fatal flaw" in the tendering process which could have left the Executive liable for damages if the tender had proceeded. However, the Scotland on Sunday reported that a rival bidder, Port Glasgow based Ferguson's was both in Finnie's constituency, and that he was a lifelong friend of the chief executive.

== Water Industry Commission for Scotland ==
In December 2011, it was announced that he would become a non-executive member of the Water Industry Commission for Scotland, taking up the position in July 2012.

== Food Standards Scotland ==
In November 2014, his appointment as the chair of Food Standards Scotland was announced.

Party political offices
Preceded by Fred McDermid	Chair of the Scottish Liberal Party; 1982–1986	Succeeded by Chris Mason
