= Hillhouse (ward) =

Scottish electoral ward

- South Lanarkshire
- Electorate: 2,802 (2003)
- Major settlements: Hamilton (part of)
- Scottish Parliament constituency: Hamilton South
- Scottish Parliament region: Central Scotland
- UK Parliament constituency: Rutherglen and Hamilton West

1974–2007
- Number of councillors: 1
- Replaced by: Hamilton West and Earnock

Hillhouse was one of 67 electoral wards of South Lanarkshire Council. Originally created in 1974, the ward was initially within Hamilton District Council before the local government reforms in the 1990s. The ward elected one councillor using the first-past-the-post voting electoral system.

The ward was a Labour stronghold as the party successfully won the seat at eight of the 10 elections and held the seat for 23 years consecutively after gaining it from the Scottish National Party (SNP) in 1980.

In 2007, the ward was abolished and replaced by the multi-member Hamilton West and Earnock ward as council elections moved to a proportional voting system – the single transferable vote – following the implementation of the Local Governance (Scotland) Act 2004.

== Boundaries ==
The Hillhouse ward was created in 1974 by the Formation Electoral Arrangements from an area in the west of the former Hamilton Burgh. The ward centered around the Hillhouse area in Hamilton. The ward was expanded slightly following the Initial Statutory Reviews of Electoral Arrangements in 1980 before being reduced in size by the Second Statutory Reviews of Electoral Arrangements in 1994 as an area in the north of the ward was transferred to the newly created Burnbank/Springwells ward. After the implementation of the Local Government etc. (Scotland) Act 1994, the boundaries proposed by the second review became the Formation Electoral Arrangements for the newly created South Lanarkshire Council – an amalgamation of Clydesdale District Council, East Kilbride District Council and Hamilton District Council as well as part of the City of Glasgow District Council. In 1998, the Third Statutory Reviews of Electoral Arrangements saw the ward's eastern boundary amended to run along Hillhouse Road and the southern boundary amended to take in streets around the south of Townhill Road. In 2007, the ward was abolished as the Local Governance (Scotland) Act 2004 saw proportional representation and new multi-member wards introduced. The area covered by the Hillhouse ward was placed into the new Hamilton West and Earnock ward.

== Councillors ==
Election	Councillor
1974	R. Newberry
1977	G. McLachlan
1980	R. Newberry
1995	J. McKeown
2003	G. Horne

== Election results ==
=== 2003 election ===
Hillhouse
Party	Candidate	Votes	%	±%
Independent	Graeme Horne	620	48.3	New
Labour	Jean McKeown	610	47.5	▼17.7
Conservative	Janet Brown	54	4.2	▼3.8
Majority		10	0.8	N/A
Turnout		1,284	45.8	▼3.8
Registered electors		2,802		
Independent gain from Labour		Swing	▲33.0	

=== 1999 election ===
Hillhouse
Party	Candidate	Votes	%	±%
Labour	J. McKeown	1,021	65.2	▼1.5
SNP	D. Bryson	421	26.9	▼6.4
Conservative	D. Murray	125	8.0	New
Majority		600	38.3	▲5.0
Turnout		1,567	49.4	▲6.0
Registered electors		3,178		
Labour hold		Swing	▲2.4	

=== 1995 election ===
Hillhouse
Party	Candidate	Votes	%	±%
Labour	J. McKeown	802	66.7	▼1.1
SNP	J. McGuigan	401	33.3	▲1.5
Majority		401	33.3	▼2.7
Turnout		1,203	43.4	▲18.7
Registered electors		2,774		
Labour win (new seat)				

=== 1992 election ===
Hillhouse
Party	Candidate	Votes	%	±%
Labour	R. Newberry	562	67.8	▼10.7
SNP	T. Muir	264	31.8	▲13.7
Majority		298	36.0	▼24.4
Turnout		826	24.7	▼18.7
Registered electors		3,353		
Labour hold		Swing	▼12.2	

=== 1988 election ===
Hillhouse
Party	Candidate	Votes	%	±%
Labour	R. Newberry	1,200	78.5	▼4.2
SNP	J. Randalls	276	18.1	▲11.8
Conservative	H. MacKie	50	3.3	▲0.3
Majority		924	60.4	▼14.4
Turnout		1,526	43.4	▲1.5
Registered electors		3,525		
Labour hold		Swing	▼4.2	

=== 1984 election ===
Hillhouse
Party	Candidate	Votes	%	±%
Labour	R. Newberry	1,284	82.7	▲1.0
Liberal	G. Gloyer	123	7.9	New
SNP	M. Miller	98	6.3	New
Conservative	H. MacKie	47	3.0	▼3.2
Majority		1,161	74.8	▲5.2
Turnout		1,552	41.9	▲4.4
Registered electors		3,708		
Labour hold		Swing	▲1.0	

=== 1980 election ===
Hillhouse
Party	Candidate	Votes	%	±%
Labour	R. Newberry	1,206	81.7	▲34.2
Independent Nationalist	M. Sneddon	178	12.1	New
Conservative	D. Ogg	91	6.2	New
Majority		1,028	69.6	N/A
Turnout		1,475	46.3	▼4.1
Registered electors		3,139		
Labour gain from SNP		Swing	▲34.2	

=== 1977 election ===
Hillhouse
Party	Candidate	Votes	%	±%
SNP	G. McLachlan	855	52.5	▲12.7
Labour	R. Newberry	775	47.5	▼12.7
Majority		80	5.0	N/A
Turnout		1,630	50.4	▲1.4
Registered electors		3,239		
SNP gain from Labour		Swing	▲12.7	

=== 1974 election ===
Hillhouse
Party	Candidate	Votes	%
Labour	R. Newberry	888	60.2
SNP	J. Boothroyd	588	39.8
Majority		300	20.4
Turnout		1,476	49.0
Registered electors		3,041	
Labour win (new seat)			
