= Blantyre (ward) =

Electoral ward of South Lanarkshire Council, Scotland

- South Lanarkshire
- Boundary of Blantyre in South Lanarkshire from 2007–2017.
- Population: 15,968 (2021)
- Electorate: 12,850 (2022)
- Major settlements: Blantyre
- Scottish Parliament constituency: Rutherglen; Uddingston and Bellshill
- Scottish Parliament region: Glasgow
- UK Parliament constituency: Rutherglen

Current ward
- Created: 2007
- Number of councillors: 4 (2007–2017); 3 (2017–present)
- Councillor: Maureen Chalmers (SNP)
- Councillor: Mo Razzaq (Labour)
- Councillor: Bert Thomson (Labour)
- Created from: Blantyre West; Burnbank/Blantyre; Coatshill/Low Blantyre; High Blantyre

1974–1995
- Number of councillors: 1
- Replaced by: Blantyre West; Coatshill/Low Blantyre

Blantyre is one of the 20 electoral wards of South Lanarkshire Council. Re-established in 2007, the ward initially elected four councillors using the single transferable vote electoral system before a boundary review in 2017 reduced the number of councillors to three. It covers an area with a population of 15,968 people.

The ward is a Labour stronghold with the party holding at least two of the seats since the ward's recreation. From 2014 to 2017, the party held all four seats in the ward.

Between 1974 and 1995, Blantyre was one of the 20 first-past-the-post electoral wards of Hamilton District Council.

== Boundaries ==
The Blantyre ward was initially created in 1974 by the Formation Electoral Arrangements from the previous Blantyre electoral division of Lanark County Council. The ward centred around the town of Blantyre and took in the northwestern part of Hamilton District up to its border with the City of Glasgow District. The original single-member ward, covering an area with an electorate of 4,648 people in 1974, was much smaller than the current multi-member ward. The boundaries remained largely unchanged following the Initial Statutory Reviews of Electoral Arrangements in 1980. The ward was abolished in 1995 following the Second Statutory Reviews of Electoral Arrangements in 1994. The second review became the Formation Electoral Arrangements for South Lanarkshire Council – an amalgamation of Hamilton District Council, East Kilbride District Council, Clydesdale District Council and part of the City of Glasgow District Council – following the implementation of the Local Government etc. (Scotland) Act 1994 and the Blantyre ward was replaced by the Blantyre West and Coatshill/Low Blantyre wards.

The ward was re-established following the Fourth Statutory Reviews of Electoral Arrangements ahead of the 2007 Scottish local elections. As a result of the Local Governance (Scotland) Act 2004, local elections in Scotland would use the single transferable vote electoral system from 2007 onwards so Blantyre was formed from an amalgamation of several previous first-past-the-post wards. It contained part of the former Burnbank/Blantyre and High Blantyre wards as well as all of the former Blantyre West and Coatshill/Low Blantyre wards. The Blantyre ward centres on the town of Blantyre, excluding the Hamilton International Technology Park and the modern West Craigs development on the town's southern periphery, in the north of South Lanarkshire between the towns of Cambuslang and Uddingston. The ward is bounded to the north and east by the River Clyde, to the west by the Rotten Calder and to the south by the A725 East Kilbride Expressway. The ward's northern boundary also coincides with the council's border with Glasgow City Council. Following the Fifth Statutory Reviews of Electoral Arrangements ahead of the 2017 Scottish local elections, streets around Ballantrae Road were transferred into Hamilton North and East. The review resulted in a reduction in the number of seats from four to three in order to balance with other wards with similar populations.

== Councillors ==
=== Single-member ward ===
Election	Councillor
1974	D. Tremble
1988	D. Tremble
1992	J. Handibode

=== Multi-member ward ===
Year	Councillors			
2007	Bert Thomson (Ind./ SNP/ Labour)	Jim Handibode (Labour)	John McNamee (SNP/ Labour)	Hugh Dunsmuir (Labour)
2010	Bert Thomson (Ind./ SNP/ Labour)	Jim Handibode (Labour)	John McNamee (SNP/ Labour)	Hugh Dunsmuir (Labour)
2012	Bert Thomson (Ind./ SNP/ Labour)	Jim Handibode (Labour)	John McNamee (SNP/ Labour)	Hugh Dunsmuir (Labour)
2014	Bert Thomson (Ind./ SNP/ Labour)	Jim Handibode (Labour)	John McNamee (SNP/ Labour)	Hugh Dunsmuir (Labour)
2015 by-election	Bert Thomson (Ind./ SNP/ Labour)	Mo Razzaq (Labour)	John McNamee (SNP/ Labour)	Hugh Dunsmuir (Labour)
2017	Bert Thomson (Ind./ SNP/ Labour)	Mo Razzaq (Labour)	Maureen Chalmers (SNP)	
2022	Bert Thomson (Ind./ SNP/ Labour)	Mo Razzaq (Labour)	Maureen Chalmers (SNP)	

== Election results ==
=== 2022 election ===
Blantyre - 3 seats
Party	Candidate	FPv%	Count					
Party	Candidate	FPv%	1	2	3	4	5	6
SNP	Maureen Chalmers (incumbent)	31.7	1,652					
Labour	Mo Razzaq (incumbent)	29.2	1,519					
Labour	Bert Thomson (incumbent)	15.7	815	826	997	1,031	1,066	1,307
SNP	Gerry Chambers	10.4	542	855	864	872	972	982
Conservative	Calum Nimmo	7.7	399	399	408	427	439	
Scottish Green	David McClemont	3.2	169	179	183	205		
Liberal Democrats	Stephen Reid	2.1	110	111	117			
Electorate: 12,850 Valid: 5,206 Spoilt: 165 Quota: 1,302 Turnout: 41.8%

=== 2017 election ===
Blantyre - 3 seats
Party	Candidate	FPv%	Count							
Party	Candidate	FPv%	1	2	3	4	5	6	7	8
Labour	Mo Razzaq (incumbent)	31.0	1,663							
SNP	Maureen Chalmers	25.3	1,354							
SNP	Michael McGlynn	14.8	797	815	827	838	860	879	902	
Labour	Bert Thomson (incumbent)	13.6	731	980	980	988	1,013	1,051	1,278	1,533
Conservative	Alan Fraser	11.1	593	601	601	603	607	635		
Liberal Democrats	Stephen Reid	1.9	100	109	109	112	125			
Solidarity	Ashley Hubbard	1.4	76	80	81	101				
Scottish Socialist	Gerry McMahon	0.9	48	51	52					
Electorate: 12,711 Valid: 5,362 Spoilt: 180 Quota: 1,341 Turnout: 43.6%

=== 2015 by-election ===
Blantyre by-election (10 December 2015) - 1 seat
Party	Candidate	FPv%	Count				
Party	Candidate	FPv%	1	2	3	4	5
Labour	Mo Razzaq	47.2	1,476	1,483	1,504	1,536	1,589
SNP	Gerry Chambers	39.6	1,236	1,246	1,259	1,314	1,327
Conservative	Taylor Muir	4.5	140	156	172	173	
Scottish Socialist	Sean Baillie	3.9	122	125	133		
Liberal Democrats	Stephen Reid	2.9	92	97			
UKIP	Emma Jay Docherty	1.9	59				
Electorate: 13,745 Valid: 3,125 Spoilt: 45 Quota: 1,563 Turnout: 23.1%

=== 2012 election ===
Blantyre - 4 seats
Party	Candidate	FPv%	Count									
Party	Candidate	FPv%	1	2	3	4	5	6	7	8	9	10
Labour	Hugh Dunsmuir (incumbent)	25.0	1,144									
SNP	Bert Thomson (incumbent) (Note: Blantyre SNP councillor Bert Thomson defected from the SNP and joined Labour in 2014.)	20.3	929									
Labour	Jim Handibode (incumbent) (Note: Blantyre Labour councillor Jim Handibode died on 19 September 2015. A by-election was held to fill the vacancy on 10 December 2015 and was won by Labour's Mo Razzaq.)	16.6	756	936								
Labour	John McNamee (incumbent)	12.7	579	601	617	617	621	626	639	687	752	844
SNP	John Mullen	10.3	470	472	473	484	486	490	512	542	581	
Independent	Michael Martin	5.1	234	238	239	239	241	260	297	348		
CPA	Michael McGlynn	4.6	209	212	213	214	214	217	253			
Conservative	Isobel Black	3.9	176	179	179	180	188	191				
Independent	Gavin Wallace	0.9	40	41	42	42	45					
Liberal Democrats	Mike Watson	0.7	32	33	33	33						
Electorate: 13,021 Valid: 4,569 Spoilt: 135 Quota: 914 Turnout: 35.1%

=== 2007 election ===
Blantyre - 4 seats
Party	Candidate	FPv%	Count					
Party	Candidate	FPv%	1	2	3	4	5	6
Labour	Hugh Dunsmuir	24.6	1,586					
Independent	Bert Thomson (Note: Returning councillor for High Blantyre single-member ward.) (Note: Blantyre councillor Bert Thomson subsequently joined the SNP and ceased to be an independent.)	21.2	1,365					
SNP	John McNamee (Note: On 1 February 2010, Blantyre councillor John McNamee resigned from the SNP and joined Labour.)	19.4	1,253	1,339				
Labour	Jim Handibode (Note: Returning councillor for Coatshill/Low Blantyre single-member ward.)	17.4	1,121	1,260	1,270	???	???	???
Independent	Michael McGlynn (Note: Returning councillor for Blantyre West single-member ward.)	11.6	748	764	783	???	???	???
Conservative	Morag Redpath	5.1	327	329	332	???	???	
Independent	Gavin Wallace	0.8	52	53	66	???		
Electorate: 13,782 Valid: 6,452 Quota: 1,291 Turnout: 48.0%

=== 1992 election ===
Blantyre
Party	Candidate	Votes	%	±%
Labour	J. Handibode	995	70.3	▲34.2
SNP	J. Pollock	409	28.9	New
Majority		586	41.4	N/A
Turnout		1,404	31.4	▼19.2
Registered electors		4,511		
Labour gain from Independent Labour		Swing	▲17.1	

=== 1988 election ===
Blantyre
Party	Candidate	Votes	%	±%
Independent Labour	M. Tremble	1,331	57.4	New
Labour	J. Handibode	837	36.1	▼42.1
Conservative	L. McIntosh	137	5.9	▼2.7
Majority		494	21.3	N/A
Turnout		2,305	50.6	▲7.4
Registered electors		4,575		
Independent Labour gain from Labour		Swing	▲49.7	

=== 1984 election ===
Blantyre
Party	Candidate	Votes	%
Labour	D. Tremble	1,535	78.2
Liberal	D. McWhirter	253	12.9
Conservative	A. Walker	168	8.6
Majority		1,282	65.3
Turnout		1,956	43.2
Registered electors		4,544	
Labour hold			

=== 1980 election ===
Blantyre
Party	Candidate	Votes	%
Labour	M. D. Tremble	Unopposed	
Registered electors		4,718	
Labour hold			

=== 1977 election ===
Blantyre
Party	Candidate	Votes	%	±%
Labour	M. D. Tremble	1,608	61.2	▲4.9
SNP	J. Waugh	1,019	38.8	▼4.9
Majority		589	22.4	▲9.8
Turnout		2,627	55.5	▲0.6
Registered electors		4,784		
Labour hold		Swing	▲4.9	

=== 1974 election ===
Blantyre
Party	Candidate	Votes	%
Labour	D. Tremble	1,412	56.3
SNP	T. Rarity	1,094	43.7
Majority		318	12.6
Turnout		2,506	54.9
Registered electors		4,648	
Labour win (new seat)			
