= Hamilton (Scottish district) =

Former Scottish local government district

Coordinates: 55.75°N 4.05°W

- District
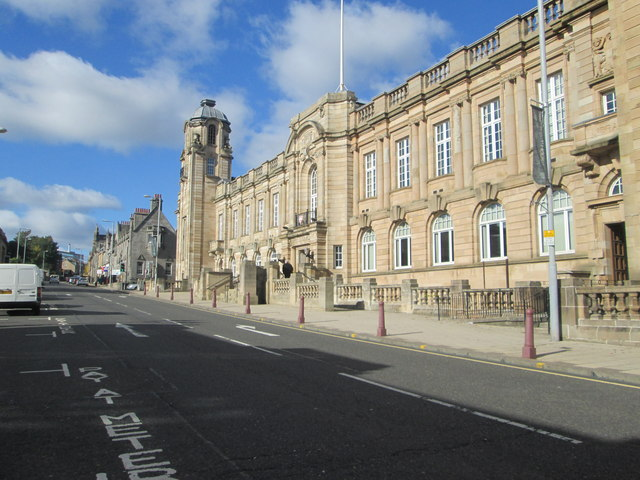
- Council's headquarters: Town House, 102 Cadzow Street, Hamilton

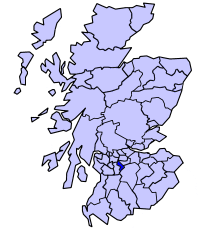
- Hamilton district within Scotland
- Population
  - 1994: 105,202
- History
  - Created: 16 May 1975
  - Abolished: 31 March 1996
  - Succeeded by: (Part of) South Lanarkshire
- Status: District
- Government: Hamilton District Council
  - HQ: Hamilton

Hamilton (Scottish Gaelic: Hamaltan) was a local government district in the Strathclyde region of Scotland from 1975 to 1996, lying to the south-east of the regional capital Glasgow.

== History ==
The district was created in 1975 under the Local Government (Scotland) Act 1973, which established a two-tier structure of local government across mainland Scotland comprising upper-tier regions and lower-tier districts. Hamilton was one of nineteen districts created within the region of Strathclyde. The district covered parts of four former districts from the historic county of Lanarkshire, all of which were abolished at the same time:

- Hamilton Burgh
- Fourth District (except Avondale electoral division, which went to East Kilbride)
- Sixth District (Bothwell and Uddingston South, and Uddingston North electoral divisions only, rest went to Motherwell)
- Eighth District (Blantyre parish, excluding part in East Kilbride new town)

The district took its name from the area's largest town, Hamilton. To the north of Hamilton, the district included the villages of Uddingston and Bothwell and the mining town of Blantyre. To the south, the territory became increasingly rural, and included the towns of Larkhall and the villages of Ashgill and Stonehouse.

The district was abolished in 1996 under the Local Government etc. (Scotland) Act 1994 which replaced regions and districts with unitary council areas. South Lanarkshire council area was formed covering the districts of Clydesdale, East Kilbride, Hamilton, and parts of the City of Glasgow district.

== Political control ==
The first election to the district council was held in 1974, initially operating as a shadow authority alongside the outgoing authorities until it came into its powers on 16 May 1975. Political control of the council from 1975 was as follows:

Party in control	Years
Labour	1975–1977
No overall control	1977–1980
Labour	1980–1996

== Premises ==
The council was based at Town House at 102 Cadzow Street in Hamilton, which had been built between 1906 and 1928 for the former Hamilton Town Council. After the council's abolition in 1996 the building (which already contained a library) was renovated to provide further community use. The successor South Lanarkshire Council retains some offices in the building, but has its headquarters nearby at the Lanark County Buildings, which had been used by Strathclyde Regional Council between 1975 and 1996.

== See also ==
- 1974 Hamilton District Council election
- 1977 Hamilton District Council election
- 1980 Hamilton District Council election
- 1984 Hamilton District Council election
- 1988 Hamilton District Council election
- 1992 Hamilton District Council election
- Subdivisions of Scotland
