= Scottish Liberal Party =

Former political party in Scotland

- Founded: 1859
- Dissolved: 3 March 1988
- Merged into: Scottish Liberal Democrats
- Headquarters: 2 Atholl Place, Edinburgh
- Ideology: Liberalism; Classical liberalism Social liberalism
- National affiliation: Liberal Party

The Scottish Liberal Party, the section of the Liberal Party in Scotland, was the dominant political party of Victorian Scotland, and although its importance declined with the rise of the Labour and Unionist parties during the 20th century, it was still a significant, albeit much reduced force when it finally merged with the Social Democratic Party in Scotland, to form the Scottish Liberal Democrats in 1988.

The party lost its last remaining seats in the UK Parliament in 1945, and continued to decline in popular support in the post war years, with Jo Grimond (who won back Orkney and Shetland in 1950) being the sole Scottish Liberal MP in the House of Commons from 1951 to 1964. The party gained a partial revival in the 1964 general election returning three further MPs; George Mackie, Russell Johnston and Alasdair Mackenzie. A further gain came the following year with David Steel's victory at the Roxburgh, Selkirk and Peebles by-election. Steel went on to become a pivotal figure in the development of Scottish devolution, in partnership with John Smith, Donald Dewar and other key Labour and Liberal figures.

== Victorian Party ==
The Victorian Liberal party in Scotland was not always ideologically unified, and was faced with many internal divisions, particularly amongst the more conservative Whiggish elements of the party who were largely based in Edinburgh and the East, and the more western and Glasgow-based radical Liberals.

The East and North of Scotland Liberal Association and the West and South West of Scotland Liberal Association were founded in 1877. Early in 1881, they merged, forming the Scottish Liberal Association, led by Gladstone and Adam. A National Liberal Federation of Scotland was founded in April 1886, but merged into the Liberal Association in December.

The Scottish Women's Liberal Federation was formed in 1891 from regional groups and was led by Anne Lindsay.

== Leadership ==
=== Chairmen ===
1886: Victor Bruce
1894: Thomas Gibson-Carmichael
1902: Edward Marjoribanks
1906: John William Crombie
1908: Eugene Wason
1909: George Green
1910: Eugene Wason
1912: William Robertson
1921: Donald Maclean
1925: John Anthony
1933: William Baird
1936: Archibald Sinclair
1936: Philip Kerr
1946: Louise Glen-Coats
1948: Leonard T. M. Gray
1952: Louise Glen-Coats
1953: John Gray Wilson
1954: Charles Hampton Johnston
1956: John Bannerman
1965: George Mackie
1970: Russell Johnston
1973: Robert L. Smith
1975: Menzies Campbell
1977: Terry Grieve
1980: Fred McDermid
1982: Ross Finnie
1986: John Lawrie
1987: Christopher Mason

=== Presidents ===
1880s: John Dalrymple
1884: Alexander Duff
1886: Archibald Primrose
1901: Henry Campbell-Bannerman
1909: H. H. Asquith
1928: John Hamilton-Gordon
1934: Ramsay Muir
1935: Archibald Sinclair
1960: Archibald Sinclair and Andrew Murray
1961: Archibald Sinclair
1963: Archibald Sinclair and John Bannerman
1965: John Bannerman
1969: Ray Bannerman (later Ray Michie)
1976: Robert L. Smith
1982: Fred McDermid
1983: George Mackie

=== Leader ===
- Until 1973, the party was led by the president.
- Russell Johnston, 1973–1988

== Electoral performance ==
The Liberals reached their zenith in Scotland at the 1906 general election, where they won over 80% of Scottish seats.

This chart shows the electoral results of the Scottish Liberal Party, from its first election in 1859, to its last in 1983. Total number of seats, and vote percentage, is for Scotland only.

Election	National leader in Scotland	Vote %	Seats	Government
1859	—	66.4	40 / 53	Liberal
1865	—	85.4	42 / 53	Liberal
1868	—	82.5	51 / 58	Liberal
1874	—	68.4	40 / 58	Conservative
1880	—	70.1	52 / 58	Liberal
1885	William Ewart Gladstone for Midlothian	53.3	51 / 70	Liberal minority
1886	William Ewart Gladstone for Midlothian	53.6	43 / 70	Conservative–Liberal Unionist
1892	William Ewart Gladstone for Midlothian	53.9	51 / 70	Liberal minority
1895	—	51.7	39 / 70	Conservative–Liberal Unionist
1900	Sir Henry Campbell-Bannerman for Stirling Burghs	50.2	34 / 70	Conservative–Liberal Unionist
1906	Sir Henry Campbell-Bannerman for Stirling Burghs	56.4	58 / 70	Liberal
Jan 1910	H. H. Asquith for East Fife	54.2	58 / 70	Liberal minority
Dec 1910	H. H. Asquith for East Fife	53.6	57 / 70	Liberal minority
1918	H. H. Asquith for East Fife (defeated)	Official Liberal; 15.0 Coalition Liberal; 19.1	Official Liberal 8 / 71 Coalition Liberal 25 / 71	Coalition Liberal–Conservative
1922	H. H. Asquith for Paisley	Official Liberal; 21.5 National Liberal; 17.7	Official Liberal 15 / 71 National Liberal 12 / 71	Conservative
1923	H. H. Asquith for Paisley	28.4	22 / 71	Labour minority
1924	H. H. Asquith for Paisley	16.6	8 / 71	Conservative
1929	—	18.1	13 / 71	Labour minority
1931	—	8.6	7 / 71	National Labour–Conservative–Liberal
1935	—	6.7	3 / 71	Conservative–National Labour–Liberal National
1945	Sir Archibald Sinclair for Caithness and Sutherland	5.6	0 / 71	Labour
1950	—	6.6	2 / 71	Labour
1951	—	2.7	1 / 71	Conservative
1955	—	1.9	1 / 71	Conservative
1959	Jo Grimond for Orkney and Shetland	4.1	1 / 71	Conservative
1964	Jo Grimond for Orkney and Shetland	7.6	4 / 71	Labour
1966	Jo Grimond for Orkney and Shetland	6.8	5 / 71	Labour
1970	—	5.5	3 / 71	Conservative
February 1974	—	7.9	3 / 71	Labour minority
October 1974	—	8.3	3 / 71	Labour
1979	David Steel for Roxburgh, Selkirk and Peebles	9.0	3 / 71	Conservative
