= Government bill =

Government bill may refer to:

- Government bill (law), a bill introduced or supported by a government in a legislature
- Government bond (also called a government bill), a bond issued by a national government
