= Secure Tenancies (Victims of Domestic Abuse) Act 2018 =

United Kingdom law

- Act of Parliament
- Parliament of the United Kingdom
- Long title: An Act to make provision about the granting of old-style secure tenancies in cases of domestic abuse.
- Citation: 2018 c. 11
- Introduced by: Sajid Javid (Commons); Lord Bourne of Aberystwyth (Lords)
- Territorial extent: England and Wales

Dates
- Royal assent: 10 May 2018
- Commencement: To be confirmed by regulation

Status: Not yet in force

History of passage through Parliament

Text of statute as originally enacted

Revised text of statute as amended

The Secure Tenancies (Victims of Domestic Abuse) Act 2018 (c. 11) is an act of the Parliament of the United Kingdom. The act allows secure tenancies to be given to victims of domestic abuse. It was introduced to Parliament as a government bill by Sajid Javid and Lord Bourne of Aberystwyth of the Department for Communities and Local Government.

== Background ==
The Housing and Planning Act 2016 reduced the security of tenancy agreements, including those for victims of domestic abuse.

According to the 2017 Crime Survey of England and Wales, approximately 1,900,000 people had suffered from domestic abuse in the past year.

== Legislative passage ==
During the parliamentary debate, discussion included topics such as GPs charging fees for proof of domestic abuse.

== Provisions ==
The provisions of the act include:

- Ameding the Housing Act 1985 to add that:

- A local housing authority that grants a secure tenancy of a dwelling-house in England must grant an old-style secure tenancy if—

(a) the tenancy is offered to a person who is or was a tenant of some other dwelling-house under a qualifying tenancy (whether as the sole tenant or as a joint tenant), and

(b) the authority is satisfied that the person or a member of their household is or has been the victim of domestic abuse and that the new tenancy is granted for reasons connected with that abuse

- In the Act, "abuse" is defined as:

(a) Violence
(b) Threatening, intimidating, coercive or controlling behaviour, or
(c) Any other form of abuse, including emotional, financial, physical, psychological or sexual abuse

- In the Act, "domestic abuse" is defined as abuse where the victim is or has been in the same family or household as the abuser or in an intimate personal relationship with the abuser.

== Timetable ==
Through the Lords

The bill was introduced to the House of Lords at its first reading on 19 December 2017. The Bill had its second reading on 9 January 2018 and began its committee stage on 24 January. The Bills third reading was on 13 March 2018 before being passed to the Commons the same day.

Through the Commons

The Bill had its first reading in the House of Commons on 13 March 2018 and its second reading on 19 March. The committee stage started on 27 March and the committee reported on 8 May. The Bill passed its third reading the same day with no amendments.

Royal assent

Royal assent was achieved by May 2018.

== Amendments ==
As of June 2019, there have been no amendments to the Act.

== See also ==
- Housing Act 1980
- Housing Act 1985
