= Medical Training (Prioritisation) Bill =

Proposed United Kingdom legislation

- Bill
- Parliament of the United Kingdom
- Long title: A Bill to Make provision about the prioritisation of graduates from medical schools in the United Kingdom and certain other persons for places on medical training programmes.
- Introduced by: Wes Streeting (Commons); Gillian Merron (Lords)

Status: Not passed

The Medical Training (Prioritisation) Bill is a government bill under consideration in the House of Commons of the United Kingdom.

The bill was introduced in the House of Commons on 13 January 2026.

The Bill is supported by the Royal College of Physicians, the British Medical Association, and the NHS Confederation.
