= The Davinci Foundation for Animals =

Organization

- Founded: 2012; 14 years ago Detroit, Michigan, U.S.
- Type: 501(c)(3)

The Davinci Foundation for Animals (DFA) is an American 501(c)(3) non-profit organization that assists animals in need, both locally and globally. The Foundation is funded through donations and through the support of the arts, which includes but is not limited to artists, authors, musicians, and entertainers. The foundation is the creator of "Davinci Artist/s", a rescue movement that supports and inspires artists of all fields to support rescue and animal welfare through their work.

== History ==
The Davinci Foundation for Animals is a 501(c)(3) organization founded in 2012 in Detroit, Michigan. The foundation supports the welfare of animals globally through a number of different programs which aid, assist, educate and promote awareness. The Foundation also supports animal rights. The inspiration for the Davinci Foundation for Animals was a dog named Davinci, a Dachshund mix who was found shortly after his birth on December 11, 2011, by professional sports entertainers Michael and Candilynn Lockhart, betterknown as "Dylan Night and Candi". The Lockharts left the Sports Entertainment Industry in late 2011, due to Candilynn's inability to continue the physical intensive profession after being diagnosed with M. S, and being a long-time sufferer of Crohn's disease. The couple returned to their hometown of Detroit, and on December 11, 2011, while photographing the city's architecture, stumbled upon a dog giving birth in a snow-covered alley.

== Focused missions ==
Dedicated to animal advocacy, the focus of the Davinci Foundation for Animals are:

- Work directly to address the pet population crisis.
- Increase awareness of the inhumane treatment of animals.
- Support non-profit animal rescue and advocacy organizations in their efforts to save shelter animals.
- Assist homeless shelter and rescue animals by financing medical treatment and veterinary care.
- Fund and encourage free or low cost spay / neuter programs and clinics.
- Place rescue dogs and cats in loving homes.
- Provide safe havens for animals that have been abused or neglected.
- Educate the public about the horrors of puppy mills and dog fighting.
- Ensure that perpetrators of animal abuse are held accountable and prosecuted to the full extent of the law.

== Early achievements ==
In their first year, through the support of sponsors and partners, the foundation initiated a spay/neuter program, to assist eliminating the overpopulation of unwanted companion animals, and an education program against the abandoning of pets onto the city streets. For their efforts Davinci, the organisation's "spoke's dog" was given several awards including Angel on a leash, a humanitarian Purple Heart in Washington DC by President Barack Obama, and the "Heart of Detroit" by Detroit native and New York Times Best selling author Mitch Albom.

In addition to local welfare initiatives, co-founder Candilynn Lockhart has worked as a dog travel writer, featuring the organization's namesake dog, DaVinci, in travel coverage.

== Sanctuary ==
The foundation maintains an internal sanctuary, located in Macomb, Michigan, at the former John Whitney Historical estate now called Hugs and Whiskers home. The sanctuary focuses on the care of permanent animal residents who have come from a number of rescue situations, or who were in immediate danger in high-kill shelters or Puppy Mills. Many of the dog and cats in the DFA Sanctuary have suffered neglect, abandonment and abuse.
