= Lisa Cameron =

Scottish politician (born 1972)

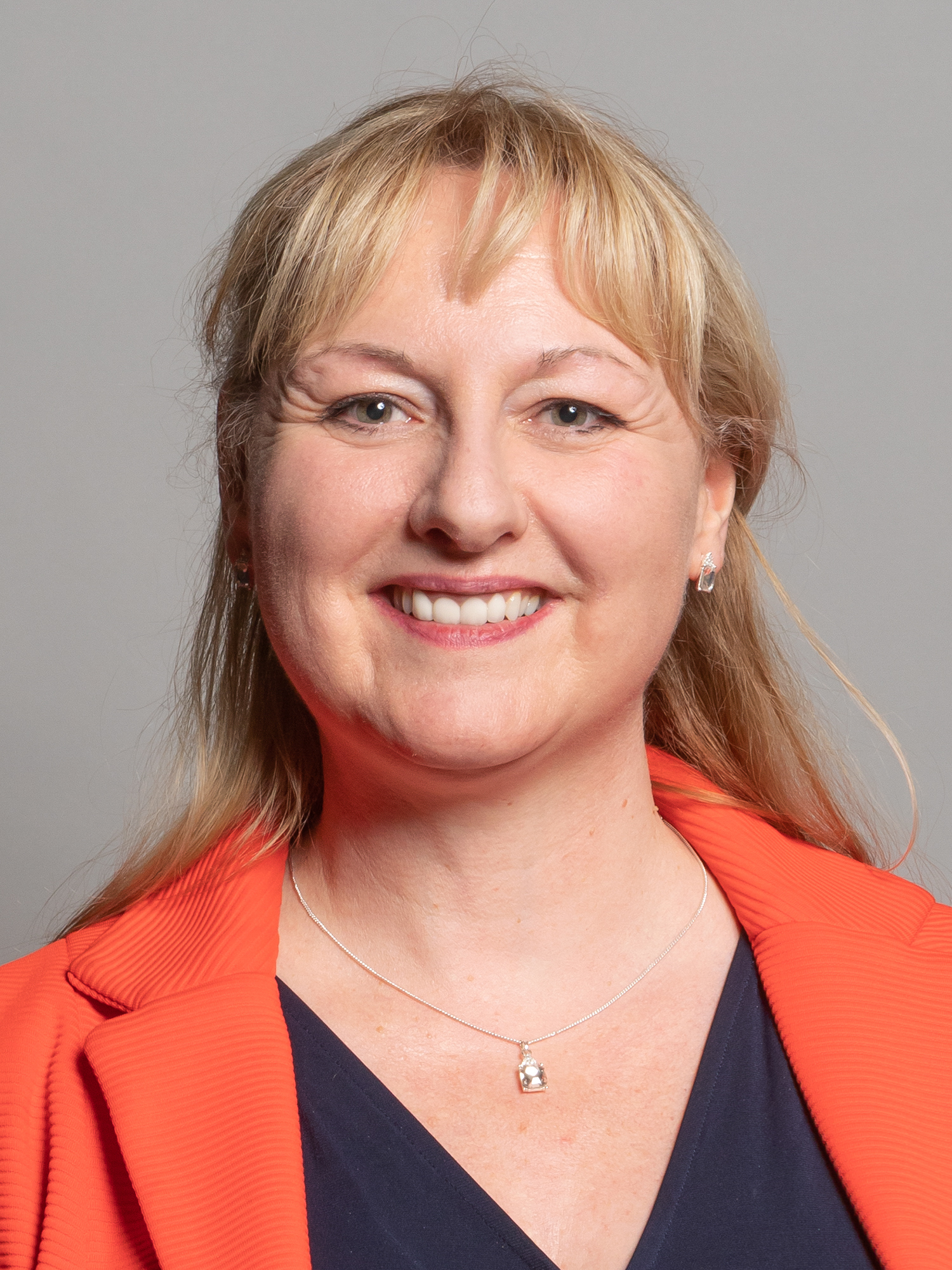
- Official portrait, 2020

Member of Parliament for East Kilbride, Strathaven and Lesmahagow
- In office 7 May 2015 – 30 May 2024
- Preceded by: Michael McCann
- Succeeded by: Joani Reid

Personal details
- Born: 8 April 1972 (age 54) Glasgow, Scotland
- Party: Conservative (2023–present)
- Other political affiliations: Scottish National Party (2014–2023)
- Spouse: Mark Horsham (m. 2009)
- Children: 2
- Education: University of Strathclyde (BSc); University of Stirling (MSc); University of Glasgow (DClinPsy)
- Awards: Ordine di Sant'Agata

Lisa Cameron (born 8 April 1972) is a Scottish politician and former consultant clinical psychologist who served as the Member of Parliament (MP) for East Kilbride, Strathaven and Lesmahagow from winning the seat at the 2015 general election until standing down at the 2024 general election. First elected for the Scottish National Party (SNP), she was re-elected for that party in 2017 and 2019, before she crossed the floor to the Scottish Conservatives in October 2023.

== Early life and career ==
Lisa Cameron was born on 8 April 1972 in Glasgow, Scotland or Westwood, East Kilbride, where she grew up. Her father moved to America when she was an infant and she was raised by her mother, a secretary at Rolls-Royce and "working class conservative", and a taxi driver. She was educated at South Park Primary School, East Milton Primary School and Duncanrig Secondary School, before studying psychology at the University of Strathclyde where she graduated as BSc. Cameron pursued further studies in Psychology and Health at the University of Stirling receiving an MSc. degree before taking a DClinPsy. degree from the University of Glasgow. After university, Cameron specialised in forensic and clinical psychology. She worked as a consultant at the State Hospital, as a clinical psychologist in the NHS and as an assessor for the Scottish Risk Management Authority.

Cameron voted in favour of Scottish independence at the 2014 Scottish independence referendum. After the referendum results were announced, in which Scotland voted to remain part of the United Kingdom; she joined the Scottish National Party (SNP). Cameron spent over a decade as a trade union representative for Unite.

== Parliamentary career ==
=== 2015 Parliament ===
Cameron was elected as an SNP MP for the East Kilbride, Strathaven and Lesmahagow seat at the 2015 UK general election. The seat and its predecessor, East Kilbride had been won by successive Labour Party candidates since 1974.

Cameron is the first clinical psychologist to be elected as an MP to the House of Commons. During the 2015–17 Parliament, Cameron was a member of the International Development Committee and the International Development Sub-Committee on the Work of the Independent Commission for Aid Impact.

On 5 January 2016, the Scottish Daily Mail published a story highlighting that Cameron owned five ex-council houses (managed by her husband) despite campaigning against the sale of council houses at the 2015 general election. She responded by stating that she had been transparent in her property dealings and had declared ownership of the properties per parliamentary rules in her register of interests. Cameron made a complaint about the article to the Independent Press Standards Organisation (IPSO), which was not upheld.

=== 2017 Parliament ===
Cameron retained her seat at the 2017 snap general election with 21,023 votes and both a reduced vote share and a majority of 3,866 votes. The SNP lost one third of their MPs at this election. Following the election, Cameron was elected to be part of the Health Select Committee and the Commons Reference Group on Representation and Inclusion. She was the chair of the All-Party Parliamentary Groups (APPGs) on Health, Chile, Disability, Dog Advisory Welfare, Psychology, Textile and Fashion and co-chair of the APPG on New Towns. She was also a vice-chair on the Pro-Life APPG.

In 2017, Cameron launched the successful Lucy's Law campaign in the House of Commons against puppy farming which became statute in 2019. In 2018, Cameron led the Ivory Bill for the SNP through the House of Commons.

In 2019, Cameron described receiving abusive messages and threats with deselection after voting against legalising abortion in Northern Ireland in a conscience vote. An SNP assessor reportedly said he would recommend anyone with these views should have their application rejected to be a candidate and she should "quit her position as an elected representative."

In September 2019, Cameron's local SNP branch passed a motion which criticised the National Executive Committee's decision “to impose Dr Lisa Cameron as the party's candidate in the forthcoming General Election for the second time". Despite this, Cameron was reselected.

=== 2019 Parliament ===
==== 2019 - 2023: Sitting as SNP MP ====
Cameron was returned to Parliament at the 2019 general election with a majority of 13,322.

On 29 June 2020, Cameron was the only SNP MP to vote on a motion to introduce a Bill to restrict anti-abortion demonstrations near abortion clinics in England. She voted against the motion, submitted on her behalf by the SNP Chief Whip. Cameron claimed to receive over 3,000 "thank you notes" from people across Scotland supporting her anti-abortion stance. Cameron later revealed that she had received a death threat as a result of her vote.

Cameron received an Award for Distinguished Contribution to Practice of Psychology from the British Psychological Society in 2020 for her work as a psychologist in NHS Scotland and on mental health in Parliament. Cameron was reportedly given the title in 2021 as SNP Parliamentary Carers Champion for Carers Week.

In 2021, Cameron helped set up the All-Party Parliamentary Group (APPG) for Crypto and Digital Assets and, in 2022, Cameron was appointed Chair of the APPG. In October of that year, Cameron was awarded the Order of Saint Agatha by the Republic of San Marino.

In January 2023, the UK Government took the unprecedented decision to intervene in blocking the Scottish Government's Gender Recognition Reform (Scotland) Bill, despite this policy area being a fully devolved competency for the Scottish Government. In response, Cameron wrote to Conservative Scottish Secretary Alister Jack, calling on him to "find a resolution" in a way that didn't undermine the devolution settlement.

==== September-October 2023: "Ostracisation" and defection to Conservative Party ====
In September 2023, Cameron, who had chosen to re-contest selection for her seat at the next election, was one of five sitting SNP MPs involved in selection contests. Cameron publicly threatened to resign, and call a by-election if SNP members did not nominate her as the candidate. Cameron then spoke of falling out with the party leadership the year before over its handling of an MP who was suspended for making a sexual advance to a staff member, but was welcomed back by the party post-suspension.

On 12 October, the day the result of her selection vote was to be announced, Cameron defected from the SNP to the Conservative Party. Grant Costello, who was leading in the selection contest, was named SNP candidate for East Kilbride and Strathaven later that day.

On 13 October, Cameron said she and her family had to go into hiding after death threats following her defection.

Humza Yousaf claimed that Cameron's defection was the "least-surprising news I've had as leader of the SNP", and called on her to resign as an MP. Prime Minister, and Conservative Party Leader, Rishi Sunak hailed Cameron's decision as "brave".

In an interview with The Herald, Cameron said that "many factors" contributed to her defection, including a "difficult relationship with the party leadership". Cameron also said she could not have joined the Labour Party due to her Christianity and views on transgender rights, citing the experiences of her friend Rosie Duffield. Later that month, Cameron told BBC Radio 4's Women's Hour she had also changed her views regarding Scottish independence, stating "“I feel like Scotland’s exhausted by nationalism and all of our services are exhausted now. It’s become very divisive".

==== Post-defection parliamentary career ====
Shortly after her defection, Cameron announced she would not be standing as the next at the next general election, citing the "trauma of receiving threats of violence within a toxic local political context".

In June 2024, she was unsuccessful in the selection contest to succeed John Redwood in his Wokingham seat. After this news, Cameron confirmed that she would not be seeking re-election, but said she hoped the UK “would see a positive election campaign”.

In December 2023, it was announced that Cameron had been made Parliamentary Private Secretary for Scottish Secretary Alister Jack.

=== Disability activism ===
Throughout her parliamentary career, Cameron was a strong parliamentary advocate on disability rights in the United Kingdom.

She chaired the Disability All Party Parliamentary Group in the House of Commons from 2015 to 2024, and became one of the few Disability Confident Level 2 employers, also asking then Prime Minister Boris Johnson to sign up to this scheme. Cameron also frequently led on debates and hosted numerous events in Parliament relating to disability issues during her time as a Member of Parliament.

Cameron has received several awards in recognition of her activism. In 2022, she received the MP of the Year Award from Patchwork Foundation for her disability activism and campaigns against online abuse. That same year Speaker of the House of Commons, Sir Lindsay Hoyle, presented Cameron with an Award and praised her "indefatigable campaigning" on disability. In March 2024, Cameron was awarded with a lifetime award for services to disability by disability charity Universal Inclusion presented to her by the then Minister for State for Disabled People, Mims Davies.

== Post-parliamentary career ==
Since leaving Parliament, Cameron has founded the UKUS Crypto Alliance, a think tank which seeks to foster alignment in Crypto policy between the United States and the United Kingdom, and is the founder and President of The Finance Club, a professional network for those working in the financial and technology sectors. She is also Chair of the Digital Legislators Forum in Digital Assets, and works as an advisor for a number of Digital Assets companies.

== Personal life ==
Cameron has been married to Mark Horsham since 2009, and they have two daughters and live in South Lanarkshire.

From 2017 to 2023, Horsham was a councillor for the Clydesdale South ward on for South Lanarkshire Council. He was the council's Veteran's Champion, and won an Award as New Councillor of the Year in Scotland 2020. Following Cameron's defection, Horsham announced he was "stepping back" from his duties as an SNP councillor, ultimately resigining on 23 October 2023 due to threats received towards his family.

Cameron attends the evangelical Free Church of Scotland.

Parliament of the United Kingdom
Preceded by Michael McCann	Member of Parliament for East Kilbride, Strathaven and Lesmahagow; 2015–2024	Constituency abolished
