= List of statutory rules of Northern Ireland, 2018 =

This is a list of statutory rules made in the Northern Ireland in the year 2018.

== 1-100 ==
Number	Title
1 (C. 1)	The Welfare Reform (Northern Ireland) Order 2015 (Commencement No. 10 and Transitional and Transitory Provisions and Commencement No. 9 and Transitional and Transitory Provisions (Amendment)) Order 2018
2	The Housing Benefit (Executive Determinations) (Amendment) Regulations (Northern Ireland) 2018
3	The Misuse of Drugs (Designation) (Amendment) Order (Northern Ireland) 2018
4	The Misuse of Drugs (Amendment) Regulations (Northern Ireland) 2018
5	The Offshore Electricity Development (Environmental Impact Assessment) (Revocation) Regulations (Northern Ireland) 2018
6 & 7	Not Allocated
8	The Education (Recognised Bodies) Order (Northern Ireland) 2018
9	The Education (Listed Bodies) Order (Northern Ireland) 2018
10	The Parking Places (Disabled Persons’ Vehicles) (Amendment) Order (Northern Ireland) 2018
11	The Waiting Restrictions (Ballintoy) Order (Northern Ireland) 2018
12	The Parking and Waiting Restrictions (Moy) (Amendment) Order (Northern Ireland) 2018
13	The Woodtown Road, Ballymena (Abandonment) Order (Northern Ireland) 2018
14	The B78 Tandragee Road, Portadown (Abandonment) Order (Northern Ireland) 2018
15	The Parking Places on Roads, Loading Bay and Waiting Restrictions (Newcastle) Order (Northern Ireland) 2018
16	The Animal Feed (Basic Safety Standards) Regulations (Northern Ireland) 2018
17	The Ionising Radiation (Medical Exposure) Regulations (Northern Ireland) 2018
18	The Areas of Natural Constraint Regulations (Northern Ireland) 2018
19	The One-Way Traffic (Belfast) (Amendment) Order (Northern Ireland) 2018
20	The U7882 Old Road, Poyntzpass (Abandonment) Order (Northern Ireland) 2018
21	The Parking Places, Loading Bays and Waiting Restrictions (Coleraine) (Amendment) Order (Northern Ireland) 2018
22	The New Line, Carrickfergus (Abandonment) Order (Northern Ireland) 2018
23 (C. 2)	The Pensions (2008 No. 2 Act) (Commencement No. 12) Order (Northern Ireland) 2018
24	The Crown Court (Amendment) Rules (Northern Ireland) 2018
25	The Magistrates’ Courts (Amendment) Rules (Northern Ireland) 2018
26	The Pension Protection Fund (Compensation) (Amendment) Regulations (Northern Ireland) 2018
27	The Annesborough Industrial Estate, Annesborough Road, Lurgan (Abandonment) Order (Northern Ireland) 2018
28	The Pension Schemes Act 2015 (Judicial Pensions) (Consequential Provision) Regulations (Northern Ireland) 2018 (revoked)
29	The Private Accesses on the A1 Banbridge Bypass (Stopping-Up) Order (Northern Ireland) 2018
30	The A1 Dual Carriageway (between Springwell Loanin and Castlewellan Road Bridge), Banbridge (Stopping-Up) Order (Northern Ireland) 2018
31	The Waiting Restrictions (Holywood) (Amendment) Order (Northern Ireland) 2018
32	The Prohibition of Waiting (Schools) (Amendment) Order (Northern Ireland) 2018
33	The Pollution Prevention and Control (Industrial Emissions) (Amendment) Regulations (Northern Ireland) 2018
34 (C. 3)	The Policing and Crime Act 2017 (Commencement No. 1) Order (Northern Ireland) 2018
35	The Education (Student Support) (Amendment) Regulations (Northern Ireland) 2018
36	The Universal Credit Housing Costs (Executive Determinations) (Amendment) Regulations (Northern Ireland) 2018
37	The Loans for Mortgage Interest and Social Fund Maternity Grant (Amendment) Regulations (Northern Ireland) 2018
38	The Pension Protection Fund and Occupational Pension Schemes (Levy Ceiling and Compensation Cap) Order (Northern Ireland) 2018 (revoked)
39	The Social Security Revaluation of Earnings Factors Order (Northern Ireland) 2018
40	The Pension Schemes Act 2015 (Transitional Provisions and Appropriate Independent Advice) (Amendment) Regulations (Northern Ireland) 2018
41 (C. 4)	The Pensions (2015 Act) (Commencement No. 6) Order (Northern Ireland) 2018
42	The Guaranteed Minimum Pensions Increase Order (Northern Ireland) 2018
43 (C. 5)	The Pension Schemes (2016 Act) (Commencement No. 1) Order (Northern Ireland) 2018
44	The Valuation Tribunal (Amendment) Rules (Northern Ireland) 2018
45	The Social Fund Funeral Expenses (Amendment) Regulations (Northern Ireland) 2018
46	The Pension Schemes Act 2015 (Transitional Provisions and Appropriate Independent Advice) (Amendment No. 2) Regulations (Northern Ireland) 2018 (revoked)
47	The Road Races (Easter Stages Rally) Order (Northern Ireland) 2018
48	The Road Races (Croft Hill Climb) Order (Northern Ireland) 2018
49	The Occupational Pension Schemes (Employer Debt and Miscellaneous Amendments) Regulations (Northern Ireland) 2018
50	The Social Security (Invalid Care Allowance) (Amendment) Regulations (Northern Ireland) 2018 (revoked)
51	The Contracting-out (Transfer and Transfer Payment) (Amendment) Regulations (Northern Ireland) 2018
52	The Automatic Enrolment (Earnings Trigger and Qualifying Earnings Band) Order (Northern Ireland) 2018 (revoked)
53	The Occupational Pension Schemes (Administration and Disclosure) (Amendment) Regulations (Northern Ireland) 2018
54	The Occupational Pension Schemes (Preservation of Benefit and Charges and Governance) (Amendment) Regulations (Northern Ireland) 2018
55	The Mesothelioma Lump Sum Payments (2017 Conditions and Amounts) (Amendment) Regulations (Northern Ireland) 2018
56	The Social Security (2017 Benefits Up-rating) Order (Northern Ireland) 2018 (revoked)
57	The Social Security (2017 Benefits Up-rating) Regulations (Northern Ireland) 2018 (revoked)
58	The Social Security Benefits Up-rating Order (Northern Ireland) 2018 (revoked)
59	The Mesothelioma Lump Sum Payments (Conditions and Amounts) (Amendment) Regulations (Northern Ireland) 2018 (revoked)
60	The Social Security Benefits Up-rating Regulations (Northern Ireland) 2018 (revoked)
61	The Rates (Small Business Hereditament Relief) (Amendment) Regulations (Northern Ireland) 2018
62	The Public Service Pensions Revaluation Order (Northern Ireland) 2018
63	The Pensions Increase (Review) Order (Northern Ireland) 2018
64	The Human Medicines (Amendment) Regulations 2018
65	The Bereavement Support Payment Regulations (Northern Ireland) 2018 (revoked)
66 (C. 6)	The Welfare Reform and Work (Northern Ireland) Order 2016 (Commencement No. 4) Order 2018
67	The Valuation (Telecommunications, Natural Gas and Water) (Amendment) Regulations (Northern Ireland) 2018
68	The New NAV List (Time of Valuation) Order (Northern Ireland) 2018
69	The Employment Rights (Increase of Limits) Order (Northern Ireland) 2018 (revoked)
70	The Parking Places (Disabled Persons’ Vehicles) (Amendment No. 2) Order (Northern Ireland) 2018
71	The Parking and Waiting Restrictions (Glengormley) Order (Northern Ireland) 2018
72	The Crescent Link, Londonderry (Abandonment) Order (Northern Ireland) 2018
73	The Gardiners Cross Road, Maguiresbridge (Abandonment) Order (Northern Ireland) 2018
74	The Linsfort Drive, Londonderry (Abandonment) Order (Northern Ireland) 2018
75	The U1371 (unnamed road) off Long Lane, Portadown (Abandonment) Order (Northern Ireland) 2018
76	The Limavady Road, Garvagh (Abandonment) Order (Northern Ireland) 2018
77	The Condensed Milk and Dried Milk Regulations (Northern Ireland) 2018
78	The Jam and Similar Products Regulations (Northern Ireland) 2018
79 (C. 7)	The Employment Act (Northern Ireland) 2016 (Commencement No. 2) Order (Northern Ireland) 2018
80	The Employment Rights (Increase of Limits) (No. 2) Order (Northern Ireland) 2018
81	The Road Races (Drumhorc Hill Climb) Order (Northern Ireland) 2018
82	The Road Races (Cookstown 100) Order (Northern Ireland) 2018
83	The Road Races (Craigantlet Hill Climb) Order (Northern Ireland) 2018
84	The Road Races (Tandragee 100) Order (Northern Ireland) 2018
85	The Motor Vehicles Testing (Amendment) Regulations (Northern Ireland) 2018
86	The Goods Vehicles (Testing) (Amendment) Regulations (Northern Ireland) 2018
87	The Motor Vehicles (Construction and Use) (Amendment) Regulations (Northern Ireland) 2018
88	The Road Vehicles Lighting (Amendment) Regulations (Northern Ireland) 2018
89	The Public Service Vehicles (Amendment) Regulations (Northern Ireland) 2018
90	The Taxi Licensing (Amendment) Regulations (Northern Ireland) 2018
91	The Waste (Fees and Charges) (Amendment) Regulations (Northern Ireland) 2018
92	The Universal Credit (Persons Required to Provide Information, Miscellaneous Amendments and Saving and Transitional Provision) Regulations (Northern Ireland) 2018
93	The Road Races (Tour of the Sperrins Rally) Order (Northern Ireland) 2018
94	The Whole of Government Accounts (Designation of Bodies) Order (Northern Ireland) 2018
95	The Road Races (Spamount Hill Climb) Order (Northern Ireland) 2018
96	The Road Races (North West 200) Order (Northern Ireland) 2018
97 (C. 8)	The Welfare Reform (Northern Ireland) Order 2015 (Commencement No. 11 and Transitional and Transitory Provisions) Order 2018
98	The Social Security (Fines) (Deductions from Benefits) Regulations (Northern Ireland) 2018
99 (C. 9)	The Justice (2016 Act) (Commencement No.2) Order (Northern Ireland) 2018
100	The Enforcement of Fines and Other Penalties (Revocations) Order (Northern Ireland) 2018

== 101-200 ==
Number	Title
101	The Magistrates’ Courts Fees (Amendment) Order (Northern Ireland) 2018
102	The Enforcement of Fines and Other Penalties Regulations (Northern Ireland) 2018
103	The Magistrates’ Courts (Amendment No.2) Rules (Northern Ireland) 2018
104	The Quality of Bathing Water (Amendment) Regulations (Northern Ireland) 2018
105	The Student Fees (Amounts) (Amendment) Regulations (Northern Ireland) 2018
106	The Sea Fishing (Illegal, Unreported and Unregulated Fishing) Order (Northern Ireland) 2018
107	Not Allocated
108	The Attorney General's Human Rights Guidance (Domestic Abuse and Stalking) Order (Northern Ireland) 2018
109	The Rate Relief (Amendment) Regulations (Northern Ireland) 2018
110	The Attorney General's Human Rights Guidance (The Application of Section 5 of the Criminal Law Act (Northern Ireland) 1967 to Rape Victims and Those to Whom They Make Disclosures in Connection With a Claim for Social Security, Child Tax Credit or Anonymous Registration on the Electoral Roll) Order (Northern Ireland) 2018
111	The Parking Places (Disabled Persons’ Vehicles) (Amendment No. 3) Order (Northern Ireland) 2018
112	The Parking Places on Roads (Coaches) (Amendment) Order (Northern Ireland) 2018
113	The Waiting Restrictions (Comber) Order (Northern Ireland) 2018
114	The Parking Places on Roads (Comber) Order (Northern Ireland) 2018
115 (C. 10)	The Rural Needs (2016 Act) (Commencement No. 2) Order (Northern Ireland) 2018
116	The Radioactive Substances (Modification of Enactments) Regulations (Northern Ireland) 2018
117	The Hillsborough Road, Moneyreagh (Abandonment and Stopping-Up) Order (Northern Ireland) 2018
118	The Station Road, Moira (Abandonment) Order (Northern Ireland) 2018
119	The M1 Motorway Westbound Off-slip at Tamnamore Roundabout, Dungannon (Abandonment) Order (Northern Ireland) 2018
120	The C161 Derrycarne Road, Portadown (Abandonment) Order (Northern Ireland) 2018
121	The Personal Independence Payment (Amendment) Regulations (Northern Ireland) 2018
122	The Common Agricultural Policy Basic Payment and Support Schemes (Revocation) Regulations (Northern Ireland) 2018
123	The Northern Ireland Social Care Council (Appointments and Procedure) (Amendment) Regulations (Northern Ireland) 2018
124	The Bus Lanes (Belfast Rapid Transit, East and West Corridors) Order (Northern Ireland) 2018
125	The Bus Lanes (Belfast City Centre) Order (Northern Ireland) 2018
126	The Road Races (Cairncastle Hill Climb) Order (Northern Ireland) 2018
127	The Road Races (Enniskillen Motorcycle Road Race) Order (Northern Ireland) 2018
128 (C. 11)	The Policing and Crime Act 2017 (Commencement No.2) Order (Northern Ireland) 2018
129	The Protection of Freedoms Act 2012 (Relevant Official Records) Order (Northern Ireland) 2018
130	The Whole of Government Accounts (Designation of Bodies) (No.2) Order (Northern Ireland) 2018
131	The Industrial Training Levy (Construction Industry) Order (Northern Ireland) 2018
132	The Motor Vehicles (Driving Licences) (Amendment) Regulations (Northern Ireland) 2018
133	The Road Races (Armoy Motorcycle Road Race) Order (Northern Ireland) 2018
134	The Road Races (Down Rally) Order (Northern Ireland) 2018
135	The State Pension Credit (Additional Amount for Child or Qualifying Young Person) (Amendment) Regulations (Northern Ireland) 2018
136	The Agriculture (Student fees)(Amendment) Regulations (Northern Ireland) 2018
137	The Water Environment (Floods Directive) (Amendment) Regulations (Northern Ireland) 2018
138 (C. 12)	The Welfare Reform (Northern Ireland) Order 2015 (Commencement No. 12 and Transitional and Transitory Provisions and Commencement No. 9, 10 and 11 and Transitional and Transitory Provisions (Amendment)) Order 2018
139	The Education (Recognised Bodies) (Amendment) Order (Northern Ireland) 2018
140	The Road Races (Ulster Grand Prix Bike Week) Order (Northern Ireland) 2018
141	The Road Races (Garron Point Hill Climb) Order (Northern Ireland) 2018
142	The Road Races (Ulster Rally) Order (Northern Ireland) 2018
143	The Bus Lane (Belfast Rapid Transit, Station Street Flyover) Order (Northern Ireland) 2018
144	The Bus Lanes (Belfast Rapid Transit, East and West Corridors) (Amendment) Order (Northern Ireland) 2018
145	The Road Races (Eagles Rock Hill Climb) Order (Northern Ireland) 2018
146	The Parking and Waiting Restrictions (Belfast) Order (Northern Ireland) 2018
147	The Pension Schemes Act 2015 (Judicial Pensions) (Consequential Provision No. 2) Regulations (Northern Ireland) 2018 (revoked)
148	The Road Races (Knockagh Hill Climb) Order (Northern Ireland) 2018
149	The Social Security (Miscellaneous Amendments) Regulations (Northern Ireland) 2018
150	The Social Security (Treatment of Arrears of Benefit) Regulations (Northern Ireland) 2018
151	The Social Security (Industrial Injuries) (Prescribed Diseases) (Amendment) Regulations (Northern Ireland) 2018
152	The Prohibition of Waiting (Schools) (Amendment No. 2) Order (Northern Ireland) 2018
153	The Prohibition of Waiting (Schools) (Amendment No. 3) Order (Northern Ireland) 2018
154	The Parking Places (Disabled Persons’ Vehicles) (Amendment No. 4) Order (Northern Ireland) 2018
155	The Control of Traffic (“The Dark Hedges”) (Amendment) Order (Northern Ireland) 2018
156	The Schools (Part-Time 20 mph Speed Limit) Order (Northern Ireland) 2018
157	The Roads (Speed Limit) Order (Northern Ireland) 2018
158	The One-Way Traffic (Dungannon) (Amendment) Order (Northern Ireland) 2018
159	The Ferrard Meadow, Antrim (Abandonment) Order (Northern Ireland) 2018
160	The Annaghilla Road, Augher, Dungannon (Abandonment) Order (Northern Ireland) 2018
161	The Waiting Restrictions (Moneymore) Order (Northern Ireland) 2018
162	The Parking and Waiting Restrictions (Larne) (Amendment) Order (Northern Ireland) 2018
163	The Roads (Speed Limit) (No. 2) Order (Northern Ireland) 2018
164	The Parking and Waiting Restrictions (Newtownards) Order (Northern Ireland) 2018
165	The Pension Protection Fund (Pensionable Service) and Occupational Pension Schemes (Investment and Disclosure) (Amendment and Modification) Regulations (Northern Ireland) 2018
166	The Bereavement Support Payment (No.2) Regulations (Northern Ireland) 2018 (revoked)
167	The Social Security Benefits Up-rating (No. 2) Order (Northern Ireland) 2018 (revoked)
168	The Mesothelioma Lump Sum Payments (Conditions and Amounts) (Amendment No. 2) Regulations (Northern Ireland) 2018 (revoked)
169	The Social Security Benefits Up-rating (No. 2) Regulations (Northern Ireland) 2018 (revoked)
170	The Pension Schemes Act 2015 (Transitional Provisions and Appropriate Independent Advice) (Amendment No. 3) Regulations (Northern Ireland) 2018 (revoked)
171	The Ship Recycling Facilities (Amendment) Regulations (Northern Ireland) 2018
172	The Social Security (Claims and Payments) (Amendment) Regulations (Northern Ireland) 2018
173	The Misuse of Drugs (Amendment No.2) Regulations (Northern Ireland) 2018
174	The Misuse of Drugs (Designation) (Amendment No.2) Order (Northern Ireland) 2018
175	The Loading Bays on Roads (Amendment) Order (Northern Ireland) 2018
176	Not Allocated
177	The One-Way Traffic (Newry) Order (Northern Ireland) 2018
178	The Pond Park Road and Beanstown Road, Lisburn (Stopping-Up) Order (Northern Ireland) 2018
179	The Parking and Waiting Restrictions (Portadown) Order (Northern Ireland) 2018
180	The Motor Hackney Carriages (Londonderry) Bye-Laws (Amendment) Order (Northern Ireland) 2018
181	The Extinguishment of Right to Use Vehicles on Roads (Londonderry) (Amendment) Order (Northern Ireland) 2018
182	The Occupational Pension Schemes (Cross-border Activities) (Amendment) Regulations (Northern Ireland) 2018
183	The Marketing of Ornamental Plant Propagating Material (Amendment) Regulations (Northern Ireland) 2018
184	The Plant Health Order (Northern Ireland) 2018 (revoked)
185	The Sea Fishing (Miscellaneous Amendments and Revocations) Order (Northern Ireland) 2018
186	The Materials and Articles in Contact with Food (Amendment) Regulations (Northern Ireland) 2018
187	The Universal Credit and Jobseeker's Allowance (Miscellaneous Amendments) Regulations (Northern Ireland) 2018
188	The Pesticides, Genetically Modified Organisms and Fertilisers (Miscellaneous Amendments) Regulations (Northern Ireland) 2018
189	Not Allocated
190	The Environmental Noise (Amendment) Regulations (Northern Ireland) 2018
191	The Beef and Veal Labelling (Amendment) Regulations (Northern Ireland) 2018
192	The Social Fund and Income-Related Benefits (Miscellaneous Amendments and Savings) Regulations (Northern Ireland) 2018
193	The Harbour Works (Environmental Impact Assessment) (Revocation) Regulations (Northern Ireland) 2018
194	The Sex Discrimination Order 1976 (Amendment) Regulations (Northern Ireland) 2018
195	The Recovery of Health Services Charges (Amounts) (Amendment) Regulations (Northern Ireland) 2018
196	The Water Environment (Floods Directive) (Amendment No. 2) Regulations (Northern Ireland) 2018
197	The Parking Places on Roads and Waiting Restrictions (Dungannon) Order (Northern Ireland) 2018
198	The Parking Places on Roads and Waiting Restrictions (Cookstown) Order (Northern Ireland) 2018
199	The Parking Places on Roads and Waiting Restrictions (Magherafelt) Order (Northern Ireland) 2018
200	The Environment (Miscellaneous Amendments) Regulations (Northern Ireland) 2018

=== 201-216 ===
Number	Title
201	The Waiting Restrictions (Toome) Order (Northern Ireland) 2018
202	The Parking and Waiting Restrictions (Londonderry) (Amendment) Order (Northern Ireland) 2018
203	The Schools (Part-Time 20 mph Speed Limit) (Amendment) Order (Northern Ireland) 2018
204	The Zootechnical Standards Regulations (Northern Ireland) 2018
205	The Occupational Pensions (Revaluation) Order (Northern Ireland) 2018
206	The Fluorinated Greenhouse Gases (Amendment) Regulations (Northern Ireland) 2018
207	The State Pension Revaluation for Transitional Pensions Order (Northern Ireland) 2018
208	The State Pension Debits and Credits (Revaluation) Order (Northern Ireland) 2018
209	The Housing Benefit and Universal Credit Housing Costs (Executive Determinations) (Amendment) Regulations (Northern Ireland) 2018
210	The Child Support (Miscellaneous Amendments) Regulations (Northern Ireland) 2018 (revoked)
211	The Optical Charges and Payments (Amendment) Regulations (Northern Ireland) 2018
212	The Social Security (Reciprocal Agreement) (Isle of Man) (Amendment) Order (Northern Ireland) 2018
213	The Transmissible Spongiform Encephalopathies Regulations (Northern Ireland) 2018
214	The Occupational Pension Schemes (Governance) (Amendment) Regulations (Northern Ireland) 2018
215	The Air Quality (Amendment, etc.) Regulations (Northern Ireland) 2018
216	The Carcase Classification and Price Reporting Regulations (Northern Ireland) 2018

== See also ==
- List of acts of the Northern Ireland Assembly
- List of acts of the Parliament of the United Kingdom from 2018
