= Lucy's Law =

English law regulating the sale of pets

Animal Welfare (Licensing of Activities Involving Animals) (England) (Amendment) Regulations 2019
- Statutory Instrument
- Parliament of the United Kingdom
- Citation: SI 2019/2093

Dates
- Made: 8 July 2019
- Commencement: 6 April 2020

Other legislation
- Amends: Animal Welfare (Licensing of Activities Involving Animals) (England) Regulations 2018 (SI 2018/486)
- Made under: Animal Welfare Act 2006

Status: Current legislation

Text of statute as originally enacted

Text of the Animal Welfare (Licensing of Activities Involving Animals) (England) (Amendment) Regulations 2019 as in force today (including any amendments) within the United Kingdom, from legislation.gov.uk.

Lucy's Law is a regulation which limits the sale of puppies and kittens as pets in England. The Lucy's Law campaign was launched by Lisa Cameron who was the chairperson of the All-Party Parliamentary Dog Advisory Welfare Group (APDAWG).

It is named after a spaniel called Lucy who was used for breeding on a puppy farm in South Wales from where she was taken in 2013 by an animal rescue organisation. Lucy had many ailments but was adopted by Lisa Garner who campaigned with vet Marc Abraham to prevent further maltreatment of such dogs.

To address this issue, an amendment to the existing licensing regulations was passed into law in May 2019 by Michael Gove. The instrument was the Animal Welfare (Licensing of Activities Involving Animals) (England) (Amendment) Regulations 2019 (SI 2019/2093). The law came into effect in April 2020, with licensed commercial traders no longer allowed to sell kittens or puppies as pets if they were less than six months old and they had not been bred by the seller.

Even though Lucy had been maltreated in Wales, where there were many puppy farms, the regulations only applied to England. This was because animal welfare regulations were devolved to the National Assembly for Wales.
