= Right of initiative (legislative) =

Constitutional power to propose a new law

The right of (legislative) initiative is the constitutionally defined power to propose a new law (bill) in a legislature.

The right of initiative is usually given to both the government (executive) and individual legislators.

However, some systems may restrict this right to legislators acting alone or with others (such as in the United States) or to the government (such as in the European Union). This, however, does not preclude the executive from suggesting the introduction of certain laws to their backers in the legislature, or even from members of the executive from introducing laws by themselves in systems that allow simultaneous membership in the executive and the legislature.

Bicameral legislatures may restrict or have the right of initiative restricted to the members of the lower house only, or allow members of the upper house to introduce bills to the lower house (such as in the Czech Republic).

== Groups with a right of initiative ==
Almost all countries give the right of legislative initiative to members of parliament, either as individuals or as part of a group. Depending on the country, other groups of people may have the ability to initiate legislation. These include the following:

- Heads of state, such as a president or a monarch
- Heads of government that are not also the head of state, such as a prime minister
- A cabinet as a whole, or an individual government minister
- Political parties
- Courts and government agencies
- Local governments, normally present in a federal system
- Academic institutions
- Businesses and companies
- Groups of citizens, normally with a signature quota
- Individual citizens

== Netherlands ==
The power to make a legislative proposal in the Netherlands is held by the members of the Dutch government and other members of the House of Representatives. Both have the right of initiative. The right of initiative is regulated in the Dutch Constitution:

Article 82 paragraph 1: Bills can be submitted by or on behalf of the King and the House of Representatives of the States General.

The Senate has no right of initiative as an independent body. There is, however, a right of initiative for the joint meeting of the States General (House and Senate together).

The right of initiative of the Crown and the States General had already been formulated in Article 46 of the Constitution for the United Netherlands of 1814:

Article 46. The Sovereign Prince has the right to propose laws and other proposals to the States General, as well as to approve or not approve the nominations made by the States General to Him. (...)

In more than 95% of all cases, the government takes the lead in drafting a law. A member of the House of Representatives can receive assistance from the Legislation Bureau. MPs will make more frequent use of their right of amendment, or the right to propose amendments to a bill.

== Belgium ==
In Belgium, the executive (officially the king and his ministers, but the king has no actual power) as well as members of the Senate and the Chamber of Representatives have the right of initiative. The executive must always exercise its right of initiative in the House (according to Belgian separation of powers, the executive also has the right of initiative).

If the Senate or the House exercises its right of initiative, it is referred to as a law proposal (wetsvoorstel in Dutch, proposition de loi in French). If the executive does so, this is referred to as a law project (wetsontwerp in Dutch, projet de loi in French). If the executive submits a bill, it must be sent to the Legislation Department of the Council of State for advice. This is a substantial requirement of form, i.e. non-compliance can lead to the annulment of the law.

== France ==
In France, ministerial bills are called law projects and parliament's bills are called law proposals.

=== Law projects ===
In France, bills are proposed by the government. One of the ministers propose the bill to those concerned by his or her application. Then, if the different ministers agree, the bill is sent to the secrétariat général du gouvernement and then to the Conseil d'État, the Council of Ministers, Parliament, and so on... The Conseil d'État (and sometimes the Constitutional Council) has the duty to advise the government on projects of law.

=== Law proposals ===
Any MP can propose a law to Parliament. Law proposals, unlike law projects, can be directly deposed if they do not increase the state's expenditure.

Both kind of bills can first be deposed either to the Senate or the National Assembly

Only 10% of laws that are passed are proposed by Members of Parliament. This is mainly because the government has several means to limit the power of Parliament: the Government fixes most of the agenda of both chambers, and the Government can, under certain conditions, prevent Parliament from modifying its texts.

The legislative initiative of Parliament has both good and bad points. The principal criticism is that lobbies could persuade Parliament to satisfy them before other citizens. On the other hand, legislative initiative is the best way for Parliament to defend itself against possible encroachments to its power.

== European Union ==
The European Commission has a near monopoly for legislative initiative, whereas in many parliamentary systems there is a mechanism whereby members of the parliament may introduce bills. This ranges from insignificant in the UK Parliament (see private members' bills in the Parliament of the United Kingdom), through quite significant in the Israeli Knesset, to being the only way bills can be introduced in the US Congress. In most parliaments, the ability of members to introduce legislation is common practice because parliament and government are constructed as antagonist under the system of separation of powers. Under the Treaty of Maastricht enhanced by the Lisbon Treaty, the European Parliament has an indirect right of legislative initiative that allows it to ask the Commission to submit a proposal, though to reject the request the Commission only needs to "inform the European Parliament of the reasons". Member states also have an indirect right of legislative initiative concerning the Common Foreign and Security Policy.

Over 80% of all proposals by the Commission were initially requested by other bodies.

Some politicians, including Jean-Pierre Chevènement and Dominique Strauss-Kahn, feel that the Commission's monopoly on legislative initiative prevents the emergence or development of real democratic debate.

Citizens also have legislative initiative in the EU by the procedure of a European Citizens' Initiative, in which at least a million signatures by EU citizens need to be obtained in at least a quarter of EU member states.

== United States ==
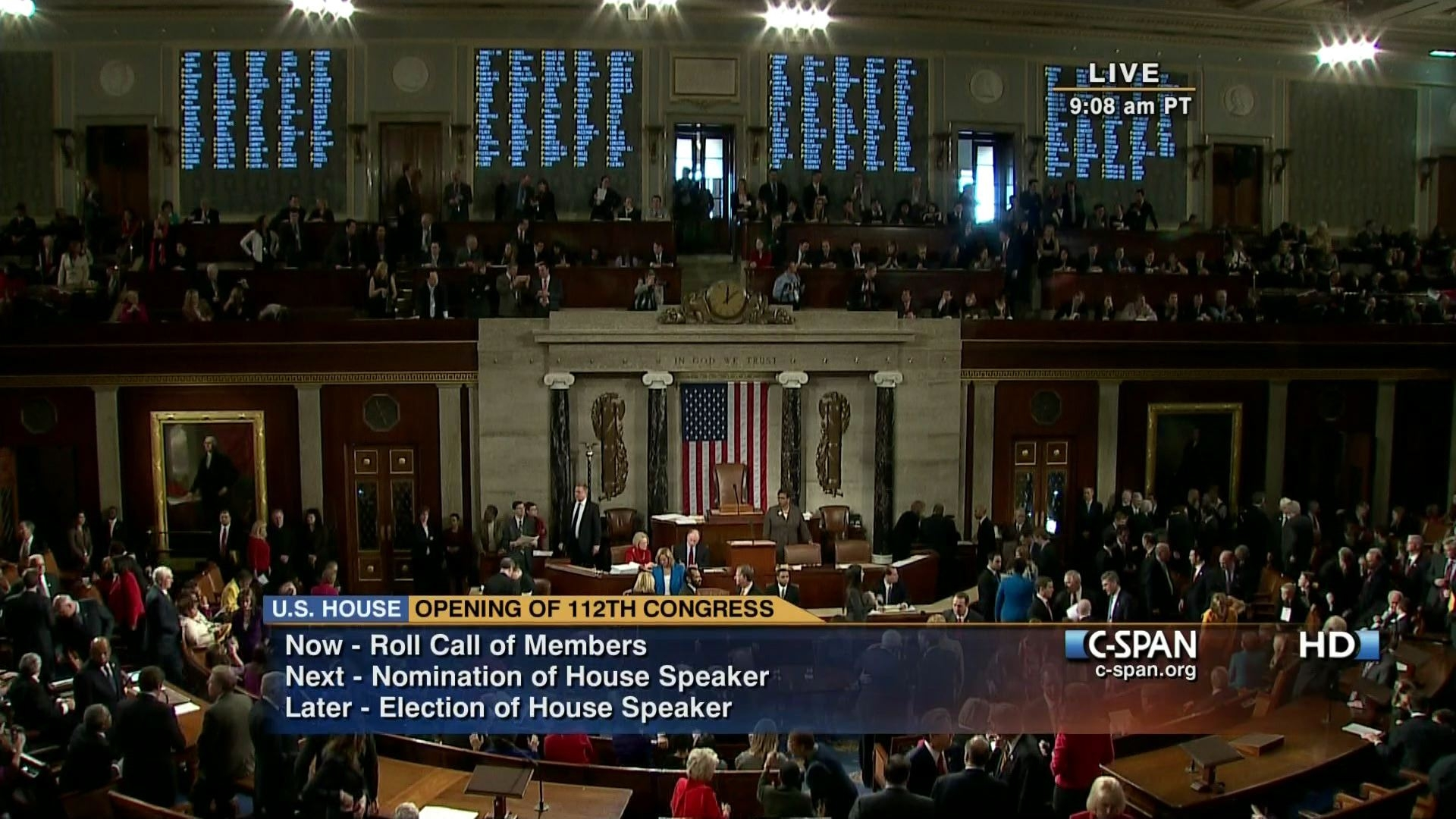
Opening of the 112th Congress in the House of Representatives chamber, January 5, 2011

All legislative Powers herein granted shall be vested in a Congress of the United States, which shall consist of a Senate and House of Representatives.

Section 1 is a vesting clause that bestows federal legislative power exclusively to Congress. Similar clauses are found in Article II, which confers executive power upon the president alone, and Article III, which grants judicial power solely to the federal judiciary. These three articles create a separation of powers among the three branches of the federal government. This separation of powers, by which each branch may exercise only its own constitutional powers and no others, is fundamental to the idea of a limited government accountable to the people.

The separation of powers principle is particularly significant for Congress. The Constitution declares that the Congress may exercise only those legislative powers "herein granted" within Article I (as later limited by the Tenth Amendment). It also, by implied extension, prohibits Congress from delegating its legislative authority to either of the other branches of government, a rule known as the nondelegation doctrine. However, the Supreme Court has ruled that Congress does have the latitude to delegate regulatory powers to executive agencies as long as it provides an "intelligible principle" which governs the agency's exercise of the delegated regulatory authority. That the power assigned to each branch must remain with that branch, and may be expressed only by that branch, is central to the theory. The nondelegation doctrine is primarily used as a way of interpreting a congressional delegation of authority narrowly, in that the courts presume Congress intended only to delegate that which it certainly could have, unless it clearly demonstrates it intended to "test the waters" of what the courts would allow it to do.

Although not mentioned in the Constitution, Congress has also long asserted the power to investigate and the power to compel cooperation with an investigation. The Supreme Court has affirmed these powers as an implication of Congress's power to legislate. Since the power to investigate is an aspect of Congress's power to legislate, it is as broad as Congress's powers to legislate. However, it is also limited to inquiries that are "in aid of the legislative function"; Congress may not "expose for the sake of exposure". It is uncontroversial that a proper subject of Congress's investigation power is the operations of the federal government, but Congress's ability to compel the submission of documents or testimony from the president or his subordinates is often-discussed and sometimes controversial (see executive privilege), although not often litigated. As a practical matter, the limitation of Congress's ability to investigate only for a proper purpose ("in aid of" its legislative powers) functions as a limit on Congress's ability to investigate the private affairs of individual citizens; matters that simply demand action by another branch of government, without implicating an issue of public policy necessitating legislation by Congress, must be left to those branches due to the doctrine of separation of powers. The courts are highly deferential to Congress's exercise of its investigation powers, however. Congress has the power to investigate that which it could regulate, and the courts have interpreted Congress's regulatory powers broadly since the Great Depression.

== See also ==
- Article One of the United States Constitution
- Constitution of the Republic of China
- Legislature
