= Booth, Texas =

- Unincorporated community
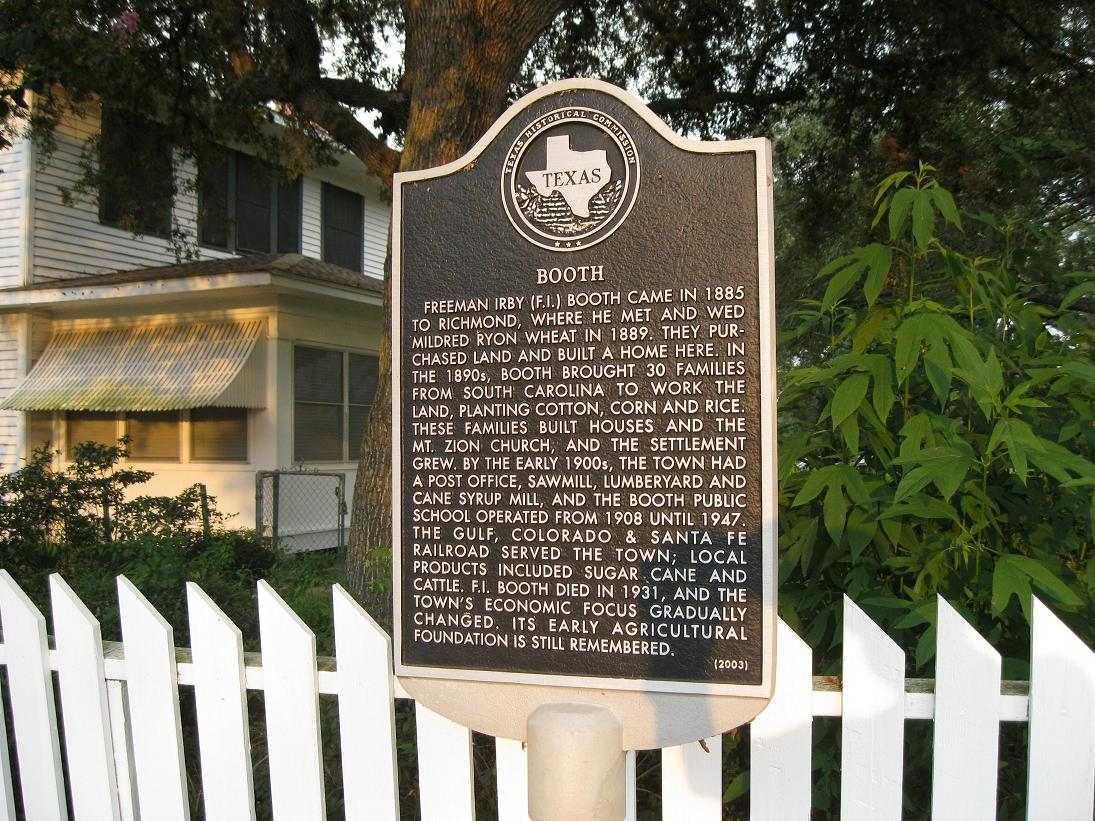
- Historical marker in Booth

- Location within Texas Location within the United States
- Coordinates: 29°31′48″N 95°39′00″W
- Country: United States
- State: Texas
- County: Fort Bend
- Elevation: 75 ft (23 m)
- Time zone: UTC-6 (Central (CST))
  - Summer (DST): UTC-5 (CDT)
- ZIP code: 77469
- Area code: 281

Booth is a small unincorporated community in Fort Bend County, Texas, United States. According to the Handbook of Texas, the community had a population of 60 in 1990. It is located within the Greater Houston metropolitan area.

== History ==
The property on which today's community stands was granted to Henry Jones (1789–1861) in Stephen F. Austin's Texas colony. Freeman Irby Booth, a wealthy landowner who owned a cotton gin, general store, lumberyard, and syrup mill, founded the settlement in the 1890s. The community received a post office in 1894. Two years later there was a Baptist church and 150 residents. By 1914, a population of about 300 was served by a bank and telephone connections. From the mid-1920s through 1948, about 100 people lived in the settlement. During the 1940s, Booth had two churches, a cemetery, and several scattered houses, but by the end of the decade, there were only 40 persons living there. In the 1980s there were two businesses and several scattered homes, and by 1990, there were about 60 residents.

Irby Booth traveled to South Carolina and invited 30 families from that state to settle here in the 1890s. The community was a shipping port for cotton, corn, and rice along the Brazos River. In the early 1900s, Booth had a syrup mill and a sawmill. It was also a shipping point for sugarcane, alfalfa, and vegetables along the Gulf, Colorado and Santa Fe Railway.

== Geography ==
Booth is located along Farm to Market Road 2759 and the Atchison, Topeka and Santa Fe Railway, 8 mi (13 km) southeast of Richmond in eastern Fort Bend County.

== Education ==
Booth had its own school in 1896. In 1926, it had two schools for 85 White and 177 Black students. The school continued to operate in the 1940s.

Today, Booth is zoned to schools in the Lamar Consolidated Independent School District. The schools include William C. Velazquez Elementary School, Reading Junior High School, and George Ranch High School.

== Notable person ==
- Senfronia Thompson, legislator for the Texas House of Representatives, was born in the community.

== Gallery ==
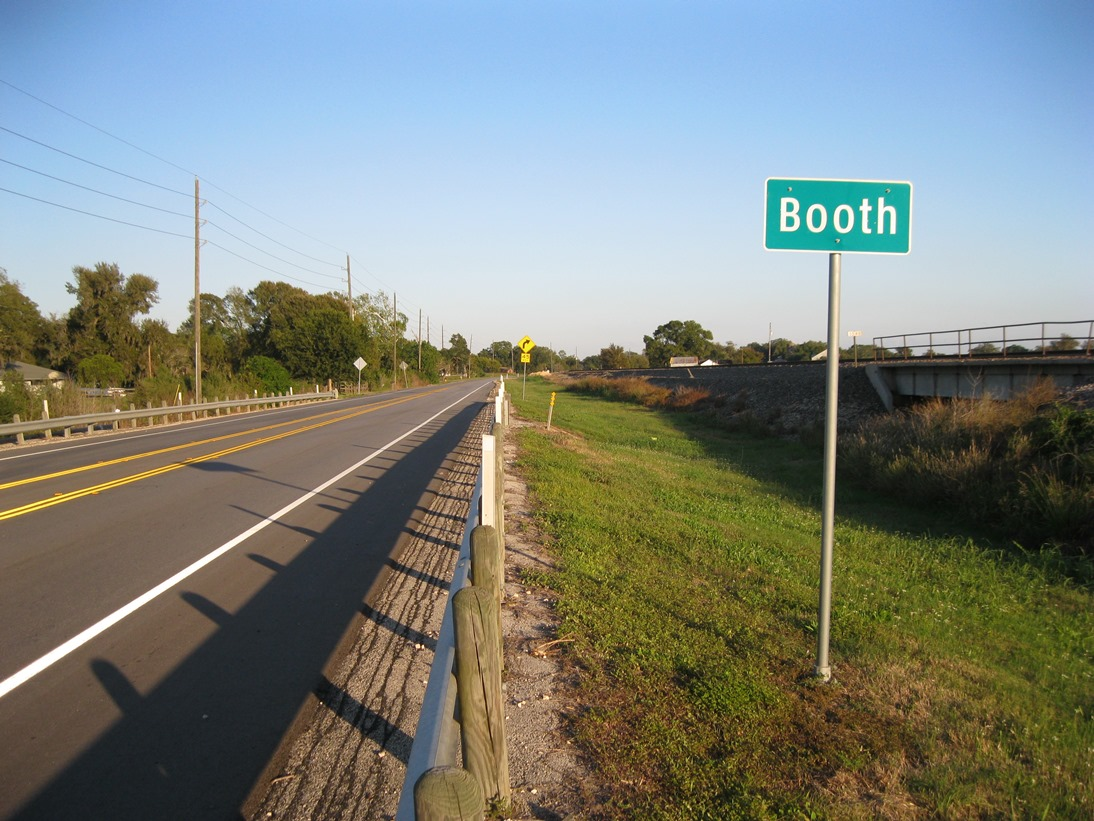
View east on FM 2759 showing Booth sign

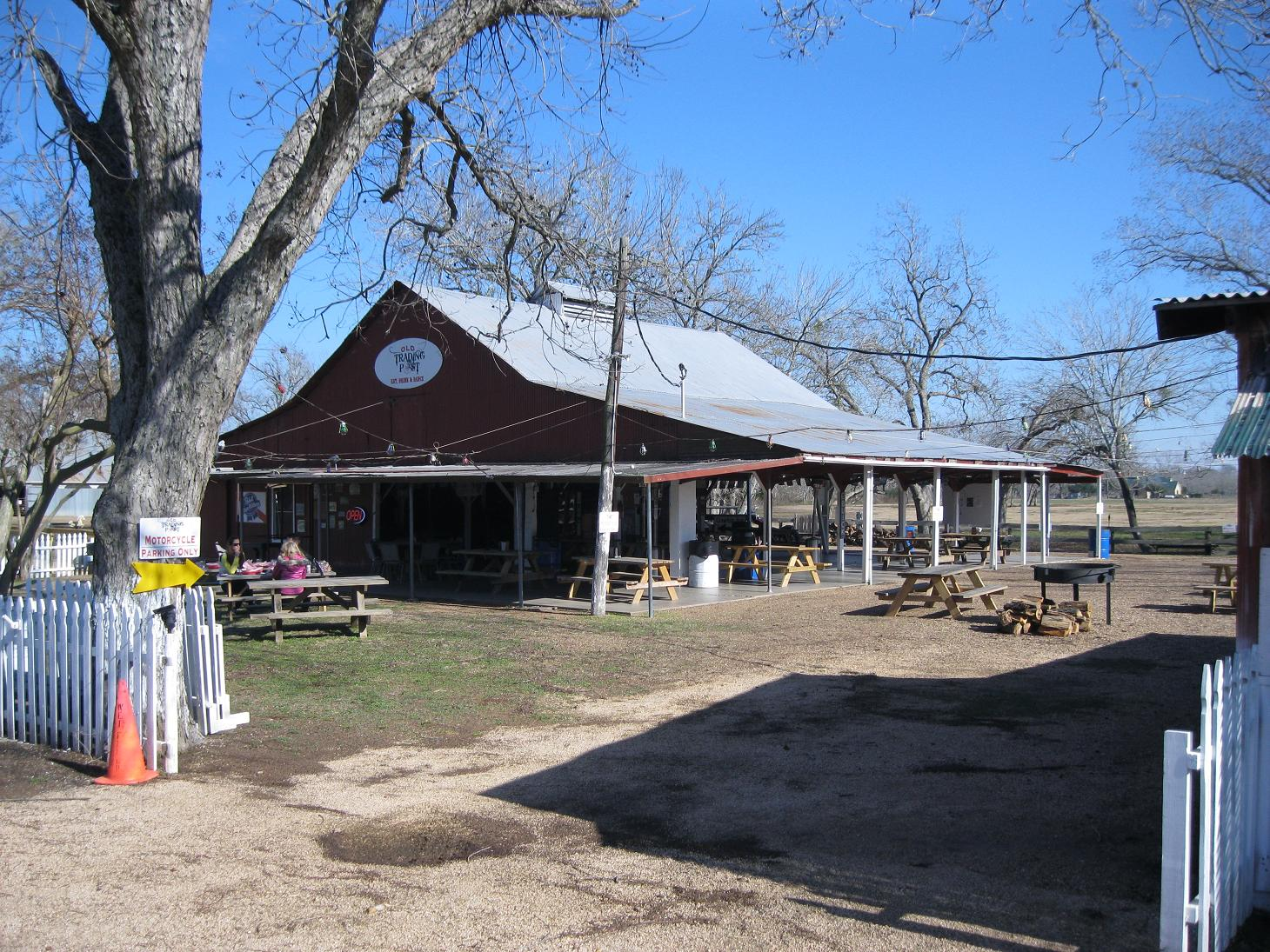
Old Trading Post on Agnes Road

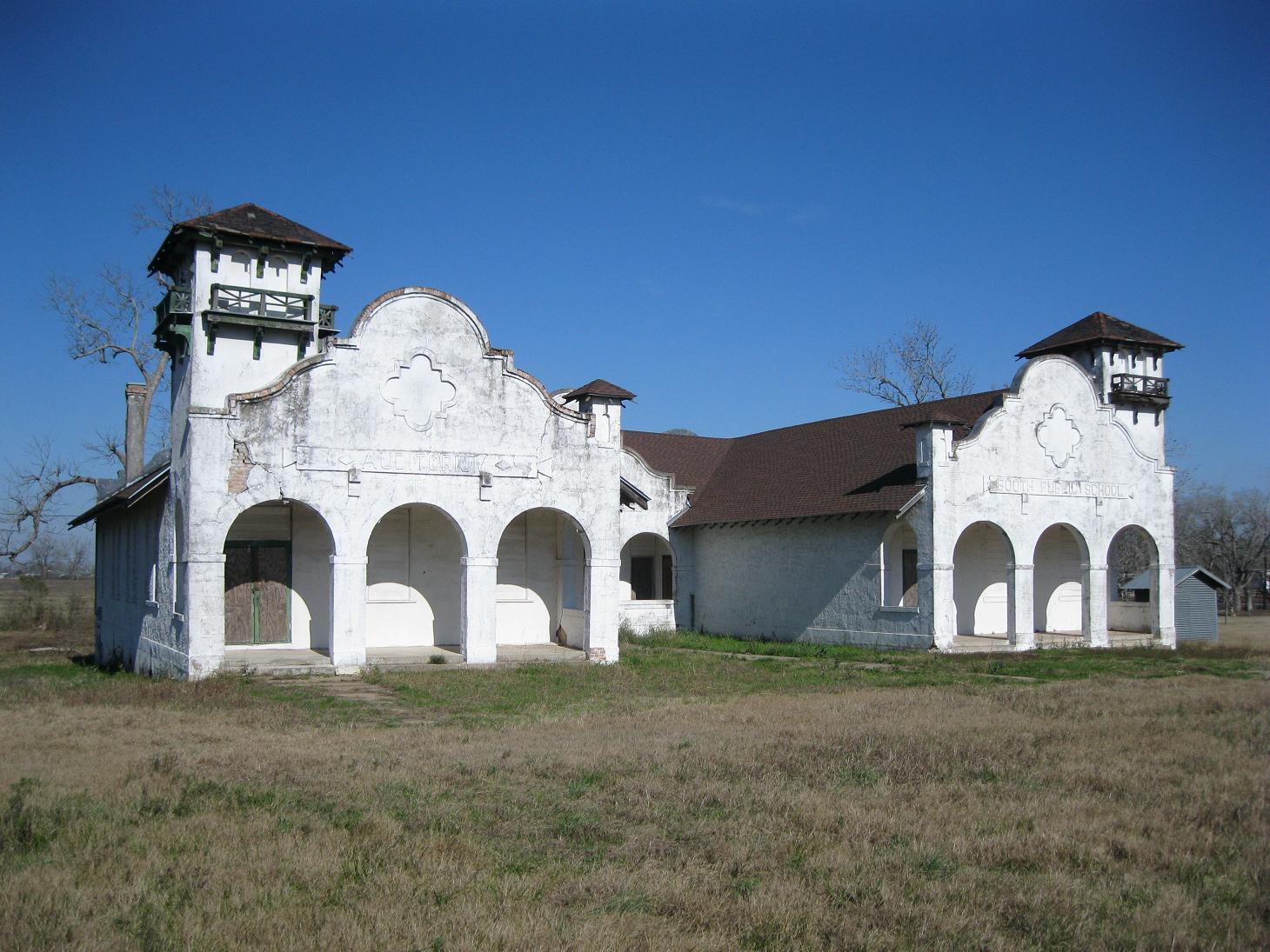
Abandoned schoolhouse in Booth

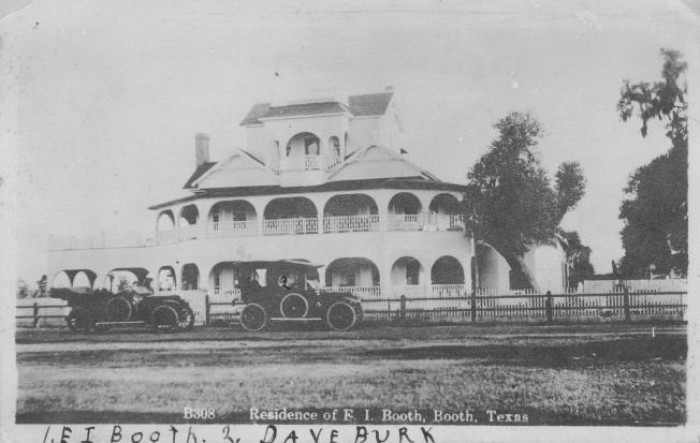
Residence of F.I. Booth on 1911 postcard

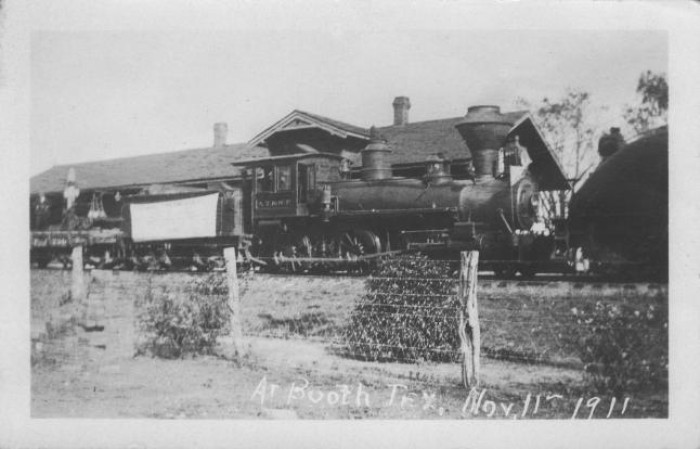
Train and station at Booth in 1911 postcard
