= List of acts of the Parliament of the United Kingdom from 2018 =

This is a list of acts of the Parliament of the United Kingdom passed in 2018.

Acts passed since 1963 are cited by calendar year, as opposed to the convention used for earlier acts of citing the regnal year(s) in which the relevant parliamentary session was held. Each act passed in a respective year is given a chapter number (abbreviated "c."), denoted by Arabic numerals in the case of public general acts, lowercase Roman numerals in the case of local acts, or italicised Arabic numerals in the case of personal acts. These run as separate series.

37 acts of Parliament were passed in 2018: 34 public general acts and 3 local acts.

indicates that an act has been transcribed on Wikisource, indicates that an act is available to view at legislation.gov.uk, and indicates the location of the original act in the Parliamentary Archives.

== Public general acts ==
Short title	Citation	Royal assent
Long title
Telecommunications Infrastructure (Relief from Non-Domestic Rates) Act 2018 (repealed)	2018 c. 1	8 February 2018
An Act to make provision enabling relief from non-domestic rates in England and Wales to be conferred in respect of hereditaments used for the purposes of facilitating the transmission of communications by any means involving the use of electrical or electromagnetic energy; and for connected purposes. (Repealed by Non-Domestic Rating Act 2023 (c. 53))
Armed Forces (Flexible Working) Act 2018	2018 c. 2	8 February 2018
An Act to make provision for members of the regular forces to serve part-time or subject to geographic restrictions.
Finance Act 2018	2018 c. 3	15 March 2018
An Act to grant certain duties, to alter other duties, and to amend the law relating to the national debt and the public revenue, and to make further provision in connection with finance.
Supply and Appropriation (Anticipation and Adjustments) Act 2018	2018 c. 4	15 March 2018
An Act to authorise the use of resources for the years ending with 31 March 2017, 31 March 2018 and 31 March 2019; to authorise the issue of sums out of the Consolidated Fund for the years ending 31 March 2018 and 31 March 2019; and to appropriate the supply authorised by this Act for the years ending with 31 March 2017 and 31 March 2018.
Space Industry Act 2018	2018 c. 5	15 March 2018
An Act to make provision about space activities and sub-orbital activities, and for connected purposes.
Northern Ireland (Regional Rates and Energy) Act 2018	2018 c. 6	28 March 2018
An Act to make provision about the regional rate in Northern Ireland for the year ending 31 March 2019; and amend the Renewable Heat Incentive Scheme Regulations (Northern Ireland) 2012. (Note: Renewable Heat Incentive Scheme Regulations (Northern Ireland) 2012 (SR(NI) 2012/396))
Northern Ireland Assembly Members (Pay) Act 2018 (repealed)	2018 c. 7	28 March 2018
An Act to confer power on the Secretary of State to determine salaries and other benefits for Members of the Northern Ireland Assembly in respect of periods when there is no Executive. (Repealed by Northern Ireland (Executive Formation etc) Act 2022 (c. 48))
Northern Ireland Budget (Anticipation and Adjustments) Act 2018 (repealed)	2018 c. 8	28 March 2018
An Act to authorise the issue out of the Consolidated Fund of Northern Ireland of certain sums for the service of the years ending 31 March 2018 and 2019; to appropriate those sums for specified purposes; to authorise the use for the public service of certain resources for those years; to revise the limits on the use of certain accruing resources in the year ending 31 March 2018; and to authorise the Department of Finance in Northern Ireland to borrow on the credit of the sum appropriated for the year ending 31 March 2019. (Repealed by Budget (No. 2) Act (Northern Ireland) 2021 (c. 5 (N.I.)))
Laser Misuse (Vehicles) Act 2018	2018 c. 9	10 May 2018
An Act to make provision creating new offences of shining or directing a laser beam towards a vehicle or air traffic facility; and for connected purposes.
Financial Guidance and Claims Act 2018	2018 c. 10	10 May 2018
An Act to make provision establishing a new financial guidance body (including provision about a debt respite scheme); to make provision about the funding of debt advice in Scotland, Wales and Northern Ireland; to provide a power to make regulations prohibiting unsolicited direct marketing in relation to pensions and other consumer financial products and services; and to make provision about the regulation of claims management services.
Secure Tenancies (Victims of Domestic Abuse) Act 2018	2018 c. 11	10 May 2018
An Act to make provision about the granting of old-style secure tenancies in cases of domestic abuse.
Data Protection Act 2018	2018 c. 12	23 May 2018
An Act to make provision for the regulation of the processing of information relating to individuals; to make provision in connection with the Information Commissioner's functions under certain regulations relating to information; to make provision for a direct marketing code of practice; and for connected purposes.
Sanctions and Anti-Money Laundering Act 2018	2018 c. 13	23 May 2018
An Act to make provision enabling sanctions to be imposed where appropriate for the purposes of compliance with United Nations obligations or other international obligations or for the purposes of furthering the prevention of terrorism or for the purposes of national security or international peace and security or for the purposes of furthering foreign policy objectives; to make provision for the purposes of the detection, investigation and prevention of money laundering and terrorist financing and for the purposes of implementing Standards published by the Financial Action Task Force relating to combating threats to the integrity of the international financial system; and for connected purposes.
Smart Meters Act 2018	2018 c. 14	23 May 2018
An Act to extend the period for the Secretary of State to exercise powers relating to smart metering; to provide for a special administration regime for a smart meter communication licensee; and to make provision enabling half-hourly electricity imbalances to be calculated using information obtained from smart meters.
Nuclear Safeguards Act 2018	2018 c. 15	26 June 2018
An Act to make provision about nuclear safeguards; and for connected purposes.
European Union (Withdrawal) Act 2018	2018 c. 16	26 June 2018
An Act to repeal the European Communities Act 1972 (Note: European Communities Act 1972 (c. 68)) and make other provision in connection with the withdrawal of the United Kingdom from the EU.
Supply and Appropriation (Main Estimates) Act 2018	2018 c. 17	19 July 2018
An Act to authorise the use of resources for the year ending with 31 March 2019; to authorise both the issue of sums out of the Consolidated Fund and the application of income for that year; and to appropriate the supply authorised for that year by this Act and by the Supply and Appropriation (Anticipation and Adjustments) Act 2018. (Note: Supply and Appropriation (Anticipation and Adjustments) Act 2018 (c. 4))
Automated and Electric Vehicles Act 2018	2018 c. 18	19 July 2018
An Act to make provision about automated vehicles and electric vehicles.
Haulage Permits and Trailer Registration Act 2018	2018 c. 19	19 July 2018
An Act to make provision about the international transport of goods by road; to make provision about the registration of trailers; and for connected purposes.
Northern Ireland Budget Act 2018 (repealed)	2018 c. 20	19 July 2018
An Act to authorise the issue out of the Consolidated Fund of Northern Ireland of certain sums for the service of the year ending 31 March 2019; to appropriate those sums for specified purposes; to authorise the Department of Finance in Northern Ireland to borrow on the credit of the appropriated sums; to authorise the use for the public service of certain resources (including accruing resources) for the year ending 31 March 2019; and to repeal certain spent provisions. (Repealed by Budget (No. 2) Act (Northern Ireland) 2021 (c. 5 (N.I.)))
Domestic Gas and Electricity (Tariff Cap) Act 2018	2018 c. 21	19 July 2018
An Act to make provision for the imposition of a cap on rates charged to domestic customers for the supply of gas and electricity; and for connected purposes.
Taxation (Cross-border Trade) Act 2018	2018 c. 22	13 September 2018
An Act to impose and regulate a duty of customs by reference to the importation of goods into the United Kingdom; to confer a power to impose and regulate a duty of customs by reference to the export of goods from the United Kingdom; to make other provision in relation to any duty of customs in connection with the withdrawal of the United Kingdom from the EU; to amend the law relating to value added tax, and the law relating to any excise duty on goods, in connection with that withdrawal; and for connected purposes.
Assaults on Emergency Workers (Offences) Act 2018	2018 c. 23	13 September 2018
An Act to make provision about offences when perpetrated against emergency workers, and persons assisting such workers; to make certain offences aggravated when perpetrated against such workers in the exercise of their duty; and for connected purposes.
Parental Bereavement (Leave and Pay) Act 2018	2018 c. 24	13 September 2018
An Act to make provision about leave and pay for employees whose children have died.
Rating (Property in Common Occupation) and Council Tax (Empty Dwellings) Act 2018	2018 c. 25	1 November 2018
An Act to make provision, where two or more hereditaments occupied or owned by the same person meet certain conditions as to contiguity, for those hereditaments to be treated for the purposes of non-domestic rating as one hereditament; and to increase the percentage by which a billing authority in England may increase the council tax payable in respect of a long-term empty dwelling.
Non-Domestic Rating (Nursery Grounds) Act 2018	2018 c. 26	1 November 2018
An Act to make provision for buildings used as nursery grounds to be exempt from non-domestic rates in England and Wales.
Mental Health Units (Use of Force) Act 2018	2018 c. 27	1 November 2018
An Act to make provision about the oversight and management of the appropriate use of force in relation to people in mental health units; to make provision about the use of body cameras by police officers in the course of duties in relation to people in mental health units; and for connected purposes.
Northern Ireland (Executive Formation and Exercise of Functions) Act 2018 (repealed)	2018 c. 28	1 November 2018
An Act to facilitate the formation of an Executive in Northern Ireland by extending the time for making Ministerial appointments following the election of the Northern Ireland Assembly on 2 March 2017; and to make provision about the exercise of governmental functions in, or in relation to, Northern Ireland in the absence of Northern Ireland Ministers. (Repealed by Northern Ireland (Ministers, Elections and Petitions of Concern) Act 2022 (c. 2))
Civil Liability Act 2018	2018 c. 29	20 December 2018
An Act to make provision about whiplash claims and the personal injury discount rate.
Ivory Act 2018	2018 c. 30	20 December 2018
An Act to prohibit dealing in ivory, and for connected purposes.
Health and Social Care (National Data Guardian) Act 2018	2018 c. 31	20 December 2018
An Act to establish, and make provision about, the National Data Guardian for Health and Social Care; and for connected purposes.
Prisons (Interference with Wireless Telegraphy) Act 2018	2018 c. 32	20 December 2018
An Act to make provision about interference with wireless telegraphy in prisons and similar institutions.
Courts and Tribunals (Judiciary and Functions of Staff) Act 2018	2018 c. 33	20 December 2018
An Act to make provision about the judiciary and the functions of the staff of courts and tribunals.
Homes (Fitness for Human Habitation) Act 2018	2018 c. 34	20 December 2018
An Act to amend the Landlord and Tenant Act 1985 (Note: Landlord and Tenant Act 1985 (c. 70)) to require that residential rented accommodation is provided and maintained in a state of fitness for human habitation; and for connected purposes.

== Local acts ==
Short title	Citation	Royal assent
Long title
City of London Corporation (Open Spaces) Act 2018	2018 c. i	15 March 2018
An Act to make provision relating to the public open spaces under the management and control of the City of London Corporation; and for related purposes.
Middle Level Act 2018	2018 c. ii	1 November 2018
An Act to amend and update the powers of the Middle Level Commissioners to regulate navigation on the Middle Level of the Fens in the city of Peterborough and the counties of Cambridgeshire and Norfolk; to make further provision as to the regulation of navigation on those waterways; to make other provision as to the Commissioners; and for connected purposes.
University of London Act 2018	2018 c. iii	20 December 2018
An Act to make new provision for the making of statutes for the University of London; and for related purposes.

== See also ==
- List of acts of the Parliament of the United Kingdom
