= Texas puppy mill bill =

2011 animal welfare legislation

The Texas puppy mill bill, formally House Bill 1451: The Large-Scale Commercial Dog and Cat Breeder Bill, is a Texas state law that sets guidelines for the welfare of animals with large-scale commercial breeders. It was passed by the Texas state legislature in 2011 and took effect on September 1, 2012.

The law specifies parameters such as feed, space, shelter, ventilation and medical care. Although popularly known as the "puppy mill bill", it addresses all large-scale animal breeders, defined in the law as breeders who keep 11 or more breeding females or sell 20 or more offspring in a year. It does not regulate hobby breeders. It is administered by the Texas Department of Licensing and Regulation, who issued rules regarding the administration of the program.

The bill was written by Democratic state representative Senfronia Thompson. It was passed on June 17, 2011, and took effect on September 1, 2012. A motion was filed in Austin's federal district court by three breeders and the Responsible Pet Owners Alliance (RPOA), which represents 305 American Kennel Club groups in Texas, seeking to have the bill struck down as unconstitutional. An amicus curiae was presented by the Texas Humane Legislation Network with support from the Humane Society of the United States, urging the court to uphold the bill. The bill was defended by the office of the Texas Attorney General. On January 31, 2013, federal district judge James R. Nowlin denied the motion and upheld the constitutional validity of the bill.

Alicia Graef, writing for Care2, described the ruling as a triumph for puppies over angry breeders. Opponents of the bill, such as members of RPOA, argued that the law would not alleviate the sufferings of badly treated animals but would create a "dog Gestapo".
