= Senfronia Thompson =

Texas politician

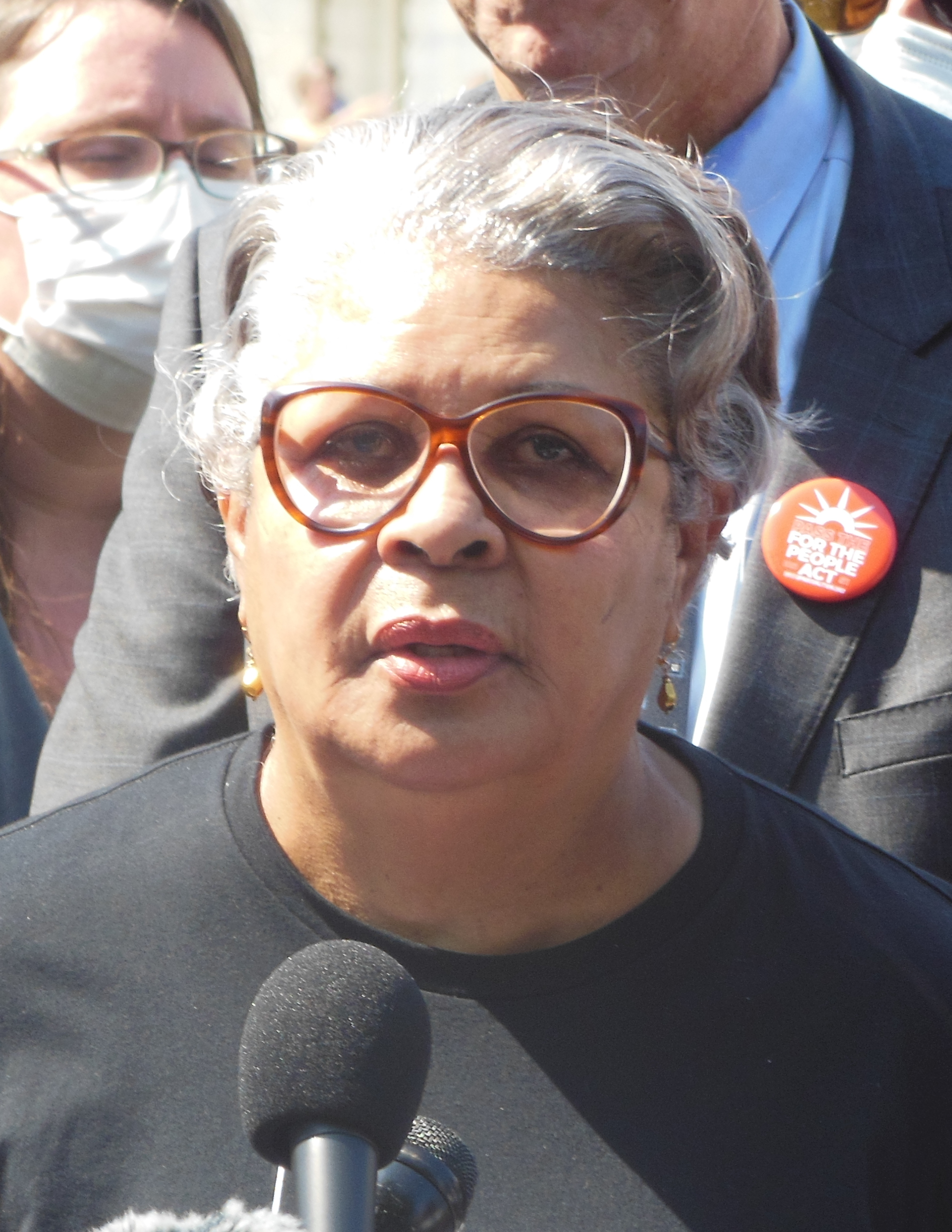
- Thompson in 2021

Member of the Texas House of Representatives
- Incumbent
- Assumed office January 11, 1983
- Preceded by: Constituency established
- Constituency: 141st district
- In office January 9, 1973 – January 11, 1983
- Preceded by: Gib Lewis
- Succeeded by: Homer Dear
- Constituency: 89th district

Personal details
- Born: January 1, 1939 (age 87) Booth, Texas, U.S.
- Party: Democratic
- Education: Texas Southern University (BS, MEd, JD); University of Houston (LLM)
- Website: State House website; Campaign website
- Nickname: Ms. T

Senfronia Paige Thompson (born January 1, 1939) is an American politician. A member of the Democratic Party, she has represented the 141st district in the Texas House of Representatives since 1983 and previously the 89th district since 1973. She is the dean of women legislators in Texas and is the longest-serving African American or female lawmaker in state history. She has been elected to 28 terms in office.

== Early life ==
Thompson was born in Booth, Texas, and raised in Houston. Her mother was a maid and she had grandparents who were sharecroppers. Thompson's great-grandmother ran a boarding house, and the independence it allowed her great-grandmother to have inspired Thompson as a child. She believed a career in dentistry would give her that independence, but Texas did not have any dental schools that admitted Black students. Thompson discussed moving to Tennessee to pursue a career in dentistry, but they decided to start a family and she changed paths to teaching special education in public schools. She has a Bachelor of Science in biology and a master's degree in education from Texas Southern University; a Juris Doctor from the Thurgood Marshall School of Law; and a Master of Law in international law from the University of Houston. Thompson worked as a volunteer for campaigns before deciding to go into politics.

== Texas House of Representatives ==
Thompson decided to enter politics after a new district was created that included her old neighborhood. Her husband was supportive, but Thompson thinks he was surprised when she was elected to the Texas House in 1972. She along with Eddie Bernice Johnson were the first two Black women to be elected to the legislature. Since 1983 she has represented House District 141, which covers northeast Houston and the Humble area.

During her freshman term in the legislature, Thompson attended a luncheon during which fellow state representative C.C. "Kit" Cooke greeted her by saying "Here comes my beautiful black mistress." Thompson went to the Speaker of the House, Price Daniel, Jr., to get permission to give a speech of personal privilege to rebuke the comments. When other members learned of her intention, they attempted to prevent her from giving the speech, insisting it was simply a joke and threatening that she would not be able to pass legislation if she spoke out. State representative Bob Davis called a point of order on her giving the speech saying it was not germane to her legislative duties. Speaker Daniel allowed Thompson to give the speech in which she said that she would "not tolerate racial or sexual insults whether they were delivered by a fool with no forethought or done in a vicious manner" and that if another incident of this kind were to happen she would be forced to "take matters into [her] own hands."

In 2001, Thompson authored the James Byrd Jr. Hate Crimes Act. She was one of fifty-five Texas House Democrats, known as the "Killer Ds," who left the state in 2003 for Ardmore, Oklahoma to break quorum and thwart Republican efforts to redistrict before the 2010 United States census. Her offices were searched as part of the effort to locate legislators and compel them to return to the Capitol. Thompson expressed frustration with the search to the Houston Chronicle: "Honey, they went all through my office, my desk and my file cabinets. Now why would they look for me there? You know I can’t get into my file cabinets, as big as I am." In 2005, Thompson opposed efforts to modify the Texas Constitution to prohibit same-sex marriage.

Thompson wrote House Bill 1451, the Texas puppy mill bill, which regulates large-scale animal breeders. It was passed by the legislature in 2011 and took effect on September 1, 2012. Opponents claimed it would create a "dog Gestapo" and filed a lawsuit to have the bill struck down as unconstitutional. On January 31, 2013, federal district judge James R. Nowlin denied the motion and upheld the constitutional validity of the bill.

In 2016 after being nominated for reelection in the primary, Thompson sought the Democratic nomination for the Texas Senate seat held by Rodney Ellis. Ellis had been nominated for reelection to the Senate, but had given up the seat to run for Harris County Commissioners Court Precinct 1. Thompson ran to replace Ellis on the November ballot. She received the second most nominating votes by precinct chairs, losing to fellow state representative Borris Miles.

In October 2020, she filed to run for Speaker of the Texas House of Representatives, but the Republican Party retained control of the chamber in the November 2020 election; Dade Phelan was ultimately elected speaker.

On May 30, 2021, she described her own family's struggles to exercise their right to vote to fellow Texas House Democrats as they strategized how to block Senate Bill 7. At 11:00 p.m., the Democrats staged a walkout of the House chamber to block a vote on the bill before the midnight deadline. Thompson was part of a contingent that traveled to Washington, D.C. Along with Diego Bernal and Nicole Collier, she testified before the civil rights and civil liberties subcommittee of the United States House Committee on Oversight and Government Reform about her concerns about how the proposed bill would harm her constituents.

Thompson worked with State Senator Angela Paxton in 2025 to crack down on human trafficking in massage parlors. In her tenure, Thompson has supported raising the minimum wage, restricting smoking in public areas, and requiring health insurance plans to cover contraceptives.

Since 2021, Thompson has held the title of Dean of the House, having served longer in the legislature than any other woman or Black American person in Texas history. She shares the title with Tom Craddick, who is the longest serving male representative.

== 2026 campaign for Speaker of the House ==
After Democrats won control of the Texas House in the 2026 election, Thompson announced her candidacy for speaker of the House during the upcoming 90th Texas Legislature. She was endorsed by many colleagues, including House Democratic Caucus Chair Gene Wu. At a press conference three days after the election, Thompson announced that she had enough pledged votes to win the election when the House convenes in January 2027. If elected, Thompson would be the first woman and first Black lawmaker to serve as the speaker of the Texas House of Representatives.

== Personal life ==
Thompson has two adult children, one grandson, one granddaughter and one great-granddaughter. Thompson is Catholic.

Thompson also advises the United Negro College Fund in Texas.

=== Honors ===
In 2001, Thompson was one named in the "Top 10 Legislators" by Texas Monthly.

The Center for Policy Alternatives named her as an Eleanor Roosevelt Fellow.

Thompson was inducted into the Texas Women's Hall of Fame in 2014.

The Texas Council on Family Relations presented her with the 2017 Family Champion Award.

On June 2, 2025, it was announced that a portrait of her likeness, painted by Kermit Oliver, would be put on display in the Texas Capitol in recognition of her service.
