= Ivory Act 2018 =

- Act of Parliament
- Parliament of the United Kingdom
- Long title: An Act to prohibit dealing in ivory, and for connected purposes.
- Citation: c. 30
- Introduced by: Michael Gove (Commons); Baron Gardiner of Kimble (Lords)

Dates
- Royal assent: 20 December 2018

Status: Current legislation

Text of statute as originally enacted

Text of the Ivory Act 2018 as in force today (including any amendments) within the United Kingdom, from legislation.gov.uk.

The Ivory Act 2018 (c. 30) is an Act of the Parliament of the United Kingdom that introduced a prohibition on dealing in items containing elephant ivory, with limited exemptions. The Act also established a new compliance regime for exempted items, and introduced civil and criminal penalties for those found guilty of breaching the ban.

The Ivory Bill was introduced to the House of Commons as a government bill by the Environment Secretary, Michael Gove, on 23 May 2018, and to the House of Lords by the Minister for Rural Affairs, Baron Gardiner of Kimble, on 5 July 2018. The bill was given royal assent on 20 December 2018.

In January 2025, the act was extended to ban trading in ivory of four other species: hippopotamuses, orcas, narwhals and sperm whales.

== Background ==
In September 2016, the British Government announced its intention to introduce a ban on the sale of all ‘worked’ ivory produced after 1947. Any works produced before 1947 would be classified as antiques, and trade in these goods would permitted. This was criticised as the Conservative Party manifesto for the 2015 general election pledged to introduce a total ban on the ivory trade. A petition was launched on the Parliament petitions website in response, gathering more than the 100,000 signatures required to force a debate in Parliament.

The Ivory Bill was introduced to the House of Commons as a Government bill by the Environment Secretary, Michael Gove, on 23 May 2018, and to the House of Lords by the Minister for Rural Affairs, Baron Gardiner of Kimble, on 5 July 2018. The bill was given royal assent on 20 December 2018.

== Act ==
=== Prohibition and exceptions ===
Section 1 of the act prohibits dealing in ivory. The Section came into force, thus commencing the ban, on 6 June 2022.

== Judicial review ==
A group of Antique dealers known as Friends of Antique Cultural Treasures (FACT), funded by the British Antique Dealers’ Association, challenged the ban in the High Court. The group were granted leave to appeal to the Court of Appeal.

On 18 May 2020, the Court of Appeal dismissed the appeal. The group were denied leave to appeal to the Supreme Court.

== Commentary ==
National Geographic described the ban as "one of the strictest in the world" and Reuters said that it was the "toughest ban on ivory in Europe".

== Extension to other species ==
In May 2023 it was announced that new legislation would extend the ban to the ivory of five other species: hippopotamuses, orcas, walruses, narwhals and sperm whales. This change came into force for hippopotamuses, orcas, narwhals and sperm whales in January 2025; in May 2024, it had been decided not to include walruses in the ban, as walrus ivory was covered by existing regulations on seal products.
