= Puppy mill =

Type of commercial dog breeding facility

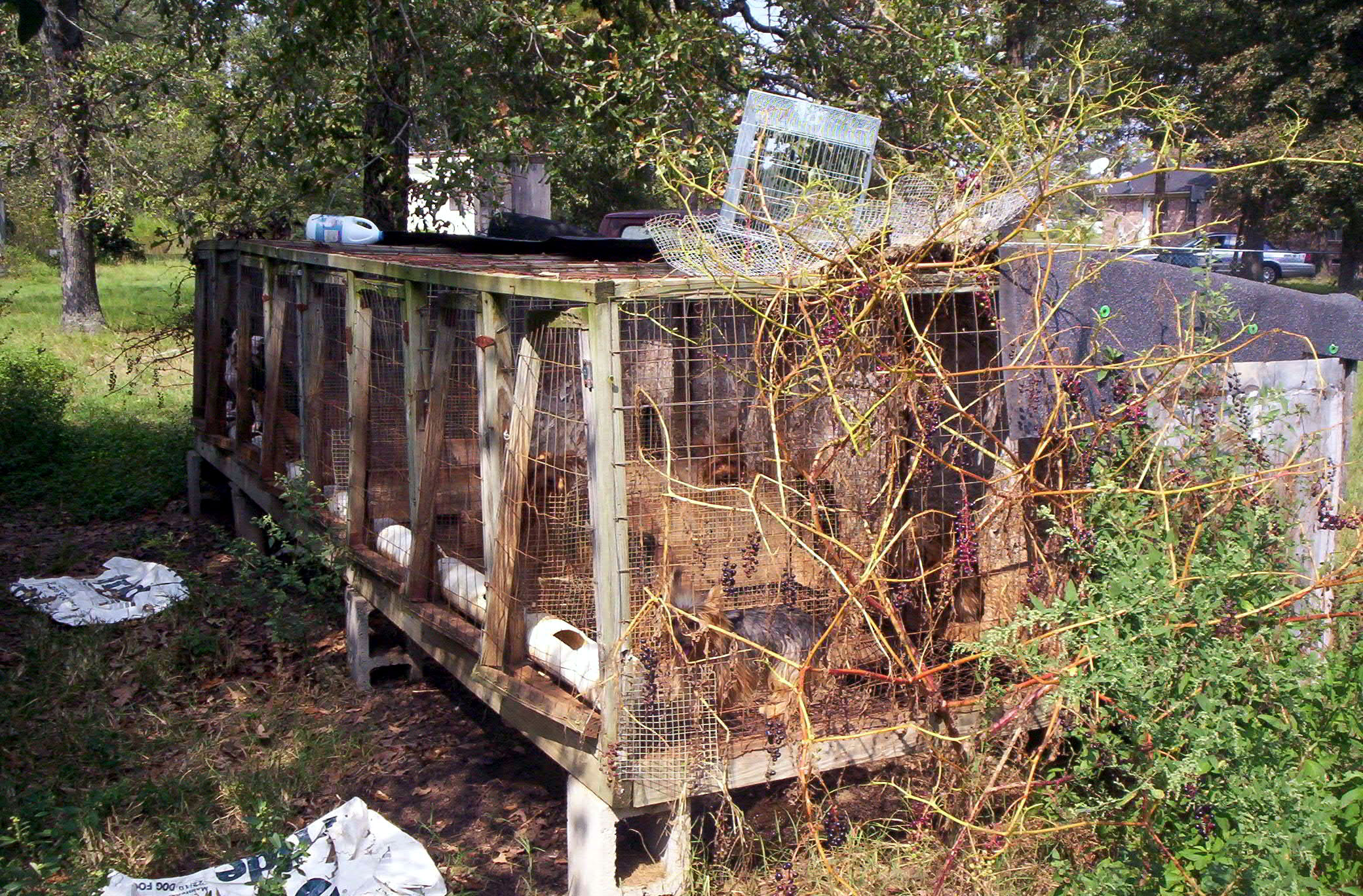
A puppy mill in the rural United States

A puppy mill, also known as a puppy farm, is a commercial dog breeding facility characterized by quick breeding and poor conditions. Although no standardized legal definition for "puppy mill" exists, a definition was established in Avenson v. Zegart in 1984 as "a dog breeding operation in which the health of the dogs is disregarded to maintain a low overhead and maximize profits". They are cited as being a result of increased demand for household pets, especially after World War II. The Veterinary Medical Association of the Humane Society of the United States defines the main characteristics of a puppy mill as "emphasis on quantity over quality, indiscriminate breeding, continuous confinement, lack of human contact and environmental enrichment, poor husbandry, and minimal to no veterinary care."

There are an estimated 10,000 licensed and unlicensed puppy mills in the United States, in total selling more than 2 million puppies annually. In these puppy mills, breeding dogs are often subjected to living the entirety of their lives in cages, which are cramped and uncomfortable for the dog. An estimated 500,000 dogs are kept solely for the purpose of breeding in puppy mills.

== Background ==
The socialization period in a puppy occurs between the ages of 4 weeks and up to 14 weeks of age. This period is crucial for adult development as almost all adult abilities are learned during this stage. With puppy mills essentially skipping the process of socialization, the result is often social problems when the puppy matures to adulthood.

== Conditions in puppy mills ==
The ASPCA states that some puppy mills can have up to 1,000 dogs under one roof. Because of the high volume of animals, the mill runner will often resort to housing them in wire cages. This results in the animals having poor locomotion. Keeping dogs in wire kennels can lead to injury and damage to the dogs' paws and legs. It's also fairly common for these kennels to be stacked on top of each other in columns. The conditions in these mills are so unsanitary that the animals are often coated in their own urine and feces, causing mats in their fur. Due to unsanitary conditions, puppies from mills will often have internal parasites, affecting their health. Puppy mills are often unheated and this increases the number of deaths due to cold among the dogs used for breeding. Conversely, the mills can also be too hot in warmer weather leading to hyperthermia.

Other common conditions in mills include malnutrition and untreated injuries.

Due to the frequently poor breeding conditions in puppy mills, puppies bred there often suffer from health and/or social problems. Puppy mill dogs are usually housed in a small, wire cages similar to rabbit hutches and chicken coops. Puppies raised in these cramped environments shared by many other dogs become poorly socialized to other dogs and to humans. Dogs are then transported over long distances in poor conditions, sometimes resulting in animal stress and death. As the surviving mill dogs grow older, they are more prone to developing respiratory ailments and pneumonia, as well as hereditary defects such as hip dysplasia. In addition, mill dogs are more prone to having problems with their temperament due to lack of socialization, enrichment, and positive human contact. Puppies from mills are usually sold as purebred dogs in an attempt to attract the higher prices associated with purebreds. However, due to the indiscriminate breeding practices of puppy mills, the dog may not actually be a purebred puppy. A high population of puppies from mills are inbred due to uncontrolled breeding. The vast majority of puppy mill animals are sold to pet stores by "dealers" or "brokers". Some puppies are sold by dealers masquerading as authentic breeders.

Puppy mills in the US often start with hundreds of female dogs which serve their entire lives in the establishment. The females are bred until they can no longer conceive puppies, and are often euthanized after that. The estimated number of puppies per breeding female per year is 9.4. In most puppy mills, the dogs live in cages that are only 15 centimetres (6 inches) larger than the dog on all sides, which is the minimum legal size allowed. Two million puppies are bred in mills each year and almost 1.2 million dogs are euthanized in shelters every year. The conditions in puppy mills are considered inhumane because all of the dogs are in a small, dirty area which is confined with disease and bacteria. Because of the poor living conditions, dogs are often sick and malnourished. Food is often found crawling with bugs and feces is almost everywhere. Health issues that are prevalent in puppy mills consist of giardia, mange, heartworm, respiratory infections, and much more.

== History ==
Puppy mills originated in the post-World War II era. Midwestern farmers, suffering crop failures, turned to puppy farming as an alternative crop. An increasing demand for household pets resulted in the development of the "commercial puppy business".

Conditions in puppy mills were well known to be poor. As a result, organizations such as the Humane Society of the United States began to investigate breeding kennels, leading to the passage of the Animal Welfare Act of August 24, 1966.

== Prevalence ==
=== United States ===
According to the Humane Society of the United States, only about 3,000 of the 10,000 puppy mills in the United States are closely monitored by the U.S. Department of Agriculture. This presents the possibility of significant noncompliance with federal law by owners and operators of mill operations. Puppy mills do not only affect the dogs that live in and come from them; purchases from pet stores and breeders lessen the number of adoptions from shelters, where several hundreds of thousands of dogs are euthanized every year.

A high concentration of both puppy mills and breeders has been reported in the states of Pennsylvania, Arkansas, Kansas, and Missouri. Pennsylvania, particularly Lancaster County, has been labeled the "Puppy Mill Capital of the East" due to its high volume of puppy mills, and Missouri has been labeled the "Puppy Mill Capital of the U.S." by animal welfare and consumer protection groups. In Lancaster County, Pennsylvania, and Holmes County, Ohio, the high concentration of puppy mills is correlated with a large Amish population.

A study by the Better Business Bureau concluded that the southwest corner of Missouri is the hub of the nation's puppy mill industry, and termed it the "national hot spot of the puppy industry." The state of Missouri has around 1,600 puppy mills as of 2018.

=== Australia ===
Dog breeding is regulated by individual Australian states. There is no available data on the prevalence of puppy farms.

In 2010, the RSPCA Australia identified 12 puppy farms in the state of Queensland and estimated a similar prevalence in other Australian states.

== Hobby breeders ==
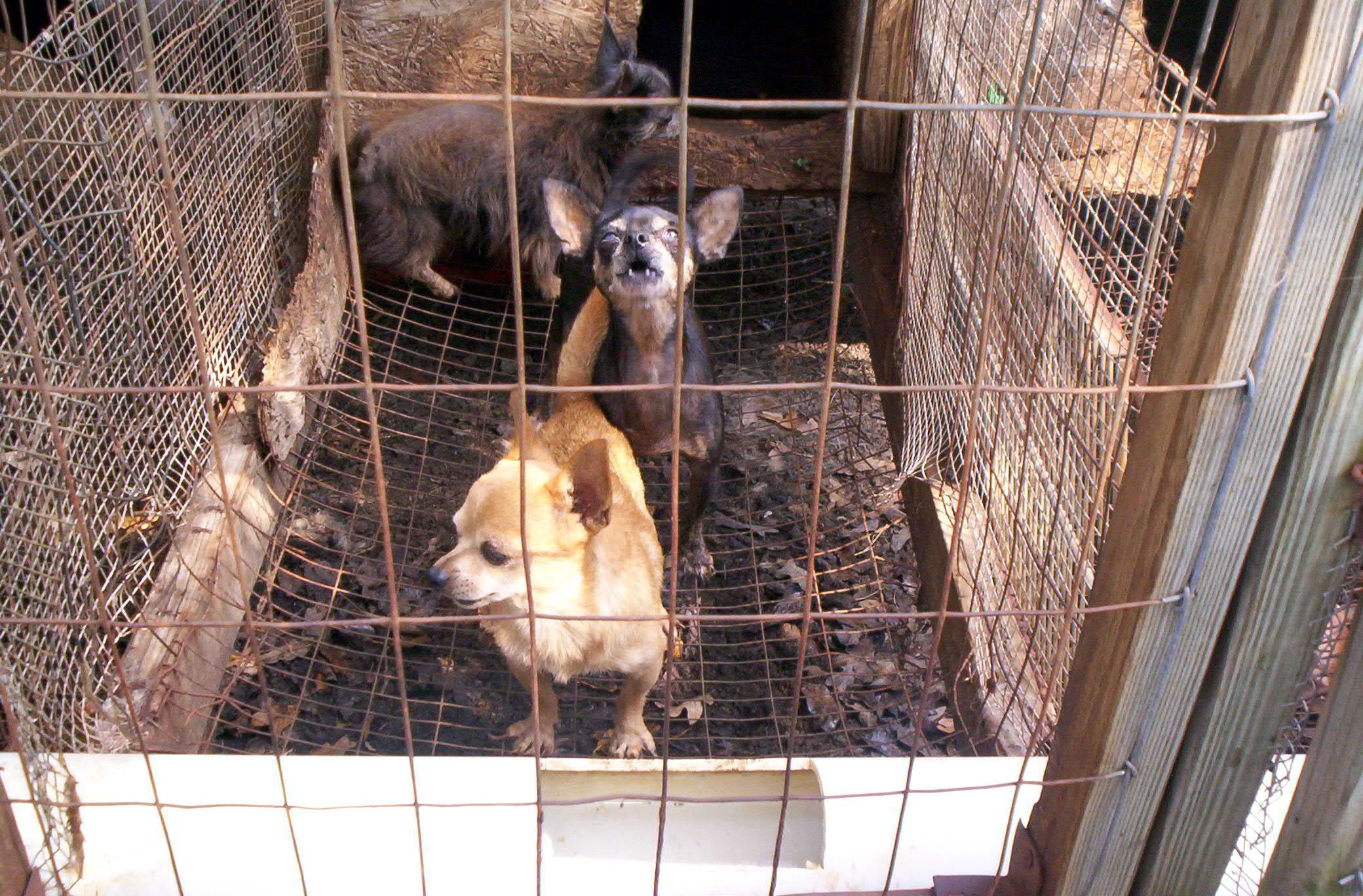
Miniature breeds at a US puppy mill

The term "puppy mill" has been widely used by animal rights groups in protests against breeders who have substandard breeding conditions. Critics in the breeder community claim that emotional rhetoric, sensationalism and pictures of dirty kennels are used to justify additional legislation or additional restrictive licensing that travels well beyond the initial goal of removing dogs from truly deplorable conditions, or that attempts to legislate puppy mills would put them out of business. They argue the laws requiring additional costs in updating and maintaining their facility and licensing would be detrimental to the dogs in their care. They cite existing lemon laws for puppies as sufficient protection for both dogs and prospective buyers.

== Legislative response ==
=== United States ===
In the United States, some elements of the dog breeding industry are regulated by the Animal Welfare Act of August 24, 1966.

In recent years, state legislatures have passed new laws aimed at eliminating the worst abuses at puppy mills. New laws include limits on the number of breeding females, requirements that facilities be licensed and inspected, and requirements that dogs be given proper veterinary care. Louisiana, Pennsylvania and Virginia passed puppy mill laws in 2008, and 10 states passed laws in 2009 to crack down on abusive puppy mills.

In 2010, Missouri voters passed Proposition B, the "Puppy Mill Cruelty Prevention Act", which establishes minimum standards of humane care and limits breeders to 50 intact dogs.

A compromise, dubbed the Missouri Solution, was signed by Missouri Governor Jay Nixon.

Gov. Jay Nixon, Missouri Attorney General Chris Koster, Missouri Director of Agriculture Jon Hagler and Humane Society of Missouri President Kathy Warnick in the St. Louis Post-Dispatch state that "key provisions of a compromise dog breeding law passed in April will protect animals without putting dog breeders out of business."

It retained some of the provisions of Proposition B, and made available some state funding for inspections. Humane Society of Missouri President Kathy Warnick reacted favorably, seeing a step in the right direction for animal welfare.

The Missouri Senate has a current bill SB 161 that "modifies provisions relating to agriculture." Section 273.327, under the Animal Care Facilities Act states how there will be fees for dog facilities every year. On the same bill section 273.347, it states that breeders can receive penalties for animal care violations up to $1,000 and receive a class C misdemeanor.

=== Australia ===
Sydney Lord Mayor Clover Moore has responded to the problem of puppy mills in Australia by proposing the Animals Regulation of Sale Bill. It would ban the sale of dogs through pet shops, the internet or newspapers. The aim is to crack down on impulse purchases and shut down unregistered backyard breeders. These breeders should no longer easily profit from the sale of the dogs and the number of unwanted and abandoned animals could drop.

Also recently there were a few bold initiatives to fight against puppy mills. Namely RSPCA (Royal Society for the Prevention of Cruelty to Animals) strategy. Oscar's law (The organization's name originates from the story of a dog called Oscar, who was rescued from a puppy factory in central Victoria). and Victorian Labor Party Efforts that restrict the number of dogs per breeding facility and require that pet shop owners keep records of every dog sold.

=== United Kingdom ===
In 1996, Britain passed the Breeding and Sale of Dogs Act which requires annual veterinary inspections for anyone breeding five or more litters in one year. Breeding females are restricted to one litter per year and four per lifetime.

Breeders who choose to be members of the UK Kennel Club are required to register purebred puppies for sale with that organization and must certify the conditions under which the puppies were raised. Breeders who sell puppies by misrepresenting these standards may be liable to prosecution under the Sale of Goods Act 1979.

Members of the UK public frequently buy puppies and kittens without knowing the conditions under which the animals were reared, the Blue Cross estimates from 40,000 to 80,000 puppies are sold that way per year. To prevent this a new law is planned banning the sale of puppies and kittens below the age of 6 months in England except by licensed breeders and rehoming centres. Paula Boyden, of the Dogs Trust, approves of the ban but advised, "potential loopholes" needed to be addressed. She maintains rehoming organisations need regulation.

Lucy's Law, which came into effect in April 2020, is intended to prevent puppy (and kitten) farming by banning third-party sales such as in pet shops.

== Legal cases ==
Chelsea Vancleve v. Chien Et Chat, Inc. stated, "In 2014, the Animal Legal Defense Fund filed a lawsuit against Barkworks, a Southern California pet store chain with six locations." Barkworks tricked many puppy buyers into purchasing sick puppies. They were also making illegal breeder licenses, "fabricating breeding certificates and lying about providing veterinary care" The Animal Defense Fund made a complaint in 2015 that could have turned into a class action. The court prevented the case from going any further as a class action but in 2018, the parties agreed on a settlement. "Barkworks had taken down the misleading in-store signs and closed four of its six retail stores, and the California legislature had passed a law banning the sale of dogs from commercial breeders."

The Humane Society of the United States sued the USDA on March 21, 2018, "for failing to release information in the Animal Welfare Act records we requested under the Freedom of Information. The following day, Congress urged the USDA to restore the records as part of a report accompanying the agency's 2018 spending bill. As of April 20, 2018, USDA had still not restored the records."

The ASPCA (American Society for the Prevention of Cruelty to Animals) filed a lawsuit in 2021 against the USDA "for abandoning its responsibility to enforce the Animal Welfare Act (AWA)" which was put in place on August 24, 1966, to regulate the humane treatment of commercially bred dogs." The AWA requires the USDA to inspect facilities to ensure they meet the minimum requirements of care in which violators would face penalties such as fines and license revocation. The lawsuit claims that the USDA purposefully has chosen to ignore violations which then go unreported and unpunished which has resulted in not a single penalty filed against a commercial dog dealer since 2017 despite overwhelming evidence of cruelty. It was also claimed the USDA did not act even with reported violations on record. As of 2024, the USDA has only issued four recorded punishments to commercial dog dealers out of over 1,000 violations. These commercial dog dealers were still allowed to continue operating.

== See also ==
- Factory farming
- Overpopulation in domestic animals
- Texas puppy mill bill
