= Government bill (law) =

Legislation proposed by executive branch

A government bill is a bill which is proposed, introduced or supported by a government in their country's legislature. It is most significant in the Westminster system where most bills are introduced by the government. This is in contrast to private member's bills which are introduced by members of the legislature who are not part of the executive or cabinet.

Usually, constitutional systems that forbid members of the government from simultaneously being members of the legislature, such as South Korea and the Netherlands, give the government the right to initiate bills in its own right to allow it to introduce government bills. However, in the United States, the right to introduce bills is only given to members of Congress, who cannot simultaneously serve in the executive branch, and the government can only introduce bills "by proxy", via its congressional backers.

Government bills are usually public bills and are often introduced into the chamber of government (in a bicameral system) on which confidence the Government depends (in parliamentary and semi-presidential systems). In the UK, forthcoming government bills are often listed in the King's Speech, a speech from the throne which precedes each session of Parliament.

== See also ==
- Right of initiative (legislative)
- Private member's bill
