= 1980 Cumnock and Doon Valley District Council election =

Cumnock and Doon Valley District Council election

← 1977	1 May 1980	1984 →

All 10 seats to Cumnock and Doon Valley District Council 6 seats needed for a majority
- Registered: 33,658
- Turnout: 50.6%
	First party
	Lab
Party	Labour
Last election	6 seats, 40.1%
Seats won	8
Seat change	▲2
Popular vote	3,828
Percentage	48.2%
Swing	▲8.1
Council Leader before election
Labour
Council Leader after election
Labour

Elections to Cumnock and Doon Valley District Council were held on 1 May 1980, on the same day as the other Scottish local government elections. This was the third election to the district council following the local government reforms in the 1970s.

The election was the last to use the original 10 wards created by the Formation Electoral Arrangements in 1974. Each ward elected one councillor using first-past-the-post voting. Following the Initial Statutory Reviews of Electoral Arrangements in 1981, several wards were changed or abolished.

Labour maintained control of the district council after winning eight of the 10 seats as the party increased their vote share by more than 8% and took nearly half of the popular vote. The other two seats were won by independent candidates. Both the nationalist Scottish Labour Party (SLP) and unionist Conservatives lost all of their seats. For the SLP, which had won two seats in the prior district election, one of their councillors in Patna and Dalrymple resigned the party whip and instead contested the election as an independent while the other councillor, in Old Cumnock Parish, lost to the Labour candidate. The former Conservative seat of Catrine and Sorn was also won by Labour.

== Results ==
1980 Cumnock and Doon Valley District Council election result
Party	Seats	Gains	Losses	Net gain/loss	Seats %	Votes %	Votes	+/−
Labour	8	2	0	▲2	80.0	48.2	3,828	▲8.1
Independent	2	1	0	▲1	20.0	24.8	1,791	▲18.4
SLP	0	0	2	▼2	0.0	16.3	1,290	▼8.3
Conservative	0	0	1	▼1	0.0	8.3	659	Steady
SNP	0	0	0	Steady	0.0	2.4	188	▼14.9
Total	10						7,936	

== Ward results ==
=== Cumnock Burgh ===
Cumnock Burgh
Party	Candidate	Votes	%	±%
Labour	J. King	1,285	61.4	▲21.1
SLP	A. Welsh	793	37.9	▲0.6
Majority		492	23.5	▲20.5
Turnout		2,078	43.1	▼5.2
Registered electors		4,854		
Labour hold		Swing	▲10.8	

=== Lugar, Logan and Muirkirk ===
Lugar, Logan and Muirkirk
Party	Candidate	Votes	%
Labour	J. McGrady	Unopposed	
Registered electors		3,367	
Labour hold			

=== Old Cumnock Parish ===
Old Cumnock Parish
Party	Candidate	Votes	%	±%
Labour	A. Lennox	598	46.6	▼1.9
SLP	W. Pender	497	38.7	▼13.1
SNP	W. Milligan	188	14.7	New
Majority		101	7.9	N/A
Turnout		1,283	54.4	▲10.4
Registered electors		2,357		
Labour gain from SLP		Swing	▲5.6	

=== Auchinleck ===
Auchinleck
Party	Candidate	Votes	%
Labour	J. Allan	Unopposed	
Registered electors		3,596	
Labour hold			

=== Catrine and Sorn ===
Catrine and Sorn
Party	Candidate	Votes	%	±%
Labour	R. Stevenson	820	55.4	▲30.5
Conservative	J. McInnes	659	44.5	▲7.6
Majority		161	10.9	N/A
Turnout		1,479	64.0	▲5.5
Registered electors		2,311		
Labour gain from Conservative		Swing	▲11.4	

=== New Cumnock ===
New Cumnock
Party	Candidate	Votes	%
Labour	J. Paterson	Unopposed	
Registered electors		3,916	
Labour hold			

=== Dalmellington ===
Dalmellington
Party	Candidate	Votes	%	±%
Independent	A. Johnstone	942	64.8	▲23.9
Labour	A. Gormanley	503	34.6	▲13.6
Majority		439	30.2	▲24.4
Turnout		1,445	46.4	▼4.0
Registered electors		3,134		
Independent hold		Swing	▲29.5	

=== Patna and Dalrymple ===
Patna and Dalrymple
Party	Candidate	Votes	%	±%
Independent	T. Hainey	1,029	62.3	New
Labour	M. Rooney	622	37.6	▲3.5
Majority		407	24.7	N/A
Turnout		1,651	53.5	▼5.5
Registered electors		3,089		
Independent gain from SLP		Swing	▲50.8	

=== Drongan, Ochiltree, Rankinston and Stair ===
Drongan, Ochiltree, Rankinston and Stair
Party	Candidate	Votes	%
Labour	J. Hodge	Unopposed	
Registered electors		3,785	
Labour hold			

=== Mauchline ===
Mauchline
Party	Candidate	Votes	%
Labour	D. Shankland	Unopposed	
Registered electors		3,249	
Labour hold			
