= 1992 Cumnock and Doon Valley District Council election =

Cumnock and Doon Valley District Council election

- 7 May 1992

All 10 seats to Cumnock and Doon Valley District Council 6 seats needed for a majority
- Registered: 33,283
- Turnout: 42.7%
	First party
	Lab
Party	Labour
Last election	8 seats, 61.3%
Seats won	10
Seat change	▲2
Popular vote	7,644
Percentage	66.2%
Swing	▲4.9
- Result of the election
Council Leader before election
Labour
Council Leader after election
Labour

Elections to Cumnock and Doon Valley District Council were held on 7 May 1992, on the same day as the other Scottish local government elections. This was the final election to the district council which was abolished in 1995 along with Kilmarnock and Loudoun District Council and replaced by East Ayrshire Council following the implementation of the Local Government etc. (Scotland) Act 1994. The regional council, Strathclyde was also abolished and the new unitary authority took on its responsibilities.

The election was also the last to use the 10 wards created by the Initial Statutory Reviews of Electoral Arrangements in 1981 without alterations. Each ward elected one councillor using first-past-the-post voting.

Labour maintained control of the district council after winning all 10 seats although two were uncontested after only Labour stood a candidate. Despite the uncontested seats, Labour increased their vote share by 4.9% and took nearly two-thirds of the popular vote. The Social Democratic Party and Independent Labour, who both won one seat at the previous election in 1988, lost their only seats.

== Results ==
1992 Cumnock and Doon Valley District Council election result
Party	Seats	Gains	Losses	Net gain/loss	Seats %	Votes %	Votes	+/−
Labour	10	2	0	▲2	100.0	66.2	7,644	▲4.9
Conservative	0	0	0	Steady	0.0	12.2	1,446	▲8.6
Independent	0	0	0	Steady	0.0	11.0	1,271	▲6.9
SNP	0	0	0	Steady	0.0	5.8	666	▼4.8
Independent Labour	0	0	1	▼1	0.0	4.7	534	▼6.5
Total	10						11,561	

== Ward results ==
=== Cumnock East ===
Cumnock East
Party	Candidate	Votes	%
Labour	Eric Ross	Unopposed	
Registered electors		2,677	
Labour hold			

=== Lugar, Logan and Muirkirk ===
Lugar, Logan and Muirkirk
Party	Candidate	Votes	%	±%
Labour	James Kelly	1,267	91.5	▲49.5
Conservative	A. McAdam	109	7.9	New
Majority		1,158	83.6	N/A
Turnout		1,376	47.6	▼10.7
Registered electors		2,905		
Labour gain from Independent Labour		Swing	▲49.0	

=== Cumnock South and Old Cumnock ===
Cumnock South and Old Cumnock
Party	Candidate	Votes	%
Labour	David Sneller	Unopposed	
Registered electors		3,379	
Labour hold			

=== Cumnock West and Auchinleck ===
Cumnock West and Auchinleck
Party	Candidate	Votes	%
Labour	A. Boyd	1,126	85.7
Conservative	B. McAdam	184	14.0
Majority		942	71.7
Turnout		1,314	34.0
Registered electors		3,866	
Labour hold			

=== Catrine, Sorn and North Auchinleck ===
Catrine, Sorn and North Auchinleck
Party	Candidate	Votes	%	±%
Labour	George Smith	666	40.5	▼27.4
Independent	A. McIntyre	615	37.4	New
SNP	M. Hendrie	217	13.2	▼18.7
Conservative	G. Telford	145	8.8	New
Majority		51	3.1	▼32.9
Turnout		1,643	51.0	▲4.4
Registered electors		3,223		
Labour hold		Swing	▼32.4	

=== New Cumnock ===
New Cumnock
Party	Candidate	Votes	%	±%
Labour	Gerald Alexander	884	77.0	▼12.6
Conservative	J. Boswell	216	18.8	New
SNP	A. Montgomery	47	4.1	▼6.2
Majority		668	59.2	▼20.1
Turnout		1,147	33.6	▼13.0
Registered electors		3,420		
Labour hold		Swing	▼3.2	

=== Dalmellington ===
Dalmellington
Party	Candidate	Votes	%	±%
Labour	H. Hattan	897	57.7	▲27.3
Independent	M. Ali	656	42.2	New
Majority		241	15.5	N/A
Turnout		1,553	51.0	▼14.0
Registered electors		3,050		
Labour gain from SDP		Swing	▲41.9	

=== Patna and Dalrymple ===
Patna and Dalrymple
Party	Candidate	Votes	%	±%
Labour	J. Smith	877	84.7	▲19.7
Conservative	E. Castle	155	15.0	New
Majority		722	69.7	▲21.8
Turnout		1,032	32.0	▼19.2
Registered electors		3,235		
Labour hold		Swing	▲18.4	

=== Drongan, Ochiltree, Rankinston and Stair ===
Drongan, Ochiltree, Rankinston and Stair
Party	Candidate	Votes	%	±%
Labour	E. Torrance	1,040	64.2	▼24.2
SNP	J. Keirs	402	24.8	▲13.5
Conservative	M. Castle	176	10.9	New
Majority		638	39.4	▼37.7
Turnout		1,618	42.0	▼8.2
Registered electors		3,853		
Labour hold		Swing	▼18.8	

=== Mauchline ===
Mauchline
Party	Candidate	Votes	%	±%
Labour	E. Rowe	887	47.0	▼5.2
Independent Labour	D. Shankland	534	28.3	▲2.9
Conservative	J. Burgess	461	24.4	▲2.4
Majority		353	18.7	▼8.1
Turnout		3,639	56.8	▲4.9
Registered electors		3,675		
Labour hold		Swing	▼4.0	
