= 1999 East Ayrshire Council election =

East Ayrshire Council election

← 1995	6 May 1999	2003 →

All 32 seats to East Ayrshire Council 17 seats needed for a majority
- Registered: 94,470
- Turnout: 61.8%
	First party	Second party	Third party
	Lab	SNP	Con
Party	Labour	SNP	Conservative
Last election	22 seats, 56.4%	8 seats, 36.1%	0 seats, 7.1%
Seats won	17	14	1
Seat change	▼5	▲6	▲1
Percentage	45.5%	40.9%	9.3%
Swing	▼10.9	▲4.8	▲2.2
- Results by ward
Council Leader before election
Labour
Council Leader after election
Labour

Elections to East Ayrshire Council were held on 6 May 1999, alongside elections to the Scottish Parliament. This was the second election following the local government reforms in 1994 and the first following the Third Statutory Reviews of Electoral Arrangements which resulted in two additional seats from the previous election.

Despite losing five seats, Labour maintained a majority on the council winning 17 of the 32 seats. The Scottish National Party (SNP) remained the largest opposition party after gaining six seats to hold 14 while the Conservatives won their first seat in East Ayrshire.

== Summary ==
1999 East Ayrshire Council election result
Party	Seats	Gains	Losses	Net gain/loss	Seats %	Votes %	Votes	+/−
Labour	17			▼5	53.1	45.5	26,594	▼10.9
SNP	14			▲6	43.8	40.9	23,882	▲4.8
Conservative	1			▲1	3.1	9.3	5,419	▲2.2
Independent	0			Steady	0.0	2.4	1,388	New
Liberal Democrats	0			Steady	0.0	1.9	1,128	▲1.6
Total	32						58,411	

== Ward results ==
=== Stewarton East and Dunlop ===
Stewarton East and Dunlop
Party	Candidate	Votes	%
SNP	B. McNeil	865	44.7
Conservative	J. Thompson	645	33.3
Independent	A. MacDougall	425	22.0
Majority		220	11.4
Turnout		1,935	68.6
Registered electors		2,906	
SNP win (new seat)			

=== Stewarton Central ===
Stewarton Central
Party	Candidate	Votes	%
SNP	K. Hall	1,029	52.2
Labour	J. O'Neill	942	47.8
Majority		87	4.4
Turnout		1,971	65.5
Registered electors		3,143	
SNP win (new seat)			

=== Kilmaurs and Stewarton South ===
Kilmaurs and Stewarton South
Party	Candidate	Votes	%
SNP	A. Hay	829	42.8
Labour	L. Murray	502	25.9
Liberal Democrats	J. McGlip	340	17.5
Conservative	T. Mackie	267	13.8
Majority		327	16.9
Turnout		1,938	66.9
Registered electors		2,954	
SNP win (new seat)			

=== North Kilmarnock, Fenwick and Waterside ===
North Kilmarnock, Fenwick and Waterside
Party	Candidate	Votes	%
Conservative	S. Young	703	37.3
SNP	J. Stevenson	625	33.2
Labour	J. Dalzell	555	29.5
Majority		78	4.1
Turnout		1,883	64.6
Registered electors		2,978	
Conservative win (new seat)			

=== Crosshouse, Gatehead and Knockentiber ===
Ward 6 was renamed Crosshouse, Gatehead and Knockentiber following the Third Statutory Reviews of Electoral Arrangements. The boundary was unchanged.

Crosshouse, Gatehead and Knockentiber
Party	Candidate	Votes	%	±%
Labour	B. Reeves	917	53.4	▼7.0
SNP	J. McGonigale	657	38.2	▲2.4
Conservative	A. Park	144	8.4	▲4.6
Majority		260	15.1	▼9.5
Turnout		1,265	62.6	▲6.9
Registered electors		2,772		
Labour hold		Swing	▼4.7	

=== Altonhill, Hillhead and Longpark ===
Altonhill, Hillhead and Longpark
Party	Candidate	Votes	%
SNP	D. Coffey	983	59.1
Labour	G. Thom	510	30.7
Conservative	I. Mackie	170	10.2
Majority		473	28.4
Turnout		1,663	55.6
Registered electors		3,035	
SNP win (new seat)			

=== Onthank ===
Onthank
Party	Candidate	Votes	%
SNP	W. Coffey	968	58.4
Labour	N. Thom	651	39.3
Independent	J. Currie	39	2.4
Majority		317	19.1
Turnout		1,658	61.3
Registered electors		2,746	
SNP win (new seat)			

=== Kilmarnock Central West ===
Kilmarnock Central West
Party	Candidate	Votes	%
SNP	D. Reid	923	49.5
Labour	W. Cree	783	42.0
Conservative	T. Donald	159	8.5
Majority		140	7.5
Turnout		1,865	64.5
Registered electors		2,927	
SNP win (new seat)			

=== Kilmarnock Central East ===
Kilmarnock Central East
Party	Candidate	Votes	%
SNP	R. Stevenson	736	38.9
Labour	G. Walker	724	38.3
Conservative	J. Mundell	226	12.0
Liberal Democrats	G. Law	204	10.8
Majority		12	0.6
Turnout		1,890	65.9
Registered electors		2,915	
SNP win (new seat)			

=== North New Farm Loch and Dean ===
North New Farm Loch and Dean
Party	Candidate	Votes	%
SNP	J. Weir	731	40.6
Labour	J. Blaney	562	31.2
Independent	M. Donnelley	361	20.0
Conservative	A. McCall	147	8.2
Majority		169	9.4
Turnout		1,801	63.7
Registered electors		2,881	
SNP win (new seat)			

=== South New Farm Loch ===
Ward 2 was renamed South New Farm Loch following the Third Statutory Reviews of Electoral Arrangements. The boundary was unchanged.

South New Farm Loch
Party	Candidate	Votes	%	±%
Labour Co-op	A. MacIntyre	1,125	58.5	▼8.6
SNP	R. Armour	799	41.5	▲10.5
Majority		326	16.9	▼19.2
Turnout		1,924	69.5	▲10.4
Registered electors		2,809		
Labour Co-op hold		Swing	▼9.5	

=== Crookedholm, Moscow, Galston West and Hurlford North ===
Ward 17 was renamed Crookedholm, Moscow, Galston West and Hurlford North following the Third Statutory Reviews of Electoral Arrangements. There were minor changes to the boundary.

Crookedholm, Moscow, Galston West and Hurlford North
Party	Candidate	Votes	%	±%
Labour	D. MacRae	965	51.7	▼0.7
SNP	E. Dickson	711	38.1	▼5.3
Conservative	L. Freeman	189	10.1	▲5.9
Majority		254	13.6	▲4.6
Turnout		1,865	64.4	▲10.3
Registered electors		2,931		
Labour hold		Swing	▲2.3	

=== Newmilns ===
Newmilns
Party	Candidate	Votes	%
SNP	H. Wilson	920	52.5
Labour	J. Spiers	834	47.5
Majority		86	4.9
Turnout		1,754	65.7
Registered electors		2,813	
SNP win (new seat)			

=== Grange and Howard ===
Grange and Howard
Party	Candidate	Votes	%
SNP	I. Linton	780	37.6
Conservative	J. McClymont	685	33.0
Labour	D. Fraser	448	21.6
Liberal Democrats	E. Riley	160	7.7
Majority		95	4.6
Turnout		2,073	70.5
Registered electors		2,976	
SNP win (new seat)			

=== Kilmarnock Central South ===
Kilmarnock Central South
Party	Candidate	Votes	%
Labour Co-op	A. Walsh	770	40.4
SNP	I. Hamilton	727	38.1
Conservative	H. McCall	359	18.8
Independent	C. Rutherford	52	2.7
Majority		43	2.3
Turnout		1,908	61.8
Registered electors		3,133	
Labour Co-op win (new seat)			

=== Riccarton ===
Ward 10 was renamed Riccarton following the Third Statutory Reviews of Electoral Arrangements. There were small changes to the boundary.

Riccarton
Party	Candidate	Votes	%	±%
SNP	A. Campbell	852	45.2	▼4.6
Labour	R. Murray	750	39.8	▼5.6
Conservative	F. Meekin	145	7.7	▲2.9
Liberal Democrats	J. Stewart	139	7.4	New
Majority		102	5.4	▲1.0
Turnout		1,886	62.3	▼9.0
Registered electors		3,069		
SNP hold		Swing	▲0.5	

=== Shortlees ===
Ward 9 was renamed Shortlees following the Third Statutory Reviews of Electoral Arrangements. There were small changes to the boundary.

Shortlees
Party	Candidate	Votes	%	±%
Labour Co-op	J. Danbrough	967	54.1	▼0.5
SNP	C. Gillingham	713	39.9	▼2.2
Conservative	B. Rubin	108	6.0	▲4.4
Majority		254	14.2	▲1.7
Turnout		1,788	58.2	▲3.9
Registered electors		3,132		
Labour Co-op hold		Swing	▲0.8	

=== Bellfield ===
Ward 8 was renamed Bellfield following the Third Statutory Reviews of Electoral Arrangements. There were small changes to the boundary.

Bellfield
Party	Candidate	Votes	%	±%
Labour Co-op	J. Knapp	983	47.7	▼14.5
SNP	J. Todd	862	41.8	▲10.9
Liberal Democrats	A. Todd	143	6.9	New
Conservative	J. Houison-Craufurd	72	3.5	▲0.6
Majority		121	5.9	▼29.4
Turnout		2,060	70.6	▲7.7
Registered electors		2,952		
Labour Co-op hold		Swing	▼12.7	

=== Hurlford ===
Ward 16 was renamed Hurlford following the Third Statutory Reviews of Electoral Arrangements. There were no changes to the boundary.

Hurlford
Party	Candidate	Votes	%	±%
Labour Co-op	J. Raymond	1,123	61.6	▲8.5
SNP	L. MacLean	700	38.4	▼8.5
Majority		423	23.2	▲17.0
Turnout		1,823	59.1	▲5.0
Registered electors		3,168		
Labour Co-op hold		Swing	▲8.5	

=== Galston East ===
Ward 18 was renamed Galston East following the Third Statutory Reviews of Electoral Arrangements. There were minor changes to the boundary.

Galston East
Party	Candidate	Votes	%	±%
SNP	F. MacLean	776	44.8	▼16.7
Labour	P. McWilliams	603	34.8	▼0.3
Conservative	R. Humphreys	213	12.3	▲9.0
Liberal Democrats	L. Riley	142	8.2	New
Majority		173	10.0	▼16.4
Turnout		1,734	60.8	▲5.8
Registered electors		2,881		
SNP hold		Swing	▲8.2	

=== Darvel ===
Darvel
Party	Candidate	Votes	%
SNP	R. McDill	1,317	63.7
Labour	A. Rankin	570	27.6
Conservative	E. Murray	179	8.7
Majority		747	36.2
Turnout		2,066	68.2
Registered electors		3,072	
SNP win (new seat)			

=== Mauchline ===
Mauchline
Party	Candidate	Votes	%	±%
Labour	E. Jackson	1,013	51.2	▼9.3
SNP	R. Clark	618	31.2	▲3.1
Conservative	G. Smith	348	17.6	▲6.1
Majority		395	20.0	▼12.4
Turnout		1,979	51.4	▼5.4
Registered electors		2,875		
Labour hold		Swing	▼6.2	

=== Catrine, Sorn and Mauchline East ===
Catrine, Sorn and Mauchline East
Party	Candidate	Votes	%
Labour Co-op	G. Smith	858	48.1
SNP	D. Shankland	704	39.5
Conservative	N. Martin	222	12.4
Majority		154	8.6
Turnout		1,784	61.8
Registered electors		2,942	
Labour Co-op win (new seat)			

=== Muirkirk, Lugar and Logan ===
Lugar, Logan and Muirkirk was renamed Muirkirk, Lugar and Logan following the Third Statutory Reviews of Electoral Arrangements. There were no changes to the boundary.

Muirkirk, Lugar and Logan
Party	Candidate	Votes	%	±%
Labour	J. Kelly	1,202	69.7	▼13.4
SNP	H. Kelso	522	30.3	▲13.4
Majority		680	39.4	▼26.8
Turnout		1,722	65.5	▲12.6
Registered electors		2,721		
Labour hold		Swing	▼13.4	

=== Drongan, Stair and Rankinston ===
Drongan, Stair and Rankinston
Party	Candidate	Votes	%
Labour Co-op	T. Farrell	1,338	73.6
SNP	J. Keirs	479	26.4
Majority		859	47.3
Turnout		1,817	60.9
Registered electors		3,084	
Labour Co-op win (new seat)			

=== Ochiltree, Skares, Netherthird and Craigens ===
Ochiltree, Skares, Netherthird and Craigens
Party	Candidate	Votes	%
SNP	J. Faulds	791	47.6
Labour	D. Sneller	657	40.2
Conservative	A. Stitt	203	12.2
Majority		134	7.3
Turnout		1,651	62.3
Registered electors		2,704	
SNP win (new seat)			

=== Auchinleck ===
Auchinleck
Party	Candidate	Votes	%
Labour	W. Menzies	983	54.4
SNP	M. Gordan	824	45.6
Majority		159	8.8
Turnout		1,807	62.3
Registered electors		2,955	
Labour win (new seat)			

=== Cumnock West ===
Cumnock West
Party	Candidate	Votes	%
Labour	J. Boyd	1,103	64.2
SNP	A. Kent	616	35.8
Majority		487	28.3
Turnout		1,719	60.6
Registered electors		2,927	
Labour win (new seat)			

=== Cumnock East ===
Cumnock East
Party	Candidate	Votes	%	±%
Labour	E. Ross	1,227	70.2	▼10.8
SNP	A. Milligan	520	29.8	▲10.8
Majority		707	40.4	▼21.6
Turnout		1,747	56.9	▲13.7
Registered electors		3,066		
Labour hold		Swing	▼10.8	

=== Patna and Dalrymple ===
Patna and Dalrymple
Party	Candidate	Votes	%	±%
Labour	E. Dinwoodie	1,095	67.2	▼12.8
SNP	V. Tennant	535	32.8	▲12.8
Majority		560	34.4	▼25.6
Turnout		1,630	54.7	▲14.9
Registered electors		3,066		
Labour hold		Swing	▼12.8	

=== Dalmellington ===
Dalmellington
Party	Candidate	Votes	%	±%
Labour	R. Taylor	864	51.6	▼33.6
Independent	H. O'Neill	511	30.5	New
SNP	N. Gee	299	17.9	▲3.1
Majority		353	21.1	▼49.3
Turnout		1,674	61.1	▲16.9
Registered electors		2,781		
Labour hold		Swing	▼32.0	

=== New Cumnock ===
New Cumnock
Party	Candidate	Votes	%	±%
Labour	J. Carmichael	1,102	61.5	▼23.7
SNP	J. Kelso	456	25.4	▲14.4
Conservative	W. Young	235	13.1	▲9.3
Majority		646	36.1	▼38.2
Turnout		1,793	58.6	▲13.7
Registered electors		3,105		
Labour hold		Swing	▼19.0	
