= 2003 East Ayrshire Council election =

East Ayrshire Council election

← 1999	1 May 2003	2007 →

All 32 seats to East Ayrshire Council 17 seats needed for a majority
- Registered: 92,144
- Turnout: 51.8%
	First party	Second party	Third party
	Lab	SNP	Con
Party	Labour	SNP	Conservative
Last election	17 seats, 45.5%	14 seats, 40.9%	1 seat, 12.1%
Seats won	23	8	1
Seat change	▲6	▼6	Steady
Popular vote	23,480	16,827	5,958
Percentage	49.2%	35.3%	12.5%
Swing	▲3.5	▼5.5	▲3.2
- Results by ward
Council Leader before election
Labour
Council Leader after election
Labour

Elections to East Ayrshire Council were held on 1 May 2003, the same day as the 31 other local government elections in Scotland and elections to the Scottish Parliament. This was the third election since the council's creation in 1995 and the last election to use first-past-the-post voting.

Labour maintained control of the council after increasing their vote share to 49.2%. The party won a majority of the seats and increased their representation on the council. The Scottish National Party (SNP) remained as the largest opposition party on the council despite a net loss of six seats and the Conservatives held their only seat on the council.

Following the introduction of the Local Governance (Scotland) Act 2004, local elections in Scotland would use the single transferable vote electoral system which meant this was the last election in which the 32 single-member wards created by the Third Statutory Reviews of Electoral Arrangements would be contested.

== Summary ==
2003 East Ayrshire Council election result
Party	Seats	Gains	Losses	Net gain/loss	Seats %	Votes %	Votes	+/−
Labour	23	7	1	▲6	71.9	49.2	23,480	▲3.5
SNP	8	1	7	▼6	25.0	35.3	16,827	▼5.5
Conservative	1	0	0	Steady	3.1	12.5	5,958	▲3.2
Independent	0	0	0	Steady	0.0	1.7	814	▼0.8
Scottish Socialist	0	0	0	Steady	0.0	1.2	561	New
BNP	0	0	0	Steady	0.0	0.2	73	New
Total	32						47,713	

== Ward results ==
=== Stewarton East and Dunlop ===
Stewarton East and Dunlop
Party	Candidate	Votes	%	±%
Labour	Maureen McKay	579	37.1	New
Conservative	Kenneth Thomson	506	32.4	▼0.9
SNP	Andrew Kent	476	30.5	▼14.2
Majority		73	4.7	N/A
Turnout		1,561	52.7	▼15.9
Registered electors		2,962		
Labour gain from SNP		Swing	▲25.6	

=== Stewarton Central ===
Stewarton Central
Party	Candidate	Votes	%	±%
Labour	James O'Neill	565	37.9	▼9.9
Independent	Ann Hay	426	28.6	New
SNP	Ian Primrose	342	22.9	▼29.3
Conservative	Tamzin Hobday	158	10.6	New
Majority		139	9.3	N/A
Turnout		1,491	49.2	▼16.3
Registered electors		3,029		
Labour gain from SNP		Swing	▲9.7	

=== Kilmaurs and Stewarton South ===
Kilmaurs and Stewarton South
Party	Candidate	Votes	%	±%
Labour	John McGhee	770	48.3	▲22.4
SNP	John MacKay	516	32.3	▼10.4
Conservative	Thomas Mackie	308	19.3	▲5.5
Majority		254	15.9	N/A
Turnout		1,594	53.2	▼13.7
Registered electors		2,998		
Labour gain from SNP		Swing	▲16.4	

=== North Kilmarnock, Fenwick and Waterside ===
North Kilmarnock, Fenwick and Waterside
Party	Candidate	Votes	%	±%
Conservative	Stephanie Young	832	40.7	▲3.4
SNP	George Leslie	672	32.9	▼0.3
Labour	Robert Allan	541	26.5	▼3.0
Majority		160	7.8	▲3.7
Turnout		2,045	49.7	▼14.9
Registered electors		4,111		
Conservative hold		Swing	▲1.8	

=== Crosshouse, Gatehead and Knockentiber ===
Crosshouse, Gatehead and Knockentiber
Party	Candidate	Votes	%	±%
Labour	Brian Reeves	660	52.2	▼1.2
SNP	David Carrigan	506	40.0	▲1.8
Conservative	Ahsan Mustafa	99	7.8	▼0.6
Majority		154	12.2	▼2.9
Turnout		1,265	48.9	▼13.7
Registered electors		2,588		
Labour hold		Swing	▼1.5	

=== Altonhill, Hillhead and Longpark ===
Altonhill, Hillhead and Longpark
Party	Candidate	Votes	%	±%
SNP	Daniel Coffey	733	54.6	▼4.5
Labour	Andrew McCann	419	31.2	▲0.5
Conservative	Simon Young	116	8.6	▼1.6
Scottish Socialist	Mark Scott	74	5.5	New
Majority		314	23.4	▼5.0
Turnout		1,342	44.3	▼11.3
Registered electors		3,029		
SNP hold		Swing	▼2.5	

=== Onthank ===
Onthank
Party	Candidate	Votes	%	±%
SNP	Willie Coffey	714	56.3	▼2.1
Labour	Robert Milby	506	39.9	▲0.6
Scottish Socialist	Hugh Ferguson	36	2.8	New
Conservative	Thomas Donald	13	1.0	New
Majority		208	16.4	▼2.7
Turnout		1,269	51.5	▼9.8
Registered electors		2,462		
SNP hold		Swing	▼1.3	

=== Kilmarnock Central West ===
Kilmarnock Central West
Party	Candidate	Votes	%	±%
SNP	Douglas Reid	737	51.5	▲2.0
Labour	Robert Keohone	569	39.8	▼2.2
Conservative	Fredrick McMeekin	125	8.7	▲0.2
Majority		168	11.7	▲4.2
Turnout		1,431	51.5	▼12.0
Registered electors		2,727		
SNP hold		Swing	▲2.1	

=== Kilmarnock Central East ===
Kilmarnock Central East
Party	Candidate	Votes	%	±%
Labour	William Cree	719	46.3	▲8.0
SNP	Lilian MacLean	646	41.6	▲2.7
Conservative	Leonard Freeman	189	12.2	▲0.2
Majority		73	4.7	N/A
Turnout		1,554	55.0	▼10.9
Registered electors		2,826		
Labour gain from SNP		Swing	▲2.6	

=== North New Farm Loch and Dean ===
North New Farm Loch and Dean
Party	Candidate	Votes	%	±%
SNP	John Weir	637	44.3	▲3.7
Labour	John Blaney	466	32.4	▲1.2
Independent	Matthew Donnelley	220	15.3	▼4.7
Conservative	Thomas Johnson	116	8.1	▼0.1
Majority		171	11.9	▲2.5
Turnout		1,439	50.7	▼13.0
Registered electors		2,838		
SNP hold		Swing	▲1.2	

=== South New Farm Loch ===
South New Farm Loch
Party	Candidate	Votes	%	±%
Labour Co-op	Andrew MacIntyre	953	62.5	▲4.0
SNP	Matthew Connelly	487	32.0	▼9.5
Conservative	Alexander Park	84	5.5	New
Majority		466	30.6	▲13.7
Turnout		1,524	57.2	▼12.3
Registered electors		2,664		
Labour Co-op hold		Swing	▲6.7	

=== Crookedholm, Moscow, Galston West and Hurlford North ===
Crookedholm, Moscow, Galston West and Hurlford North
Party	Candidate	Votes	%	±%
Labour Co-op	Isabella MacRae	801	55.2	▲3.5
SNP	Francis Dawson	528	36.4	▼1.8
Conservative	Moira McLean	122	8.4	▼1.7
Majority		273	18.8	▲2.6
Turnout		1,451	51.8	▼10.8
Registered electors		2,802		
Labour Co-op hold		Swing	▲2.6	

=== Newmilns ===
Newmilns
Party	Candidate	Votes	%	±%
SNP	Henry Wilson	805	58.0	▲5.5
Labour Co-op	Janice Spiers	409	29.5	▼18.0
Conservative	George Park	174	12.5	New
Majority		396	28.5	▲23.6
Turnout		1,388	52.7	▼13.0
Registered electors		2,633		
SNP hold		Swing	▲11.7	

=== Grange and Howard ===
Grange and Howard
Party	Candidate	Votes	%	±%
SNP	Iain Linton	765	42.0	▲4.4
Conservative	Thomas Cook	604	33.2	▲0.2
Labour Co-op	John Goodwin	452	24.8	▲3.2
Majority		161	8.8	▲4.2
Turnout		1,821	59.8	▼10.7
Registered electors		3,044		
SNP hold		Swing	▲2.1	

=== Kilmarnock Central South ===
Kilmarnock Central South
Party	Candidate	Votes	%	±%
SNP	John Campbell	706	43.3	▲5.2
Labour Co-op	Alexander Walsh	654	40.1	▼0.3
Conservative	Henry McCall	269	16.5	▼2.3
Majority		52	3.2	N/A
Turnout		1,629	52.0	▼9.8
Registered electors		3,132		
SNP gain from Labour Co-op		Swing	▲2.7	

=== Riccarton ===
Riccarton
Party	Candidate	Votes	%	±%
Labour Co-op	Ray Murray	711	51.2	▲11.4
SNP	John Keast	497	35.8	▼9.4
Conservative	Rose-Ann Fergusson-Cuninghame	181	13.0	▲5.3
Majority		214	15.4	N/A
Turnout		1,389	48.3	▼14.0
Registered electors		2,877		
Labour Co-op gain from SNP		Swing	▲10.4	

=== Shortlees ===
Shortlees
Party	Candidate	Votes	%	±%
Labour Co-op	Jane Danbrough	680	51.6	▼2.5
SNP	William McCulloch	511	38.8	▼1.1
Scottish Socialist	Colin Rutherford	72	5.5	New
Conservative	Peter Houison-Craufurd	55	4.2	▼1.8
Majority		169	12.8	▼1.4
Turnout		1,318	44.7	▼13.5
Registered electors		2,951		
Labour Co-op hold		Swing	▼0.7	

=== Bellfield ===
Bellfield
Party	Candidate	Votes	%	±%
Labour Co-op	John Knapp	999	62.9	▲15.2
SNP	Stephen McCluskey	406	25.6	▼16.2
Scottish Socialist	Colin Berry	118	7.4	New
Conservative	Robert Yuill	64	4.0	▲0.5
Majority		596	37.4	▲21.5
Turnout		1,227	56.5	▼14.1
Registered electors		2,811		
Labour Co-op hold		Swing	▲15.7	

=== Hurlford ===
Hurlford
Party	Candidate	Votes	%	±%
Labour Co-op	James Raymond	998	70.6	▲9.0
SNP	Arthur Sharp	328	23.2	▼15.2
Conservative	Alice McCall	88	6.2	New
Majority		670	47.3	▲24.2
Turnout		1,414	47.0	▼12.1
Registered electors		3,006		
Labour Co-op hold		Swing	▲17.1	

=== Galston East ===
Galston East
Party	Candidate	Votes	%	±%
Labour Co-op	Stuart Finlayson	744	51.2	▲16.4
SNP	Finlay MacLean	553	38.0	▼6.8
Conservative	Sara Donald	157	10.8	▲7.0
Majority		191	13.1	N/A
Turnout		1,454	54.8	▼6.0
Registered electors		2,651		
Labour Co-op gain from SNP		Swing	▲11.6	

=== Darvel ===
Darvel
Party	Candidate	Votes	%	±%
SNP	Robert McDill	1,110	69.7	▲6.0
Labour Co-op	Graham Mitchell	364	22.8	▼4.8
Conservative	Elizabeth Murray	119	7.5	▼1.2
Majority		746	46.8	▲10.6
Turnout		1,593	54.7	▼13.5
Registered electors		2,914		
SNP hold		Swing	▲5.4	

=== Mauchline ===
Mauchline
Party	Candidate	Votes	%	±%
Labour	Eric Jackson	867	53.3	▲2.1
SNP	David Shankland	455	28.3	▼2.9
Conservative	Martin Nicholas	297	18.5	▲0.9
Majority		402	25.0	▲5.0
Turnout		1,609	56.0	▲4.6
Registered electors		2,875		
Labour hold		Swing	▲2.5	

=== Catrine, Sorn and Mauchline East ===
Catrine, Sorn and Mauchline East
Party	Candidate	Votes	%	±%
Labour Co-op	George Smith	779	51.4	▲3.3
SNP	Jacqueline Todd	500	33.0	▼6.5
Conservative	Kenneth Stirling	238	15.7	▲3.4
Majority		279	18.4	▲9.8
Turnout		1,517	52.3	▼9.5
Registered electors		2,898		
Labour Co-op hold		Swing	▲4.9	

=== Muirkirk, Lugar and Logan ===
Muirkirk, Lugar and Logan
Party	Candidate	Votes	%	±%
Labour	James Kelly	975	69.2	▼0.5
SNP	Helen Kelso	269	19.1	▼11.2
Scottish Socialist	Mark Gilroy	91	6.5	New
Conservative	Peter Smith	73	5.2	New
Majority		706	50.1	▲10.7
Turnout		1,408	55.3	▼10.2
Registered electors		2,544		
Labour hold		Swing	▲5.3	

=== Drongan, Stair and Rankinston ===
Drongan, Stair and Rankinston
Party	Candidate	Votes	%	±%
Labour Co-op	Thomas Farrell	982	65.1	▼8.5
SNP	John MacAulay	251	16.6	▼9.8
Conservative	James Hume	180	11.9	New
Independent	Robert Shennan	96	6.4	New
Majority		731	48.4	▲1.1
Turnout		1,509	49.0	▼11.9
Registered electors		3,079		
Labour Co-op hold		Swing	▲0.6	

=== Ochiltree, Skares, Netherthird and Craigens ===
Ochiltree, Skares, Netherthird and Craigens
Party	Candidate	Votes	%	±%
Labour Co-op	William Menzies	772	49.2	▲9.0
SNP	Julie Faulds	657	41.8	▼5.8
Conservative	Ian Waller	141	9.0	▼3.2
Majority		115	7.3	N/A
Turnout		1,570	54.0	▼8.3
Registered electors		2,908		
Labour Co-op gain from SNP		Swing	▲7.4	

=== Auchinleck ===
Auchinleck
Party	Candidate	Votes	%	±%
Labour	Neil McGhee	924	62.9	▲8.5
SNP	Iain Robb	343	23.4	▼22.2
Scottish Socialist	Gareth Jenkins	89	6.1	New
BNP	Stephen Burns	73	5.0	New
Conservative	Primpton Sword	39	2.7	New
Majority		581	39.6	▲30.8
Turnout		1,468	52.6	▼9.7
Registered electors		2,790		
Labour hold		Swing	▲15.3	

=== Cumnock West ===
Cumnock West
Party	Candidate	Votes	%	±%
Labour	William Crawford	839	59.4	▼4.8
SNP	Katherine Smith	303	21.4	▼14.4
Conservative	Gary Smith	141	10.0	New
Scottish Socialist	James Monaghan	130	9.2	New
Majority		536	37.9	▲9.6
Turnout		1,413	48.7	▼11.9
Registered electors		2,903		
Labour hold		Swing	▲4.8	

=== Cumnock East ===
Cumnock East
Party	Candidate	Votes	%	±%
Labour	Eric Ross	961	78.4	▲8.2
SNP	James Kelso	215	17.5	▼12.3
Conservative	Craig Allison	50	4.1	New
Majority		746	60.8	▲20.4
Turnout		1,226	46.3	▼10.6
Registered electors		2,650		
Labour hold		Swing	▲13.2	

=== Patna and Dalrymple ===
Patna and Dalrymple
Party	Candidate	Votes	%	±%
Labour	Elaine Dinwoodie	1,039	71.5	▲4.3
Conservative	Sophie Brodie	215	14.8	New
SNP	Alexander MacKenzie	200	13.8	▼19.0
Majority		824	56.7	▲22.3
Turnout		1,454	47.7	▼7.0
Registered electors		3,051		
Labour hold		Swing	▲11.6	

=== Dalmellington ===
Dalmellington
Party	Candidate	Votes	%	±%
Labour	Elaine Stewart	789	52.7	▲1.1
SNP	Andrew Filson	645	43.1	▲25.2
Conservative	James Boswell	40	2.7	New
Scottish Socialist	Anne Baker	23	1.5	New
Majority		144	9.6	▼11.5
Turnout		1,497	58.6	▼2.5
Registered electors		2,555		
Labour hold		Swing	▼12.0	

=== New Cumnock ===
New Cumnock
Party	Candidate	Votes	%	±%
Labour	James Carmichael	1,004	67.7	▲6.2
SNP	Michael Lopez	314	21.2	▲4.3
Conservative	Walter Young	165	11.1	New
Majority		690	46.5	▲25.4
Turnout		1,483	52.3	▼8.8
Registered electors		2,836		
Labour hold		Swing	▲0.9	

== By-elections (2003–07) ==
Altonhill, Hillhead and Longpark by-election, 18 May 2006
Party	Candidate	Votes	%	±%
SNP	Helen Coffey	715	59.0	▲4.4
Labour	Matthew McLaughlin	296	24.4	▼6.8
Conservative	James Adams	178	14.7	▲6.1
Scottish Socialist	Colin Rutherford	23	1.9	▼3.6
Majority		419	34.6	▲11.2
Turnout		1,212	42.2	▼2.1
Registered electors		2,869		
SNP hold		Swing	▲5.6	
