= 1988 Cumnock and Doon Valley District Council election =

Cumnock and Doon Valley District Council election

- 5 May 1988

All 10 seats to Cumnock and Doon Valley District Council 6 seats needed for a majority
- Registered: 33,664
- Turnout: 52.6% (Note: Excludes uncontested wards.)
	First party	Second party	Third party
	Lab	ILab	SDP
Party	Labour	Independent Labour	SDP
Last election	10 seats, 70.2%	0 seats, 13.4%	N/A
Seats won	8	1	1
Seat change	▼2	▲1	▲1
Popular vote	7,655	1,399	1,163
Percentage	61.3%	11.3%	9.4%
Swing	▼8.9	▼2.1	New (Note: At the 1984 election, the Social Democratic Party (SDP) won 6.7% of the vote. They subsequently merged with the Liberal Party in March 1988 to form the Social and Liberal Democrats. Some members of the SDP opposed the merger and split to form a new Social Democratic Party.)
Council Leader before election
Labour
Council Leader after election
Labour

Elections to Cumnock and Doon Valley District Council were held on 5 May 1988, on the same day as the other Scottish local government elections. This was the fifth election to the district council following the local government reforms in the 1970s.

The election used the 10 wards created by the Initial Statutory Reviews of Electoral Arrangements in 1981. Each ward elected one councillor using first-past-the-post voting.

Labour maintained a large majority on the district council after winning eight of the 10 seats although four wards were uncontested after only Labour stood a candidate. Labour's vote share fell by 8.9% as they lost two seats from previous election in 1984. The newly formed Social Democratic Party (SDP) won a seat in Cumnock and Doon Valley for the first time – their only seat in Scotland at the 1988 elections – and the remaining seat was won by Independent Labour.

== Results ==
1988 Cumnock and Doon Valley District Council election result
Party	Seats	Gains	Losses	Net gain/loss	Seats %	Votes %	Votes	+/−
Labour	8	0	2	▼2	80.0	61.3	7,655	▼8.9
Independent Labour	1	1	0	▲1	10.0	11.3	1,399	▼2.1
SDP	1	1	0	▲1	10.0	9.4	1,163	New
SNP	0	0	0	Steady	0.0	10.6	1,319	New
Independent	0	0	0	Steady	0.0	4.1	506	New
Conservative	0	0	0	Steady	0.0	3.6	449	▼14.0
Total	10						12,491	

== Ward results ==
=== Cumnock East ===
Cumnock East
Party	Candidate	Votes	%
Labour	Eric Ross	Unopposed	
Registered electors		2,756	
Labour hold			

=== Lugar, Logan and Muirkirk ===
Lugar, Logan and Muirkirk
Party	Candidate	Votes	%	±%
Independent Labour	J. Cannon	880	48.5	New
Labour	N. Valentine	763	42.1	▼26.2
SNP	S. Patterson	167	9.2	New
Majority		117	6.4	N/A
Turnout		1,810	58.3	▲2.8
Registered electors		2,905		
Independent Labour gain from Labour		Swing	▲37.3	

=== Cumnock South and Old Cumnock ===
Cumnock South and Old Cumnock
Party	Candidate	Votes	%
Labour	David Sneller	Unopposed	
Registered electors		3,489	
Labour hold			

=== Cumnock West and Auchinleck ===
Cumnock West and Auchinleck
Party	Candidate	Votes	%
Labour	Jean Allan	Unopposed	
Registered electors		3,804	
Labour hold			

=== Catrine, Sorn and North Auchinleck ===
Catrine, Sorn and North Auchinleck
Party	Candidate	Votes	%	±%
Labour	A. McIntyre	948	67.9	▼4.8
SNP	J. Kellighan	445	31.9	New
Majority		503	36.0	▼9.7
Turnout		1,393	40.5	▲10.9
Registered electors		3,451		
Labour hold		Swing	▼18.3	

=== New Cumnock ===
New Cumnock
Party	Candidate	Votes	%
Labour	Gerald Alexander	1,517	89.6
SNP	I. Hamilton	175	10.3
Majority		1,342	79.3
Turnout		1,692	46.6
Registered electors		3,633	
Labour hold			

=== Dalmellington ===
Dalmellington
Party	Candidate	Votes	%	±%
SDP	M. Ali	1,163	56.5	New
Labour	H. Walker	626	30.4	▼21.0
Independent	T. Gormanley	171	8.3	New
SNP	D. Kerr	96	4.7	New
Majority		537	26.1	N/A
Turnout		2,056	65.0	▲16.2
Registered electors		3,166		
SDP gain from Labour		Swing	▲28.2	

At the 1984 election, the Social Democratic Party (SDP) won 48.4% of the vote in Dalmellington. They subsequently merged with the Liberal Party in March 1988 to form the Social and Liberal Democrats. Some members of the SDP opposed the merger and split to form a new Social Democratic Party.

=== Patna and Dalrymple ===
Patna and Dalrymple
Party	Candidate	Votes	%	±%
Labour	J. Smith	1,040	65.0	▲6.4
Independent	M. T. Frew	273	17.1	New
SNP	J. Bradford	219	13.7	New
Independent	W. Harvey	62	3.9	New
Majority		767	47.9	▲30.5
Turnout		1,594	51.2	▲3.3
Registered electors		3,126		
Labour hold		Swing	▲23.8	

=== Drongan, Ochiltree, Rankinston and Stair ===
Drongan, Ochiltree, Rankinston and Stair
Party	Candidate	Votes	%	±%
Labour	J. Hodge	1,694	88.4	▲11.4
SNP	J. McMaster	217	11.3	New
Majority		1,477	77.1	▲10.2
Turnout		1,911	50.2	▼8.1
Registered electors		3,816		
Labour hold		Swing	▲10.7	

=== Mauchline ===
Mauchline
Party	Candidate	Votes	%
Labour	E. Rowe	1,067	52.2
Independent Labour	D. Shankland	519	25.4
Conservative	J. Borland	449	22.0
Majority		548	26.8
Turnout		2,035	58.1
Registered electors		3,518	
Labour hold			
