= 1995 East Ayrshire Council election =

East Ayrshire Council election

- 6 April 1995

All 30 seats to East Ayrshire Council 16 seats needed for a majority
- Registered: 95,440
- Turnout: 52.5
	First party	Second party
	Lab	SNP
Party	Labour	SNP
Last election	18 seats, 46.1%	7 seats, 29.9%
Seats won	22	8
Seat change	▲4	▲1
Popular vote	28,292	18,101
Percentage	56.4%	36.1%
Swing	▲10.5	▲6.2
Council Leader after election
Labour

The first elections to East Ayrshire Council were held on 6 April 1995, on the same day as the 28 other Scottish local government elections. The council was created from the former Cumnock and Doon Valley and Kilmarnock and Loudoun district councils and assumed some of the responsibilities of the former Strathclyde Regional Council following the implementation of the Local Government etc. (Scotland) Act 1994.

The election was the first since the Second Statutory Reviews of Electoral Arrangements which was initially meant to decide boundaries for the district and regional councils. After the district councils were abolished by the Local Government etc. (Scotland) Act 1994, the review was instead used to decide boundaries for the newly created unitary authority. As a result, there remained 10 seats covering the former Cumnock and Doon Valley District and 20 seats were established for the former Kilmarnock and Loudoun District, two more than had been in use since the Initial Statutory Reviews of Electoral Arrangements in 1981.

Labour took control of the council after winning 22 of the 30 seats. The other eight seats were won by the Scottish National Party (SNP).

== Summary ==
1995 East Ayrshire Council election result
Party	Seats	Gains	Losses	Net gain/loss	Seats %	Votes %	Votes	+/−
Labour	22			▲4	56.4	73.3	28,292	▲10.4
SNP	8			▲1	36.1	26.7	18,101	▲6.2
Conservative	0			▼3	0.0	6.9	3,481	▼12.1
Liberal Democrats	0			Steady	0.0	0.3	163	Steady
Independent	0			Steady	0.0	0.2	84	Steady
Total	30						50,121	

== Ward results ==
=== Ward 1 ===
Ward 1
Party	Candidate	Votes	%
SNP	Gordon McCreadie	869	53.4
Labour	K. Gordon	644	39.6
Conservative	A. McCall	114	7.0
Majority		225	13.8
Turnout		1,627	49.8
Registered electors		3,269	
SNP win (new seat)			

=== Ward 2 ===
Ward 2
Party	Candidate	Votes	%
Labour	Andrew McIntyre	1,190	67.1
SNP	R. Rowe	549	31.0
Conservative	B. Rubin	34	1.9
Majority		641	36.1
Turnout		1,773	59.1
Registered electors		3,001	
Labour win (new seat)			

=== Ward 3 ===
Ward 3
Party	Candidate	Votes	%
Labour	Irene Reeves	841	46.7
SNP	C. Calman	802	44.6
Conservative	J. Howard	157	8.7
Majority		39	2.1
Turnout		1,800	56.2
Registered electors		3,203	
Labour win (new seat)			

=== Ward 4 ===
Ward 4
Party	Candidate	Votes	%
Labour	Gordon Cree	1,004	58.2
SNP	J. Tannock	630	36.5
Conservative	T. Donald	92	5.3
Majority		374	21.7
Turnout		1,726	55.9
Registered electors		3,089	
Labour win (new seat)			

=== Ward 5 ===
Ward 5
Party	Candidate	Votes	%
SNP	Douglas Reid	748	44.6
Labour	W. Denim	637	37.9
Conservative	H. McCall	244	14.5
Liberal Democrats	J. Stewart	50	3.0
Majority		111	6.7
Turnout		1,679	54.3
Registered electors		3,092	
SNP win (new seat)			

=== Ward 6 ===
Ward 6
Party	Candidate	Votes	%
Labour	Wilma Doyle	937	60.4
SNP	J. Weir	555	35.8
Conservative	A. Park	59	3.8
Majority		382	24.6
Turnout		1,551	55.1
Registered electors		2,813	
Labour win (new seat)			

=== Ward 7 ===
Ward 7
Party	Candidate	Votes	%
SNP	Ronald Brailsford	607	36.8
Conservative	M. Porter	532	32.2
Labour	J. Dalzell	424	25.7
Liberal Democrats	W. Stevenson	85	5.2
Majority		75	4.6
Turnout		1,648	46.8
Registered electors		3,518	
SNP win (new seat)			

=== Ward 8 ===
Ward 8
Party	Candidate	Votes	%
Labour	Robert Stirling	1,222	66.2
SNP	F. Gillingham	570	30.9
Conservative	E. Murray	53	2.9
Majority		652	35.3
Turnout		1,845	62.9
Registered electors		2,933	
Labour win (new seat)			

=== Ward 9 ===
Ward 9
Party	Candidate	Votes	%
Labour	Jane Danbrough	907	54.6
SNP	J. Todd	700	42.1
Liberal Democrats	A. Stevenson	28	1.7
Conservative	J. Houison-Craufurd	26	1.6
Majority		207	12.5
Turnout		1,661	54.3
Registered electors		3,058	
Labour win (new seat)			

=== Ward 10 ===
Ward 10
Party	Candidate	Votes	%
SNP	Alan Campbell	897	49.8
Labour	J. Blaney	817	45.4
Conservative	F. Meekin	86	4.8
Majority		80	4.4
Turnout		1,800	53.3
Registered electors		3,376	
SNP win (new seat)			

=== Ward 11 ===
Ward 11
Party	Candidate	Votes	%
Labour	James O'Neill	670	37.9
SNP	M. Steele	564	31.9
Conservative	A. MacDougall	535	30.2
Majority		106	6.0
Turnout		1,769	54.5
Registered electors		3,245	
Labour win (new seat)			

=== Ward 12 ===
Ward 12
Party	Candidate	Votes	%
SNP	Kate Hall	614	38.4
Labour	R. Kay	554	34.6
Conservative	J. Thompson	432	27.0
Majority		60	1.8
Turnout		1,600	49.5
Registered electors		3,234	
SNP win (new seat)			

=== Ward 13 ===
Ward 13
Party	Candidate	Votes	%
Labour	Robert Beattie	1,005	53.9
SNP	J. Caddis	629	33.8
Conservative	L. Freeman	229	12.3
Majority		376	20.1
Turnout		1,863	54.5
Registered electors		3,420	
Labour win (new seat)			

=== Ward 14 ===
Ward 14
Party	Candidate	Votes	%
Labour	John Knapp	995	51.8
SNP	W. Coffey	926	48.2
Majority		69	3.6
Turnout		1,921	63.5
Registered electors		3,023	
Labour win (new seat)			

=== Ward 15 ===
Ward 15
Party	Candidate	Votes	%
SNP	Daniel Coffey	978	63.6
Labour	R.Russell	475	30.9
Independent	J. Porter	84	5.5
Majority		503	32.7
Turnout		1,537	48.6
Registered electors		3,164	
SNP win (new seat)			

=== Ward 16 ===
Ward 16
Party	Candidate	Votes	%
Labour	David Fulton	929	53.1
SNP	M. McGhee	819	46.9
Majority		110	6.2
Turnout		1,748	54.1
Registered electors		3,233	
Labour win (new seat)			

=== Ward 17 ===
Ward 17
Party	Candidate	Votes	%
Labour	David MacRae	906	52.4
SNP	F. MacLean	751	43.4
Conservative	S. Young	73	4.2
Majority		155	9.0
Turnout		1,730	58.7
Registered electors		2,947	
Labour win (new seat)			

=== Ward 18 ===
Ward 18
Party	Candidate	Votes	%
SNP	Kim Nicoll	975	61.5
Labour	J. Raymond	557	35.1
Conservative	R. Humphreys	53	3.3
Majority		418	26.4
Turnout		1,585	55.0
Registered electors		2,880	
SNP win (new seat)			

=== Ward 19 ===
Ward 19
Party	Candidate	Votes	%
Labour	George Turnbull	887	52.6
SNP	W. Loudon	694	41.1
Conservative	M. Younger	106	6.3
Majority		193	11.5
Turnout		1,687	59.7
Registered electors		2,826	
Labour win (new seat)			

=== Ward 20 ===
Ward 20
Party	Candidate	Votes	%
SNP	Robert McDill	1,239	68.2
Labour	A. Allison	486	26.8
Conservative	D. Buchanan	91	5.0
Majority		753	41.4
Turnout		1,816	56.0
Registered electors		3,245	
SNP win (new seat)			

=== Cumnock East ===
Cumnock East
Party	Candidate	Votes	%	±%
Labour	Eric Ross	1,209	81.0	N/A
SNP	J. Maxwell	284	19.0	N/A
Majority		925	62.0	N/A
Turnout		1,493	46.2	N/A
Registered electors		3,235		
Labour hold		Swing	N/A	

=== Lugar, Logan and Muirkirk ===
Lugar, Logan and Muirkirk
Party	Candidate	Votes	%	±%
Labour	James Kelly	1,258	83.1	▼8.4
SNP	J. Taylor	256	16.9	New
Majority		1,002	66.2	▼17.4
Turnout		1,514	52.9	▲4.6
Registered electors		2,861		
Labour hold		Swing	▼12.6	

=== Cumnock South and Old Cumnock ===
Cumnock South and Old Cumnock
Party	Candidate	Votes	%	±%
Labour	David Sneller	1,247	75.9	N/A
SNP	K. Cairney	395	24.1	N/A
Majority		852	51.8	N/A
Turnout		1,642	49.1	N/A
Registered electors		3,342		
Labour hold		Swing	N/A	

=== Cumnock West and Auchinleck ===
Cumnock West and Auchinleck
Party	Candidate	Votes	%	±%
Labour	Jimmy Boyd	1,258	79.5	▼6.2
SNP	L. McBride	257	16.2	New
Conservative	B. McAdam	67	4.2	▼9.8
Majority		1,001	63.3	▼8.4
Turnout		1,582	48.2	▲14.2
Registered electors		3,281		
Labour hold		Swing	▼11.2	

=== Catrine, Sorn and North Auchinleck ===
Catrine, Sorn and North Auchinleck
Party	Candidate	Votes	%	±%
Labour	George Smith	1,058	71.7	▲31.2
SNP	R. Clark	329	22.3	▲9.1
Conservative	M. McWhirter	89	6.0	▼2.8
Majority		729	49.4	▲46.3
Turnout		1,476	46.4	▼4.6
Registered electors		3,178		
Labour hold		Swing	▲11.0	

=== New Cumnock ===
New Cumnock
Party	Candidate	Votes	%	±%
Labour	Jim Carmicheal	1,282	85.2	▲8.2
SNP	W. Buntain	165	11.0	▲6.9
Conservative	A. McAdam	57	3.8	▼15.0
Majority		1,117	74.2	▲16.0
Turnout		1,504	44.9	▲11.3
Registered electors		3,351		
Labour hold		Swing	▲11.6	

=== Dalmellington ===
Dalmellington
Party	Candidate	Votes	%	±%
Labour	Rab Taylor	1,127	85.2	▲27.5
SNP	A. Lambert	196	14.8	New
Majority		931	70.4	▲54.9
Turnout		1,323	44.2	▲6.8
Registered electors		2,991		
Labour hold		Swing	▲34.8	

=== Patna and Dalrymple ===
Patna and Dalrymple
Party	Candidate	Votes	%	±%
Labour	John Smith	988	80.0	▼4.7
SNP	V. Tennant	247	20.0	New
Majority		741	60.0	▼9.7
Turnout		1,235	39.8	▲7.8
Registered electors		3,104		
Labour hold		Swing	▼12.3	

=== Drongan, Ochiltree, Rankinston and Stair ===
Drongan, Ochiltree, Rankinston and Stair
Party	Candidate	Votes	%	±%
Labour	Thomas Farrell	1,517	79.8	▲15.6
SNP	J. Neill	270	14.2	▼10.6
Conservative	M. Castle	113	5.9	▼5.0
Majority		1,247	65.6	▲26.2
Turnout		1,900	49.3	▲7.3
Registered electors		3,853		
Labour hold		Swing	▲13.1	

=== Mauchline ===
Mauchline
Party	Candidate	Votes	%	±%
Labour	Eric Jackson	1,261	60.5	▲13.5
SNP	R. McLean	586	28.1	New
Conservative	J. Borland	239	11.5	▼12.9
Majority		675	32.4	▲13.7
Turnout		2,086	56.8	▲4.9
Registered electors		3,675		
Labour hold		Swing	▲20.9	

== Notes ==
1. Note 1- In 1992, Labour won 10 seats in Cumnock and Doon Valley and 8 seats in Kilmarnock and Loudoun.
2. Note 2- In 1992, the SNP won no seats in Cumnock and Doon Valley and 7 seats in Kilmarnock and Loudoun.
