= Old Cumnock Parish (ward) =

Scottish electoral ward

- Cumnock and Doon Valley
- Electorate: 2,357 (1980)
- Major settlements: Cumnock
- UK Parliament constituency: Carrick, Cumnock and Doon Valley

1974–1984
- Number of councillors: 1
- Replaced by: Cumnock South and Old Cumnock; Cumnock West and Auchinleck

Old Cumnock Parish was one of 10 electoral wards of Cumnock and Doon Valley District Council. Created in 1974, the ward elected one councillor using the first-past-the-post voting electoral system.

The ward produced strong results for Labour with the party holding the seat at two of the three elections. It was also one of the Scottish Labour Party's (SLP) few successes in the 1977 local elections.

In 1984, the ward was abolished and the area covered by it split between two newly created wards – Cumnock South and Old Cumnock and Cumnock West and Auchinleck.

== Boundaries ==
The Old Cumnock Parish ward was created in 1974 by the Formation Electoral Arrangements from the previous Old Cumnock electoral division of Ayr County Council. The ward took in part of the town of Cumnock, south of Cumnock Burgh and took in an area in the centre of Cumnock and Doon Valley. Following the Initial Statutory Reviews of Electoral Arrangements in 1981 the ward was abolished and replaced by two new wards – Cumnock South and Old Cumnock and Cumnock West and Auchinleck.

== Councillors ==
Election	Councillor
1974	T. McIntyre
1977	J. King
1980	A. Lennox

== Election results ==
=== 1980 election ===
Old Cumnock Parish
Party	Candidate	Votes	%	±%
Labour	A. Lennox	598	46.6	▼1.9
SLP	W. Pender	497	38.7	▼13.1
SNP	W. Milligan	188	14.7	New
Majority		101	7.9	N/A
Turnout		1,283	54.4	▲10.4
Registered electors		2,357		
Labour gain from SLP		Swing	▲5.6	

=== 1977 election ===
Old Cumnock Parish
Party	Candidate	Votes	%
SLP	W. Pender	543	51.8
Labour	J. Smith	506	48.2
Majority		37	3.6
Turnout		1,049	44.0
Registered electors		2,399	
SLP gain from Labour			

=== 1974 election ===
Old Cumnock Parish
Party	Candidate	Votes	%
Labour	T. McIntyre	Unopposed	
Registered electors		2,426	
Labour win (new seat)			
