= 1977 Cumnock and Doon Valley District Council election =

Cumnock and Doon Valley District Council election

- 3 May 1977

All 10 seats to Cumnock and Doon Valley District Council 6 seats needed for a majority
- Registered: 33,600
- Turnout: 51.7% (Note: Excludes uncontested wards.)
	First party	Second party	Third party
	Lab	SLP	Con
Party	Labour	SLP	Conservative
Last election	8 seats, 35.5%	N/A	1 seat, 20.7%
Seats won	6	2	1
Seat change	▼2	▲2	Steady
Popular vote	4,613	2,845	954
Percentage	40.1%	24.7%	8.3%
Swing	▲4.6	▲24.7	▼12.4
Council Leader before election
Labour
Council Leader after election
Labour

Elections to Cumnock and Doon Valley District Council were held on 3 May 1977, on the same day as the other Scottish local government elections. This was the second election to the district council following the local government reforms in 1974.

The election used the original 10 wards created by the Formation Electoral Arrangements in 1974. Each ward elected one councillor using first-past-the-post voting.

Despite losing two seats, Labour maintained control of the district council, winning six of the 10 seats. The 1977 local elections were the first test for the nationalist Scottish Labour Party (SLP) which had been formed as a breakaway from Labour by South Ayrshire MP Jim Sillars alongside John Robertson and Alex Neil. The SLP achieved its best results in Cumnock and Doon Valley by winning two seats from Labour and taking more than 25% of the popular vote but the party ultimately fared poorly across the country. The Conservatives remained on one seat after losing their seat in Mauchline and gaining Catrine and Sorn. This was the last time the Conservatives would win a seat in the area until the 2017 local elections, 40 years later. The remaining seat was won by an independent candidate.

== Results ==
1977 Cumnock and Doon Valley District Council election result
Party	Seats	Gains	Losses	Net gain/loss	Seats %	Votes %	Votes	+/−
Labour	6	2	4	▼2	60.0	40.1	4,613	▲4.6
SLP	2	2	0	▲2	20.0	24.7	2,845	New
Conservative	1	1	1	Steady	10.0	8.3	954	▼12.4
Independent	1	1	0	▲1	10.0	6.4	732	New
SNP	0	0	0	Steady	0.0	17.3	1,984	New
Independent Labour	0	0	1	▼1	0.0	3.2	373	▼40.6
Total	10						11,501	

== Ward results ==
=== Cumnock Burgh ===
Cumnock Burgh
Party	Candidate	Votes	%
Labour	J. King	912	40.3
SLP	W. Dick	843	37.3
SNP	J. McHardy	506	22.4
Majority		69	3.0
Turnout		2,261	48.3
Registered electors		4,695	
Labour hold			

=== Lugar, Logan and Muirkirk ===
Lugar, Logan and Muirkirk
Party	Candidate	Votes	%
Labour	M. Lochhead	948	66.7
SNP	I. Cole	473	33.3
Majority		475	33.4
Turnout		1,421	42.0
Registered electors		3,389	
Labour hold			

=== Old Cumnock Parish ===
Old Cumnock Parish
Party	Candidate	Votes	%
SLP	W. Pender	543	51.8
Labour	J. Smith	506	48.2
Majority		37	3.6
Turnout		1,049	44.0
Registered electors		2,399	
SLP gain from Labour			

=== Auchinleck ===
Auchinleck
Party	Candidate	Votes	%
Labour	J. Allan	Unopposed	
Registered electors		3,495	
Labour hold			

=== Catrine and Sorn ===
Catrine and Sorn
Party	Candidate	Votes	%
Conservative	J. McInnes	496	36.9
Independent Labour	H. Nisbet	373	27.8
Labour	G. Smith	334	24.9
SLP	E. Standring	140	10.4
Majority		123	9.1
Turnout		1,343	58.5
Registered electors		2,305	
Conservative gain from Labour			

=== New Cumnock ===
New Cumnock
Party	Candidate	Votes	%
Labour	J. Paterson	Unopposed	
Registered electors		3,970	
Labour hold			

=== Dalmellington ===
Dalmellington
Party	Candidate	Votes	%
Independent	A. Johnstone	682	40.9
SLP	J. Stewart	585	35.1
Labour	P. Conway	350	21.0
Independent	R. Hill	50	3.0
Majority		97	5.8
Turnout		1,667	50.4
Registered electors		3,309	
Independent gain from Labour			

=== Patna and Dalrymple ===
Patna and Dalrymple
Party	Candidate	Votes	%
SLP	T. Hainey	734	39.4
Labour	M. Rooney	636	34.1
SNP	G. Guthrie	495	26.5
Majority		98	5.3
Turnout		1,865	59.0
Registered electors		3,178	
SLP gain from Labour			

=== Drongan, Ochiltree, Rankinston and Stair ===
Drongan, Ochiltree, Rankinston and Stair
Party	Candidate	Votes	%
Labour	J. Hodge	Unopposed	
Registered electors		3,797	
Labour gain from Independent Labour			

=== Mauchline ===
Mauchline
Party	Candidate	Votes	%	±%
Labour	D. Shankland	927	48.9	▲0.9
SNP	J. Strawthorn	510	26.9	New
Conservative	J. Downes	458	24.2	▼27.8
Majority		417	22.0	N/A
Turnout		1,895	61.9	▲12.3
Registered electors		3,063		
Labour gain from Conservative		Swing	▲14.3	
