= 1974 Cumnock and Doon Valley District Council election =

Cumnock and Doon Valley District Council election

7 May 1974	1977 →

All 10 seats to Cumnock and Doon Valley District Council 6 seats needed for a majority
- Registered: 33,876
- Turnout: 53.7% (Note: Excludes uncontested wards.)
	First party	Second party	Third party
	Lab	ILab	Con
Party	Labour	Independent Labour	Conservative
Seats won	8	1	1
Popular vote	1,331	1,642	778
Percentage	35.5%	43.7%	20.7%
Council Leader after election
Labour

Elections to Cumnock and Doon Valley District Council were held on 7 May 1974, on the same day as the other Scottish local government elections. This was the first election to the district council following the implementation of the Local Government (Scotland) Act 1973.

The election used 10 wards created by the Formation Electoral Arrangements in 1974. Each ward elected one councillor using first-past-the-post voting.

Labour took control of the council after winning a large majority despite none of their candidates winning a contested seat. Labour were the only party to stand candidates in every seat with eight elected unopposed. The two seats which were contested were won by the Conservatives and an independent Labour candidate. As a result of the large number of uncontested seats, independent Labour won the popular vote.

== Background ==
Prior to 1974, Cumnock (known as Cumnock and Holmhead until 1960) was one of 17 burghs within the County of Ayr. The area was made a burgh of barony by Royal Charter in 1509 before becoming a police burgh with an elected burgh council in 1866. As a small burgh, the burgh council had limited powers which included some control over planning as well as local taxation, building control, housing, lighting and drainage with the rest of the local government responsibility falling to the county council.

Following the recommendations in the Wheatly Report, the old system of counties and burghs – which had resulted in a mishmash of local government areas in which some small burghs had larger populations but far fewer responsibilities than some large burghs and even counties – was to be replaced by a new system of regional and district councils. Cumnock Burgh and the surrounding areas including New Cumnock, Mauchline and Dalmellington was to be placed in Cumnock and Doon Valley district within the Strathclyde region.

== Results ==
1974 Cumnock and Doon Valley District Council election result
Party	Seats	Gains	Losses	Net gain/loss	Seats %	Votes %	Votes	+/−
Labour	8			N/A	80.0	35.5	1,331	N/A
Independent Labour	1			N/A	10.0	43.7	1,642	N/A
Conservative	1			N/A	10.0	20.7	778	N/A
Total	10						3,751	

== Ward results ==
=== Cumnock Burgh ===
Cumnock Burgh
Party	Candidate	Votes	%
Labour	K. McTurk	Unopposed	
Registered electors		4,651	
Labour win (new seat)			

=== Lugar, Logan and Muirkirk ===
Lugar, Logan and Muirkirk
Party	Candidate	Votes	%
Labour	M. Lochhead	Unopposed	
Registered electors		3,363	
Labour win (new seat)			

=== Old Cumnock Parish ===
Old Cumnock Parish
Party	Candidate	Votes	%
Labour	T. McIntyre	Unopposed	
Registered electors		2,426	
Labour win (new seat)			

=== Auchinleck ===
Auchinleck
Party	Candidate	Votes	%
Labour	J. Allan	Unopposed	
Registered electors		3,436	
Labour win (new seat)			

=== Catrine and Sorn ===
Catrine and Sorn
Party	Candidate	Votes	%
Labour	H. Nisbet	Unopposed	
Registered electors		2,307	
Labour win (new seat)			

=== New Cumnock ===
New Cumnock
Party	Candidate	Votes	%
Labour	J. Paterson	Unopposed	
Registered electors		4,088	
Labour win (new seat)			

=== Dalmellington ===
Dalmellington
Party	Candidate	Votes	%
Labour	R. Hill	Unopposed	
Registered electors		3,353	
Labour win (new seat)			

=== Patna and Dalrymple ===
Patna and Dalrymple
Party	Candidate	Votes	%
Labour	M. Rooney	Unopposed	
Registered electors		3,271	
Labour win (new seat)			

=== Drongan, Ochiltree, Rankinston and Stair ===
Drongan, Ochiltree, Rankinston and Stair
Party	Candidate	Votes	%
Independent Labour	J. Hodge	1,642	72.8
Labour	W. Brown	614	27.2
Majority		1,028	45.6
Turnout		2,256	57.5
Registered electors		3,952	
Independent Labour win (new seat)			

=== Mauchline ===
Mauchline
Party	Candidate	Votes	%
Conservative	T. Findlay	778	52.0
Labour	M. Miller	717	48.0
Majority		61	4.0
Turnout		1,495	49.6
Registered electors		3,029	
Conservative win (new seat)			
