= Cumnock West (ward) =

Scottish electoral ward

- East Ayrshire
- Electorate: 2,903 (2003)
- Major settlements: Cumnock
- Scottish Parliament constituency: Carrick, Cumnock and Doon Valley
- Scottish Parliament region: South Scotland
- UK Parliament constituency: Ayr, Carrick and Cumnock

1999–2007
- Number of councillors: 1
- Replaced by: Cumnock and New Cumnock
- Created from: Cumnock East; Cumnock South and Old Cumnock; Cumnock West and Auchinleck

Cumnock West was one of 32 electoral wards of East Ayrshire Council. Created in 1999, the ward elected one councillor using the first-past-the-post voting electoral system.

The ward was a Labour stronghold as the party successfully held the seat at every election.

In 2007, the ward was abolished and replaced by the multi-member Cumnock and New Cumnock ward as council elections moved to a proportional voting system – the single transferable vote – following the implementation of the Local Governance (Scotland) Act 2004.

== Boundaries ==
The Cumnock West ward was created in 1999 by the Third Statutory Reviews of Electoral Arrangements from parts of the Cumnock East, Cumnock South and Old Cumnock and Cumnock West and Auchinleck wards. The ward took in the western part of Cumnock including the neighbourhood of Holmhead. In 2007, the ward was abolished as the Local Governance (Scotland) Act 2004 saw proportional representation and new multi-member wards introduced. The area covered by the Cumnock West ward was placed into the new Cumnock and New Cumnock ward.

== Councillors ==
Election	Councillor
1999	J. Boyd
2003	W. Crawford

== Election results ==
=== 2003 election ===
Cumnock West
Party	Candidate	Votes	%	±%
Labour	William Crawford	839	59.4	▼4.8
SNP	Katherine Smith	303	21.4	▼14.4
Conservative	Gary Smith	141	10.0	New
Scottish Socialist	James Monaghan	130	9.2	New
Majority		536	37.9	▲9.6
Turnout		1,413	48.7	▼11.9
Registered electors		2,903		
Labour hold		Swing	▲4.8	

=== 1999 election ===
Cumnock West
Party	Candidate	Votes	%
Labour	J. Boyd	1,103	64.2
SNP	A. Kent	616	35.8
Majority		487	28.3
Turnout		1,719	60.6
Registered electors		2,927	
Labour win (new seat)			
