= Cumnock West and Auchinleck (ward) =

Scottish electoral ward

- East Ayrshire
- Electorate: 3,281 (1995)
- Major settlements: Auchinleck; Cumnock
- UK Parliament constituency: Carrick, Cumnock and Doon Valley

1984–1999
- Number of councillors: 1
- Replaced by: Auchinleck; Cumnock West; Ochiltree, Skares, Netherthird and Craigens
- Created from: Auchinleck; Cumnock Burgh

Cumnock West and Auchinleck was one of 30 electoral wards of East Ayrshire Council. Originally created in 1984, the ward was initially within Cumnock and Doon Valley District Council before the local government reforms in the 1990s. The ward elected one councillor using the first-past-the-post voting electoral system.

The ward was a Labour stronghold as the party successfully held the seat at every election.

In 1999, the ward was abolished with the area represented by the ward placed into the new Cumnock West and Ochiltree, Skares, Netherthird and Craigens wards and the re-established Auchinleck ward.

== Boundaries ==
The Cumnock West and Auchinleck ward was created for the 1984 local elections by the Initial Statutory Reviews of Electoral Arrangements in 1981 from part of the former Cumnock Burgh and Auchinleck wards. The ward took in the western part of Cumnock, most of Auchinleck and an area to the west of both towns. Following the Second Statutory Reviews of Electoral Arrangements in 1994, the ward's boundaries in Cumnock were altered to transfer part of Holmhead to Cumnock East and minor changes were made to the boundary in the town centre. After the implementation of the Local Government etc. (Scotland) Act 1994, the boundaries proposed by the second review became the Formation Electoral Arrangements for the newly created East Ayrshire Council – an amalgamation of Cumnock and Doon Valley District Council and Kilmarnock and Loudoun District Council. In 1999, the ward was abolished following the Third Statutory Reviews of Electoral Arrangements with the area split between three wards – Auchinleck, Cumnock West and Ochiltree, Skares, Netherthird and Craigens.

== Councillors ==
Election	Councillor
1984	J. Allan
1992	A. Boyd
1995	J. Boyd

== Election results ==
=== 1995 election ===
Cumnock West and Auchinleck
Party	Candidate	Votes	%	±%
Labour	J. Boyd	1,258	79.5	▼6.2
SNP	L. McBride	257	16.2	New
Conservative	B. McAdam	67	4.2	▼9.8
Majority		1,001	63.3	▼8.4
Turnout		1,582	48.2	▲14.2
Registered electors		3,281		
Labour hold		Swing	▼11.2	

=== 1992 election ===
Cumnock West and Auchinleck
Party	Candidate	Votes	%
Labour	A. Boyd	1,126	85.7
Conservative	B. McAdam	184	14.0
Majority		942	71.7
Turnout		1,314	34.0
Registered electors		3,866	
Labour hold			

=== 1988 election ===
Cumnock West and Auchinleck
Party	Candidate	Votes	%
Labour	J. Allan	Unopposed	
Registered electors		3,804	
Labour hold			

=== 1984 election ===
Cumnock West and Auchinleck
Party	Candidate	Votes	%
Labour	J. Allan	1,325	91.2
SDP	J. McHardy	287	8.3
Majority		1,204	82.9
Turnout		1,612	39.1
Registered electors		3,717	
Labour win (new seat)			
