= Cumnock South and Old Cumnock (ward) =

Scottish electoral ward

- East Ayrshire
- Electorate: 3,342 (1995)
- Major settlements: Cumnock
- UK Parliament constituency: Carrick, Cumnock and Doon Valley

1984–1999
- Number of councillors: 1
- Replaced by: Auchinleck; Cumnock East; Cumnock West; Ochiltree, Skares, Netherthird and Craigens
- Created from: Cumnock Burgh; Old Cumnock Parish

Cumnock South and Old Cumnock was one of 30 electoral wards of East Ayrshire Council. Originally created in 1984, the ward was initially within Cumnock and Doon Valley District Council before the local government reforms in the 1990s. The ward elected one councillor using the first-past-the-post voting electoral system.

The ward was a Labour stronghold as the party successfully held the seat at every election. David Sneller was the only councillor elected as he represented the ward from 1984 to 1999.

In 1999, the ward was abolished with the majority of the area represented by the ward was placed into the new Ochiltree, Skares, Netherthird and Craigens ward. The remainder of the ward was split between the Auchinleck, Cumnock East and Cumnock West wards.

== Boundaries ==
The Cumnock South and Old Cumnock ward was created for the 1984 local elections by the Initial Statutory Reviews of Electoral Arrangements in 1981 from the former Cumnock Burgh and Old Cumnock Parish wards. The ward took in the southern part of Cumnock including Netherthird as well as Skares. Minor changes were made to the ward's boundaries in Cumnock town centre following the Second Statutory Reviews of Electoral Arrangements in 1994. After the implementation of the Local Government etc. (Scotland) Act 1994, the boundaries proposed by the second review became the Formation Electoral Arrangements for the newly created East Ayrshire Council – an amalgamation of Cumnock and Doon Valley District Council and Kilmarnock and Loudoun District Council. In 1998, the ward was abolished by the Third Statutory Reviews of Electoral Arrangements. The majority of the area represented by the ward was placed into the new Ochiltree, Skares, Netherthird and Craigens ward. The remainder of the ward was split between the Auchinleck, Cumnock East and Cumnock West wards.

== Councillors ==
Election	Councillor
1984	David Sneller

== Election results ==
=== 1995 election ===
Cumnock South and Old Cumnock
Party	Candidate	Votes	%	±%
Labour	D. Sneller	1,247	75.9	N/A
SNP	K. Cairney	395	24.1	N/A
Majority		852	51.8	N/A
Turnout		1,642	49.1	N/A
Registered electors		3,342		
Labour hold		Swing	N/A	

=== 1992 election ===
Cumnock South and Old Cumnock
Party	Candidate	Votes	%
Labour	David Sneller	Unopposed	
Registered electors		3,379	
Labour hold			

=== 1988 election ===
Cumnock South and Old Cumnock
Party	Candidate	Votes	%
Labour	D. Sneller	Unopposed	
Registered electors		3,489	
Labour hold			

=== 1984 election ===
Cumnock South and Old Cumnock
Party	Candidate	Votes	%
Labour	D. Sneller	Unopposed	
Registered electors		3,540	
Labour win (new seat)			
