= Ochiltree, Skares, Netherthird and Craigens (ward) =

Scottish electoral ward

- East Ayrshire
- Electorate: 2,908 (2003)
- Major settlements: Cumnock; Ochiltree
- Scottish Parliament constituency: Carrick, Cumnock and Doon Valley
- Scottish Parliament region: South Scotland
- UK Parliament constituency: Ayr, Carrick and Cumnock

1999–2007
- Number of councillors: 1
- Replaced by: Cumnock and New Cumnock; Doon Valley
- Created from: Drongan, Ochiltree, Rankinston and Stair; Cumnock South and Old Cumnock; Cumnock West and Auchinleck

Ochiltree, Skares, Netherthird and Craigens was one of 32 electoral wards of East Ayrshire Council. Created in 1999, the ward elected one councillor using the first-past-the-post voting electoral system.

The ward produced strong results for both the Scottish National Party (SNP) and Labour Co-operative who both polled over 40% at every election. The SNP held the seat from 1999 to 2003 and Labour Co-op held the seat from 2003 until 2007.

In 2007, the ward was abolished and replaced by the multi-member Cumnock and New Cumnock ward as council elections moved to a proportional voting system – the single transferable vote – following the implementation of the Local Governance (Scotland) Act 2004.

== Boundaries ==
The Ochiltree, Skares, Netherthird and Craigens ward was created in 1999 by the Third Statutory Reviews of Electoral Arrangements from the previous Drongan, Ochiltree, Rankinston and Stair, Cumnock South and Old Cumnock and Cumnock West and Auchinleck wards. The ward took in a rural area around the villages of Ochiltree and Skares as well as the southern part of Cumnock including the neighbourhoods of Netherthird and Craigens. In 2007, the ward was abolished as the Local Governance (Scotland) Act 2004 saw proportional representation and new multi-member wards introduced. The majority of the area covered by the Ochiltree, Skares, Netherthird and Craigens ward was placed into the new Cumnock and New Cumnock ward and an area in the south of the ward was placed in the Doon Valley ward.

== Councillors ==
Election	Councillor
1999	J. Faulds
2003	W. Menzies

== Election results ==
=== 2003 election ===
Ochiltree, Skares, Netherthird and Craigens
Party	Candidate	Votes	%	±%
Labour Co-op	William Menzies	772	49.2	▲9.0
SNP	Julie Faulds	657	41.8	▼5.8
Conservative	Ian Waller	141	9.0	▼3.2
Majority		115	7.3	N/A
Turnout		1,570	54.0	▼8.3
Registered electors		2,908		
Labour Co-op gain from SNP		Swing	▲7.4	

=== 1999 election ===
Ochiltree, Skares, Netherthird and Craigens
Party	Candidate	Votes	%
SNP	J. Faulds	791	47.6
Labour	D. Sneller	657	40.2
Conservative	A. Stitt	203	12.2
Majority		134	7.3
Turnout		1,651	62.3
Registered electors		2,704	
SNP win (new seat)			
