= Doon Valley (ward) =

Electoral ward of East Ayrshire, Scotland

- East Ayrshire
- Boundary of Doon Valley in East Ayrshire from 2007–2017.
- Population: 11,592 (2021)
- Electorate: 8,763 (2024)
- Major settlements: Dalmellington; Drongan; Patna
- Scottish Parliament constituency: Carrick, Cumnock and Doon Valley
- Scottish Parliament region: South Scotland
- UK Parliament constituency: Ayr, Carrick and Cumnock

Current ward
- Created: 2007
- Number of councillors: 3
- Councillor: Drew Filson (Independent)
- Councillor: Jennifer Hogg (SNP)
- Councillor: Jim Kyle (Labour)
- Created from: Dalmellington; Drongan, Stair and Rankinston; Ochiltree, Skares, Netherthird and Craigens; Patna and Dalrymple

Doon Valley is one of the nine electoral wards of East Ayrshire Council. Created in 2007, the ward elects three councillors using the single transferable vote electoral system and covers an area with a population of 11,592 people.

The area was previously a Labour stronghold with the party holding two of the three seats between 2009 and 2017. However, the ward has since been split between Labour and the Scottish National Party (SNP).

== Boundaries ==
The ward was created following the Fourth Statutory Reviews of Electoral Arrangements ahead of the 2007 Scottish local elections. As a result of the Local Governance (Scotland) Act 2004, local elections in Scotland would use the single transferable vote electoral system from 2007 onwards so Doon Valley was formed from an amalgamation of several previous first-past-the-post wards. It contained all of the former Patna and Dalrymple ward as well as part of the former Drongan, Stair and Rankinston, Dalmellington and Ochiltree, Skares, Netherthird and Craigens wards. Doon Valley includes the southernmost part of the council area between its borders with South Ayrshire and Dumfries and Galloway and takes in the towns of Dalmellington, Patna and Drongan. The River Doon runs north-south through the ward and into Loch Doon which lies in the south of the ward. Following the Fifth Statutory Reviews of Electoral Arrangements ahead of the 2017 Scottish local elections, the ward's boundaries were not changed.

== Councillors ==
Election	Councillors		
2007	Elaine Dinwoodie (Labour)	Drew Filson (SNP)	Jim Sutherland (Ind.)
2009	Elaine Dinwoodie (Labour)	Drew Filson (SNP)	Moira Pirie (Labour)
2012	Elaine Dinwoodie (Labour)	John Bell (SNP)	Moira Pirie (Labour)
2017	Elaine Dinwoodie (Labour)	John Bell (SNP)	Drew Filson (Ind.)
2022	Elaine Stewart (Labour)	Jennifer Hogg (SNP)	Drew Filson (Ind.)
2024	Jim Kyle (Labour)	Jennifer Hogg (SNP)	Drew Filson (Ind.)

== Election results ==
=== 2024 by-election ===
Doon Valley by-election (14 November 2024) – 1 seat
Party	Candidate	FPv%	Count						
Party	Candidate	FPv%	1	2	3	4	5	6	7
Labour	Jim Kyle	32.2	516	516	523	537	569	699	826
Conservative	Tracey Clark	25.5	410	411	412	423	475	506	
SNP	Lorraine Pollock	23.7	379	379	391	400	432		
Independent	Jim Ireland	10.7	172	175	179	195			
Liberal Democrats	Trevor Grant	4.2	68	68	77				
Scottish Green	Korin Matthew Vallance	3.0	48	49					
Independent	Stef McNamara	0.5	9						
Electorate: 8,763 Valid: 1,602 Spoilt: 27 Quota: 802 Turnout: 18.6%

=== 2022 election ===
Doon Valley – 3 seats
Party	Candidate	FPv%	Count					
Party	Candidate	FPv%	1	2	3	4	5	6
Independent	Drew Filson (incumbent)	27.9	1,077					
Labour	Elaine Stewart	23.1	894	929	974			
SNP	Jennifer Hogg	20.8	803	817	826	827	927	1,074
Conservative	Samantha Hainey	16.7	644	651	681	682	780	
Independent	John Bell (incumbent)	8.0	311	333	373	375		
Independent	Murray Hendrie	3.5	137	146				
Electorate: 8,932 Valid: 3,866 Spoilt: 59 Quota: 967 Turnout: 43.9%

=== 2017 election ===
Doon Valley - 3 seats
Party	Candidate	FPv%	Count								
Party	Candidate	FPv%	1	2	3	4	5	6	7	8	9
Labour	Elaine Dinwoodie (incumbent)	21.0	801	801	807	828	848	1,182			
Conservative	Alison Harper	18.3	698	699	701	718	721	737	756	757	
Independent	Drew Filson	15.5	590	590	596	685	693	777	838	844	1,066
SNP	John Bell (incumbent)	15.3	583	583	592	602	935	950	972		
Labour	Elaine Stewart	13.0	496	496	502	522	526				
SNP	Anne Fairlie	9.9	375	375	390	399					
Independent	John Young	5.4	207	208	213						
Scottish Green	Craig Murray	1.4	53	54							
Scottish Libertarian	Mark Mitchell	0.1	4								
Electorate: 8,920 Valid: 3,807 Spoilt: 76 Quota: 952 Turnout: 43.5%

=== 2012 election ===
Doon Valley – 3 seats
Party	Candidate	FPv%	Count					
Party	Candidate	FPv%	1	2	3	4	5	6
Labour	Elaine Dinwoodie (incumbent)	33.1	1,171					
SNP	John Bell	22.3	790	812	832	950		
Independent	Ian Borthwick	13.8	488	501	540	680	708	
Independent	Drew Filson (incumbent)	12.1	427	465	491			
Labour	Moira Pirie (incumbent)	11.9	421	590	613	719	734	984
Conservative	Irene Grant	5.0	178	181				
Electorate: 8,855 Valid: 3,475 Spoilt: 61 Quota: 869 Turnout: 39.2%

=== 2009 by-election ===
Doon Valley by-election, 1 October 2009 – 1 seat
Party	Candidate	FPv%	Count
Party	Candidate	FPv%	1
Labour	Moira Pirrie	50.54	1,221
SNP	John Bell	36.88	891
Conservative	Nicholas Martin	7.28	176
Independent	Yvonne Hamilton	3.48	84
Independent	Robert Shennan	1.82	44
Electorate: 9,144 Valid: 2,416 Spoilt: 33 Quota: 1,209 Turnout: 26.8%

=== 2007 election ===
Doon Valley - 3 seats
Party	Candidate	FPv%	Count				
Party	Candidate	FPv%	1	2	3	4	5
SNP	Drew Filson	26.0	1,221				
Labour	Elaine Stewart	17.4	814	819	838	1,022	
Independent	Jim Sutherland	16.6	779	790	915	1,036	1,089
Labour	Elaine Dinwoodie	16.5	776	780	826	1,097	1,802
Labour	Tommy Farrell	15.1	709	712	734		
Conservative	Margaret Sword	8.4	392	396			
Electorate: 8,976 Valid: 4,691 Spoilt: 96 Quota: 1,173 Turnout: 52.2%
