= Cumnock and New Cumnock (ward) =

Scottish electoral ward

- East Ayrshire
- Boundary of Cumnock and New Cumnock in East Ayrshire from 2007–2017.
- Population: 13,210 (2021)
- Electorate: 11,044 (2022)
- Major settlements: Cumnock; New Cumnock
- Scottish Parliament constituency: Carrick, Cumnock and Doon Valley
- Scottish Parliament region: South Scotland
- UK Parliament constituency: Ayr, Carrick and Cumnock; Kilmarnock and Loudon

Current ward
- Created: 2007
- Number of councillors: 4
- Councillor: Billy Crawford (Labour)
- Councillor: Jim McMahon (SNP)
- Councillor: June Kyle (Labour)
- Councillor: Neill Watts (Conservative)
- Created from: Auchinleck; Cumnock East; Cumnock West; Dalmellington; Drongan, Stair and Rankinston; New Cumnock; Mauchline; Ochiltree, Skares, Netherthird and Craigens

Cumnock and New Cumnock is one of the nine electoral wards of East Ayrshire Council. Created in 2007, the ward elects four councillors using the single transferable vote electoral system and covers an area with a population of 13,210 people.

The area is a Labour stronghold with the party holding three of the four seats between in 2007 and 2017. Support for the party fell in 2017 with only one councillor elected but it recovered in 2022 and the party currently holds half the seats.

== Boundaries ==
The ward was created following the Fourth Statutory Reviews of Electoral Arrangements ahead of the 2007 Scottish local elections. As a result of the Local Governance (Scotland) Act 2004, local elections in Scotland would use the single transferable vote electoral system from 2007 onwards so Cumnock and New Cumnock was formed from an amalgamation of several previous first-past-the-post wards. It contained all of the former Cumnock East, Cumnock West, New Cumnock wards as well as part of the former Ochiltree, Skares, Netherthird and Craigen, Drongan, Stair and Rankinston, Auchinleck, Dalmellington and Mauchline wards. Cumnock and New Cumnock lies in the southeast of the council area next to its border with Dumfries and Galloway and takes in the towns of Cumnock, New Cumnock and Ochiltree. Following the Fifth Statutory Reviews of Electoral Arrangements ahead of the 2017 Scottish local elections, the ward's boundaries were not changed.

== Councillors ==
Election	Councillors			
2007	Billy Crawford (Labour)	Eric Ross (Labour)	Barney Menzies (Labour)	Kathy Morrice (SNP)
2012	Billy Crawford (Labour)	Eric Ross (Labour)	Barney Menzies (Labour)	Kathy Morrice (SNP)
2017	Billy Crawford (Labour)	Walter Young (Conservative)	Jim McMahon (SNP)	Jacqui Todd (SNP)
2022	Billy Crawford (Labour)	Neill Watts (Conservative)	Jim McMahon (SNP)	June Kyle (Labour)

== Election results ==
=== 2022 election ===
Cumnock and New Cumnock – 4 seats
Party	Candidate	FPv%	Count				
Party	Candidate	FPv%	1	2	3	4	5
Labour	Billy Crawford (incumbent)	30.1	1,349				
SNP	Jim McMahon (incumbent)	20.0	897				
Conservative	Neill Watts	18.5	827	847	858	858	915
SNP	Jacqui Todd (incumbent)	15.7	701	714	723	724	752
Labour	June Kyle	13.2	593	961			
Liberal Democrats	Fraser Wright	2.4	109	114	127	127	
Electorate: 11,044 Valid: 4,476 Spoilt: 116 Quota: 896 Turnout: 41.6%

=== 2017 election ===
Cumnock and New Cumnock - 4 seats
Party	Candidate	FPv%	Count						
Party	Candidate	FPv%	1	2	3	4	5	6	7
Labour	Billy Crawford (incumbent)	28.7	1,279						
Conservative	Walter Young	22.2	991						
SNP	Jacqui Todd	16.4	731	740	743	745	773	831	898
SNP	Jim McMahon	14.4	641	656	659	660	684	743	812
Independent	Jessie Owens	8.3	371	390	411	418	461		
Labour	Carol Ann Mochan	6.6	295	577	599	605	626	736	
Scottish Green	Peter Black	2.8	127	136	143	149			
Scottish Libertarian	Gordon Bircham	0.6	27	28	32				
Electorate: 10,735 Valid: 4,462 Spoilt: 137 Quota: 893 Turnout: 42.8%

=== 2012 election ===
Cumnock and New Cumnock – 4 seats
Party	Candidate	FPv%	Count							
Party	Candidate	FPv%	1	2	3	4	5	6	7	8
Labour	Eric Ross (incumbent)	23.8	987							
SNP	Kathy Morrice (incumbent)	21.6	894							
Labour	Barney Menzies (incumbent)	19.5	809	892						
Labour	Billy Crawford (incumbent)	14.8	612	672	677	741	744	763	800	945
Independent	Ian Allan	7.4	308	310	311	314	352	409	475	
Conservative	James Boswell	5.0	206	208	209	210	215			
SNP	Craig Murray	4.3	180	185	253	255	258	286		
Independent	David Fraser	1.4	59	62	63	64				
Electorate: 10,947 Valid: 4,055 Spoilt: 89 Quota: 812 Turnout: 37.0%

=== 2007 election ===
Cumnock and New Cumnock - 4 seats
Party	Candidate	FPv%	Count						
Party	Candidate	FPv%	1	2	3	4	5	6	7
Labour	Eric Ross	24.4	1,297						
Labour	Billy Crawford	18.1	961	1,059	1,088				
Labour	Barney Menzies	17.9	950	1,026	1,049	1,066			
SNP	Kathy Morrice	13.8	733	744	809	810	810	898	1,504
SNP	Andrew Kent	12.4	661	664	696	698	698	815	
Conservative	James Boswell	9.8	519	524	536	536	536		
Solidarity	Jim Monaghan	3.8	200	205					
Electorate: 11,057 Valid: 5,321 Spoilt: 154 Quota: 1,065 Turnout: 48.1%
