= Dalmellington (ward) =

Scottish electoral ward

- East Ayrshire
- Electorate: 3,051 (2003)
- Major settlements: Dalmellington
- Scottish Parliament constituency: Carrick, Cumnock and Doon Valley
- Scottish Parliament region: South Scotland
- UK Parliament constituency: Ayr, Carrick and Cumnock

1974–2007
- Number of councillors: 1
- Replaced by: Doon Valley; Cumnock and New Cumnock

Dalmellington was one of 32 electoral wards of East Ayrshire Council. Originally created in 1974, the ward was initially within Cumnock and Doon Valley District Council before the local government reforms in the 1990s. The ward elected one councillor using the first-past-the-post voting electoral system.

The ward was a Labour stronghold as the party successfully held the seat at every election after gaining it from the Social Democratic Party (SDP) in 1992 until it was abolished. In 1988, Dalmelington was the only ward in Scotland won by the newly formed SDP – a breakaway party from the Social and Liberal Democrats which was formed by a merger of the original Social Democratic Party and the Liberal Party.

In 2007, the ward was abolished and replaced by the multi-member Doon Valley ward as council elections moved to a proportional voting system – the single transferable vote – following the implementation of the Local Governance (Scotland) Act 2004.

== Boundaries ==
The Dalmellington ward was created in 1974 by the Formation Electoral Arrangements from the previous Dalmellington South electoral division of Ayr County Council. The ward centered around the town of Dalmellington and took in the southern part of Cumnock and Doon Valley next to its borders with Kyle and Carrick District Council and Stewartry District Council. The boundaries remained largely unchanged following the Initial Statutory Reviews of Electoral Arrangements in 1981. A review in 1986 into the boundaries between the Cumnock and Doon Valley and Kyle and Carrick district councils saw an area to the south of Dalmellington transferred from Kyle and Carrick to Cumnock and Doon Valley which extended the council area to the boundary with Wigtown District Council and included the whole of Loch Doon within Cumnock and Doon Valley. All of the area transferred was included within the Dalmellington ward. Following the Second Statutory Reviews of Electoral Arrangements in 1994, the ward's eastern boundary was moved west to reduce it in area as a result of the 1986 review. After the implementation of the Local Government etc. (Scotland) Act 1994, the boundaries proposed by the second review became the Formation Electoral Arrangements for the newly created East Ayrshire Council – an amalgamation of Cumnock and Doon Valley District Council and Kilmarnock and Loudoun District Council. In 1998, the Third Statutory Reviews of Electoral Arrangements made minor alterations to the wards northern boundary ahead of the 1999 election. In 2007, the ward was abolished as the Local Governance (Scotland) Act 2004 saw proportional representation and new multi-member wards introduced. The vast majority of the area covered by the Dalmellington ward was placed into the new Doon Valley ward and a small area became part of the Cumnock and New Cumnock ward.

== Councillors ==
Election	Councillor
1974	R. Hill
1977	A. Johnstone
1984	T. Gormanley
1988	M. Ali
1992	H. Hatton
1995	R. Taylor
2003	E. Stewart

== Election results ==
=== 2003 election ===
Dalmellington
Party	Candidate	Votes	%	±%
Labour	Elaine Stewart	789	52.7	▲1.1
SNP	Andrew Filson	645	43.1	▲25.2
Conservative	James Boswell	40	2.7	New
Scottish Socialist	Anne Baker	23	1.5	New
Majority		144	9.6	▼11.5
Turnout		1,497	58.6	▼2.5
Registered electors		2,555		
Labour hold		Swing	▼12.0	

=== 1999 election ===
Dalmellington
Party	Candidate	Votes	%	±%
Labour	R. Taylor	864	51.6	▼33.6
Independent	H. O'Neill	511	30.5	New
SNP	N. Gee	299	17.9	▲3.1
Majority		353	21.1	▼49.3
Turnout		1,674	61.1	▲16.9
Registered electors		2,781		
Labour hold		Swing	▼32.0	

=== 1995 election ===
Dalmellington
Party	Candidate	Votes	%	±%
Labour	R. Taylor	1,127	85.2	▲27.5
SNP	A. Lambert	196	14.8	New
Majority		931	70.4	▲54.9
Turnout		1,323	44.2	▲6.8
Registered electors		2,991		
Labour hold		Swing	▲34.8	

=== 1992 election ===
Dalmellington
Party	Candidate	Votes	%	±%
Labour	H. Hattan	897	57.7	▲27.3
Independent	M. Ali	656	42.2	New
Majority		241	15.5	N/A
Turnout		1,553	51.0	▼14.0
Registered electors		3,050		
Labour gain from SDP		Swing	▲41.9	

=== 1988 election ===
Dalmellington
Party	Candidate	Votes	%	±%
SDP	M. Ali	1,163	56.5	New
Labour	H. Walker	626	30.4	▼21.0
Independent	T. Gormanley	171	8.3	New
SNP	D. Kerr	96	4.7	New
Majority		537	26.1	N/A
Turnout		2,056	65.0	▲16.2
Registered electors		3,166		
SDP gain from Labour		Swing	▲28.2	

At the 1984 election, the Social Democratic Party (SDP) won 48.4% of the vote in Dalmellington. They subsequently merged with the Liberal Party in March 1988 to form the Social and Liberal Democrats. Some members of the SDP opposed the merger and split to form a new Social Democratic Party.

=== 1984 election ===
Dalmellington
Party	Candidate	Votes	%	±%
Labour	T. Gormanley	790	51.4	▲16.8
SDP	W. Steele	744	48.4	New
Majority		46	3.0	N/A
Turnout		1,534	48.8	▲2.4
Registered electors		3,151		
Labour gain from Independent		Swing	▲40.8	

=== 1980 election ===
Dalmellington
Party	Candidate	Votes	%	±%
Independent	A. Johnstone	942	64.8	▲23.9
Labour	A. Gormanley	503	34.6	▲13.6
Majority		439	30.2	▲24.4
Turnout		1,445	46.4	▼4.0
Registered electors		3,134		
Independent hold		Swing	▲29.5	

=== 1977 election ===
Dalmellington
Party	Candidate	Votes	%
Independent	A. Johnstone	682	40.9
SLP	J. Stewart	585	35.1
Labour	P. Conway	350	21.0
Independent	R. Hill	50	3.0
Majority		97	5.8
Turnout		1,667	50.4
Registered electors		3,309	
Independent gain from Labour			

=== 1974 election ===
Dalmellington
Party	Candidate	Votes	%
Labour	R. Hill	Unopposed	
Registered electors		3,353	
Labour win (new seat)			
