= Ballochmyle (ward) =

Electoral ward of East Ayrshire, Scotland

- East Ayrshire
- Boundary of Ballochmyle in East Ayrshire from 2007–2017.
- Population: 13,990 (2021)
- Electorate: 11,193 (2022)
- Major settlements: Auchinleck; Mauchline
- Scottish Parliament constituency: Carrick, Cumnock and Doon Valley; Kilmarnock and Irvine Valley
- Scottish Parliament region: South Scotland
- UK Parliament constituency: Kilmarnock and Loudon

Current ward
- Created: 2007
- Number of councillors: 4
- Councillor: Claire Leitch (SNP)
- Councillor: Linda Holland (Labour)
- Councillor: Alyson Simmons (Conservative)
- Councillor: William Lennox (SNP)
- Created from: Auchinleck; Catrine, Sorn and Mauchline East; Galston East; Mauchline; Muirkirk, Lugar and Logan

Ballochmyle is one of the nine electoral wards of East Ayrshire Council. Created in 2007, the ward elects four councillors using the single transferable vote electoral system and covers an area with a population of 13,990 people.

The area was previously a Labour stronghold with the party winning three of the four seats at the first election in 2007. However, the ward has since moved towards the Scottish National Party (SNP) with the party holding half the seats since 2012.

== Boundaries ==
The ward was created following the Fourth Statutory Reviews of Electoral Arrangements ahead of the 2007 Scottish local elections. As a result of the Local Governance (Scotland) Act 2004, local elections in Scotland would use the single transferable vote electoral system from 2007 onwards so Ballochmyle was formed from an amalgamation of several previous first-past-the-post wards. It contained part of the former Galston East, Mauchline, Catrine, Sorn and Mauchline East and Auchinleck wards as well as all of the former Muirkirk, Lugar and Logan ward. Ballochmyle runs across the council area from its border with South Ayrshire to the easternmost part of the council area between its borders with South Lanarkshire and Dumfries and Galloway and takes in the towns of Mauchline, Catrine, Auchinleck, Sorn and Muirkirk. Following the Fifth Statutory Reviews of Electoral Arrangements ahead of the 2017 Scottish local elections, the ward's northwestern boundary was extended north and west to run along the A77.

== Councillors ==
| Election | Councillors | | | |
|---|---|---|---|---|
| 2007 | Jim Roberts (SNP) | Neil McGhee (Labour) | Eric Jackson (Labour) | Jimmy Kelly (Labour) |
| 2008 by-election | Jim Roberts (SNP) | Neil McGhee (Labour) | David Shaw (Labour) | Jimmy Kelly (Labour) |
| 2012 | Jim Roberts (SNP) | Neil McGhee (Labour) | David Shaw (Labour) | Stephanie Primrose (SNP) |
| 2017 | Jim Roberts (SNP) | Neil McGhee (Labour) | Alyson Simmons (Conservative) | Claire Leitch (SNP) |
| 2022 | William Lennox (SNP) | Linda Holland (Labour) | Alyson Simmons (Conservative) | Claire Leitch (SNP) |

== Election results ==
=== 2022 election ===
Ballochmyle – 4 seats
| Party | Candidate | FPv% | Count | | | | | |
| Party | Candidate | FPv% | 1 | 2 | 3 | 4 | 5 | 6 |
|---|---|---|---|---|---|---|---|---|
| SNP | Claire Leitch (incumbent) | 28.0 | 1,301 | | | | | |
| Labour | Linda Holland | 23.4 | 1,085 | | | | | |
| Conservative | Alyson Simmons (incumbent) | 16.8 | 779 | 781 | 786 | 912 | 914 | 1,112 |
| SNP | William Lennox | 11.7 | 542 | 863 | 869 | 981 | | |
| Independent | David Shaw | 10.9 | 507 | 522 | 532 | | | |
| Labour | Stephen McCarron | 9.3 | 432 | 444 | 565 | 691 | 706 | |
Electorate: 11,193 Valid: 4,646 Spoilt: 100 Quota: 930 Turnout: 42.4%

=== 2017 election ===
Ballochmyle - 4 seats
| Party | Candidate | FPv% | Count | | | | | | |
| Party | Candidate | FPv% | 1 | 2 | 3 | 4 | 5 | 6 | 7 |
|---|---|---|---|---|---|---|---|---|---|
| SNP | Claire Leitch | 20.7 | 971 | | | | | | |
| Conservative | Alyson Simmons | 20.1 | 944 | | | | | | |
| Labour | Neil McGhee (incumbent) | 18.6 | 873 | 875 | 875 | 880 | 1,233 | | |
| SNP | Jim Roberts (incumbent) | 16.8 | 788 | 813 | 813 | 816 | 854 | 895 | 1,107 |
| Independent | David Shaw (incumbent) | 13.2 | 621 | 621 | 622 | 627 | 671 | 734 | |
| Labour | Neil Murray | 10.3 | 483 | 483 | 484 | 485 | | | |
| Scottish Libertarian | Sheraz Shafiq | 0.3 | 15 | 15 | 15 | | | | |
Electorate: 11,270 Valid: 4,695 Spoilt: 138 Quota: 940 Turnout: 42.9%

=== 2012 election ===
Ballochmyle – 4 seats
| Party | Candidate | FPv% | Count | | | | | |
| Party | Candidate | FPv% | 1 | 2 | 3 | 4 | 5 | 6 |
|---|---|---|---|---|---|---|---|---|
| SNP | Jim Roberts (incumbent) | 25.4 | 1,109 | | | | | |
| Labour | Neil McGhee (incumbent) | 23.3 | 1,018 | | | | | |
| Labour | David Shaw (incumbent) | 18.5 | 810 | 827 | 857 | | | |
| Labour | Neil Murray | 11.3 | 496 | 510 | 622 | 628 | 704 | |
| SNP | Stephanie Primrose | 10.6 | 462 | 665 | 670 | 671 | 735 | 869 |
| Conservative | Nick Martin | 8.0 | 348 | 352 | 353 | 354 | | |
Electorate: 10,995 Valid: 4,243 Spoilt: 131 Quota: 849 Turnout: 38.6%

=== 2008 by-election ===
Ballochmyle by-election (11 December 2008) – 1 seat
| Party | Candidate | FPv% | Count | | |
| Party | Candidate | FPv% | 1 | 2 | 3 |
|---|---|---|---|---|---|
| Labour | David Shaw | 47.9 | 1,598 | 1,617 | 1,675 |
| SNP | Roseanne Savage | 33.8 | 1,129 | 1,160 | 1,261 |
| Conservative | Janette MacAlpine | 8.2 | 273 | 290 | 308 |
| Solidarity | Danny Masterton | 7.3 | 243 | 248 | |
| Liberal Democrats | Ian Fraser | 2.8 | 93 | | |
Electorate: 11,527 Valid: 3,336 Spoilt: 29 Quota: 1,669 Turnout: 29.2%

=== 2007 election ===
Ballochmyle - 4 seats
| Party | Candidate | FPv% | Count | | | | | | |
| Party | Candidate | FPv% | 1 | 2 | 3 | 4 | 5 | 6 | 7 |
|---|---|---|---|---|---|---|---|---|---|
| Labour | Eric Jackson | 20.5 | 1,195 | | | | | | |
| SNP | Jim Roberts | 17.7 | 1,032 | 1,033 | 1,083 | 1,169 | | | |
| Labour | Neil McGhee | 16.0 | 931 | 937 | 958 | 990 | 991 | 1,026 | 1,130 |
| Labour | Jimmy Kelly | 15.2 | 883 | 895 | 924 | 976 | 976 | 1,044 | 1,146 |
| SNP | David Shankland | 11.4 | 667 | 668 | 682 | 712 | 715 | 805 | |
| Conservative | Nick Martin | 9.2 | 534 | 535 | 563 | 610 | 610 | | |
| Independent | Gordon Ralton | 5.8 | 340 | 340 | 379 | | | | |
| Green | Brian Brodaley | 4.2 | 245 | 246 | | | | | |
Electorate: 11,192 Valid: 5,827 Spoilt: 182 Quota: 1,166 Turnout: 52.1%
