= Cumnock Burgh (ward) =

Scottish electoral ward

- Cumnock and Doon Valley
- Electorate: 4,854 (1980)
- Major settlements: Cumnock
- UK Parliament constituency: Carrick, Cumnock and Doon Valley

1974–1984
- Number of councillors: 1
- Replaced by: Cumnock East; Cumnock South and Old Cumnock; Cumnock West and Auchinleck

Cumnock Burgh was one of 10 electoral wards of Cumnock and Doon Valley District Council. Created in 1974, the ward elected one councillor using the first-past-the-post voting electoral system.

The ward was a Labour stronghold as the party successfully held the seat at every election since its creation until it was abolished.

In 1984, the ward was abolished and the area covered by it split between three newly created wards – Cumnock East, Cumnock South and Old Cumnock and Cumnock West and Auchinleck.

== Boundaries ==
The Cumnock Burgh ward was created in 1974 by the Formation Electoral Arrangements from the previous Cumnock and Holmhead Burgh. The ward centered on the town of Cumnock and took in an area in the centre of Cumnock and Doon Valley. Following the Initial Statutory Reviews of Electoral Arrangements in 1981 the ward was abolished and replaced by three new wards – Cumnock East, Cumnock South and Old Cumnock and Cumnock West and Auchinleck.

== Councillors ==
Election	Councillor
1974	K. McTurk
1977	J. King

== Election results ==
=== 1980 election ===
Cumnock Burgh
Party	Candidate	Votes	%	±%
Labour	J. King	1,285	61.4	▲21.1
SLP	A. Welsh	793	37.9	▲0.6
Majority		492	23.5	▲20.5
Turnout		2,078	43.1	▼5.2
Registered electors		4,854		
Labour hold		Swing	▲10.8	

=== 1977 election ===
Cumnock Burgh
Party	Candidate	Votes	%
Labour	J. King	912	40.3
SLP	W. Dick	843	37.3
SNP	J. McHardy	506	22.4
Majority		69	3.0
Turnout		2,261	48.3
Registered electors		4,695	
Labour hold			

=== 1974 election ===
Cumnock Burgh
Party	Candidate	Votes	%
Labour	K. McTurk	Unopposed	
Registered electors		4,651	
Labour win (new seat)			
