= Drongan, Ochiltree, Rankinston and Stair (ward) =

Scottish electoral ward

- East Ayrshire
- Electorate: 3,853 (1995)
- Major settlements: Drongan; Ochiltree
- UK Parliament constituency: Carrick, Cumnock and Doon Valley

1974–1999
- Number of councillors: 1
- Replaced by: Drongan, Stair and Rankinston; Ochiltree, Skares, Netherthird and Craigens

Drongan, Ochiltree, Rankinston and Stair was one of 30 electoral wards of East Ayrshire Council. Originally created in 1974, the ward was initially within Cumnock and Doon Valley District Council before the local government reforms in the 1990s. The ward elected one councillor using the first-past-the-post voting electoral system.

The ward was a Labour stronghold as the party successfully held the seat at every election from 1977 until it was abolished.

In 1999, the ward was abolished and replaced by the Drongan, Stair and Rankinston and Ochiltree, Skares, Netherthird and Craigens wards.

== Boundaries ==
The Drongan, Ochiltree, Rankinston and Stair ward was created in 1974 by the Formation Electoral Arrangements from the previous Stair and Ochiltree electoral division and the Littlemill polling district of Ayr County Council. The ward took in a rural area around the villages of Drongan, Ochiltree, Rankinston and Stair and took in an area in the west of Cumnock and Doon Valley next to its border with Kyle and Carrick District Council. The boundaries remained largely unchanged following the Initial Statutory Reviews of Electoral Arrangements in 1981 and the Second Statutory Reviews of Electoral Arrangements in 1994. After the implementation of the Local Government etc. (Scotland) Act 1994, the boundaries proposed by the second review became the Formation Electoral Arrangements for the newly created East Ayrshire Council – an amalgamation of Cumnock and Doon Valley District Council and Kilmarnock and Loudoun District Council. In 1998, the Third Statutory Reviews of Electoral Arrangements abolished the ward and split it between two different wards – Drongan, Stair and Rankinston and Ochiltree, Skares, Netherthird and Craigens – ahead of the 1999 election.

== Councillors ==
Election	Councillor
1974	J. Hodge
1977	J. Hodge
1992	E. Torrance
1995	T. Farrell

== Election results ==
=== 1995 election ===
Drongan, Ochiltree, Rankinston and Stair
Party	Candidate	Votes	%	±%
Labour	T. Farrell	1,517	79.8	▲15.6
SNP	J. Neill	270	14.2	▼10.6
Conservative	M. Castle	113	5.9	▼5.0
Majority		1,247	65.6	▲26.2
Turnout		1,900	49.3	▲7.3
Registered electors		3,853		
Labour hold		Swing	▲13.1	

=== 1992 election ===
Drongan, Ochiltree, Rankinston and Stair
Party	Candidate	Votes	%	±%
Labour	E. Torrance	1,040	64.2	▼24.2
SNP	J. Keirs	402	24.8	▲13.5
Conservative	M. Castle	176	10.9	New
Majority		638	39.4	▼37.7
Turnout		1,618	42.0	▼8.2
Registered electors		3,853		
Labour hold		Swing	▼18.8	

=== 1988 election ===
Drongan, Ochiltree, Rankinston and Stair
Party	Candidate	Votes	%	±%
Labour	J. Hodge	1,694	88.4	▲11.4
SNP	J. McMaster	217	11.3	New
Majority		1,477	77.1	▲10.2
Turnout		1,911	50.2	▼8.1
Registered electors		3,816		
Labour hold		Swing	▲10.7	

=== 1984 election ===
Drongan, Ochiltree, Rankinston and Stair
Party	Candidate	Votes	%
Labour	J. Hodge	1,720	77.0
Conservative	M. Castle	225	10.1
Independent Labour	J. Graham	188	8.4
SDP	J. McMaster	94	4.2
Majority		1,495	66.9
Turnout		2,227	55.3
Registered electors		3,831	
Labour hold			

=== 1980 election ===
Drongan, Ochiltree, Rankinston and Stair
Party	Candidate	Votes	%
Labour	J. Hodge	Unopposed	
Registered electors		3,785	
Labour hold			

=== 1977 election ===
Drongan, Ochiltree, Rankinston and Stair
Party	Candidate	Votes	%
Labour	J. Hodge	Unopposed	
Registered electors		3,797	
Labour gain from Independent Labour			

=== 1974 election ===
Drongan, Ochiltree, Rankinston and Stair
Party	Candidate	Votes	%
Independent Labour	J. Hodge	1,642	72.8
Labour	W. Brown	614	27.2
Majority		1,028	45.6
Turnout		2,256	57.5
Registered electors		3,952	
Independent Labour win (new seat)			
