= Patna and Dalrymple (ward) =

Scottish electoral ward

- East Ayrshire
- Electorate: 3,051 (2003)
- Major settlements: Patna; Dalrymple
- Scottish Parliament constituency: Carrick, Cumnock and Doon Valley
- Scottish Parliament region: South Scotland
- UK Parliament constituency: Ayr, Carrick and Cumnock

1974–2007
- Number of councillors: 1
- Replaced by: Doon Valley

Patna and Dalrymple was one of 32 electoral wards of East Ayrshire Council. Originally created in 1974, the ward was initially within Cumnock and Doon Valley District Council before the local government reforms in the 1990s. The ward elected one councillor using the first-past-the-post voting electoral system.

The ward was a Labour stronghold as the party successfully held the seat at every election after gaining it from independent T. Hainey in 1984 until it was abolished.

In 2007, the ward was abolished and replaced by the multi-member Doon Valley ward as council elections moved to a proportional voting system – the single transferable vote – following the implementation of the Local Governance (Scotland) Act 2004.

== Boundaries ==
The Patna and Dalrymple ward was created in 1974 by the Formation Electoral Arrangements from the previous Dalmellington North and Dalrymple electoral divisions of Ayr County Council excluding the part which lay within the Parish of Ayr. The ward centered around the towns of Patna and Dalrymple and took in the western part of Cumnock and Doon Valley next to its border with Kyle and Carrick District Council. The ward's eastern boundary was moved west closer to Dalrymple when part of Cumnock and Doon Valley district was transferred to Kyle and Carrick following a review of into the Coylton, Dalrymple and Mosshill Industrial Estate areas in 1977. The boundaries then remained largely unchanged following the Initial Statutory Reviews of Electoral Arrangements in 1981 and the Second Statutory Reviews of Electoral Arrangements in 1994. After the implementation of the Local Government etc. (Scotland) Act 1994, the boundaries proposed by the second review became the Formation Electoral Arrangements for the newly created East Ayrshire Council – an amalgamation of Cumnock and Doon Valley District Council and Kilmarnock and Loudoun District Council. In 1998, the Third Statutory Reviews of Electoral Arrangements straightened the boundary to the east of Patna to include an area of farmland ahead of the 1999 election. In 2007, the ward was abolished as the Local Governance (Scotland) Act 2004 saw proportional representation and new multi-member wards introduced. The area covered by the Patna and Dalrymple ward was placed into the new Doon Valley ward.

== Councillors ==
Election	Councillor
1974	M. Rooney
1977	T. Hainey
1980	T. Hainey
1984	T. Hainey
1988	J. Smith
1999	E. Dinwoodie

== Election results ==
=== 2003 election ===
Patna and Dalrymple
Party	Candidate	Votes	%	±%
Labour	Elaine Dinwoodie	1,039	71.5	▲4.3
Conservative	Sophie Brodie	215	14.8	New
SNP	Alexander MacKenzie	200	13.8	▼19.0
Majority		824	56.7	▲22.3
Turnout		1,454	47.7	▼7.0
Registered electors		3,051		
Labour hold		Swing	▲11.6	

=== 1999 election ===
Patna and Dalrymple
Party	Candidate	Votes	%	±%
Labour	E. Dinwoodie	1,095	67.2	▼12.8
SNP	V. Tennant	535	32.8	▲12.8
Majority		560	34.4	▼25.6
Turnout		1,630	54.7	▲14.9
Registered electors		3,066		
Labour hold		Swing	▼12.8	

=== 1995 election ===
Patna and Dalrymple
Party	Candidate	Votes	%	±%
Labour	J. Smith	988	80.0	▼4.7
SNP	V. Tennant	247	20.0	New
Majority		741	60.0	▼9.7
Turnout		1,235	39.8	▲7.8
Registered electors		3,104		
Labour hold		Swing	▼12.3	

=== 1992 election ===
Patna and Dalrymple
Party	Candidate	Votes	%	±%
Labour	J. Smith	877	84.7	▲19.7
Conservative	E. Castle	155	15.0	New
Majority		722	69.7	▲21.8
Turnout		1,032	32.0	▼19.2
Registered electors		3,235		
Labour hold		Swing	▲18.4	

=== 1988 election ===
Patna and Dalrymple
Party	Candidate	Votes	%	±%
Labour	J. Smith	1,040	65.0	▲6.4
Independent	M. T. Frew	273	17.1	New
SNP	J. Bradford	219	13.7	New
Independent	W. Harvey	62	3.9	New
Majority		767	47.9	▲30.5
Turnout		1,594	51.2	▲3.3
Registered electors		3,126		
Labour hold		Swing	▲23.8	

=== 1984 election ===
Patna and Dalrymple
Party	Candidate	Votes	%	±%
Labour	T. Hainey	876	58.6	▲21.0
Independent Labour	J. Freeburn	616	41.2	New
Majority		260	17.4	N/A
Turnout		1,492	47.9	▼5.6
Registered electors		3,122		
Labour gain from Independent		Swing	▲41.6	

=== 1980 election ===
Patna and Dalrymple
Party	Candidate	Votes	%	±%
Independent	T. Hainey	1,029	62.3	New
Labour	M. Rooney	622	37.6	▲3.5
Majority		407	24.7	N/A
Turnout		1,651	53.5	▼5.5
Registered electors		3,089		
Independent gain from SLP		Swing	▲50.8	

=== 1977 election ===
Patna and Dalrymple
Party	Candidate	Votes	%
SLP	T. Hainey	734	39.4
Labour	M. Rooney	636	34.1
SNP	G. Guthrie	495	26.5
Majority		98	5.3
Turnout		1,865	59.0
Registered electors		3,178	
SLP gain from Labour			

=== 1974 election ===
Patna and Dalrymple
Party	Candidate	Votes	%
Labour	M. Rooney	Unopposed	
Registered electors		3,271	
Labour win (new seat)			
