= Elaine Stewart (politician) =

British politician

Elaine Stewart MP
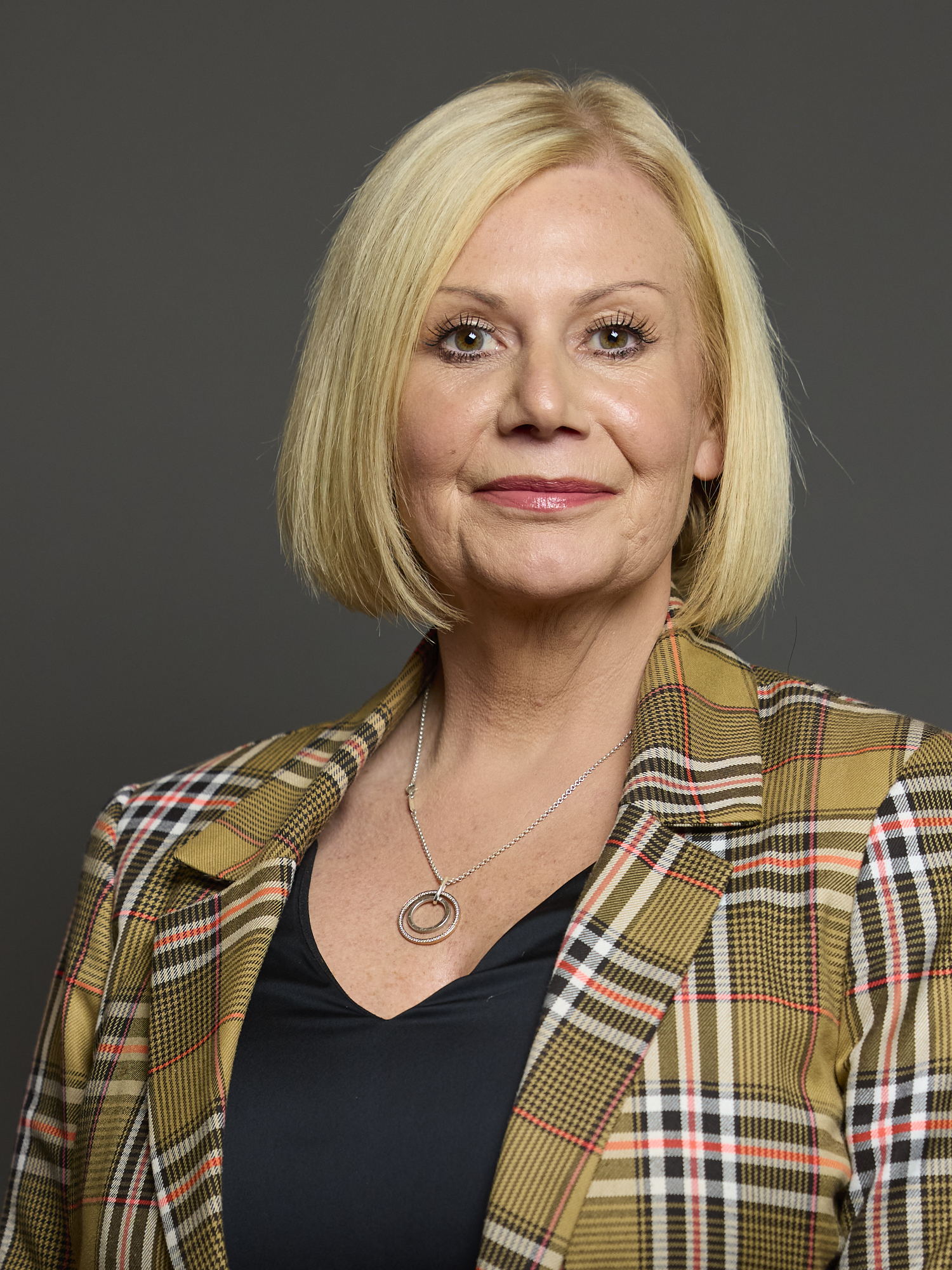
- Official portrait, 2024

Member of Parliament for Ayr, Carrick and Cumnock
- Incumbent
- Assumed office 4 July 2024
- Preceded by: Allan Dorans
- Majority: 4,154 (10.2%)

Personal details
- Party: Labour Party
- Education: University of Stirling (BA)

Elaine Stewart is a Scottish Labour politician who has been the Member of Parliament for Ayr, Carrick and Cumnock since 2024.

== Background ==
The Daily Record noted that Stewart has "more than 30 years' background in community projects within the third sector".

== Member of Parliament ==
A member of the Labour Party, she gained the seat from Allan Dorans, of the Scottish National Party. Stewart was involved in local politics prior to becoming an MP. She contested the Doon Valley ward of East Ayrshire Council in the 2017 local elections but was unsuccessful, being eliminated after the fifth count. She contested the ward again in the 2022 local elections and was elected on the third count. She was nominated for the position of Provost in 2023 but was unsuccessful.

On 20 May 2026, she was appointed Parliamentary Private Secretary to the Department for Work and Pensions.

Parliament of the United Kingdom
Preceded by Allan Dorans	Member of Parliament for Ayr, Carrick and Cumnock; 2024–present	Incumbent
