= Auchinleck (ward) =

Scottish electoral ward

- East Ayrshire
- Electorate: 2,836 (2003)
- Major settlements: Auchinleck
- Scottish Parliament constituency: Carrick, Cumnock and Doon Valley
- Scottish Parliament region: South Scotland
- UK Parliament constituency: Kilmarnock and Loudoun

1974–1984
- Number of councillors: 1
- Replaced by: Catrine, Sorn and North Auchinleck; Cumnock West and Auchinleck

1999–2007
- Number of councillors: 1
- Replaced by: Ballochmyle; Cumnock and New Cumnock
- Created from: Catrine, Sorn and North Auchinleck; Cumnock West and Auchinleck

Auchinleck was one of 32 electoral wards of East Ayrshire Council. Originally created in 1974, the ward was initially within Cumnock and Doon Valley District Council before it was abolished in 1984. Following the local government reforms in the 1990s, the ward was reestablished in 1999 as part of East Ayrshire. The ward elected one councillor using the first-past-the-post voting electoral system.

The ward was a Labour stronghold as the party successfully held the seat at every election.

In 2007, the ward was abolished and replaced by the multi-member Ballochmyle ward as council elections moved to a proportional voting system – the single transferable vote – following the implementation of the Local Governance (Scotland) Act 2004.

== Boundaries ==
The Auchinleck ward was initially created in 1974 by the Formation Electoral Arrangements from the previous Auchinleck North and Auchinleck South electoral divisions excluding the Lugar and Logan polling districts of Ayr County Council. The ward centered around the town of Auchinleck and took in an area in the middle of Cumnock and Doon Valley. Following the Initial Statutory Reviews of Electoral Arrangements in 1981, the ward was abolished and replaced by the Cumnock West and Auchinleck and Catrine, Sorn and North Auchinleck wards. In 1998, the Third Statutory Reviews of Electoral Arrangements reestablished the ward ahead of the 1999 local elections. By this time, local government reforms had taken place and Cumnock and Doon Valley District Council had been merged with Kilmarnock and Loudoun District Council to create East Ayrshire Council. In 2007, the ward was abolished as the Local Governance (Scotland) Act 2004 saw proportional representation and new multi-member wards introduced. The majority of the area covered by the Auchinleck ward was placed into the new Ballochmyle ward and an area south of the town was placed into the Cumnock and New Cumnock ward.

== Councillors ==
Election	Councillor
1974	J. Allan
1984	Abolished
1999	W. Menzies
2003	N. McGhee

== Election results ==
=== 2003 election ===
Auchinleck
Party	Candidate	Votes	%	±%
Labour	Neil McGhee	924	62.9	▲8.5
SNP	Iain Robb	343	23.4	▼22.2
Scottish Socialist	Gareth Jenkins	89	6.1	New
BNP	Stephen Burns	73	5.0	New
Conservative	Primpton Sword	39	2.7	New
Majority		581	39.6	▲30.8
Turnout		1,468	52.6	▼9.7
Registered electors		2,790		
Labour hold		Swing	▲15.3	

=== 1999 election ===
Auchinleck
Party	Candidate	Votes	%
Labour	W. Menzies	983	54.4
SNP	M. Gordan	824	45.6
Majority		159	8.8
Turnout		1,807	62.3
Registered electors		2,955	
Labour win (new seat)			

=== 1980 election ===
Auchinleck
Party	Candidate	Votes	%
Labour	J. Allan	Unopposed	
Registered electors		3,596	
Labour hold			

=== 1977 election ===
Auchinleck
Party	Candidate	Votes	%
Labour	J. Allan	Unopposed	
Registered electors		3,495	
Labour hold			

=== 1974 election ===
Auchinleck
Party	Candidate	Votes	%
Labour	J. Allan	Unopposed	
Registered electors		3,436	
Labour win (new seat)			
