= Muirkirk, Lugar and Logan (ward) =

Scottish electoral ward

- East Ayrshire
- Electorate: 2,544 (2003)
- Major settlements: Muirkirk; Lugar; Logan
- Scottish Parliament constituency: Carrick, Cumnock and Doon Valley
- Scottish Parliament region: South Scotland
- UK Parliament constituency: Kilmarnock and Loudoun

1974–2007
- Number of councillors: 1
- Replaced by: Ballochmyle

Muirkirk, Lugar and Logan was one of 32 electoral wards of East Ayrshire Council. Originally created in 1974 as Lugar, Logan and Muirkirk before being renamed in 1999, the ward was initially within Cumnock and Doon Valley District Council before the local government reforms in the 1990s. The ward elected one councillor using the first-past-the-post voting electoral system.

The ward was a Labour stronghold as the party successfully held the seat from its creation in 1974 until 1988 and from 1992 until it was abolished.

In 2007, the ward was abolished and replaced by the multi-member Ballochmyle ward as council elections moved to a proportional voting system – the single transferable vote – following the implementation of the Local Governance (Scotland) Act 2004.

== Boundaries ==
The Lugar, Logan and Muirkirk ward was created in 1974 by the Formation Electoral Arrangements from the previous Muirkirk electoral division and Lugar and Logan polling districts of Ayr County Council. The ward encompassed a rural area around the villages of Lugar, Logan and Muirkirk in the east of Cumnock and Doon Valley next to its borders with Nithsdale District Council and Clydesdale District Council. The boundaries remained largely unchanged following the Initial Statutory Reviews of Electoral Arrangements in 1981 and the Second Statutory Reviews of Electoral Arrangements in 1994. After the implementation of the Local Government etc. (Scotland) Act 1994, the boundaries proposed by the second review became the Formation Electoral Arrangements for the newly created East Ayrshire Council – an amalgamation of Cumnock and Doon Valley District Council and Kilmarnock and Loudoun District Council. In 1998, the Third Statutory Reviews of Electoral Arrangements made no changes to the existing boundary but the ward was renamed as Muirkirk, Lugar and Logan. In 2007, the ward was abolished as the Local Governance (Scotland) Act 2004 saw proportional representation and new multi-member wards introduced. The area covered by the Muirkirk, Lugar and Logan ward was placed into the new Ballochmyle ward.

== Councillors ==
| Election | Councillor |
|---|---|
| 1974 | M. Lochhead |
| 1980 | J. McGrady |
| 1984 | J. Cannon |
| 1988 | J. Cannon |
| 1992 | J. Kelly |

== Election results ==
=== 2003 election ===
Muirkirk, Lugar and Logan
| Party | Candidate | Votes | % | ±% |
|---|---|---|---|---|
| Labour | James Kelly | 975 | 69.2 | ▼0.5 |
| SNP | Helen Kelso | 269 | 19.1 | ▼11.2 |
| Scottish Socialist | Mark Gilroy | 91 | 6.5 | New |
| Conservative | Peter Smith | 73 | 5.2 | New |
| Majority | | 706 | 50.1 | ▲10.7 |
| Turnout | | 1,408 | 55.3 | ▼10.2 |
| Registered electors | | 2,544 | | |
| Labour hold | | Swing | ▲5.3 | |

=== 1999 election ===
Muirkirk, Lugar and Logan
| Party | Candidate | Votes | % | ±% |
|---|---|---|---|---|
| Labour | J. Kelly | 1,202 | 69.7 | ▼13.4 |
| SNP | H. Kelso | 522 | 30.3 | ▲13.4 |
| Majority | | 680 | 39.4 | ▼26.8 |
| Turnout | | 1,722 | 65.5 | ▲12.6 |
| Registered electors | | 2,721 | | |
| Labour hold | | Swing | ▼13.4 | |

=== 1995 election ===
Lugar, Logan and Muirkirk
| Party | Candidate | Votes | % | ±% |
|---|---|---|---|---|
| Labour | J. Kelly | 1,258 | 83.1 | ▼8.4 |
| SNP | J. Taylor | 256 | 16.9 | New |
| Majority | | 1,002 | 66.2 | ▼17.4 |
| Turnout | | 1,514 | 52.9 | ▲4.6 |
| Registered electors | | 2,861 | | |
| Labour hold | | Swing | ▼12.6 | |

=== 1992 election ===
Lugar, Logan and Muirkirk
| Party | Candidate | Votes | % | ±% |
|---|---|---|---|---|
| Labour | J. Kelly | 1,267 | 91.5 | ▲49.5 |
| Conservative | A. McAdam | 109 | 7.9 | New |
| Majority | | 1,158 | 83.6 | N/A |
| Turnout | | 1,376 | 47.6 | ▼10.7 |
| Registered electors | | 2,905 | | |
| Labour gain from Independent Labour | | Swing | ▲49.0 | |

=== 1988 election ===
Lugar, Logan and Muirkirk
| Party | Candidate | Votes | % | ±% |
|---|---|---|---|---|
| Independent Labour | J. Cannon | 880 | 48.5 | New |
| Labour | N. Valentine | 763 | 42.1 | ▼26.2 |
| SNP | S. Patterson | 167 | 9.2 | New |
| Majority | | 117 | 6.4 | N/A |
| Turnout | | 1,810 | 58.3 | ▲2.8 |
| Registered electors | | 2,905 | | |
| Independent Labour gain from Labour | | Swing | ▲37.3 | |

=== 1984 election ===
Lugar, Logan and Muirkirk
| Party | Candidate | Votes | % |
|---|---|---|---|
| Labour | J. Cannon | 1,248 | 68.3 |
| Independent Labour | W. Murray | 287 | 15.7 |
| Independent Labour | T. Hendry | 237 | 13.0 |
| Independent Labour | J. McGrady | 53 | 2.9 |
| Majority | | 961 | 42.6 |
| Turnout | | 1,825 | 55.3 |
| Registered electors | | 3,292 | |
| Labour hold | | | |

=== 1980 election ===
Lugar, Logan and Muirkirk
| Party | Candidate | Votes | % |
|---|---|---|---|
| Labour | J. McGrady | Unopposed | |
| Registered electors | | 3,367 | |
| Labour hold | | | |

=== 1977 election ===
Lugar, Logan and Muirkirk
| Party | Candidate | Votes | % |
|---|---|---|---|
| Labour | M. Lochhead | 948 | 66.7 |
| SNP | I. Cole | 473 | 33.3 |
| Majority | | 475 | 33.4 |
| Turnout | | 1,421 | 42.0 |
| Registered electors | | 3,389 | |
| Labour hold | | | |

=== 1974 election ===
Lugar, Logan and Muirkirk
| Party | Candidate | Votes | % |
|---|---|---|---|
| Labour | M. Lochhead | Unopposed | |
| Registered electors | | 3,363 | |
| Labour win (new seat) | | | |
