= Mauchline (ward) =

Scottish electoral ward

- East Ayrshire
- Electorate: 2,875 (2003)
- Major settlements: Mauchline
- Scottish Parliament constituency: Carrick, Cumnock and Doon Valley
- Scottish Parliament region: South Scotland
- UK Parliament constituency: Kilmarnock and Loudon

1974–2007
- Number of councillors: 1
- Replaced by: Ballochmyle; Cumnock and New Cumnock

Mauchline was one of 32 electoral wards of East Ayrshire Council. Originally created in 1974, the ward was initially within Cumnock and Doon Valley District Council before the local government reforms in the 1990s. The ward elected one councillor using the first-past-the-post voting electoral system.

The ward was a Labour stronghold as the party successfully held the seat at every election after gaining it from the Conservatives in 1977 until it was abolished.

In 2007, the ward was abolished and replaced by the multi-member Ballochmyle ward as council elections moved to a proportional voting system – the single transferable vote – following the implementation of the Local Governance (Scotland) Act 2004.

== Boundaries ==
The Mauchline ward was created in 1974 by the Formation Electoral Arrangements from the previous Mauchline electoral division of Ayr County Council. The ward centered around the town of Mauchline and took in the northwestern part of Cumnock and Doon Valley between its borders with Kilmarnock and Loudoun District Council and Kyle and Carrick District Council. The boundaries remained largely unchanged following the Initial Statutory Reviews of Electoral Arrangements in 1981 and the Second Statutory Reviews of Electoral Arrangements in 1994. After the implementation of the Local Government etc. (Scotland) Act 1994, the boundaries proposed by the second review became the Formation Electoral Arrangements for the newly created East Ayrshire Council – an amalgamation of Cumnock and Doon Valley District Council and Kilmarnock and Loudoun District Council. In 1998, the Third Statutory Reviews of Electoral Arrangements reduced the area the ward covered as the eastern part of the town between Sorn Road and Welton Road alongside the area covered by Ballochmyle Golf Course was moved to the newly created Catrine, Sorn and Mauchline East ward ahead of the 1999 election. In 2007, the ward was abolished as the Local Governance (Scotland) Act 2004 saw proportional representation and new multi-member wards introduced. The majority of the area covered by the Mauchline ward was placed into the new Ballochmyle ward and an area south of the town was placed in the Cumnock and New Cumnock ward.

== Councillors ==
Election	Councillor
1974	T. Findlay
1977	D. Shankland
1988	E. Rowe
1995	E. Jackson

== Election results ==
=== 2003 election ===
Mauchline
Party	Candidate	Votes	%	±%
Labour	Eric Jackson	867	53.3	▲2.1
SNP	David Shankland	455	28.3	▼2.9
Conservative	Martin Nicholas	297	18.5	▲0.9
Majority		402	25.0	▲5.0
Turnout		1,609	56.0	▲4.6
Registered electors		2,875		
Labour hold		Swing	▲2.5	

=== 1999 election ===
Mauchline
Party	Candidate	Votes	%	±%
Labour	E. Jackson	1,013	51.2	▼9.3
SNP	R. Clark	618	31.2	▲3.1
Conservative	G. Smith	348	17.6	▲6.1
Majority		395	20.0	▼12.4
Turnout		1,979	51.4	▼5.4
Registered electors		2,875		
Labour hold		Swing	▼6.2	

=== 1995 election ===
Mauchline
Party	Candidate	Votes	%	±%
Labour	E. Jackson	1,261	60.5	▲13.5
SNP	R. McLean	586	28.1	New
Conservative	J. Borland	239	11.5	▼12.9
Majority		675	32.4	▲13.7
Turnout		2,086	56.8	▲4.9
Registered electors		3,675		
Labour hold		Swing	▲20.9	

=== 1992 election ===
Mauchline
Party	Candidate	Votes	%	±%
Labour	E. Rowe	887	47.0	▼5.2
Independent Labour	D. Shankland	534	28.3	▲2.9
Conservative	J. Burgess	461	24.4	▲2.4
Majority		353	18.7	▼8.1
Turnout		3,639	56.8	▲4.9
Registered electors		3,675		
Labour hold		Swing	▼4.0	

=== 1988 election ===
Mauchline
Party	Candidate	Votes	%
Labour	E. Rowe	1,067	52.2
Independent Labour	D. Shankland	519	25.4
Conservative	J. Borland	449	22.0
Majority		548	26.8
Turnout		2,035	58.1
Registered electors		3,518	
Labour hold			

=== 1984 election ===
Mauchline
Party	Candidate	Votes	%
Labour	D. Shankland	Unopposed	
Registered electors		3,249	
Labour hold			

=== 1980 election ===
Mauchline
Party	Candidate	Votes	%
Labour	D. Shankland	Unopposed	
Registered electors		3,249	
Labour hold			

=== 1977 election ===
Mauchline
Party	Candidate	Votes	%	±%
Labour	D. Shankland	927	48.9	▲0.9
SNP	J. Strawthorn	510	26.9	New
Conservative	J. Downes	458	24.2	▼27.8
Majority		417	22.0	N/A
Turnout		1,895	61.9	▲12.3
Registered electors		3,063		
Labour gain from Conservative		Swing	▲14.3	

=== 1974 election ===
Mauchline
Party	Candidate	Votes	%
Conservative	T. Findlay	778	52.0
Labour	M. Miller	717	48.0
Majority		61	4.0
Turnout		1,495	49.6
Registered electors		3,029	
Conservative win (new seat)			
