= New Cumnock (ward) =

Scottish electoral ward

- East Ayrshire
- Electorate: 2,836 (2003)
- Major settlements: New Cumnock
- Scottish Parliament constituency: Carrick, Cumnock and Doon Valley
- Scottish Parliament region: South Scotland
- UK Parliament constituency: Ayr, Carrick and Cumnock

1974–2007
- Number of councillors: 1
- Replaced by: Cumnock and New Cumnock

New Cumnock was one of 32 electoral wards of East Ayrshire Council. Originally created in 1974, the ward was initially within Cumnock and Doon Valley District Council before the local government reforms in the 1990s. The ward elected one councillor using the first-past-the-post voting electoral system.

The ward was a Labour stronghold as the party successfully held the seat at every election from its creation in 1974 until it was abolished.

In 2007, the ward was abolished and replaced by the multi-member Cumnock and New Cumnock ward as council elections moved to a proportional voting system – the single transferable vote – following the implementation of the Local Governance (Scotland) Act 2004.

== Boundaries ==
The New Cumnock ward was created in 1974 by the Formation Electoral Arrangements from the previous New Cumnock North and New Cumnock South electoral divisions of Ayr County Council. The ward centered around the town of New Cumnock and took in the southeastern part of Cumnock and Doon Valley next to its borders with Nithsdale District Council and Stewartry District Council. The boundaries remained largely unchanged following the Initial Statutory Reviews of Electoral Arrangements in 1981 and the Second Statutory Reviews of Electoral Arrangements in 1994. After the implementation of the Local Government etc. (Scotland) Act 1994, the boundaries proposed by the second review became the Formation Electoral Arrangements for the newly created East Ayrshire Council – an amalgamation of Cumnock and Doon Valley District Council and Kilmarnock and Loudoun District Council. In 1998, the Third Statutory Reviews of Electoral Arrangements made minor alterations to the ward's western boundary ahead of the 1999 election. In 2007, the ward was abolished as the Local Governance (Scotland) Act 2004 saw proportional representation and new multi-member wards introduced. The area covered by the New Cumnock ward was placed into the new Cumnock and New Cumnock ward.

== Councillors ==
Election	Councillor
1974	J. Paterson
1988	G. Alexander
1995	J. Carmichael

== Election results ==
=== 2003 election ===
New Cumnock
Party	Candidate	Votes	%	±%
Labour	James Carmichael	1,004	67.7	▲6.2
SNP	Michael Lopez	314	21.2	▲4.3
Conservative	Walter Young	165	11.1	New
Majority		690	46.5	▲25.4
Turnout		1,483	52.3	▼8.8
Registered electors		2,836		
Labour hold		Swing	▲0.9	

=== 1999 election ===
New Cumnock
Party	Candidate	Votes	%	±%
Labour	J. Carmichael	1,102	61.5	▼23.7
SNP	J. Kelso	456	25.4	▲14.4
Conservative	W. Young	235	13.1	▲9.3
Majority		646	36.1	▼38.2
Turnout		1,793	58.6	▲13.7
Registered electors		3,105		
Labour hold		Swing	▼19.0	

=== 1995 election ===
New Cumnock
Party	Candidate	Votes	%	±%
Labour	J. Carmicheal	1,282	85.2	▲8.2
SNP	W. Buntain	165	11.0	▲6.9
Conservative	A. McAdam	57	3.8	▼15.0
Majority		1,117	74.2	▲16.0
Turnout		1,504	44.9	▲11.3
Registered electors		3,351		
Labour hold		Swing	▲11.6	

=== 1992 election ===
New Cumnock
Party	Candidate	Votes	%	±%
Labour	G. Alexander	884	77.0	▼12.6
Conservative	J. Boswell	216	18.8	New
SNP	A. Montgomery	47	4.1	▼6.2
Majority		668	59.2	▼20.1
Turnout		1,147	33.6	▼13.0
Registered electors		3,420		
Labour hold		Swing	▼3.2	

=== 1988 election ===
New Cumnock
Party	Candidate	Votes	%
Labour	G. Alexander	1,517	89.6
SNP	I. Hamilton	175	10.3
Majority		1,342	79.3
Turnout		1,692	46.6
Registered electors		3,633	
Labour hold			

=== 1984 election ===
New Cumnock
Party	Candidate	Votes	%
Labour	J. Paterson	Unopposed	
Registered electors		3,829	
Labour hold			

=== 1980 election ===
New Cumnock
Party	Candidate	Votes	%
Labour	J. Paterson	Unopposed	
Registered electors		3,916	
Labour hold			

=== 1977 election ===
New Cumnock
Party	Candidate	Votes	%
Labour	J. Paterson	Unopposed	
Registered electors		3,970	
Labour hold			

=== 1974 election ===
New Cumnock
Party	Candidate	Votes	%
Labour	J. Paterson	Unopposed	
Registered electors		4,088	
Labour win (new seat)			
