= Cumnock East (ward) =

Scottish electoral ward

- East Ayrshire
- Electorate: 2,650 (2003)
- Major settlements: Cumnock
- Scottish Parliament constituency: Carrick, Cumnock and Doon Valley
- Scottish Parliament region: South Scotland
- UK Parliament constituency: Ayr, Carrick and Cumnock

1984–2007
- Number of councillors: 1
- Replaced by: Cumnock and New Cumnock
- Created from: Cumnock Burgh

Cumnock East was one of 32 electoral wards of East Ayrshire Council. Originally created in 1984, the ward was initially within Cumnock and Doon Valley District Council before the local government reforms in the 1990s. The ward elected one councillor using the first-past-the-post voting electoral system.

The ward was a Labour stronghold as the party successfully held the seat at every election. Eric Ross was the only councillor elected as he represented the ward from 1984 to 2007.

In 2007, the ward was abolished and replaced by the multi-member Cumnock and New Cumnock ward as council elections moved to a proportional voting system – the single transferable vote – following the implementation of the Local Governance (Scotland) Act 2004.

== Boundaries ==
The Cumnock East ward was created for the 1984 local elections by the Initial Statutory Reviews of Electoral Arrangements in 1981 from part of the former Cumnock Burgh ward. The ward took in the eastern part of Cumnock. Following the Second Statutory Reviews of Electoral Arrangements in 1994, the ward's northern boundary was moved north to take in more of Holmhead. After the implementation of the Local Government etc. (Scotland) Act 1994, the boundaries proposed by the second review became the Formation Electoral Arrangements for the newly created East Ayrshire Council – an amalgamation of Cumnock and Doon Valley District Council and Kilmarnock and Loudoun District Council. In 1998, the Third Statutory Reviews of Electoral Arrangements mostly re-established the ward's original boundaries. The only change was to the southern boundary which included part of Wylie Crescent. In 2007, the ward was abolished as the Local Governance (Scotland) Act 2004 saw proportional representation and new multi-member wards introduced. The area covered by the Cumnock East ward was placed into the new Cumnock and New Cumnock ward.

== Councillors ==
Election	Councillor
1984	Eric Ross

== Election results ==
=== 2003 election ===
Cumnock East
Party	Candidate	Votes	%	±%
Labour	Eric Ross	961	78.4	▲8.2
SNP	James Kelso	215	17.5	▼12.3
Conservative	Craig Allison	50	4.1	New
Majority		746	60.8	▲20.4
Turnout		1,226	46.3	▼10.6
Registered electors		2,650		
Labour hold		Swing	▲13.2	

=== 1999 election ===
Cumnock East
Party	Candidate	Votes	%	±%
Labour	E. Ross	1,227	70.2	▼10.8
SNP	A. Milligan	520	29.8	▲10.8
Majority		707	40.4	▼21.6
Turnout		1,747	56.9	▲13.7
Registered electors		3,066		
Labour hold		Swing	▼10.8	

=== 1995 election ===
Cumnock East
Party	Candidate	Votes	%	±%
Labour	E. Ross	1,209	81.0	N/A
SNP	J. Maxwell	284	19.0	N/A
Majority		925	62.0	N/A
Turnout		1,493	46.2	N/A
Registered electors		3,235		
Labour hold		Swing	N/A	

=== 1992 election ===
Cumnock East
Party	Candidate	Votes	%
Labour	Eric Ross	Unopposed	
Registered electors		2,677	
Labour hold			

=== 1988 election ===
Cumnock East
Party	Candidate	Votes	%
Labour	Eric Ross	Unopposed	
Registered electors		2,756	
Labour hold			

=== 1984 election ===
Cumnock East
Party	Candidate	Votes	%
Labour	Eric Ross	Unopposed	
Registered electors		2,717	
Labour win (new seat)			
