= Cumnock and Doon Valley =

Local government district in Scotland

Coordinates: 55.466°N 4.451°W

- Cumnock and Doon Valley district within Scotland
- History
  - Created: 16 May 1975
  - Abolished: 31 March 1996
  - Succeeded by: East Ayrshire
- Status: District
- Government: Cumnock and Doon Valley District Council
  - HQ: Lugar

Cumnock and Doon Valley (Scottish Gaelic: Cumnag agus Srath Dhùin) was one of nineteen local government districts in the Strathclyde region of Scotland from 1975 to 1996.

== History ==
The district was created in 1975 under the Local Government (Scotland) Act 1973, which established a two-tier structure of local government across Scotland comprising upper-tier regions and lower-tier districts. Cumnock and Doon Valley was one of nineteen districts created within the region of Strathclyde. The district covered the whole area of two former districts and most of a third from the historic county of Ayrshire, which were all abolished at the same time:

- Cumnock and Holmhead Burgh
- Cumnock District
- Dalmellington District, except Coylton and the part of the parish of Ayr within that district

The district was abolished in 1996 by the Local Government etc. (Scotland) Act 1994, which replaced the regions and districts with unitary council areas. The district's area was combined with that of Kilmarnock and Loudoun to form the East Ayrshire council area.

== Political control ==
The first election to the district council was held in 1974, initially operating as a shadow authority alongside the outgoing authorities until it came into its powers on 16 May 1975. Throughout the council's existence the Labour Party held a majority of the seats on the council:

Party in control	Years
Labour	1975–1996

== Premises ==
The district council's headquarters were at Lugar, 1.5 miles (2.4 km) north-east of Cumnock, the area's largest town. The council's offices were at the former Lugar Ironworks on Peesweep Brae, which had been converted to become the offices and workshops of the National Coal Board some years earlier. After the district's abolition in 1996 the building at Lugar served as secondary offices for East Ayrshire Council before being demolished around 2013.

== See also ==
- Carrick, Cumnock and Doon Valley (Scottish Parliament constituency)
- Carrick, Cumnock and Doon Valley (UK Parliament constituency)
- River Doon
- Subdivisions of Scotland
