= East Ayrshire Council elections =

Local government elections in East Ayrshire, Scotland

East Ayrshire Council in Scotland holds elections every five years, previously holding them every four years from its creation as a single-tier authority in 1995 to 2007.

== Council elections ==
Year	SNP	Labour	Conservative	Rubbish	Independent
1995	8	22	0	0	0
1999 (Note: New ward boundaries.)	14	17	1	0	0
2003	8	23	1	0	0
2007 (Note: Change to single transferable vote system and new ward boundaries.)	14	14	3	0	1
2012	15	14	2	0	1
2017 (Note: New ward boundaries.)	14	9	6	1	2
2022	14	10	4	1	3

== Results maps ==
1999 results map

2003 results map

2012 results map

2017 results map

2022 results map

== By-elections ==
=== 2003-2007 ===
Altonhill, Hillhead and Longpark By-Election 18 May 2006
Party	Candidate	Votes	%	±%
SNP	Helen Coffey	715	59.0	+4.4
Labour	Matthew McLaughlin	296	24.4	−6.8
Conservative	James Adams	178	14.7	+6.1
Scottish Socialist	Colin Rutherford	23	1.9	−3.6
Majority		419	34.6	
Turnout		1,212		
SNP hold		Swing		

=== 2007-2012 ===
Ballochmyle By-Election 11 December 2008
Party	Candidate	FPv%	Count		
Party	Candidate	FPv%	1	2	3
Labour	David Shaw	47.9	1,598	1,617	1,675
SNP	Roseanne Savage	33.8	1,129	1,160	1,261
Conservative	Janette MacAlpine	8.2	273	290	308
Solidarity	Danny Masterton	7.3	243	248	
Liberal Democrats	Ian Fraser	2.8	93		
Labour hold					
Valid: 3,336 Spoilt: 29 Quota: 1,669 Turnout: 3,365

Doon Valley By-Election 1 October 2009
Party	Candidate	FPv%	Count
Party	Candidate	FPv%	1
Labour	Moira Pirrie	50.5	1,221
SNP	John Bell	36.9	891
Conservative	Nicholas Martin	7.3	176
Independent	Yvonne Hamilton	3.5	84
Independent	Robert Shennan	1.8	44
Labour gain from Independent			
Valid: 2,416 Spoilt: 33 Quota: 1,209 Turnout: 2,449

=== 2012–2017 ===
Kilmarnock North By-Election 27 March 2014
Party	Candidate	FPv%	Count			
Party	Candidate	FPv%	1	2	3	4
SNP	Elaine Cowan	44.2	1,334	1,358	1,473	2,042
Labour	Scott Thomson	37.4	1,130	1,147	1,320	
Conservative	Ian Grant	16.3	493	501		
Green	Robin Tatler	2.0	61			
SNP hold						
Valid: 3,018 Spoilt: 19 Quota: 1,510 Turnout: 3,037

Irvine Valley By-Election 1 October 2015
Party	Candidate	FPv%	Count	
Party	Candidate	FPv%	1	2
SNP	Elena Whitham	49.8	1,797	1,832
Conservative	Susan McFadzean	24.5	865	884
Labour	Alex Walsh	23.8	860	884
Green	Jen Broadhurst	2.4	88	
SNP hold				
Valid: 3,610 Spoilt: 42 Quota: 1,805 Turnout: 3,652

Kilmarnock East and Hurlford By-Election 26 January 2017
Party	Candidate	FPv%	Count		
Party	Candidate	FPv%	1	2	3
SNP	Fiona Campbell	48.7	1,461	1,471	1,531
Labour	Dave Meechem	29.4	881	893	1,122
Conservative	Jon Herd	20.1	602	608	
Scottish Libertarian	Stephen McNamara	1.8	53		
SNP hold					
Valid: 2,997 Spoilt: 33 Quota: 1,449 Turnout: 3,030

=== 2022-2027 ===
Doon Valley by-election (14 November 2024) – 1 seat
Party	Candidate	FPv%	Count						
Party	Candidate	FPv%	1	2	3	4	5	6	7
Labour	Jim Kyle	32.2	516	516	523	537	569	699	826
Conservative	Tracey Clark	25.5	410	411	412	423	475	506	
SNP	Lorraine Pollock	23.7	379	379	391	400	432		
Independent	Jim Ireland	10.7	172	175	179	195			
Liberal Democrats	Trevor Grant	4.2	68	68	77				
Green	Korin Matthew Vallance	3.0	48	49					
Independent	Stef McNamara	0.5	9						
Electorate: 8,763 Valid: 1,602 Spoilt: 27 Quota: 802 Turnout: 18.6%

Kilmarnock West and Crosshouse by-election (14 November 2024) – 1 seat
Party	Candidate	FPv%	Count				
Party	Candidate	FPv%	1	2	3	4	5
Labour	Jayne Sangster	39.4	1,213	1,225	1,276	1,468	1,935
SNP	Marie Robertson	33.3	1,025	1,032	1,060	1,127	
Conservative	Allan MacDonald	20.2	623	635	675		
Liberal Democrats	Lee Manley	4.7	145	162			
Independent	Stephen McNamara	2.4	75				
Electorate: 13,260 Valid: 3,081 Spoilt: 28 Quota: 1,541 Turnout: 23.4%

Kilmarnock North by-election (20 February 2025) – 1 seat
Party	Candidate	FPv%	Count							
Party	Candidate	FPv%	1	2	3	4	5	6	7	8
SNP	Caroline Barton	35.7	748	748	751	778	788	809	867	1,067
Labour	Greg MacKenzie	27.8	582	582	592	612	648	673	764	
Independent	Ian Grant	13.2	277	277	286	294	326	395		
Reform	Sandra Kirkwood	10.1	212	212	213	215	241			
Conservative	Allan MacDonald	7.6	159	159	163	167				
Green	Finlay Affleck	2.5	75	76	78					
Liberal Democrats	Lee Manley	1.7	37	37						
Independent	Stephen McNamara	0.1	2							
Electorate: 9,726 Valid: 2,092 Spoilt: 18 Quota: 1,047 Turnout: 21.7%
