= Irvine Valley (ward) =

Electoral ward of East Ayrshire, Scotland

- East Ayrshire
- Boundary of Irvine Valley in East Ayrshire from 2007–2017.
- Population: 12,129 (2021)
- Electorate: 9,797 (2022)
- Major settlements: Darvel; Galston; Newmilns
- Scottish Parliament constituency: Kilmarnock and Irvine Valley
- Scottish Parliament region: South Scotland
- UK Parliament constituency: Kilmarnock and Loudon

Current ward
- Created: 2007
- Number of councillors: 3
- Councillor: Beverley Michele Clark (SNP)
- Councillor: Kevin McGregor (Labour)
- Councillor: Sally Cogley (Rubbish)
- Created from: Crookedholm, Moscow, Galston West and Hurlford North; Darvel; Galston East; Hurlford; Kilmaurs and Stewarton South; Mauchline; Newmilns; North Kilmarnock, Fenwick and Waterside; Stewarton East and Dunlop

Irvine Valley is one of the nine electoral wards of East Ayrshire Council. Created in 2007, the ward elects three councillors using the single transferable vote electoral system. Originally a four-member ward, Irvine Valley was reduced in size following a boundary review and has elected three councillors since the 2017 East Ayrshire Council election.

As a four-member ward, the area favoured the Scottish National Party (SNP) but since the boundary changes in 2017, the ward has been split between the SNP, Labour and The Rubbish Party.

== Boundaries ==
The ward was created following the Fourth Statutory Reviews of Electoral Arrangements ahead of the 2007 Scottish local elections. As a result of the Local Governance (Scotland) Act 2004, local elections in Scotland would use the single transferable vote electoral system from 2007 onwards so Irvine Valley was formed from an amalgamation of several previous first-past-the-post wards.

It contained part of the former Stewarton East and Dunlop, Kilmaurs and Stewarton South, North Kilmarnock, Fenwick and Waterside, Crookedholm, Moscow, Galston West and Hurlford North, Galston East, Mauchline and Hurlford wards as well as all of the former Darvel and Newmilns wards and initially elected four members. Irvine Valley lies in the northeast of the council area and took in the towns of Newmilns, Darvel, Galston, Fenwick, Moscow and Waterside.

The original ward boundaries stretched from the council area's boundary with South Ayrshire in the west to its boundaries with East Renfrewshire and South Lanarkshire in the east. Following the Fifth Statutory Reviews of Electoral Arrangements ahead of the 2017 Scottish local elections, the ward was reduced in size to elect three members. The towns of Fenwick, Moscow and Waterside to the east of the A77 became part of the Annick ward while the area surrounding the A76 up to the council's boundary with South Ayrshire became part of the Ballochmyle ward.

== Councillors ==
Election	Councillors			
2007	Alan Brown (SNP)	Stuart Finlayson (Labour)	Stephanie Young (Conservative)	Bobby McDill (SNP)
2012	Alan Brown (SNP)	George Mair (Labour)	John McFadzean (Conservative)	Bobby McDill (SNP)
2015 by-election	Elena Whitham (SNP)	George Mair (Labour)	John McFadzean (Conservative)	Bobby McDill (SNP)
2017	Elena Whitham (SNP)	George Mair (Labour)	Sally Cogley (Rubbish)	
2022	Beverley Michele Clark (SNP)	Kevin McGregor (Labour)	Sally Cogley (Rubbish)	

== Election results ==
=== 2022 election ===
Irvine Valley – 3 seats
Party	Candidate	FPv%	Count				
Party	Candidate	FPv%	1	2	3	4	5
SNP	Beverley Michele Clark	30.8	1,309				
Labour	Kevin McGregor	22.6	962	974	1,153		
Rubbish	Sally Cogley (incumbent)	18.5	787	801	982	1,017	1,547
Conservative	Susan McFadzean	17.3	737	739	763	782	
SNP	Lee-Anne Margaret To	10.8	461	667			
Electorate: 9,797 Valid: 4,256 Spoilt: 46 Quota: 1,065 Turnout: 43.9%

=== 2017 election ===
Irvine Valley - 3 seats
Party	Candidate	FPv%	Count						
Party	Candidate	FPv%	1	2	3	4	5	6	7
SNP	Elena Whitham (incumbent)	24.4	1,128	1,131	1,132	1,179			
Conservative	Susan McFadzean	19.9	920	921	922	964	964	989	
Rubbish	Sally Cogley	16.9	784	788	792	888	889	1,036	1,403
Labour	George Mair (incumbent)	16.8	775	778	780	879	880	991	1,233
SNP	Margaret Young	11.9	551	551	551	587	605		
Independent	Ian King	9.5	438	438	444				
Independent	David Gartland	0.3	16	16					
Scottish Libertarian	Stevie Brannagan	0.3	14						
Electorate: 9,677 Valid: 4,626 Spoilt: 71 Quota: 1,157 Turnout: 48.5%

=== 2015 by-election ===
Irvine Valley by-election (1 October 2015) – 1 seat
Party	Candidate	FPv%	Count	
Party	Candidate	FPv%	1	2
SNP	Elena Whitham	49.8	1,797	1,832
Conservative	Susan McFadzean	24.5	865	884
Labour	Alex Walsh	23.8	860	884
Scottish Green	Jen Broadhurst	2.4	88	
Electorate: 11,570 Valid: 3,610 Spoilt: 42 Quota: 1,805 Turnout: 31.2%

=== 2012 election ===
Irvine Valley – 4 seats
Party	Candidate	FPv%	Count				
Party	Candidate	FPv%	1	2	3	4	5
Labour	George Mair	29.7	1,423				
SNP	Alan Brown (incumbent) (Note: Irvine Valley councillor Alan Brown was elected as MP for Kilmarnock and Loudoun on 7 May 2015. He resigned his council seat on 17 July 2015 and a by-election was held on 1 October 2015.)	26.1	1,252				
Conservative	John McFadzean	17.9	857	896	940	942	1,188
SNP	Bobby McDill (incumbent)	17.7	847	961			
Independent	May Anderson	7.1	339	451	541	547	
Electorate: 11,401 Valid: 4,718 Spoilt: 72 Quota: 944 Turnout: 41.4%

=== 2007 election ===
Irvine Valley - 4 seats
Party	Candidate	FPv%	Count	
Party	Candidate	FPv%	1	2
SNP	Alan Brown	23.7	1,497	
Labour	Stuart Finlayson	22.4	1,416	
Conservative	Stephanie Young	20.5	1,293	
SNP	Bobby McDill	19.8	1,251	1,421
Labour	Isabella MacRae	9.2	580	592
Independent	May Anderson	4.3	274	286
Electorate: 11,324 Valid: 6,311 Spoilt: 135 Quota: 1,263 Turnout: 55.7%
