= Kilmarnock and Irvine Valley =

Region or constituency of the Scottish Parliament

- County constituency for the Scottish Parliament
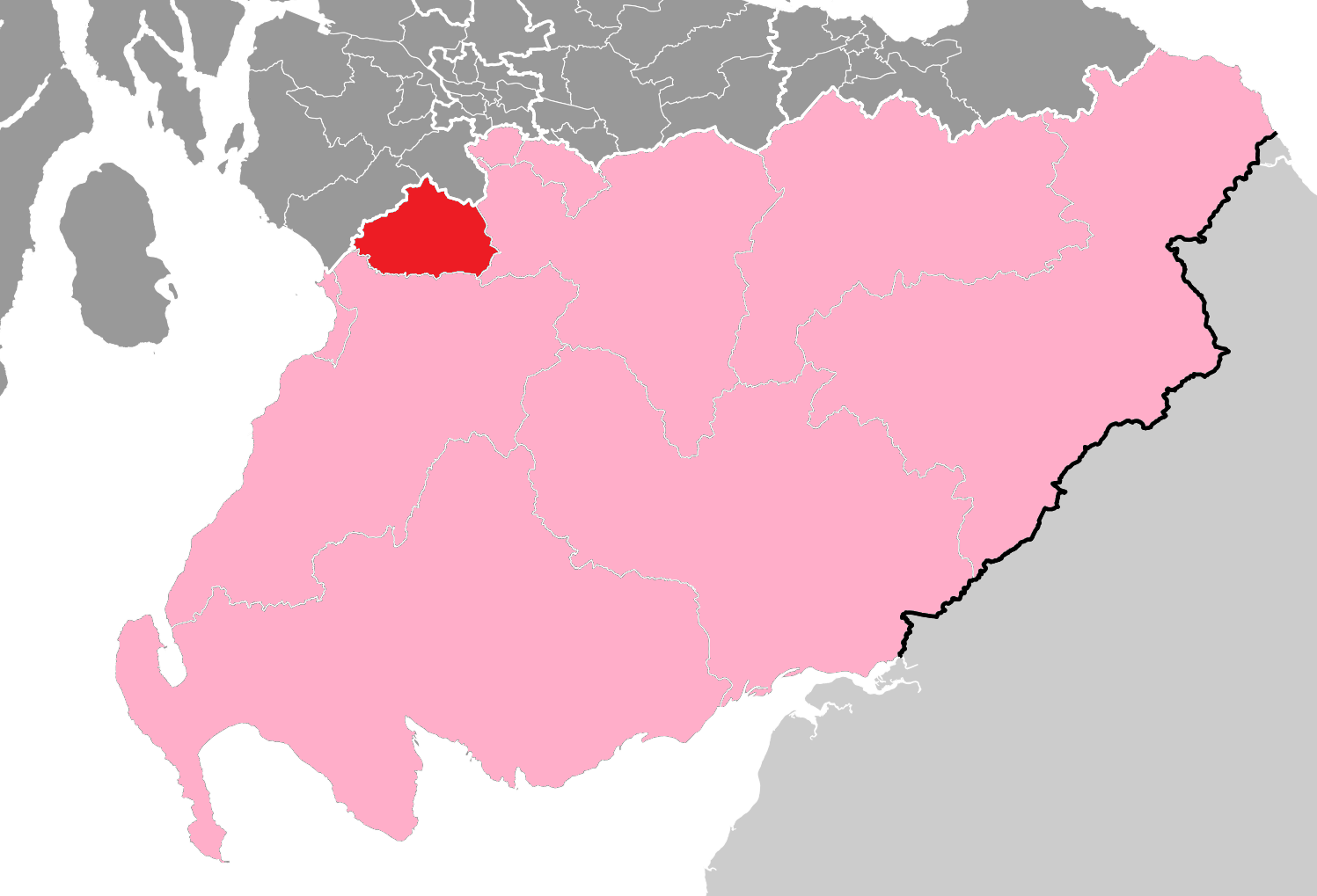

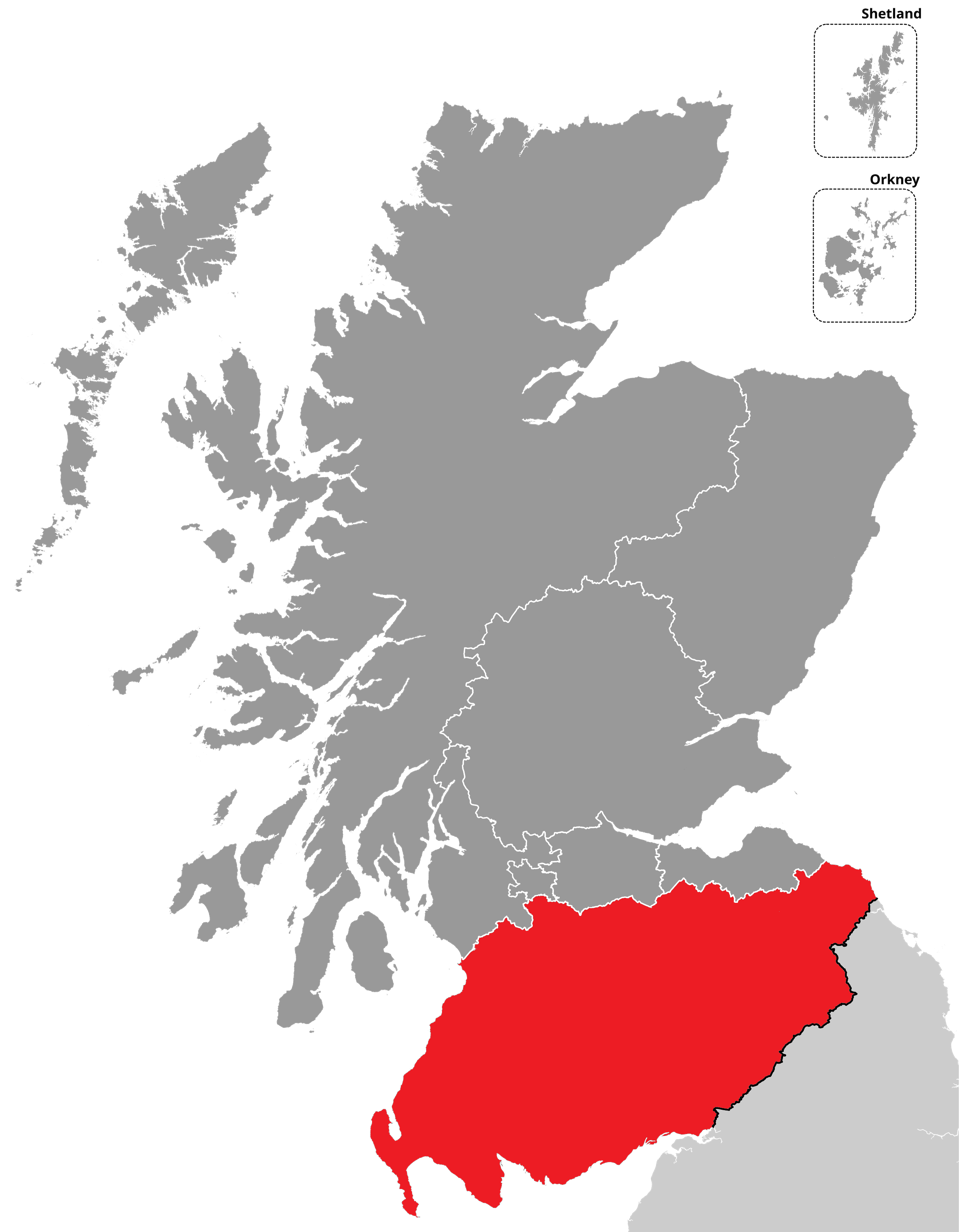
- Kilmarnock and Irvine Valley shown within the South Scotland electoral region, and the region shown within Scotland
- Electoral region: South Scotland
- Electorate: 57,945 (2026)

Current constituency
- Created: 2011
- Party: Scottish National Party
- MSP: Alan Brown
- Council area: East Ayrshire
- Created from: Kilmarnock and Loudoun

Kilmarnock and Irvine Valley is a county constituency of the Scottish Parliament covering part of the council area of East Ayrshire. Under the additional-member electoral system used for elections to the Scottish Parliament, it elects one Member of the Scottish Parliament (MSP) by the first past the post method of election. It is also one of ten constituencies in the South Scotland electoral region, which elects seven additional members, in addition to the ten constituency MSPs, to produce a form of proportional representation for the region as a whole.

The seat was created for the 2011 Scottish Parliament election, following the redrawing and renaming of the old Kilmarnock and Loudoun constituency which had been in the Central Scotland region. It has been held by Alan Brown of the Scottish National Party since the 2026 Scottish Parliament election.

== Electoral region ==
Following the second periodic review of Scottish Parliament boundaries in 2025, the other nine constituencies of the South Scotland region are: Ayr; Carrick, Cumnock and Doon Valley; Clydesdale; Dumfriesshire; East Kilbride; Ettrick, Roxburgh and Berwickshire; Galloway and West Dumfries; Hamilton, Larkhall and Stonehouse; and Midlothian South, Tweeddale and Lauderdale. The region covers the whole of the council areas of Dumfries and Galloway, Scottish Borders, and South Ayrshire council areas; and parts of the council areas of East Ayrshire, Midlothian, and South Lanarkshire. By population it is now the largest of Scotland's eight electoral regions.

Prior to the 2025 review, there were nine constituencies in the South Scotland region. Besides Kilmarnock and Irvine Valley, the other eight constituencies were: Ayr; Carrick, Cumnock and Doon Valley; Clydesdale; Dumfriesshire; East Lothian; Ettrick, Roxburgh and Berwickshire; Galloway and West Dumfries; and Midlothian South, Tweeddale and Lauderdale. The region covered the Dumfries and Galloway, East Ayrshire, Scottish Borders and South Ayrshire council areas in full and parts of the East Lothian, Midlothian and South Lanarkshire council areas.

== Constituency boundaries and council area ==
Wards of the Kilmarnock and Irvine Valley Scottish Parliament constituency as of 2011.

East Ayrshire is represented in the Scottish Parliament by three constituencies: Carrick, Cumnock and Doon Valley; Kilmarnock and Irvine Valley; and Cunninghame South, the latter also covering part of North Ayrshire and lying within the West Scotland electoral region.

The seat was created in 2011 by the First Periodic Review of Scottish Parliament Boundaries. At the Second Periodic Review of Scottish Parliament Boundaries undertaken by Boundaries Scotland ahead of the 2026 Scottish Parliament election changes were made, with the villages of Dunlop and Stewarton being transferred to the Cunninghame South constituency in order to address differences in electorate size between the two seats. The electoral wards of East Ayrshire Council used in the current creation of Kilmarnock and Irvine Valley are:

- Annick (shared with Cunninghame South)
- Kilmarnock North (entire ward)
- Kilmarnock West and Crosshouse (entire ward)
- Kilmarnock East and Hurlford (entire ward)
- Kilmarnock South (entire ward)
- Irvine Valley (entire ward)
- Ballochmyle (shared with Carrick, Cumnock and Doon Valley)

== Constituency profile ==
The Kilmarnock and Irvine Valley constituency is a part-urban part-rural constituency located along the northern half of the East Ayrshire council area. Towards the south-west of the constituency is the town of Kilmarnock and its adjoining towns and villages. Kilmarnock is a former industrial town which is mostly made up of social housing, with some suburban housing towards the western end of the town. To the east of the town, along the valley of the River Irvine, is a string of industrial towns and villages such as Galston and Newmilns located within the parish of Loudoun. The region was once dependent upon the manufacture of textiles before the industry's collapse throughout the mid-20th Century.

== Member of the Scottish Parliament ==
Election	Member	Party
2011	Willie Coffey	Scottish National Party
2026	Alan Brown	Scottish National Party

== Election results ==
=== 2020s ===
2026 Scottish Parliament election: Kilmarnock and Irvine Valley (Note: Note that changes in constituency vote share are shown with respect to the notional result of the 2021 election, calculated to account for boundary changes)
Party	Candidate	Constituency			Regional		
Party	Candidate	Votes	%	±%	Votes	%	±%
SNP	Alan Brown	11,919	40.9	▼13.0	8,965	30.7	
Labour	Ewan MacPhee	7,458	25.6	▲2.5	6,409	21.9	
Reform	Anne Millar	5,441	18.7	New	5,838	20.0	
Green					2,765	9.5	
Conservative	James Adams	2,780	9.5	▼10.7	2,690	9.2	
Liberal Democrats	Michael Gregori	1,169	4.0	▲1.8	1,175	4.0	
AtLS	Garry McClay	407	1.4	New	427	1.5	
Independent Green Voice					340	1.2	
Scottish Family					245	0.9	
Scottish Socialist					88	0.3	
Heritage					63	0.2	
Independent	Denise Sommerville				57	0.2	
Independent	Sean Davies				47	0.2	
ADF					46	0.2	
UKIP					43	0.1	
Scottish Common Party					23	0.1	
Scottish Libertarian					23	0.1	
Majority		4,461	15.3	▼12.6			
Valid votes		29,174			29,244		
Invalid votes		106			79		
Turnout		29,280	50.5	▼10.7	29,323	50.6	
SNP hold		Swing					
Notes

2021 Scottish Parliament election: Kilmarnock and Irvine Valley
Party	Candidate	Constituency			Regional		
Party	Candidate	Votes	%	±%	Votes	%	±%
SNP	Willie Coffey (Note: Incumbent member for this constituency)	21,418	52.7	▼2.7	18,649	45.8	▼3.4
Labour	Kevin McGregor	9,737	24.0	▲1.2	8,199	20.1	▼0.8
Conservative	Brian Whittle (Note: Incumbent member on the party list, or for another constituency)	8,295	20.4	▲1.2	8,781	21.6	▲1.9
Green					2,017	5.0	▲0.6
Liberal Democrats	Stephen McQuistin	919	2.3	▼0.3	868	2.1	0.0
All for Unity					706	1.7	New
Alba					636	1.6	New
Independent Green Voice					223	0.5	New
Scottish Family					177	0.4	New
Abolish the Scottish Parliament					137	0.3	New
Scottish Libertarian	Stef Johnstone	253	0.6	New	89	0.2	New
Reform					86	0.2	New
UKIP					57	0.1	▼1.9
Freedom Alliance (UK)					61	0.1	New
Scotia Future					23	0.1	New
Vanguard Party (UK)					11	0.0	New
Majority		11,681	28.7	▼3.9			
Valid votes		40,622			40,720		
Invalid votes		90			55		
Turnout		40,712	61.5	▲6.4	40,775	61.6	▲6.5
SNP hold		Swing					

=== 2010s ===
2016 Scottish Parliament election: Kilmarnock and Irvine Valley
Party	Candidate	Constituency			Regional		
Party	Candidate	Votes	%	±%	Votes	%	±%
SNP	Willie Coffey (Note: Incumbent member for this constituency)	19,047	55.4	▲2.2	16,952	49.2	▲0.8
Labour	Dave Meechan	7,853	22.8	▼11.6	7,209	20.9	▼10.9
Conservative	Brian Whittle (Note: Elected on the party list)	6,597	19.2	▲8.8	6,799	19.7	▲9.4
Green					1,522	4.4	▲2.0
Liberal Democrats	Rebecca Plenderleith	888	2.6	▲0.7	710	2.1	▲0.5
UKIP					706	2.0	▲1.4
Solidarity					251	0.7	▲0.5
RISE					193	0.6	New
Clydesdale and South Scotland Independent					121	0.4	New
Majority		11,194	32.6	▲13.8			
Valid votes		34,385			34,463		
Invalid votes		116			49		
Turnout		34,501	55.1	▲4.5	34,512	55.1	▲4.5
SNP hold		Swing		▲6.8			
Notes

2011 Scottish Parliament election: Kilmarnock and Irvine Valley
Party	Candidate	Constituency			Regional		
Party	Candidate	Votes	%	±%	Votes	%	±%
SNP	Willie Coffey (Note: Incumbent member for the Kilmarnock and Loudoun constituency)	16,964	53.2	N/A	15,438	48.4	N/A
Labour	Matt McLaughlin	10,971	34.4	N/A	10,154	31.8	N/A
Conservative	Grant Fergusson	3,309	10.4	N/A	3,271	10.3	N/A
Green					756	2.4	N/A
All-Scotland Pensioners Party					574	1.8	N/A
Liberal Democrats	Robbie Simpson	614	1.9	N/A	498	1.6	N/A
Socialist Labour					402	1.3	N/A
BNP					268	0.8	N/A
UKIP					207	0.6	N/A
Scottish Christian					181	0.6	N/A
Scottish Socialist					103	0.3	N/A
Solidarity					54	0.2	N/A
Majority		5,993	18.8	N/A			
Valid votes		31,858			31,906		
Invalid votes		126			93		
Turnout		31,984	50.6	N/A	31,999	50.6	N/A
SNP win (new seat)							
