= 2022 East Ayrshire Council election =

East Ayrshire Council election

- 5 May 2022

All 32 seats to East Ayrshire Council 17 seats needed for a majority
- Registered: 97,147
- Turnout: 43.7%
	First party	Second party	Third party
	SNP	Lab	Con
Leader	Douglas Reid	Maureen McKay	Tom Cook
Party	SNP	Labour	Conservative
Leader's seat	Kilmarnock West and Crosshouse	Kilmarnock North	Kilmarnock West and Crosshouse (stood down)
Last election	14 seats, 38.5%	9 seats, 25.2%	6 seats, 24.2%
Seats before	13	9	5
Seats won	14	10	4
Seat change	Steady	▲1	▼2
Popular vote	15,968	12,786	7,560
Percentage	37.9%	29.5%	17.7%
Swing	▼0.6%	▲4.3%	▼6.5%
	Fourth party	Fifth party
	Ind	Rbsh
Leader	N/A	Sally Cogley
Party	Independent	Rubbish
Leader's seat	N/A	Irvine Valley
Last election	2 seats, 8.1%	1 seat, 1.9%
Seats before	4	1
Seats won	3	1
Seat change	▲1	Steady
Popular vote	4,730	787
Percentage	11.4%	1.9%
Swing	▲3.3%	Steady
- Results by ward
Leader before election
Douglas Reid
(SNP)
No overall control
Leader after election
Douglas Reid
(SNP)
No overall control

Elections to East Ayrshire Council took place on 5 May 2022 on the same day as the 31 other Scottish local government elections. As with other Scottish council elections, it was held using single transferable vote (STV) – a form of proportional representation – in which multiple candidates are elected in each ward and voters rank candidates in order of preference.

For the third consecutive election, the Scottish National Party (SNP) were returned as the largest party with 14 seats but remained shy of an overall majority. Labour gained back some of the ground they had lost at the previous election and were again returned as the second-largest party with 10 seats. The Conservatives lost one-third of their seats to return four councillors while The Rubbish Party retained their only seat. Three independent candidates were also elected.

The minority SNP administration retained control of the council with incumbent council leader Cllr Douglas Reid re-elected to the post unopposed. Former SNP Provost Jim Todd and Depute Provost Claire Leitch were also reinstated less than a year after being voted out of the roles.

== Background ==
=== Previous election ===
At the previous election in 2017, the Scottish National Party (SNP) again won the most seats and governed with a minority administration. Overall, the SNP lost one seat to hold 14. Labour lost five seats but were still the second largest party with nine councillors and the Conservatives made a net gain of four to hold six seats. Two independents were elected – up one – and The Rubbish Party - standing in its first election - had their first councillor elected.

2017 East Ayrshire Council election result
Party	Seats	Vote share
SNP	14	38.5%
Labour	9	25.2%
Conservatives	6	24.2%
Independent	2	8.1%
Rubbish	1	1.9%

=== Electoral system ===
The election used the nine wards created under the Local Governance (Scotland) Act 2004, with 32 councillors being elected. Each ward elected either 3 or 4 members, using the single transferable vote (STV) electoral system – a form of proportional representation – where candidates are ranked in order of preference.

=== Composition ===
No by-elections were held following the previous election in 2017. The only changes in the political composition of the council came when Councillor Ian Grant was expelled from the Conservative group and became an independent in February 2022 and when Councillor John Bell resigned from the SNP in March 2022.

Composition of East Ayrshire Council
Party	2017 result	Dissolution
SNP	14	13
Labour	9	9
Conservative	6	5
Rubbish	1	1
Independents	2	4

=== Retiring councillors ===
Retiring councillors
Ward	Party	Retiring councillor
Annick	SNP	Gordon Jenkins
Kilmarnock North	SNP	Helen Coffey
Kilmarnock West and Crosshouse	Conservative	Tom Cook
Kilmarnock East and Hurlford	SNP	Fiona Campbell
Kilmarnock East and Hurlford	SNP	John Campbell
Kilmarnock South	Labour	John Knapp
Irvine Valley	Labour	George Mair
Irvine Valley	SNP	Elena Whitham
Ballochmyle	Labour	Neil McGhee
Ballochmyle	SNP	Jim Roberts
Cumnock and New Cumnock	Conservative	Walter Young
Doon Valley	Labour	Elaine Dinwoodie

=== Candidates ===
The total number of candidates fell from 63 in 2017 to 54. As was the case five years previous, the SNP fielded the highest number of candidates at 17 (one less than in 2017) across the nine wards. Both Labour and the Conservatives also fielded at least one candidate in every ward but the 11 candidates fielded by Labour were two less than in 2017 whereas the Conservatives maintained a total of nine candidates. Unlike the previous election, the Libertarians did not contest every ward after only one candidate was selected. The Greens only fielded one candidate, down from four in 2017 while The Rubbish Party maintained their number of candidates at one. The Liberal Democrats contested an election in East Ayrshire for the first time since 2012 as they fielded two candidates. As was the case in 2017, nine independent candidates stood for election and the Alba Party contested an election in East Ayrshire for the first time.

== Results ==
2022 East Ayrshire Council election result
Party	Seats	Gains	Losses	Net gain/loss	Seats %	Votes %	Votes	+/−
SNP	14	1	1	Steady	43.7	37.9	15,767	▼0.6
Labour	10	1	0	▲1	31.2	29.5	12,251	▲4.3
Conservative	4	0	2	▼2	12.5	17.7	7,351	▼6.5
Independent	3	1	0	▲1	9.3	11.4	4,730	▲3.3
Rubbish	1	0	0	Steady	3.1	1.9	787	Steady
Green	0	0	0	Steady	0.0	0.5	228	▼1.1
Alba	0	0	0	Steady	0.0	0.5	227	New
Liberal Democrats	0	0	0	Steady	0.0	0.4	183	New
Scottish Libertarian	0	0	0	Steady	0.0	0.1	38	▼0.4
Total	32						41,562	

Note: Votes are the sum of first preference votes across all council wards. The net gain/loss and percentage changes relate to the result of the previous Scottish local elections on 4 May 2017. This is because STV has an element of proportionality which is not present unless multiple seats are being elected. This may differ from other published sources showing gain/loss relative to seats held at the dissolution of Scotland's councils.

=== Ward summary ===
Results of the 2022 East Ayrshire Council election by ward
Ward	%	Cllrs	%	Cllrs	%	Cllrs	%	Cllrs	%	Cllrs	Total Cllrs
Ward	SNP		Labour		Conservative		Rubbish		Others		Total Cllrs
Annick	33.1	1	19.1	1	24.5	1			23.2	1	4
Kilmarnock North	47.6	2	27.9	1	13.8	0			10.7	0	3
Kilmarnock West and Crosshouse	38.4	2	28.2	1	22.0	1			11.4	0	4
Kilmarnock East and Hurlford	37.2	2	38.5	1	12.1	0			12.2	1	4
Kilmarnock South	53.3	2	31.4	1	12.2	0			3.2	0	3
Irvine Valley	41.6	1	22.6	1	17.3	0	18.5	1			3
Ballochmyle	39.7	2	32.7	1	16.8	1			10.9	0	4
Cumnock and New Cumnock	33.9	1	41.2	2	18.5	1			2.4	0	4
Doon Valley	20.8	1	23.1	1	16.7	0			39.4	1	3
Total	37.9	14	29.5	10	17.7	4	1.9	1	12.9	3	32

=== Seats changing hands ===
Below is a list of seats which elected a different party or parties from 2017 in order to highlight the change in political composition of the council from the previous election. The list does not include defeated incumbents who resigned or defected from their party and subsequently failed re-election while the party held the seat.

Seats changing hands
Seat	2017		2022	
Seat	Party	Member	Party	Member
Kilmarnock North	Conservative	Ian Grant	SNP	David William Richardson
Kilmarnock East and Hurlford	Conservative	John Herd	Independent	Graham Boyd
Cumnock and New Cumnock	SNP	Jacqui Todd	Labour	June Kyle

Notes

1. Note 1: In 2017, Ian Grant was elected as a Conservative candidate but was later expelled from the party.

== Ward results ==
=== Annick ===
The SNP, the Conservatives, Labour and independent candidate Ellen Freel held the seats they won at the previous election.

Annick – 4 seats
Party	Candidate	FPv%	Count				
Party	Candidate	FPv%	1	2	3	4	5
Conservative	John McFadzean (incumbent)	24.5	1,516				
Labour	John McGhee (incumbent)	19.1	1,183	1,270			
SNP	Stephen Canning	16.9	1,048	1,052	1,054	1,139	2,086
SNP	Wendy Hannah	16.1	998	1,004	1,007	1,063	
Independent	Ellen Freel (incumbent)	13.1	812	872	883	1,216	1,274
Independent	John Cairns	10.1	627	666	672		
Electorate: 12,530 Valid: 6,184 Spoilt: 80 Quota: 1,237 Turnout: 50.0%

=== Kilmarnock North ===
The SNP and Labour retained the seats they had won at the previous election while the Conservatives lost their only seat to the SNP. Independent candidate Ian Grant was elected as a Conservative candidate in 2017 but was later expelled from the party.

Kilmarnock North – 3 seats
Party	Candidate	FPv%	Count					
Party	Candidate	FPv%	1	2	3	4	5	6
SNP	Elaine Cowan	38.2	1,483					
Labour	Maureen McKay (incumbent)	27.9	1,084					
Conservative	Allan MacDonald	13.8	536	542	566	574	713	
SNP	David William Richardson	9.4	364	788	804	855	939	1,035
Independent	Ian Grant (incumbent)	8.1	316	343	366	397		
Alba	Wendy MacDonald	2.6	99	113	119			
Electorate: 9,748 Valid: 3,882 Spoilt: 53 Quota: 971 Turnout: 40.4%

=== Kilmarnock West and Crosshouse ===
The SNP (2), Labour (1) and the Conservatives (1) retained the seats they had won at the previous election.

Kilmarnock West and Crosshouse – 4 seats
Party	Candidate	FPv%	Count			
Party	Candidate	FPv%	1	2	3	4
Labour	Lillian Jones (incumbent)	28.2	1,662			
Conservative	James Adams	22.0	1,297			
SNP	Iain Linton (incumbent)	19.8	1,168	1,219		
SNP	Douglas Reid (incumbent)	18.6	1,093	1,142	1,149	1,182
Independent	Frank McNiff	6.3	369	475	516	517
Green	Elizabeth Brown	3.9	228	299	308	312
Alba	Guy Njali Bola	1.2	71	81	82	83
Electorate: 13,347 Valid: 5,888 Spoilt: 70 Quota: 1,178 Turnout: 44.6%

=== Kilmarnock East and Hurlford ===
The SNP (2) and Labour (1) retained the seats they won in the previous election while the Conservatives lost their only seat to independent candidate Graham Boyd.

Kilmarnock East and Hurlford – 4 seats
Party	Candidate	FPv%	Count				
Party	Candidate	FPv%	1	2	3	4	5
Labour	Barry Douglas (incumbent)	38.5	2,053				
SNP	Graham Barton	28.2	1,501				
Conservative	Jon Herd (incumbent)	12.1	645	796	798	854	
Independent	Graham Boyd	10.8	574	776	799	879	1,288
SNP	Neal Ingram	9.0	481	616	983	1,000	1,030
Liberal Democrats	Trevor Grant	1.4	74	209	218		
Electorate: 12,370 Valid: 5,328 Spoilt: 69 Quota: 1,066 Turnout: 43.6%

=== Kilmarnock South ===
The SNP (2) and Labour (1) retained the seats they won at the previous election

Kilmarnock South – 3 seats
Party	Candidate	FPv%	Count	
Party	Candidate	FPv%	1	2
SNP	Jim Todd (incumbent)	32.6	990	
Labour	Peter Mabon	31.4	954	
SNP	Claire Maitland (incumbent)	20.7	627	828
Conservative	Robin Bawa	12.2	370	374
Alba	Stewart John McLintock	1.9	57	62
Scottish Libertarian	Keyrin James Von-Döring	1.3	38	40
Electorate: 8,186 Valid: 3,036 Spoilt: 67 Quota: 760 Turnout: 37.9%

=== Irvine Valley ===
The SNP, Labour and the Rubbish Party retained the seats they won at the previous election

Irvine Valley – 3 seats
Party	Candidate	FPv%	Count				
Party	Candidate	FPv%	1	2	3	4	5
SNP	Beverley Michele Clark	30.8	1,309				
Labour	Kevin McGregor	22.6	962	974	1,153		
Rubbish	Sally Cogley (incumbent)	18.5	787	801	982	1,017	1,547
Conservative	Susan McFadzean	17.3	737	739	763	782	
SNP	Lee-Anne Margaret To	10.8	461	667			
Electorate: 9,797 Valid: 4,256 Spoilt: 46 Quota: 1,065 Turnout: 43.9%

=== Ballochmyle ===
The SNP (2), Labour (1) and the Conservatives (1) retained the seats they won at the previous election.

Ballochmyle – 4 seats
Party	Candidate	FPv%	Count					
Party	Candidate	FPv%	1	2	3	4	5	6
SNP	Claire Leitch (incumbent)	28.0	1,301					
Labour	Linda Holland	23.4	1,085					
Conservative	Alyson Simmons (incumbent)	16.8	779	781	786	912	914	1,112
SNP	William Lennox	11.7	542	863	869	981		
Independent	David Shaw	10.9	507	522	532			
Labour	Stephen McCarron	9.3	432	444	565	691	706	
Electorate: 11,193 Valid: 4,646 Spoilt: 100 Quota: 930 Turnout: 42.4%

=== Cumnock and New Cumnock ===
Labour and the Conservatives retained the seats they won at the previous election while the SNP retained one seat and lost one seat to Labour.

Cumnock and New Cumnock – 4 seats
Party	Candidate	FPv%	Count				
Party	Candidate	FPv%	1	2	3	4	5
Labour	Billy Crawford (incumbent)	30.1	1,349				
SNP	Jim McMahon (incumbent)	20.0	897				
Conservative	Neill Watts	18.5	827	847	858	858	915
SNP	Jacqui Todd (incumbent)	15.7	701	714	723	724	752
Labour	June Kyle	13.2	593	961			
Liberal Democrats	Fraser Wright	2.4	109	114	127	127	
Electorate: 11,044 Valid: 4,476 Spoilt: 116 Quota: 896 Turnout: 41.6%

=== Doon Valley ===
Independent candidate Drew Filson, Labour and the SNP held the seats they won at the previous election. Independent candidate John Bell was elected as an SNP candidate in 2017 but he later resigned from the party.

Doon Valley – 3 seats
Party	Candidate	FPv%	Count					
Party	Candidate	FPv%	1	2	3	4	5	6
Independent	Drew Filson (incumbent)	27.9	1,077					
Labour	Elaine Stewart	23.1	894	929	974			
SNP	Jennifer Hogg	20.8	803	817	826	827	927	1,074
Conservative	Samantha Hainey	16.7	644	651	681	682	780	
Independent	John Bell (incumbent)	8.0	311	333	373	375		
Independent	Murray Hendrie	3.5	137	146				
Electorate: 8,932 Valid: 3,866 Spoilt: 59 Quota: 967 Turnout: 43.9%

== Aftermath ==
The SNP, who have run East Ayrshire Council since forming an administration as a result of the 2007 election, retained control of the council. It was reported that the party had been worried they would lose control of the council – as was the case in other councils across Scotland where unionist parties had voted together to prevent nationalist leadership – but the Labour and Conservative groups didn't oppose Cllr Douglas Reid's re-election as council leader. Provost Jim Todd and Depute Provost Claire Leitch were reinstated to their roles despite Labour and the Conservatives putting forward candidates for the roles however, the two parties did not support each other. The pair had been voted out in June 2021 when the opposition parties had voted together to have the leadership roles of the council shared more evenly across the council reflecting the fact the SNP administration was a minority administration.

Former Conservative group leader Tom Cook stood down at the 2022 election. He was replaced in the role by Annick councillor John McFadzean.

In October 2024, Provost Todd announced "with regret" that he would stand down as Provost due to "personal circumstances". He was replaced in the role by Deputy Provost Leitch and, in turn, Cllr John McGhee was elected as Provost Leitch's replacement as Deputy Provost. It was later revealed that Cllr McGhee had been suspended by Labour in October 2024 after effectively sitting as an independent councillor since the 2022 election. He was still a fully paid member of Labour until his suspension.

Labour group leader Maureen McKay died in November 2024. She was replaced in the role by Kilmarnock East and Hurlford councillor Barry Douglas.

=== November 2024 by-elections ===
Following their successful campaigns during the 2024 United Kingdom general election, Kilmarnock West and Crosshouse councillor Lillian Jones and Doon Valley councillor Elaine Stewart - who were elected as MP for Kilmarnock and Loudoun and Ayr, Carrick and Cumnock respectively - announced that they had resigned their council seats in September 2024. By-elections, held on 14 November 2024, were won by Labour candidates Jim Kyle and Jayne Sangster.

Doon Valley by-election (14 November 2024) – 1 seat
Party	Candidate	FPv%	Count						
Party	Candidate	FPv%	1	2	3	4	5	6	7
Labour	Jim Kyle	32.2	516	516	523	537	569	699	826
Conservative	Tracey Clark	25.5	410	411	412	423	475	506	
SNP	Lorraine Pollock	23.7	379	379	391	400	432		
Independent	Jim Ireland	10.7	172	175	179	195			
Liberal Democrats	Trevor Grant	4.2	68	68	77				
Green	Korin Matthew Vallance	3.0	48	49					
Independent	Stef McNamara	0.5	9						
Electorate: 8,763 Valid: 1,602 Spoilt: 27 Quota: 802 Turnout: 18.6%

Kilmarnock West and Crosshouse by-election (14 November 2024) – 1 seat
Party	Candidate	FPv%	Count				
Party	Candidate	FPv%	1	2	3	4	5
Labour	Jayne Sangster	39.4	1,213	1,225	1,276	1,468	1,935
SNP	Marie Robertson	33.3	1,025	1,032	1,060	1,127	
Conservative	Allan MacDonald	20.2	623	635	675		
Liberal Democrats	Lee Manley	4.7	145	162			
Independent	Stephen McNamara	2.4	75				
Electorate: 13,260 Valid: 3,081 Spoilt: 28 Quota: 1,541 Turnout: 23.4%

=== Kilmarnock North by-election ===
Kilmarnock North councillor Maureen McKay died in November 2024. A by-election, held on 20 February 2025, was won by SNP candidate Caroline Barton. Sandra Kirkwood was listed on the ballot paper as a Reform UK candidate but was withdrawn by the party over comments made on social media.

Kilmarnock North by-election (20 February 2025) – 1 seat
Party	Candidate	FPv%	Count							
Party	Candidate	FPv%	1	2	3	4	5	6	7	8
SNP	Caroline Barton	35.7	748	748	751	778	788	809	867	1,067
Labour	Greg MacKenzie	27.8	582	582	592	612	648	673	764	
Independent	Ian Grant	13.2	277	277	286	294	326	395		
Reform	Sandra Kirkwood	10.1	212	212	213	215	241			
Conservative	Allan MacDonald	7.6	159	159	163	167				
Green	Finlay Affleck	2.5	75	76	78					
Liberal Democrats	Lee Manley	1.7	37	37						
Independent	Stephen McNamara	0.1	2							
Electorate: 9,726 Valid: 2,092 Spoilt: 18 Quota: 1,047 Turnout: 21.7%

=== Cumnock and New Cumnock by-election ===
In September 2026, Cumnock and New Cumnock councillor Billy Crawford died following a long illness. A by-election will be held on 10 December 2026.
