= Lillian Jones =

Scottish politician

Lillian Jones MP
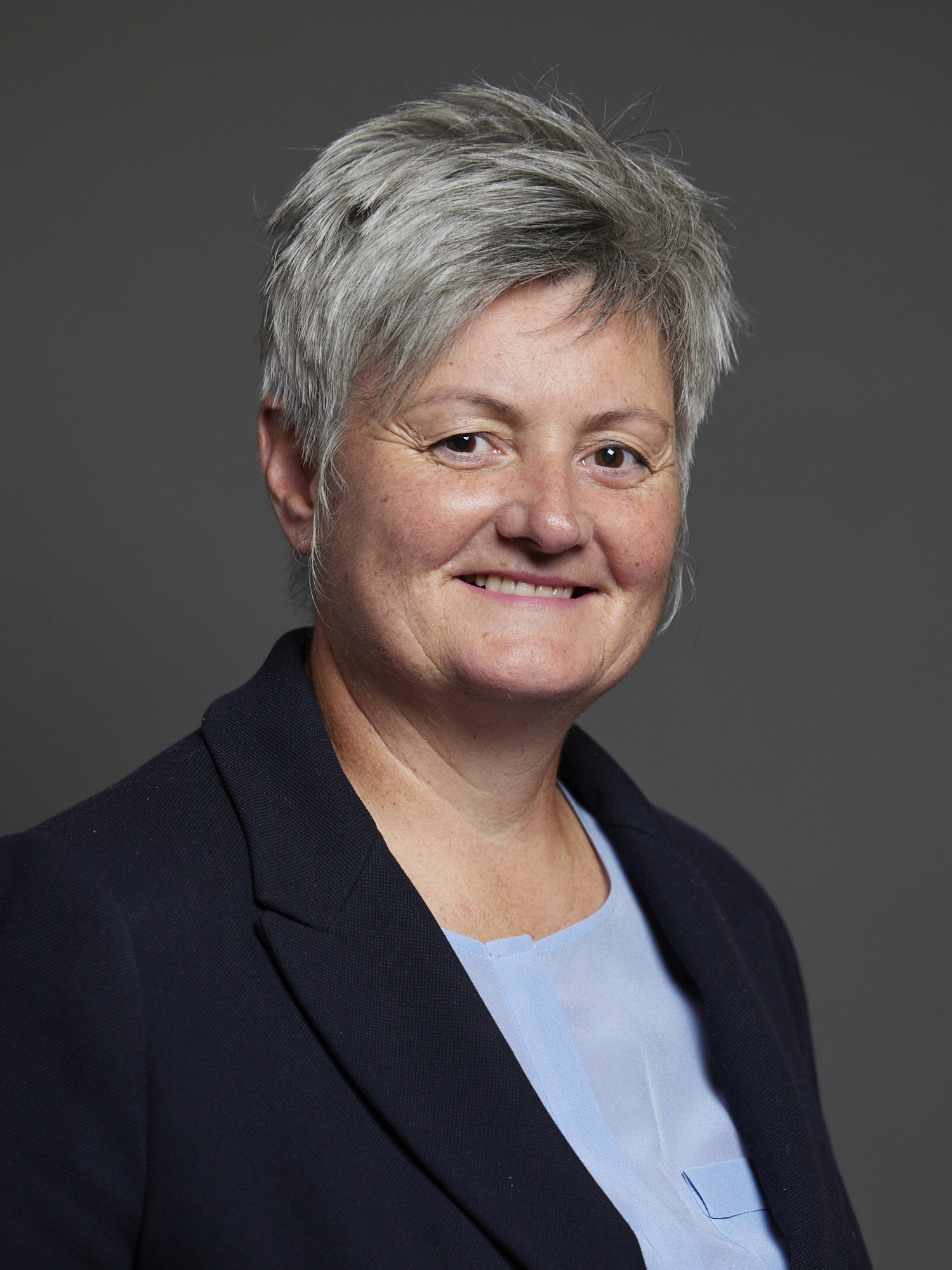
- Official portrait, 2024

Member of Parliament for Kilmarnock and Loudoun
- Incumbent
- Assumed office 4 July 2024
- Preceded by: Alan Brown
- Majority: 5,119 (12.1%)

Councillor for Kilmarnock West and Crosshouse
- In office 3 May 2012 – 2 September 2024
- Preceded by: Robert Keohone
- Succeeded by: Jayne Sangster

Personal details
- Party: Scottish Labour Party
- Profession: NHS worker at NHS Greater Glasgow and Clyde
- Website: Lillian Jones

Lillian Jones is a Scottish Labour Party politician who has served as the Member of Parliament (MP) for Kilmarnock and Loudoun since 2024. Prior to being elected as an MP in July 2024, Jones served as a councillor for the Kilmarnock West and Crosshouse ward within East Ayrshire Council from 3 May 2012 until her resignation on 2 September 2024, as well as working within NHS Greater Glasgow and Clyde.

== Non–political career ==
Outside politics, Jones worked for NHS Greater Glasgow and Clyde during her tenure as a councillor on East Ayrshire Council. Following her victory in the 2024 general election, it remains unclear whether Jones will retain this post within NHS Scotland whilst serving as MP for Kilmarnock and Loudoun.

== East Ayrshire Council ==
Jones was elected as a councillor for the Kilmarnock West and Crosshouse ward at the 2012 East Ayrshire Council election, receiving 1,025 votes. She was subsequently re–elected to the ward in the 2017 East Ayrshire Council election and 2022 East Ayrshire Council election. During her tenure as a councillor on East Ayrshire Council, Jones served as a member on the Governance and Scrutiny Committee, Grants Committee, Local Government Licensing Panel and the Police and Fire and Rescue Committee.

Following her election to the House of Commons in the 2024 United Kingdom general election, there had been speculation that a by-election could be held in East Ayrshire Council to replace Jones. Whilst MPs are not prevented from serving as a local councillor and MP at the same time, it is, however, often expected that MPs who serve as councillors at the time they are elected as an MP stand down from their council position. In a video posted to her Facebook account on 2 September 2024, Jones confirmed she had tendered her resignation "with immediate effect" following writing to the Chief Executive of East Ayrshire Council, and confirmed a by-election would be held in the ward to select her successor. The 2024 Kilmarnock West and Crosshouse by–election to elect her successor to the Kilmarnock West and Crosshouse ward is scheduled to take place on 14 November 2024.

Jones was succeeded as Councillor for Kilmarnock West and Crosshouse by Scottish Labour candidate Jayne Sangster following the November 2024 East Ayrshire Council by–election.

== Parliamentary career ==
Jones has represented the Kilmarnock and Loudoun parliamentary constituency at the House of Commons of the United Kingdom since 4 July 2024, following her election during the 2024 United Kingdom general election.

=== Nomination as candidate ===
Jones was selected as the Scottish Labour Party candidate for the Kilmarnock and Loudoun parliamentary constituency at the United Kingdom parliament, the House of Commons of the United Kingdom. The 2024 United Kingdom general election was scheduled for 4 July, with Jones and Scottish Labour activists beginning campaigning across the constituency shortly after the announcement was made by Prime Minister Rishi Sunak.

=== Election ===
The Kilmarnock and Loudoun seat had previously been considered a Scottish Labour stronghold, having been represented by a Scottish Labour MP since 1983 until the election of Scottish National Party candidate Alan Brown in the 2015 United Kingdom general election. Brown would hold the seat through the subsequent elections, and contested the seat in the 2024 election alongside Jones for Scottish Labour.

Jones was the first Scottish Labour candidate to be declared victorious during election results through 4–5 July, defeating incumbent MP, Alan Brown of the SNP, with a majority of 5,119. Speaking about being elected MP for Kilmarnock and Loudoun, Jones described it as a "poignant moment". Jones said that she felt the result of the election in Kilmarnock and Loudoun "was going to be really close, that’s what was coming through in the polls".

=== Tenure ===
Speaking following her victory in the election contesting the Kilmarnock and Loudoun constituency, Jones voted to "deliver what I said I would deliver", and claimed that will be a "a constituency based MP".

Following the election, Jones thanked Alan Brown, the Scottish National Party MP who won the Kilmarnock and Loudoun seat at the 2015 United Kingdom general election for his "time in office".

== Personal life ==
Jones is openly LGBT+.

Parliament of the United Kingdom
Preceded by Alan Brown	Member of Parliament for Kilmarnock and Loudoun; 2024–present	Incumbent
