= Kilmarnock North (ward) =

Electoral ward of East Ayrshire, Scotland

- East Ayrshire
- Boundary of Kilmarnock North in East Ayrshire from 2007–2017.
- Population: 12,243 (2021)
- Electorate: 9,726 (2025)
- Major settlements: Kilmarnock (part of)
- Scottish Parliament constituency: Kilmarnock and Irvine Valley
- Scottish Parliament region: South Scotland
- UK Parliament constituency: Kilmarnock and Loudon

Current ward
- Created: 2007
- Number of councillors: 3
- Councillor: Elaine Cowan (SNP)
- Councillor: David William Richardson (SNP)
- Councillor: Maureen McKay (Labour)
- Created from: Altonhill, Hillhead and Longpark; Kilmaurs and Stewarton South; North Kilmarnock, Fenwick and Waterside; North New Farm Loch and Dean; Onthank

Kilmarnock North is one of the nine electoral wards of East Ayrshire Council. Created in 2007, the ward elects three councillors using the single transferable vote electoral system and covers an area with a population of 12,243 people.

The area is a Scottish National Party (SNP) stronghold with the party holding two of the three seats at all but one election since the ward's creation.

== Boundaries ==
The ward was created following the Fourth Statutory Reviews of Electoral Arrangements ahead of the 2007 Scottish local elections. As a result of the Local Governance (Scotland) Act 2004, local elections in Scotland would use the single transferable vote electoral system from 2007 onwards so Kilmarnock North was formed from an amalgamation of several previous first-past-the-post wards. It contained all of the former Onthank ward as well as parts of the former Kilmaurs and Stewarton South, |North Kilmarnock, Fenwick and Waterside, Altonhill, Hillhead and Longpark and North New Farm Loch and Dean wards.

Initially, Kilmarnock North included the northernmost part of Kilmarnock including the neighbourhoods of Onthank, Altonhill, Hillhead, Longpark and Southcraigs as well as Dean Castle Country Park. Following the Fifth Statutory Reviews of Electoral Arrangements ahead of the 2017 Scottish local elections, the ward's eastern boundary was moved west to run along the B7038 instead of the Kilmarnock Water and Craufurdland Water. As a result, Dean Castle Country Park is now contained within the Kilmarnock East and Hurlford ward.

== Councillors ==
| Election | Councillors | | |
|---|---|---|---|
| 2007 | Willie Coffey (SNP) | Helen Coffey (SNP) | Maureen McKay (Labour) |
| 2012 | Andrew Hershaw (SNP) | Helen Coffey (SNP) | Maureen McKay (Labour) |
| 2014 by-election | Elaine Cowan (SNP) | Helen Coffey (SNP) | Maureen McKay (Labour) |
| 2017 | Ian Grant (Conservative) | Helen Coffey (SNP) | Maureen McKay (Labour) |
| 2022 | Elaine Cowan (SNP) | David William Richardson (SNP) | Maureen McKay (Labour) |
| 2025 by-election | Elaine Cowan (SNP) | David William Richardson (SNP) | Caroline Barton (SNP) |

== Election results ==
=== 2025 by-election ===
Kilmarnock North by-election (20 February 2025) – 1 seat
| Party | Candidate | FPv% | Count | | | | | | | |
| Party | Candidate | FPv% | 1 | 2 | 3 | 4 | 5 | 6 | 7 | 8 |
|---|---|---|---|---|---|---|---|---|---|---|
| SNP | Caroline Barton | 35.7 | 748 | 748 | 751 | 778 | 788 | 809 | 867 | 1,067 |
| Labour | Greg MacKenzie | 27.8 | 582 | 582 | 592 | 612 | 648 | 673 | 764 | |
| Independent | Ian Grant | 13.2 | 277 | 277 | 286 | 294 | 326 | 395 | | |
| Reform UK | Sandra Kirkwood | 10.1 | 212 | 212 | 213 | 215 | 241 | | | |
| Conservative | Allan MacDonald | 7.6 | 159 | 159 | 163 | 167 | | | | |
| Scottish Green | Finlay Affleck | 0.8 | 75 | 76 | 78 | | | | | |
| Liberal Democrats | Lee Manley | 1.7 | 37 | 37 | | | | | | |
| Independent | Stephen McNamara | 0.1 | 2 | | | | | | | |
Electorate: 9,726 Valid: 2,092 Spoilt: 18 Quota: 1,047 Turnout: 21.7%

=== 2022 election ===
Kilmarnock North – 3 seats
| Party | Candidate | FPv% | Count | | | | | |
| Party | Candidate | FPv% | 1 | 2 | 3 | 4 | 5 | 6 |
|---|---|---|---|---|---|---|---|---|
| SNP | Elaine Cowan | 38.2 | 1,483 | | | | | |
| Labour | Maureen McKay (incumbent) | 27.9 | 1,084 | | | | | |
| Conservative | Allan MacDonald | 13.8 | 536 | 542 | 566 | 574 | 713 | |
| SNP | David William Richardson | 9.4 | 364 | 788 | 804 | 855 | 939 | 1,035 |
| Independent | Ian Grant (incumbent) | 8.1 | 316 | 343 | 366 | 397 | | |
| Alba | Wendy MacDonald | 2.6 | 99 | 113 | 119 | | | |
Electorate: 9,748 Valid: 3,882 Spoilt: 53 Quota: 971 Turnout: 40.4%

=== 2017 election ===
Kilmarnock North - 3 members
| Party | Candidate | FPv% | Count | | | | |
| Party | Candidate | FPv% | 1 | 2 | 3 | 4 | 5 |
|---|---|---|---|---|---|---|---|
| SNP | Helen Coffey (incumbent) | 36.9 | 1,381 | | | | |
| Conservative | Ian Grant | 26.0 | 971 | | | | |
| Labour | Maureen McKay (incumbent) | 23.1 | 865 | 885 | 900 | 924 | 1,300 |
| SNP | Elaine Cowan (incumbent) | 12.9 | 481 | 884 | 886 | 893 | |
| Scottish Libertarian | Lisa Murray | 1.1 | 41 | 44 | 47 | | |
Electorate: 9,109 Valid: 3,739 Spoilt: 40 Quota: 935 Turnout: 41.5%

=== 2014 by-election ===
Kilmarnock North by-election (27 March 2014) – 1 seat
| Party | Candidate | FPv% | Count | | | |
| Party | Candidate | FPv% | 1 | 2 | 3 | 4 |
|---|---|---|---|---|---|---|
| SNP | Elaine Cowan | 44.2 | 1,334 | 1,358 | 1,473 | 2,042 |
| Labour | Scott Thomson | 37.4 | 1,130 | 1,147 | 1,320 | |
| Conservative | Ian Grant | 16.3 | 493 | 501 | | |
| Scottish Green | Robin Tatler | 2.0 | 61 | | | |
Electorate: 9,657 Valid: 3,018 Spoilt: 19 Quota: 1,510 Turnout: 35.6%

=== 2012 election ===
Kilmarnock North – 3 members
| Party | Candidate | FPv% | Count | | |
| Party | Candidate | FPv% | 1 | 2 | 3 |
|---|---|---|---|---|---|
| SNP | Helen Coffey (incumbent) | 44.7 | 1,475 | | |
| Labour | Maureen McKay (incumbent) | 35.7 | 1,176 | | |
| Conservative | Ian Grant | 11.6 | 383 | 417 | 476 |
| SNP | Andrew Hershaw (Note: Kilmarnock North councillor Andrew Hershaw died on 31 December 2013. A by-election was held on 27 March 2014.) | 8.0 | 263 | 817 | 921 |
Electorate: 9,324 Valid: 3,297 Spoilt: 40 Quota: 825 Turnout: 35.4%

=== 2007 election ===
Kilmarnock North - 3 members
| Party | Candidate | FPv% | Count | |
| Party | Candidate | FPv% | 1 | 2 |
|---|---|---|---|---|
| SNP | Willie Coffey | 34.5 | 1,552 | |
| Labour | Maureen McKay | 26.7 | 1,202 | |
| SNP | Helen Coffey | 21.2 | 952 | 1,317 |
| Conservative | James Adams | 15.8 | 709 | 720 |
| Scottish Socialist | Colin Rutherford | 1.9 | 85 | 89 |
Electorate: 8,617 Valid: 4,500 Spoilt: 88 Quota: 1,126 Turnout: 52.2%
