= Annick (ward) =

Electoral ward in East Ayrshire, Scotland

- East Ayrshire
- Boundary of Annick in East Ayrshire from 2007–2017.
- Population: 14,681 (2021)
- Electorate: 12,530 (2022)
- Major settlements: Kilmaurs; Stewarton
- Scottish Parliament constituency: Kilmarnock and Irvine Valley
- Scottish Parliament region: South Scotland
- UK Parliament constituency: Kilmarnock and Loudon

Current ward
- Created: 2007
- Number of councillors: 4
- Councillor: John McFadzean (Conservative)
- Councillor: John McGhee (Labour)
- Councillor: Stephen Canning (SNP)
- Councillor: Ellen Freel (Independent)
- Created from: Kilmaurs and Stewarton South; Stewarton Central; Stewarton East and Dunlop

Annick is one of the nine electoral wards of East Ayrshire Council. Created in 2007, the ward elects four councillors using the single transferable vote electoral system. Originally a three-member ward, Annick was increased in size following a boundary review and has elected four councillors since the 2017 East Ayrshire Council election.

Since the creation of the ward, Labour, the Scottish National Party (SNP) and the Conservatives have held seats with each topping the poll in at least one election.

== Boundaries ==
The ward was created following the Fourth Statutory Reviews of Electoral Arrangements ahead of the 2007 Scottish local elections. As a result of the Local Governance (Scotland) Act 2004, local elections in Scotland would use the single transferable vote electoral system from 2007 onwards so Annick was formed from an amalgamation of several previous first-past-the-post wards.

It contained most of the former Stewarton East and Dunlop and Kilmaurs and Stewarton South wards as well as all of the former Stewarton Central ward and initially elected three members. Annick includes the northernmost part of the council area between its borders with North Ayrshire and East Renfrewshire and takes in the towns of Stewarton, Kilmaurs and Dunlop. Following the Fifth Statutory Reviews of Electoral Arrangements ahead of the 2017 Scottish local elections, the ward was expanded to elect four members. The towns of Fenwick, Moscow and Waterside – previously part of the Irvine Valley ward – to the east of the A77 were included in the new boundaries.

== Councillors ==
Election	Councillors			
2007	John McGhee (Labour)	John MacKay (SNP)	Rose-Ann Cunninghame (Conservative)	
2012	John McGhee (Labour)	Eòghann MacColl (SNP)	Ellen Freel (Ind.)	
2017	John McGhee (Labour)	Gordon Jenkins (SNP)	Ellen Freel (Ind.)	John McFadzean (Conservative)
2022	John McGhee (Labour)	Stephen Canning (SNP)	Ellen Freel (Ind.)	John McFadzean (Conservative)

== Election results ==
=== 2022 election ===
Annick – 4 seats
Party	Candidate	FPv%	Count				
Party	Candidate	FPv%	1	2	3	4	5
Conservative	John McFadzean (incumbent)	24.5	1,516				
Labour	John McGhee (incumbent)	19.1	1,183	1,270			
SNP	Stephen Canning	16.9	1,048	1,052	1,054	1,139	2,086
SNP	Wendy Hannah	16.1	998	1,004	1,007	1,063	
Independent	Ellen Freel (incumbent)	13.1	812	872	883	1,216	1,274
Independent	John Cairns	10.1	627	666	672		
Electorate: 12,530 Valid: 6,184 Spoilt: 80 Quota: 1,237 Turnout: 50.0%

=== 2017 election ===
Annick - 4 members
Party	Candidate	FPv%	Count					
Party	Candidate	FPv%	1	2	3	4	5	6
Conservative	John McFadzean (Note: Sitting councillor for Irvine Valley.)	36.8	2,277					
SNP	Gordon Jenkins	17.4	1,076	1,097	1,098	1,098	1,161	1,993
SNP	Eòghann MacColl (incumbent)	14.9	925	947	948	949	1,005	
Labour	John McGhee (incumbent)	13.5	837	1,078	1,088	1,100	1,154	1,207
Independent	Ellen Freel (incumbent)	12.5	775	1,013	1,021	1,056	1,162	1,224
Scottish Green	Jen Broadhurst	4.4	274	326	328	334		
Independent	Gordon Walker	0.3	20	61	66			
Scottish Libertarian	Amrik Singh	0.1	7	22				
Electorate: 11,761 Valid: 6,191 Spoilt: 63 Quota: 1,239 Turnout: 53.2%

=== 2012 election ===
Annick – 3 members
Party	Candidate	FPv%	Count					
Party	Candidate	FPv%	1	2	3	4	5	6
Labour	John McGhee (incumbent)	24.4	1,021	1,032	1,060			
SNP	Eòghann MacColl	22.7	947	957	1,327			
Conservative	Rose-Ann Cunninghame (incumbent)	20.9	873	886	907	941	943	
Independent	Ellen Freel	19.4	810	827	858	960	965	1,394
SNP	John MacKay (incumbent)	11.0	461	465				
Liberal Democrats	Greg Foster	1.6	68					
Electorate: 9,497 Valid: 4,180 Spoilt: 57 Quota: 1,046 Turnout: 44.0%

=== 2007 election ===
Annick - 3 members
Party	Candidate	FPv%	Count					
Party	Candidate	FPv%	1	2	3	4	5	6
SNP	John MacKay	30.7	1,625					
Conservative	Rose-Ann Cunninghame	21.1	1,117	1,163	1,194	1,401		
Labour	John McGhee	17.2	909	945	958	1,087	1,102	1,840
Labour	Jim O'Neil	17.1	905	928	938	1,077	1,085	
Independent	Ann Hay	12.3	651	726	746			
BNP	Thomas Sweeten	1.6	86	99				
Electorate: 9,068 Valid: 5,293 Spoilt: 89 Quota: 1,324 Turnout: 58.3%
