= Kilmarnock South (ward) =

Electoral ward of East Ayrshire, Scotland

- East Ayrshire
- Boundary of Kilmarnock South in East Ayrshire from 2007–2017.
- Population: 10,866 (2021)
- Electorate: 8,186 (2022)
- Major settlements: Kilmarnock (part of)
- Scottish Parliament constituency: Kilmarnock and Irvine Valley
- Scottish Parliament region: South Scotland
- UK Parliament constituency: Kilmarnock and Loudon

Current ward
- Created: 2007
- Number of councillors: 3
- Councillor: Jim Todd (SNP)
- Councillor: Peter Mabon (Labour)
- Councillor: Claire Maitland (SNP)
- Created from: Bellfield; Riccarton; Shortlees

Kilmarnock South is one of the nine electoral wards of East Ayrshire Council. Created in 2007, the ward elects three councillors using the single transferable vote electoral system and covers an area with a population of 10,866 people.

The area is a Scottish National Party (SNP) stronghold with the party holding two of the three seats at every election.

== Boundaries ==
The ward was created following the Fourth Statutory Reviews of Electoral Arrangements ahead of the 2007 Scottish local elections. As a result of the Local Governance (Scotland) Act 2004, local elections in Scotland would use the single transferable vote electoral system from 2007 onwards so Kilmarnock South was formed from an amalgamation of several previous first-past-the-post wards.

It contains all of the former Shortlees and Bellfield wards as well as most of the former Riccarton ward. The only minor alteration to the previous ward boundaries was along the former Riccarton boundary which was brought south to run along the A71 rather than along the River Irvine to the north of the road. Kilmarnock South includes the southernmost part of Kilmarnock including the neighbourhoods of Shortlees, Bellfield and Riccarton as well as an area between Kilmarnock and the council's boundary with South Ayrshire. Following the Fifth Statutory Reviews of Electoral Arrangements ahead of the 2017 Scottish local elections, the ward's boundaries were not changed.

== Councillors ==
Election	Councillors		
2007	Hugh Ross (SNP)	Jim Todd (SNP)	John Knapp (Labour)
2012	Hugh Ross (SNP)	Jim Todd (SNP)	John Knapp (Labour)
2017	Clare Maitland (SNP)	Jim Todd (SNP)	John Knapp (Labour)
2022	Clare Maitland (SNP)	Jim Todd (SNP)	Peter Mabon (Labour)

== Election results ==
=== 2022 election ===
Kilmarnock South – 3 seats
Party	Candidate	FPv%	Count	
Party	Candidate	FPv%	1	2
SNP	Jim Todd (incumbent)	32.6	990	
Labour	Peter Mabon	31.4	954	
SNP	Claire Maitland (incumbent)	20.7	627	828
Conservative	Robin Bawa	12.2	370	374
Alba	Stewart John McLintock	1.9	57	62
Scottish Libertarian	Keyrin James Von-Döring	1.3	38	40
Electorate: 8,186 Valid: 3,036 Spoilt: 67 Quota: 760 Turnout: 37.9%

=== 2017 election ===
Kilmarnock South - 3 members
Party	Candidate	FPv%	Count	
Party	Candidate	FPv%	1	2
SNP	Jim Todd (incumbent)	36.5	1,190	
Labour	John Knapp (incumbent)	32.9	1,073	
SNP	Clare Maitland	18.2	593	914
Conservative	Billy McClure	11.7	382	387
Scottish Libertarian	Caitlin O'Brien	0.7	24	29
Electorate: 8,028 Valid: 3,262 Spoilt: 62 Quota: 816 Turnout: 41.4%

=== 2012 election ===
Kilmarnock South – 3 members
Party	Candidate	FPv%	Count			
Party	Candidate	FPv%	1	2	3	4
Labour	John Knapp (incumbent)	37.6	1,250			
SNP	Jim Todd (incumbent)	23.8	791	814	822	949
SNP	Hugh Ross (incumbent)	22.1	735	759	789	924
Labour	Ronnie Scott	12.5	417	743	785	
Conservative	Alyson Holden	4.1	135	138		
Electorate: 8,288 Valid: 3,328 Spoilt: 93 Quota: 833 Turnout: 40.2%

=== 2007 election ===
Kilmarnock South - 3 members
Party	Candidate	FPv%	Count					
Party	Candidate	FPv%	1	2	3	4	5	6
Labour	John Knapp	38.7	1,708					
SNP	Hugh Ross	25.0	1,104	1,144				
SNP	Jim Todd	19.7	870	894	926	954	1,018	1,272
Labour	Ray Murray	9.0	398	800	801	825	901	
Conservative	Tamzin Hobday	5.9	262	276	277	289		
Scottish Socialist	Kevin McGregor	1.7	77	91	91			
Electorate: 8,328 Valid: 4,419 Spoilt: 131 Quota: 1,105 Turnout: 53.1%
