= 2017 East Ayrshire Council election =

East Ayrshire Council election

- 4 May 2017

All 32 seats to East Ayrshire Council 17 seats needed for a majority
- Registered: 94,375
- Turnout: 44.9%
	First party	Second party	Third party
Leader	Douglas Reid	Maureen McKay	Tom Cook
Party	SNP	Labour	Conservative
Leader's seat	Kilmarnock West and Crosshouse	Kilmarnock North	Kilmarnock West and Crosshouse
Last election	15 seats, 39.5%	14 seats, 41.4%	2 seats, 12.8%
Seats before	15	14	2
Seats won	14	9	6
Seat change	▼1	▼5	▲4
Popular vote	16,023	10,456	10,066
Percentage	38.5%	25.2%	24.2%
Swing	▼1.0%	▼16.2%	▲12.9%
	Fourth party	Fifth party
Leader	Sally Cogley	N/A
Party	Rubbish	Independent
Leader's seat	Irvine Valley	N/A
Last election	N/A	1 seat, 7.6%
Seats before	0	1
Seats won	1	2
Seat change	▲1	▲1
Popular vote	784	3,347
Percentage	1.9%	8.9%
Swing	New	▲1.3%
- The 9 multi-member wards
Council Leader before election
Douglas Reid
(SNP)
No overall control
Council Leader after election
Douglas Reid
(SNP)
No overall control

Elections to East Ayrshire Council took place on 4 May 2017 on the same day as the 31 other Scottish local government elections. As with other Scottish council elections, it was held using single transferable vote (STV) – a form of proportional representation – in which multiple candidates are elected in each ward and voters rank candidates in order of preference.

For the second consecutive election, the Scottish National Party (SNP) were returned as the largest party with 14 seats but remained shy of an overall majority. Labour lost further ground but were again returned as the second-largest party with nine seats. The Conservatives made several gains to return six councillors while The Rubbish Party – standing in their first election – won their first seat. Two independent candidates were also elected.

The SNP took over control of the council as a minority administration having previously run the council in coalition with the Conservatives following the previous election in 2012.

== Election result ==
2017 East Ayrshire local election result
Party	Seats	Gains	Losses	Net gain/loss	Seats %	Votes %	Votes	+/−
SNP	14	1	2	▼1	43.8	38.5	16,023	▼1.0
Labour	9	0	5	▼5	28.1	25.2	10,456	▼16.2
Conservative	6	5	1	▲4	18.8	24.21	10,066	▲13.0
Independent	2	1	0	▲1	6.3	9.0	3,347	▲1.3
Rubbish	1	1	0	▲1	3.1	1.9	784	New
Green	0	0	0	Steady	0.0	1.6	674	New
Scottish Libertarian	0	0	0	Steady	0.0	0.5	217	New
Total	32						41,567	

Note: "Votes" are the first preference votes. The net gain/loss and percentage changes relate to the result of the previous Scottish local elections on 3 May 2012. This may differ from other published sources showing gain/loss relative to seats held at dissolution of Scotland's councils.

=== Seats changing hands ===
Seat	2012		2017	
Seat	Party	Member	Party	Member
Annick	SNP	Eoghann MacColl	SNP	Gordon Jenkins
Annick		Ward increased from 3 to 4	Conservative	John McFadzean
Kilmarnock North	SNP	Elaine Cowan	Conservative	Ian Grant
Kilmarnock East and Hurlford	Labour	Gordon Cree	Labour	Barry Douglas
Kilmarnock East and Hurlford	Labour	Drew McIntyre	Conservative	Jon Herd
Kilmarnock South	SNP	Hugh Ross	SNP	Claire Maitland
Irvine Valley	Conservative	John McFadzean	The Rubbish Party	Sally Cogley
Irvine Valley	SNP	Bobby McDill		Ward decreased from 4 to 3
Ballochmyle	SNP	Stephanie Primrose	SNP	Claire Leitch
Ballochmyle	Labour	David Shaw	Conservative	Alyson Simmons
Cumnock and New Cumnock	Labour	William Menzies	SNP	Jim McMahon
Cumnock and New Cumnock	Labour	Eric Ross	Conservative	Walter Young
Cumnock and New Cumnock	SNP	Kathy Morrice	SNP	Jacqui Todd
Doon Valley	Labour	Moira Pirie	Independent	Drew Filson

== Ward summary ==
Results of the 2017 East Ayrshire Council election by ward
Ward	%	Cllrs	%	Cllrs	%	Cllrs	%	Cllrs	%	Cllrs	%	Cllrs	%	Cllrs	Total Cllrs
Ward	SNP		Labour		Conservative		Rubbish		Green		Libertarian		Independents		Total Cllrs
Annick	32.32	1	13.51	1	36.77	1			4.42	0	0.11	0	12.83	1	4
Kilmarnock North	49.79	1	23.13	1	25.96	1					1.09	0			3
Kilmarnock West and Crosshouse	40.59	2	23.49	1	31.27	1			3.84	0	1.09	0			4
Kilmarnock East and Hurlford	45.14	2	26.35	1	21.6	1					0.78	0	6.1	0	4
Kilmarnock South	54.65	2	32.89	1	11.71	0					0.73	0			3
Irvine Valley	36.29	1	16.75	1	19.88	0	16.94	1			0.3	0	9.8	0	3
Ballochmyle	30.96	2	28.87	1	20.1	1					0.32	0	13.22	0	4
Cumnock and New Cumnock	30.74	2	35.27	1	22.21	1			2.84	0	0.6	0	8.31	0	4
Doon Valley	25.16	1	34.06	1	18.33	0			1.39	0	0.1	0	20.92	1	3
Total	38.54	14	25.15	9	18.75	6	1.88	1	1.62	0	0.52	0	8.95	2	32

== Ward results ==
=== Annick ===
Following the Fifth Statutory Review of Electoral Arrangements, Annick was increased from a three-member ward to a four-member ward. The SNP, Labour and independent candidate Ellen Freel retained the seats they had won at the previous election while the Conservatives won the extra seat.

Annick - 4 members
Party	Candidate	FPv%	Count					
Party	Candidate	FPv%	1	2	3	4	5	6
Conservative	John McFadzean (Note: Sitting councillor for Irvine Valley.)	36.8	2,277					
SNP	Gordon Jenkins	17.4	1,076	1,097	1,098	1,098	1,161	1,993
SNP	Eòghann MacColl (incumbent)	14.9	925	947	948	949	1,005	
Labour	John McGhee (incumbent)	13.5	837	1,078	1,088	1,100	1,154	1,207
Independent	Ellen Freel (incumbent)	12.5	775	1,013	1,021	1,056	1,162	1,224
Green	Jen Broadhurst	4.4	274	326	328	334		
Independent	Gordon Walker	0.3	20	61	66			
Scottish Libertarian	Amrik Singh	0.1	7	22				
Electorate: 11,761 Valid: 6,191 Spoilt: 63 Quota: 1,239 Turnout: 53.2%

=== Kilmarnock North ===
Labour retained their only seat while the SNP retained one of their two seats and the Conservatives gained one seat from the SNP.

Kilmarnock North - 3 members
Party	Candidate	FPv%	Count				
Party	Candidate	FPv%	1	2	3	4	5
SNP	Helen Coffey (incumbent)	36.9	1,381				
Conservative	Ian Grant	26.0	971				
Labour	Maureen McKay (incumbent)	23.1	865	885	900	924	1,300
SNP	Elaine Cowan (incumbent)	12.9	481	884	886	893	
Scottish Libertarian	Lisa Murray	1.1	41	44	47		
Electorate: 9,109 Valid: 3,739 Spoilt: 40 Quota: 935 Turnout: 41.5%

=== Kilmarnock West and Crosshouse ===
The SNP (2), Labour and the Conservatives retained the seats they had won at the previous election.

Kilmarnock West and Crosshouse - 4 members
Party	Candidate	FPv%	Count
Party	Candidate	FPv%	1
Conservative	Tom Cook (incumbent)	31.3	1,789
Labour	Lillian Jones (incumbent)	23.5	1,344
SNP	Iain Linton (incumbent)	20.5	1,171
SNP	Douglas Reid (incumbent)	20.1	1,152
Green	Elizabeth Brown	3.8	220
Scottish Libertarian	Stef Johnstone	0.8	45
Electorate: 12,631 Valid: 5,721 Spoilt: 88 Quota: 1,145 Turnout: 46%

=== Kilmarnock East and Hurlford ===
The SNP retained both the seats they had won at the previous election while Labour retained one of their two seats and the Conservatives gained one seat from Labour.

Kilmarnock East and Hurlford - 4 members
Party	Candidate	FPv%	Count						
Party	Candidate	FPv%	1	2	3	4	5	6	7
SNP	Fiona Campbell (incumbent)	28.8	1,459						
Conservative	Jon Herd	21.6	1,094						
Labour	Barry Douglas	16.9	856	867	906	923	933	1,007	1,513
SNP	John Campbell (incumbent)	16.3	827	1,232					
Labour	Dave Meechan	9.5	479	485	500	510	517	609	
Independent	Raymond Pattison	6.1	309	313	347	363	383		
Scottish Libertarian	Stephen McNamara	0.8	40	41	54	60			
Electorate: 12,244 Valid: 5,064 Spoilt: 129 Quota: 1,013 Turnout: 42.4%

=== Kilmarnock South ===
The SNP (2) and Labour retained the seats they had won at the previous election.

Kilmarnock South - 3 members
Party	Candidate	FPv%	Count	
Party	Candidate	FPv%	1	2
SNP	Jim Todd (incumbent)	36.5	1,190	
Labour	John Knapp (incumbent)	32.9	1,073	
SNP	Clare Maitland	18.2	593	914
Conservative	Billy McClure	11.7	382	387
Scottish Libertarian	Caitlin O'Brien	0.7	24	29
Electorate: 8,028 Valid: 3,262 Spoilt: 62 Quota: 816 Turnout: 41.4%

=== Irvine Valley ===
Following the Fifth Statutory Reviews of Electoral Arrangements, Irvine Valley was reduced in size from a four-member ward to a three-member ward. The SNP retained one of the two seats they had won at the previous election while Labour retained their only seat. The Conservatives lost their only seat and the Rubbish Party won a council seat for the first time.

Irvine Valley - 3 seats
Party	Candidate	FPv%	Count						
Party	Candidate	FPv%	1	2	3	4	5	6	7
SNP	Elena Whitham (incumbent)	24.4	1,128	1,131	1,132	1,179			
Conservative	Susan McFadzean	19.9	920	921	922	964	964	989	
Rubbish	Sally Cogley	16.9	784	788	792	888	889	1,036	1,403
Labour	George Mair (incumbent)	16.8	775	778	780	879	880	991	1,233
SNP	Margaret Young	11.9	551	551	551	587	605		
Independent	Ian King	9.5	438	438	444				
Independent	David Gartland	0.3	16	16					
Scottish Libertarian	Stevie Brannagan	0.3	14						
Electorate: 9,677 Valid: 4,626 Spoilt: 71 Quota: 1,157 Turnout: 48.5%

=== Ballochmyle ===
The SNP retained both the seats they had won at the previous election while Labour retained one of their two seats and the Conservatives gained one seat from Labour.

Ballochmyle - 4 seats
Party	Candidate	FPv%	Count						
Party	Candidate	FPv%	1	2	3	4	5	6	7
SNP	Claire Leitch	20.7	971						
Conservative	Alyson Simmons	20.1	944						
Labour	Neil McGhee (incumbent)	18.6	873	875	875	880	1,233		
SNP	Jim Roberts (incumbent)	16.8	788	813	813	816	854	895	1,107
Independent	David Shaw (incumbent)	13.2	621	621	622	627	671	734	
Labour	Neil Murray	10.3	483	483	484	485			
Scottish Libertarian	Sheraz Shafiq	0.3	15	15	15				
Electorate: 11,270 Valid: 4,695 Spoilt: 138 Quota: 940 Turnout: 42.9%

=== Cumnock and New Cumnock ===
Labour retained one of the three seats they won at the previous election while the SNP retained their only seat and both the SNP and the Conservatives gained one seat from Labour.

Cumnock and New Cumnock - 4 seats
Party	Candidate	FPv%	Count						
Party	Candidate	FPv%	1	2	3	4	5	6	7
Labour	Billy Crawford (incumbent)	28.7	1,279						
Conservative	Walter Young	22.2	991						
SNP	Jacqui Todd	16.4	731	740	743	745	773	831	898
SNP	Jim McMahon	14.4	641	656	659	660	684	743	812
Independent	Jessie Owens	8.3	371	390	411	418	461		
Labour	Carol Ann Mochan	6.6	295	577	599	605	626	736	
Green	Peter Black	2.8	127	136	143	149			
Scottish Libertarian	Gordon Bircham	0.6	27	28	32				
Electorate: 10,735 Valid: 4,462 Spoilt: 137 Quota: 893 Turnout: 42.8%

=== Doon Valley ===
The SNP retained their only seat while Labour retained one of their two seats and independent candidate Drew Filson gained a seat from Labour.

Doon Valley - 3 seats
Party	Candidate	FPv%	Count								
Party	Candidate	FPv%	1	2	3	4	5	6	7	8	9
Labour	Elaine Dinwoodie (incumbent)	21.0	801	801	807	828	848	1,182			
Conservative	Alison Harper	18.3	698	699	701	718	721	737	756	757	
Independent	Drew Filson	15.5	590	590	596	685	693	777	838	844	1,066
SNP	John Bell (incumbent)	15.3	583	583	592	602	935	950	972		
Labour	Elaine Stewart	13.0	496	496	502	522	526				
SNP	Anne Fairlie	9.9	375	375	390	399					
Independent	John Young	5.4	207	208	213						
Green	Craig Murray	1.4	53	54							
Scottish Libertarian	Mark Mitchell	0.1	4								
Electorate: 8,920 Valid: 3,807 Spoilt: 76 Quota: 952 Turnout: 43.5%
