= 2012 East Ayrshire Council election =

2012 Scottish local government election

- 3 May 2012

All 32 seats to East Ayrshire Council 17 seats needed for a majority
- Registered: 92,817
- Turnout: 40.4%
	First party	Second party	Third party
Leader	Douglas Reid	Maureen McKay	Tom Cook
Party	SNP	Labour	Conservative
Leader's seat	Kilmarnock West and Crosshouse	Kilmarnock North	Kilmarnock West and Crosshouse
Last election	14 seats, 39.2%	14 seats, 41.1%	3 seats, 12.8%
Seats before	14	15	3
Seats won	15	14	2
Seat change	▲1	Steady	▼1
Popular vote	14,518	15,190	4,134
Percentage	39.5	41.4	11.3
Swing	▲0.3%	▲0.3%	▼1.5%
- The 9 multi-member wards
Council Leader before election
Douglas Reid
SNP
Council Leader after election
Douglas Reid
SNP

Elections to East Ayrshire Council were held on 3 May 2012, the same day as the other Scottish local government elections. The election is the second using 9 new wards created as a result of the Local Governance (Scotland) Act 2004, each ward elected three or four councillors using the single transferable vote system form of proportional representation. The new wards replaced 32 single-member wards which used the plurality (first past the post) system of election.

== Election result ==
2012 East Ayrshire local election result
Party	Seats	Gains	Losses	Net gain/loss	Seats %	Votes %	Votes	+/−
SNP	15	1	0	▲1	46.9	39.5	14,518	▲0.3
Labour	14	1	1	Steady	43.8	41.4	15,190	▲0.3
Conservative	2	0	1	▼1	6.3	11.3	4,134	▼1.5
Independent	1	1	1	Steady	3.1	7.6	2,806	▲2.5
Liberal Democrats	0	0	0	Steady	0.0	0.2	68	New
Total	32						36,716	

Note: "Votes" are the first preference votes. The net gain/loss and percentage changes relate to the result of the previous Scottish local elections on 3 May 2007. This may differ from other published sources showing gain/loss relative to seats held at dissolution of Scotland's councils.

=== Seats changing hands ===
Seat	2007		2012	
Seat	Party	Member	Party	Member
Annick	Conservative	Rose-Ann Cunninghame	Independent	Ellen Freel
Ballochmyle	Labour	Jimmy Kelly	SNP	Stephanie Primrose
Doon Valley	Independent	Jim Sutherland	Labour	Elaine Dinwoodie

== Ward summary ==
Results of the 2012 East Ayrshire Council election by ward
Ward	%	Cllrs	%	Cllrs	%	Cllrs	%	Cllrs	%	Cllrs	Total Cllrs
Ward	SNP		Labour		Conservative		Lib Dem		Independent		Total Cllrs
Annick		1		1		0		0		1	3
Kilmarnock North		2		1		0					3
Kilmarnock West and Crosshouse		2		1		1				0	4
Kilmarnock East and Hurlford		2		2		0					4
Kilmarnock South		2		1		0					3
Irvine Valley		2		1		1				0	4
Ballochmyle		2		2		0					4
Cumnock and New Cumnock		1		3		0				0	4
Doon Valley		1		2		0				0	3
Total		15		14		2		0		1	32

== Ward results ==
=== Annick ===
The SNP and Labour retained the seats they had won at the previous election while independent candidate Ellen Freel gained a seat from the Conservatives

Annick – 3 members
Party	Candidate	FPv%	Count					
Party	Candidate	FPv%	1	2	3	4	5	6
Labour	John McGhee (incumbent)	24.4	1,021	1,032	1,060			
SNP	Eòghann MacColl	22.7	947	957	1,327			
Conservative	Rose-Ann Cunninghame (incumbent)	20.9	873	886	907	941	943	
Independent	Ellen Freel	19.4	810	827	858	960	965	1,394
SNP	John MacKay (incumbent)	11.0	461	465				
Liberal Democrats	Greg Foster	1.6	68					
Electorate: 9,497 Valid: 4,180 Spoilt: 57 Quota: 1,046 Turnout: 44.0%

=== Kilmarnock North ===
The SNP (2) and Labour retained the seats they won at the previous election.

Kilmarnock North – 3 members
Party	Candidate	FPv%	Count		
Party	Candidate	FPv%	1	2	3
SNP	Helen Coffey (incumbent)	44.7	1,475		
Labour	Maureen McKay (incumbent)	35.7	1,176		
Conservative	Ian Grant	11.6	383	417	476
SNP	Andrew Hershaw (Note: Kilmarnock North councillor Andrew Hershaw died on 31 December 2013. A by-election was held on 27 March 2014.)	8.0	263	817	921
Electorate: 9,324 Valid: 3,297 Spoilt: 40 Quota: 825 Turnout: 35.4%

=== Kilmarnock West and Crosshouse ===
The SNP (2), Labour and the Conservatives retained the seats they had won at the previous election.

Kilmarnock West and Crosshouse – 4 members
Party	Candidate	FPv%	Count					
Party	Candidate	FPv%	1	2	3	4	5	6
SNP	Iain Linton (incumbent)	24.3	1,210					
SNP	Douglas Reid (incumbent)	20.7	1,032					
Labour	Lillian Jones	20.6	1,025					
Conservative	Tom Cook (incumbent)	16.6	828	864	869	870	980	1,171
Labour	Dave Meechan	10.4	516	554	559	582	709	
Independent	Andi McCann	7.5	375	417	423	424		
Electorate: 12,199 Valid: 4,986 Spoilt: 136 Quota: 998 Turnout: 40.9%

=== Kilmarnock East and Hurlford ===
The SNP (2) and Labour (2) retained the seats they had won at the previous election.

Kilmarnock East and Hurlford – 4 members
Party	Candidate	FPv%	Count
Party	Candidate	FPv%	1
SNP	John Campbell (incumbent)	25.4	1,126
Labour	Gordon Cree (incumbent)	23.8	1,054
Labour	Drew McIntyre (incumbent)	22.2	984
SNP	James Buchanan (incumbent) (Note: Kilmarnock East and Hurlford councillor James Buchanan died on 28 October 2016 after a short illness. A by-election was held on 26 January 2017.)	21.3	944
Conservative	Rob Murray	7.4	326
Electorate: 11,311 Valid: 4,434 Spoilt: 142 Quota: 887 Turnout: 39.2%

=== Kilmarnock South ===
The SNP (2) and Labour retained the seats they had won at the previous election.

Kilmarnock South – 3 members
Party	Candidate	FPv%	Count			
Party	Candidate	FPv%	1	2	3	4
Labour	John Knapp (incumbent)	37.6	1,250			
SNP	Jim Todd (incumbent)	23.8	791	814	822	949
SNP	Hugh Ross (incumbent)	22.1	735	759	789	924
Labour	Ronnie Scott	12.5	417	743	785	
Conservative	Alyson Holden	4.1	135	138		
Electorate: 8,288 Valid: 3,328 Spoilt: 93 Quota: 833 Turnout: 40.2%

=== Irvine Valley ===
The SNP (2), Labour and the Conservatives retained the seats they had won at the previous election.

Irvine Valley – 4 seats
Party	Candidate	FPv%	Count				
Party	Candidate	FPv%	1	2	3	4	5
Labour	George Mair	29.7	1,423				
SNP	Alan Brown (incumbent) (Note: Irvine Valley councillor Alan Brown was elected as MP for Kilmarnock and Loudoun on 7 May 2015. He resigned his council seat on 17 July 2015 and a by-election was held on 1 October 2015.)	26.1	1,252				
Conservative	John McFadzean	17.9	857	896	940	942	1,188
SNP	Bobby McDill (incumbent)	17.7	847	961			
Independent	May Anderson	7.1	339	451	541	547	
Electorate: 11,401 Valid: 4,718 Spoilt: 72 Quota: 944 Turnout: 41.4%

=== Ballochmyle ===
Labour retained two of the three seats they had won at the previous election while the SNP held their only seat and gained one seat from Labour.

Ballochmyle – 4 seats
Party	Candidate	FPv%	Count					
Party	Candidate	FPv%	1	2	3	4	5	6
SNP	Jim Roberts (incumbent)	25.4	1,109					
Labour	Neil McGhee (incumbent)	23.3	1,018					
Labour	David Shaw (incumbent)	18.5	810	827	857			
Labour	Neil Murray	11.3	496	510	622	628	704	
SNP	Stephanie Primrose	10.6	462	665	670	671	735	869
Conservative	Nick Martin	8.0	348	352	353	354		
Electorate: 10,995 Valid: 4,243 Spoilt: 131 Quota: 849 Turnout: 38.6%

=== Cumnock and New Cumnock ===
Labour (3) and the SNP retained the seats that they had won at the previous election.

Cumnock and New Cumnock – 4 seats
Party	Candidate	FPv%	Count							
Party	Candidate	FPv%	1	2	3	4	5	6	7	8
Labour	Eric Ross (incumbent)	23.8	987							
SNP	Kathy Morrice (incumbent)	21.6	894							
Labour	Barney Menzies (incumbent)	19.5	809	892						
Labour	Billy Crawford (incumbent)	14.8	612	672	677	741	744	763	800	945
Independent	Ian Allan	7.4	308	310	311	314	352	409	475	
Conservative	James Boswell	5.0	206	208	209	210	215			
SNP	Craig Murray	4.3	180	185	253	255	258	286		
Independent	David Fraser	1.4	59	62	63	64				
Electorate: 10,947 Valid: 4,055 Spoilt: 89 Quota: 812 Turnout: 37.0%

=== Doon Valley ===
The SNP and Labour retained the seats they had won at the previous election while Labour gained one seat from independent councillor Jim Sutherland. In 2007, independent candidate Drew Filson was elected as an SNP councillor but subsequently left the party. A by-election held following the death of Cllr Sutherland in 2009 was won by Labour.

Doon Valley – 3 seats
Party	Candidate	FPv%	Count					
Party	Candidate	FPv%	1	2	3	4	5	6
Labour	Elaine Dinwoodie (incumbent)	33.1	1,171					
SNP	John Bell	22.3	790	812	832	950		
Independent	Ian Borthwick	13.8	488	501	540	680	708	
Independent	Drew Filson (incumbent)	12.1	427	465	491			
Labour	Moira Pirie (incumbent)	11.9	421	590	613	719	734	984
Conservative	Irene Grant	5.0	178	181				
Electorate: 8,855 Valid: 3,475 Spoilt: 61 Quota: 869 Turnout: 39.2%

== By-elections from 2012–2017 ==
=== Kilmarnock North ===
Kilmarnock North by-election (27 March 2014) – 1 seat
Party	Candidate	FPv%	Count			
Party	Candidate	FPv%	1	2	3	4
SNP	Elaine Cowan	44.2	1,334	1,358	1,473	2,042
Labour	Scott Thomson	37.4	1,130	1,147	1,320	
Conservative	Ian Grant	16.3	493	501		
Green	Robin Tatler	2.0	61			
Electorate: 9,657 Valid: 3,018 Spoilt: 19 Quota: 1,510 Turnout: 35.6%

=== Irvine Valley ===
Irvine Valley by-election (1 October 2015) – 1 seat
Party	Candidate	FPv%	Count	
Party	Candidate	FPv%	1	2
SNP	Elena Whitham	49.8	1,797	1,832
Conservative	Susan McFadzean	24.5	865	884
Labour	Alex Walsh	23.8	860	884
Green	Jen Broadhurst	2.4	88	
Electorate: 11,570 Valid: 3,610 Spoilt: 42 Quota: 1,805 Turnout: 31.2%

=== Kilmarnock East and Hurlford ===
Kilmarnock East and Hurlford by-election (26 January 2017) – 1 seat
Party	Candidate	FPv%	Count		
Party	Candidate	FPv%	1	2	3
SNP	Fiona Campbell	48.7	1,461	1,471	1,531
Labour	Dave Meechem	29.4	881	893	1,122
Conservative	Jon Herd	20.1	602	608	
Scottish Libertarian	Stephen McNamara	1.8	53		
Electorate: 11,266 Valid: 2,997 Spoilt: 33 Quota: 1,449 Turnout: 26.6%
