= Kilmarnock West and Crosshouse (ward) =

Electoral ward of East Ayrshire, Scotland

- East Ayrshire
- Boundary of Kilmarnock West and Crosshouse in East Ayrshire from 2007–2017.
- Population: 17,739 (2021)
- Electorate: 13,260 (2024)
- Major settlements: Bonnyton; Crosshouse; Kilmarnock (part of)
- Scottish Parliament constituency: Kilmarnock and Irvine Valley
- Scottish Parliament region: South Scotland
- UK Parliament constituency: Kilmarnock and Loudon

Current ward
- Created: 2007
- Number of councillors: 4
- Councillor: James Adams (Conservative)
- Councillor: Ian Linton (SNP)
- Councillor: Douglas Reid (SNP)
- Councillor: Jayne Sangster (Labour)
- Created from: Altonhill, Hillhead and Longpark; Crosshouse, Gatehead and Knockentiber; Grange and Howard; Kilmarnock Central East; Kilmarnock Central South; Kilmarnock Central West; North New Farm Loch and Dean; Riccarton

Kilmarnock West and Crosshouse is one of the nine electoral wards of East Ayrshire Council. Created in 2007, the ward elects four councillors using the single transferable vote electoral system and covers an area with a population of 17,739 people.

The area is a Scottish National Party (SNP) stronghold with the party holding half the seats at every election since the creation of the ward.

== Boundaries ==
The ward was created following the Fourth Statutory Reviews of Electoral Arrangements ahead of the 2007 Scottish local elections. As a result of the Local Governance (Scotland) Act 2004, local elections in Scotland would use the single transferable vote electoral system from 2007 onwards so Kilmarnock West and Crosshouse was formed from an amalgamation of several previous first-past-the-post wards. It contains all of the former Crosshouse, Gatehead and Knockentiber, Kilmarnock Central West and Grange and Howard wards as well as parts of the former Altonhill, Hillhead and Longpark, Kilmarnock Central East, Kilmarnock Central South, North New Farm Loch and Dean and Riccarton wards.

Kilmarnock West and Crosshouse includes the westernmost part of the council area between its borders with North Ayrshire and South Ayrshire and takes in the towns of Crosshouse, Gatehead and Knockentiber as well as the neighbourhoods of Hillhead, Bonnyton, Grange and Howard in Kilmarnock. Following the Fifth Statutory Reviews of Electoral Arrangements ahead of the 2017 Scottish local elections, the ward's boundaries were not changed.

== Councillors ==
Election	Councillors			
2007	Ian Linton (SNP)	Douglas Reid (SNP)	Robert Keohone (Labour)	Tom Cook (Conservative)
2012	Ian Linton (SNP)	Douglas Reid (SNP)	Lillian Jones (Labour)	Tom Cook (Conservative)
2017	Ian Linton (SNP)	Douglas Reid (SNP)	Lillian Jones (Labour)	Tom Cook (Conservative)
2022	Ian Linton (SNP)	Douglas Reid (SNP)	Lillian Jones (Labour)	James Adams (Conservative)
2024	Ian Linton (SNP)	Douglas Reid (SNP)	Jayne Sangster (Labour)	James Adams (Conservative)

== Election results ==
=== 2024 by-election ===
Kilmarnock West and Crosshouse by-election (14 November 2024) – 1 seat
Party	Candidate	FPv%	Count				
Party	Candidate	FPv%	1	2	3	4	5
Labour	Jayne Sangster	39.4	1,213	1,225	1,276	1,468	1,935
SNP	Marie Robertson	33.3	1,025	1,032	1,060	1,127	
Conservative	Allan MacDonald	20.2	623	635	675		
Liberal Democrats	Lee Manley	38.1	145	162			
Independent	Stephen McNamara	2.4	75				
Electorate: 13,260 Valid: 3,081 Spoilt: 28 Quota: 1,541 Turnout: 23.4%

=== 2022 election ===
Kilmarnock West and Crosshouse – 4 seats
Party	Candidate	FPv%	Count			
Party	Candidate	FPv%	1	2	3	4
Labour	Lillian Jones (incumbent)	28.2	1,662			
Conservative	James Adams	22.0	1,297			
SNP	Iain Linton (incumbent)	19.8	1,168	1,219		
SNP	Douglas Reid (incumbent)	18.6	1,093	1,142	1,149	1,182
Independent	Frank McNiff	6.3	369	475	516	517
Green	Elizabeth Brown	3.9	228	299	308	312
Alba	Guy Njali Bola	1.2	71	81	82	83
Electorate: 13,347 Valid: 5,888 Spoilt: 70 Quota: 1,178 Turnout: 44.6%

=== 2017 election ===
Kilmarnock West and Crosshouse - 4 members
Party	Candidate	FPv%	Count
Party	Candidate	FPv%	1
Conservative	Tom Cook (incumbent)	31.3	1,789
Labour	Lillian Jones (incumbent)	23.5	1,344
SNP	Iain Linton (incumbent)	20.5	1,171
SNP	Douglas Reid (incumbent)	20.1	1,152
Green	Elizabeth Brown	3.8	220
Scottish Libertarian	Stef Johnstone	0.8	45
Electorate: 12,631 Valid: 5,721 Spoilt: 88 Quota: 1,145 Turnout: 46%

=== 2012 election ===
Kilmarnock West and Crosshouse – 4 members
Party	Candidate	FPv%	Count					
Party	Candidate	FPv%	1	2	3	4	5	6
SNP	Iain Linton (incumbent)	24.3	1,210					
SNP	Douglas Reid (incumbent)	20.7	1,032					
Labour	Lillian Jones	20.6	1,025					
Conservative	Tom Cook (incumbent)	16.6	828	864	869	870	980	1,171
Labour	Dave Meechan	10.4	516	554	559	582	709	
Independent	Andi McCann	7.5	375	417	423	424		
Electorate: 12,199 Valid: 4,986 Spoilt: 136 Quota: 998 Turnout: 40.9%

=== 2007 election ===
Kilmarnock West and Crosshouse - 4 members
Party	Candidate	FPv%	Count					
Party	Candidate	FPv%	1	2	3	4	5	6
SNP	Iain Linton	25.1	1,656					
SNP	Douglas Reid	22.1	1,454					
Labour	Robert Keohone	19.4	1,280	1,315	1,330			
Conservative	Tom Cook	17.0	1,118	1,118	1,209	1,209	1,308	1,578
Labour	Brian Reeves	13.1	866	901	917	925	978	
Independent	Shirley-Anne Weir	3.3	220	263	280	281		
Electorate: 11,833 Valid: 6,594 Spoilt: 182 Quota: 1,319 Turnout: 55.7%
