= Alan Brown (Scottish politician) =

Scottish National Party politician

Alan Brown MSP
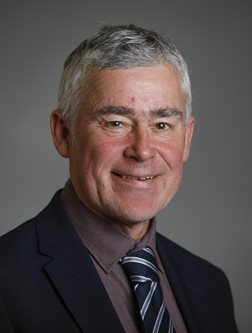
- Official portrait, 2026

Member of the Scottish Parliament for Kilmarnock and Irvine Valley
- Incumbent
- Assumed office 7 May 2026
- Preceded by: Willie Coffey
- Majority: 4,461 (15.3%)

Member of Parliament for Kilmarnock and Loudoun
- In office 7 May 2015 – 30 May 2024
- Preceded by: Cathy Jamieson
- Succeeded by: Lillian Jones
Party Political Offices
SNP Spokesperson for Energy Security and Net Zero in the House of Commons (Note: SNP Spokesperson for Energy and Industrial Strategy from 2022 to 2023)
In office 4 September 2023 – 30 May 2024
Leader	Stephen Flynn
Preceded by	Stephen Flynn
Succeeded by	Dave Doogan
SNP Spokesperson for Energy and Climate Change in the House of Commons
Incumbent
Assumed office 7 January 2020
Leader	Ian Blackford
Preceded by	Callum McCaig
Succeeded by	Himself (Energy and Industrial Strategy)
SNP Spokesperson for Transport in the House of Commons
In office 20 June 2017 – 7 January 2020
Leader	Ian Blackford
Preceded by	Office established
Succeeded by	Gavin Newlands
SNP Spokesperson for Infrastructure and Energy in the House of Commons
In office 20 June 2017 – 1 July 2018
Leader	Ian Blackford
Preceded by	Drew Hendry
Succeeded by	Ronnie Cowan

Personal details
- Born: 12 August 1970 (age 56) Newmilns, Ayrshire, Scotland
- Party: Scottish National Party
- Children: 2 sons
- Education: University of Glasgow
- Website: Official website

Alan Brown (born 12 August 1970) is a Scottish National Party (SNP) politician who has served as the Member of the Scottish Parliament (MSP) for Kilmarnock and Irvine Valley since 2026. He was previously the Member of Parliament (MP) for Kilmarnock and Loudoun from 2015 until 2024. Brown previously served as the SNP spokesperson for Energy and Transport in the House of Commons. Brown was the candidate for the Scottish Parliamentary constituency Kilmarnock and Irvine Valley ahead of the 2026 Scottish Parliament election, winning the election with a 4,461 majority.

== Early life and career ==
Alan Brown was born on 12 August 1970 to parents Eric and Irene in Kilmarnock; Brown has lived there all his life. He attended his local primary school and Loudoun Academy. He subsequently attended Glasgow University, where he graduated with an honours degree in civil engineering. After university Brown worked as a civil engineer in both the public and private sectors.

He was first elected as a SNP councillor in the 2007 East Ayrshire Council election for the Irvine Valley ward, topping the poll with 1,497 first preferences. He was re-elected in the 2012 East Ayrshire Council election, taking the second seat on this occasion with 1,252 first preferences but again exceeding the quota. A senior figure in the SNP delegation, he has held positions in Housing and Strategic Planning & Resources.

== Member of Parliament (2015–2024) ==
=== Election and tenure ===
At the 2015 general election, Brown was elected to Parliament as MP for Kilmarnock and Loudon with 55.7% of the vote and a majority of 13,638. He made his maiden speech on 22 June, in which he quoted the poem Is There for Honest Poverty by Robert Burns.

Brown has revealed that Hansard reporters in Parliament often ask him to provide written 'translations'' of his questions to the Commons due to his thick Ayrshire accent being difficult to understand. Even so, he has said he would not alter his accent because his constituents "know me locally and know how I talk, they would actually question what was happening if my accent changed when I came down to Westminster".

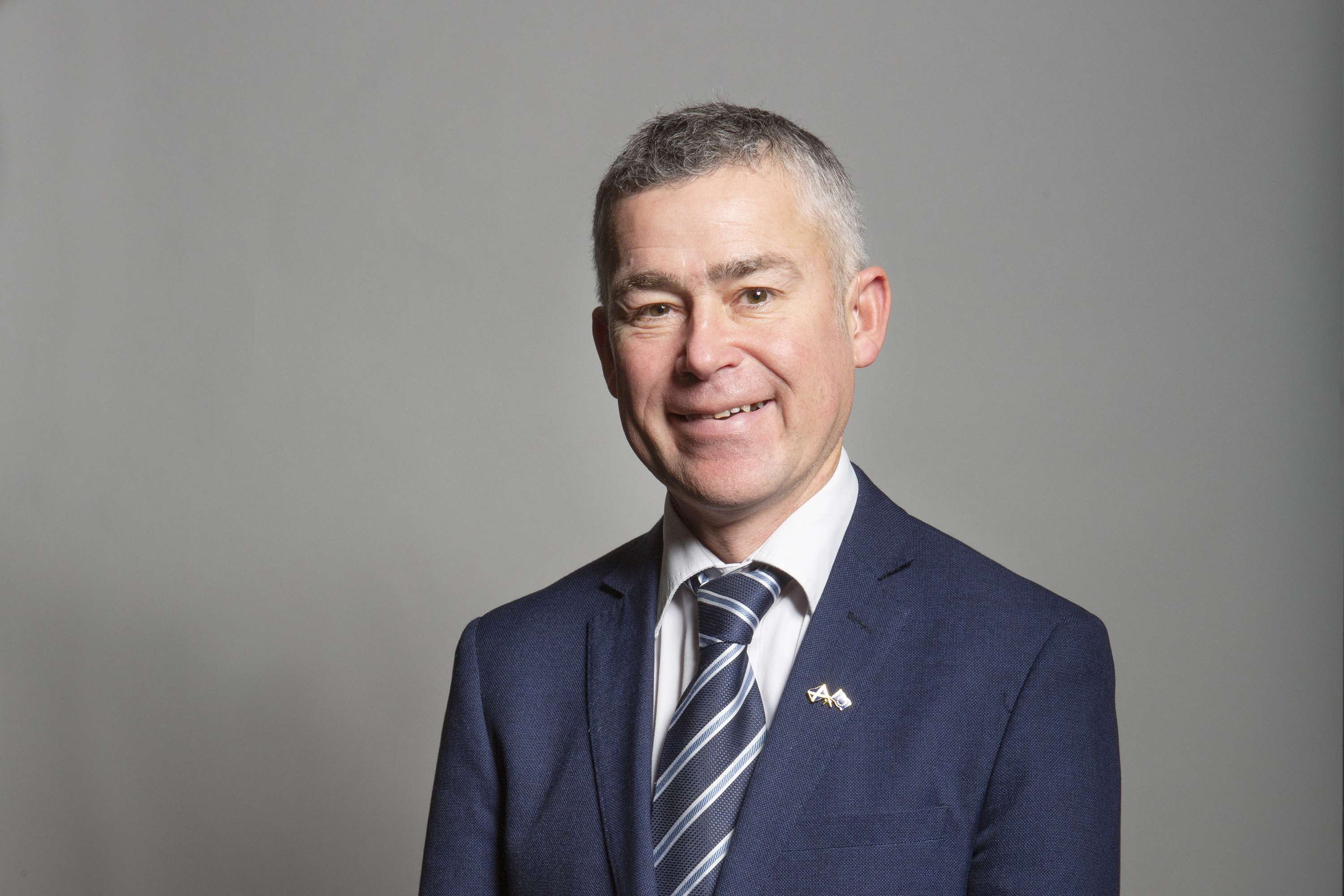
2019 Parliamentary portrait

Brown was re-elected as MP for Kilmarnock and Loudoun at the snap 2017 general election with a decreased vote share of 42.3% and a decreased majority of 6,269 votes. At the 2019 general election, Brown was again re-elected, with an increased vote share of 50.8% and an increased majority of 12,659.

Brown contested the Kilmarnock and Loudoun parliamentary constituency at the 2024 United Kingdom general election. He lost the seat, which he had held since 2015, to Scottish Labour candidate Lillian Jones, who won with a majority of 5,119 votes. At the election, Brown received 13,936 votes, in contrast to Jones' 19,055 votes.

=== Frontbench team ===
On 20 June 2017, Brown was appointed to the Frontbench Team of Ian Blackford as the SNP spokesperson on Transport, Infrastructure and Energy in the Palace of Westminster. In 2019 during a reshuffle, Brown was appointed to the role of SNP spokesperson on Energy and Climate Change by Iain Blackford. Brown also held the position of spokesperson for the SNP in Westminster for Transport, a position held from 2017 until 2020. Brown sat on the Business, Energy and Industrial Strategy Committee within the House of Commons until losing his seat at the 2024 general election.

== Scottish Parliament (2026–present) ==
=== Election ===
Brown was selected to be a candidate in the 2026 Scottish Parliament election in the Kilmarnock and Irvine Valley constituency after it was announced that the incumbent MSP, Willie Coffey, would not be seeking reelection to the seat, a position he has held since 2007. Brown won the election for the constituency, making the seat an SNP hold, with a majority of over 4,400. Brown was officially sworn in to the seventh session of the Scottish Parliament on 14 May 2026.

== Political views ==
In 2016, Brown was one of 58 Scottish MPs who voted against the renewal of the UK's Trident nuclear programme. He claimed the programme had not served as a deterrent and that each job created through it cost the UK taxpayer £6.5 million.

== Personal life ==
Brown is married and has two sons.

== Notes ==
Parliament of the United Kingdom
Preceded by Cathy Jamieson	Member of Parliament for Kilmarnock and Loudoun; 2015–2024	Succeeded by Lillian Jones
