= East Ayrshire Council =

Local government body in Scotland

East Ayrshire Council Comhairle Siorrachd Àir an Ear
- Coat of Arms

- Council logo

Leadership
- Provost: Claire Leitch, SNP since 31 October 2024
- Leader: Douglas Reid, SNP since 17 May 2007
- Chief Executive: Joe McLachlan since June 2026

Structure
- Seats: 32
- Graph of the party split among 32 seats.
- Political groups: Administration (14) SNP (14) Other parties (18) Labour (8) Conservative (4) Rubbish (1) Independent (5)

Elections
- Last election: 5 May 2022
- Next election: 6 May 2027

Meeting place
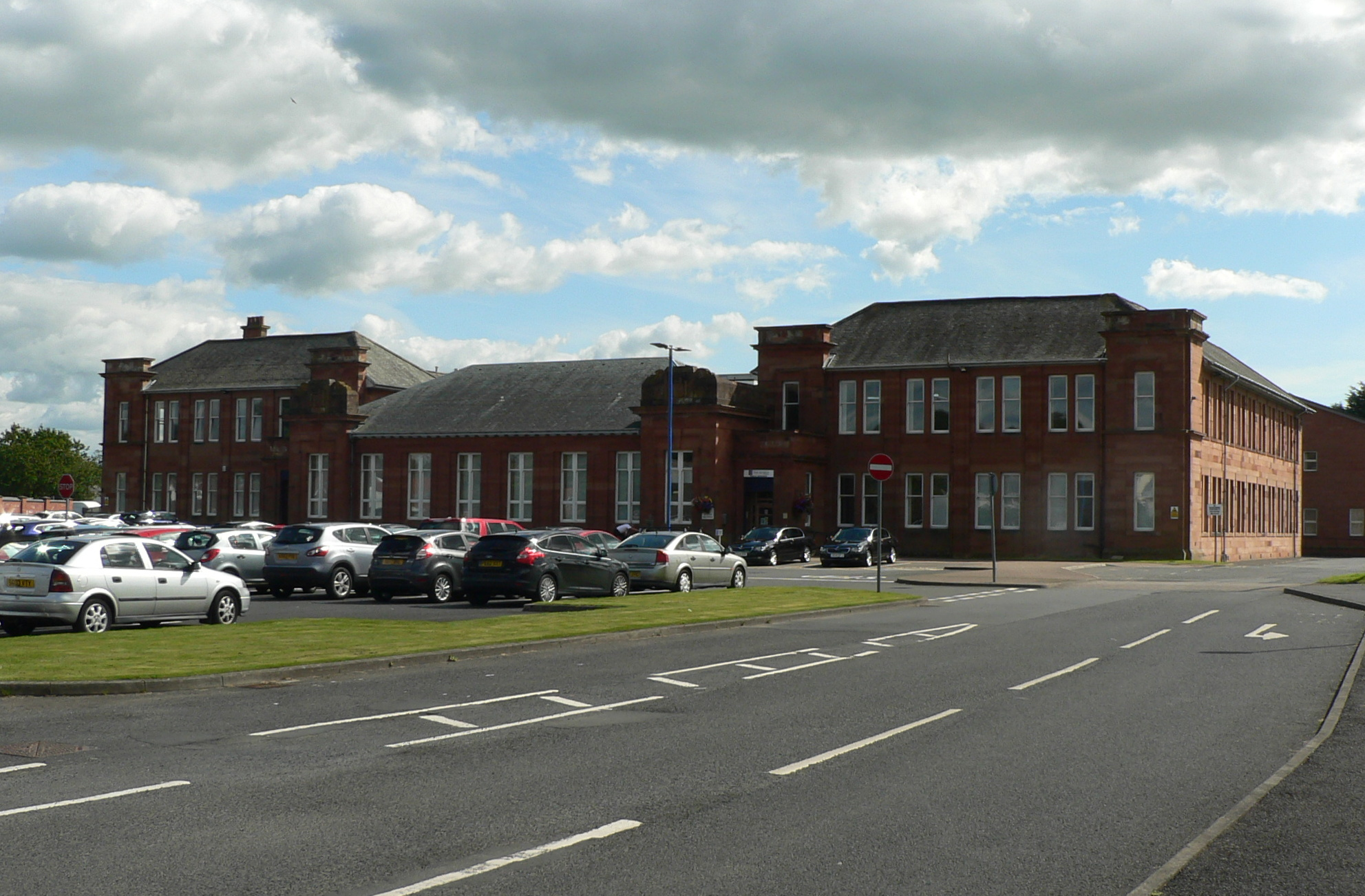
- Council Headquarters, London Road, Kilmarnock, KA3 7BU

Website
- www.east-ayrshire.gov.uk

East Ayrshire Council (Scottish Gaelic: Comhairle Siorrachd Àir an Ear) is the local authority for East Ayrshire, one of the 32 council areas of Scotland. It was created in 1996, and now comprises nine wards, each electing three or four local councillors through the single transferable vote system, creating a type of proportional representation. It is based at the Council Headquarters in Kilmarnock.

== History ==
East Ayrshire and its council were created in 1996 under the Local Government etc. (Scotland) Act 1994, which replaced Scotland's previous local government structure of upper-tier regions and lower-tier districts with unitary council areas providing all local government services. East Ayrshire covered the combined area of the abolished Kilmarnock and Loudoun and Cumnock and Doon Valley districts, and the new council also took over the functions of the abolished Strathclyde Regional Council within the area. The first elections were held in April 1995. The council acted as a shadow authority operating alongside the outgoing authorities until 1 April 1996 when the new areas and their councils formally came into being and the old districts and regions were abolished. The area's name references its location within the historic county of Ayrshire, which had been abolished for local government purposes in 1975 when Kilmarnock and Loudoun, Cumnock and Doon Valley, and Strathclyde region had been created.

== Coat of arms ==
The newly formed East Ayrshire Council adopted its own coat of arms, which appears on boundary signs and on the chains worn by the provost and depute provost. The top of the council's coat of arms features a black diamond to symbolise the area's history of coal mining. Next to the black diamond is a fir tree which represents the area's forestry, agriculture and rural landscape. Both components, the black diamonds and fir trees, were adopted from the former Cumnock and Doon Valley District Council's coat of arms. A red cog is situated next to the fir tree to symbolise the area's industry and industrial history.

The middle section of the coat of arms was lifted directly from the Boyds of Kilmarnock's coat of arms, which features blue wavy lines to symbolise the two river valleys within East Ayrshire - the Irvine Valley and the Doon Valley. The Campbells of Loudoun's coat of arms was incorporated in the bottom section of the coat of arms of East Ayrshire Council. The coat of arms of East Ayrshire Council is supported by a red squirrel, which was taken from the original Kilmarnock coat of arms, together with a lion rampant which was lifted from the coat of arms of the town of Cumnock. At the top features a coronet, a feature given to all landward councils in Scotland, whilst the council's motto, Forward Together, is featured at the bottom.

== Political control ==
The council has been under no overall control since 2007, with the Scottish National Party leading a variety of minority administrations since then.

The first election to East Ayrshire Council was held in 1995, initially operating as a shadow authority alongside the outgoing authorities until the new system came into force on 1 April 1996. Political control of the council since 1996 has been as follows:

Party in control	Years
Labour	1996–2007
No overall control	2007–

=== Leadership ===
The role of provost is largely ceremonial in East Ayrshire. They chair council meetings and act as the area's first citizen.

Political leadership is provided by the leader of the council. The first leader, David Sneller, had formerly been the leader of the old Cumnock and Doon Valley District Council. The leaders of East Ayrshire Council since 1996 have been:

Councillor	Party	From	To
David Sneller	Labour	1 Apr 1996	May 1999
Drew McIntyre	Labour	13 May 1999	May 2007
Douglas Reid	SNP	17 May 2007	

=== Composition ===
Following the 2022 election and subsequent changes up to October 2026, the composition of the council was:

Party	Seats
SNP	14
Labour	8
Conservative	4
Rubbish Party	1
Independent	5
Total	32

The next election is due in 2027.

== Elections ==
Since 2007 elections have been held every five years under the single transferable vote system, introduced by the Local Governance (Scotland) Act 2004. Election results since 1995 have been as follows:

Year	Seats	SNP	Labour	Conservative	Independent / Other	Notes
1995	30	8	22	0	0	Labour majority
1999	32	14	17	1	0	New ward boundaries. Labour majority
2003	32	8	23	1	0	Labour majority
2007	32	14	14	3	1	New ward boundaries.
2012	32	15	14	2	1	SNP / Conservative coalition
2017	32	14	9	6	2 (Note: One being from The Rubbish Party)	New ward boundaries. SNP minority administration
2022	32	14	10	4	4 (Note: One being from The Rubbish Party)	SNP minority administration

== Council Committees ==
East Ayrshire Council have a number of committees that support its work in delivering services to the population of East Ayrshire. Some committees, such as the Ayrshire Shared Services Joint Committee, also have representatives from South Ayrshire and North Ayrshire attending.

The current committees of East Ayrshire Council are;

- Ayrshire Economic Joint Committee
- Ayrshire Economic Partnership
- Audit and Performance Committee
- East Ayrshire Council Executive Committee
- Appeals Panel
- Ayrshire Shared Services Joint Committee (with South Ayrshire Council and North Ayrshire Council)
- Cabinet
- Community Planning Partnership Board
- Council
- East Ayrshire Integration Joint Board
- East Ayrshire Strategic Planning Group
- Governance & Scrutiny Committee
- Grants Committee
- JCC Central
- JNC for Teaching Staff
- Licensing Forum
- Local Government Licensing Panel
- Local Review Body
- Planning Committee
- Police and Fire and Rescue Committee
- Recruitment Panel

== Premises ==
The council's main offices are at Council Headquarters on London Road, Kilmarnock. The building was built as the James Hamilton School, which was designed by William Reid, the Ayrshire county architect, and opened in 1933. The school relocated to a new site in 1977 and the buildings became the London Road Centre and were used for various purposes until they were converted to offices for East Ayrshire Council ahead of the new council's creation in 1996.

== Wards ==
Map of 2017 election results

Since 2017 the area has divided into nine multi-member wards returning 32 members:

Ward Number	Ward Name	Location	Seats
1	Annick		4
2	Kilmarnock North		3
3	Kilmarnock West and Crosshouse		4
4	Kilmarnock East and Hurlford		4
5	Kilmarnock South		3
6	Irvine Valley		3
7	Ballochmyle		4
8	Cumnock and New Cumnock		4
9	Doon Valley		3

== See also ==
- East Ayrshire; the local authority area
- Local government in Scotland
