= The Rubbish Party =

Political party

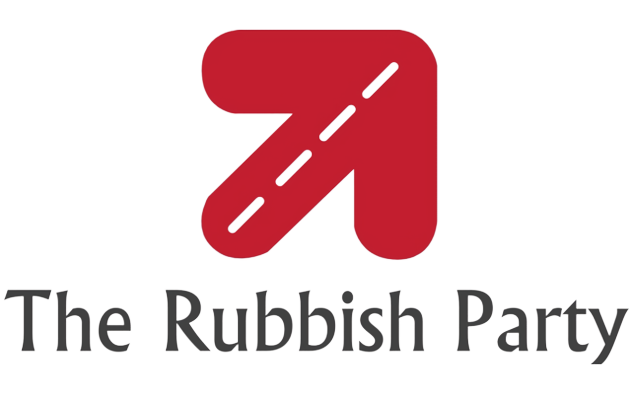
- Leader: Sally Cogley
- Founded: March 2017; 9 years ago
- Headquarters: Cessnock Castle; Galston; KA4 8LJ
- Colours: White Red
- East Ayrshire Council: 1 / 32

Website
- therubbishparty.co.uk

The Rubbish Party is a minor political party in Scotland that returned a candidate at the 2017 East Ayrshire Council election, in East Ayrshire, Scotland. The party was re-elected in the 2022 election.

The party was registered by Sally Cogley, of Galston, two months before the election, due to her concern over issues of waste and littering.

== History ==
Prior to forming The Rubbish Party, Cogley was known locally for her anti-litter activism, having organised a series of social media campaigns against fly-tipping and dog fouling in the Loudoun (Irvine) Valley area.

Cogley formed the party and launched her candidacy for office with a series of clean-up events in the local area and campaigned under such slogans as "Vote Sally for a better valley". Her campaign assured voters that she "aims to make the Irvine Valley a better place to work, live and visit."

In May 2017, Cogley was elected to represent the Irvine Valley ward on East Ayrshire Council.

In June 2021, The Rubbish Party formed part of the leadership team of East Ayrshire Council alongside the Labour and Co-operative Party when Colgey was appointed as Depute provost, following a vote by Opposition Councillors to replace the incumbent SNP chairpersons.

== Elected representatives ==
=== East Ayrshire Council ===
Councillor	Ward	First elected	Ref
Sally Cogley	Irvine Valley	2017	

== Electoral performance ==
=== East Ayrshire Council ===
Year	Candidates	Votes	Share of votes		Seats	
2017	1	784	1.88%	New	1 / 54	▲1
2022	1	787	1.85%	▼0.03%	1 / 54	Steady
