= Kilmarnock East and Hurlford (ward) =

Electoral ward of East Ayrshire, Scotland

- East Ayrshire
- Boundary of Kilmarnock East and Hurlford in East Ayrshire from 2007–2017.
- Population: 15,570 (2021)
- Electorate: 12,370 (2022)
- Major settlements: Hurlford; Kilmarnock (part of)
- Scottish Parliament constituency: Kilmarnock and Irvine Valley
- Scottish Parliament region: South Scotland
- UK Parliament constituency: Kilmarnock and Loudon

Current ward
- Created: 2007
- Number of councillors: 4
- Councillor: Barry Douglas (Labour)
- Councillor: Graham Barton (SNP)
- Councillor: Graham Boyd (Independent)
- Councillor: Neal Ingram (SNP)
- Created from: Crookedholm, Moscow, Galston West and Hurlford North; Hurlford; Kilmarnock Central East; Kilmarnock Central South; North New Farm Loch and Dean; South New Farm Loch

Kilmarnock East and Hurlford is one of the nine wards used to elect members of the East Ayrshire Council. It elects four councillors using the single transferable vote electoral system and covers an area with a population of 15,570 people.

The area has produced strong results for both Labour and the Scottish National Party (SNP) with the former holding two seats between 2007 and 2017 and the latter taking half the seats at every election.

== Boundaries ==
The ward was created following the Fourth Statutory Reviews of Electoral Arrangements ahead of the 2007 Scottish local elections. As a result of the Local Governance (Scotland) Act 2004, local elections in Scotland would use the single transferable vote electoral system from 2007 onwards so Kilmarnock East and Hurlford was formed from an amalgamation of several previous first-past-the-post wards.

It contained all of the former South New Farm Loch ward as well as parts of the former North New Farm Loch and Dean, Kilmarnock Central East, Kilmarnock Central South, Crookedholm, Moscow, Galston West and Hurlford North and Hurlford wards. Initially, Kilmarnock East and Hurlford included the easternmost part of Kilmarnock including the neighbourhoods of New Farm Loch, Beansburn and Townholm as well as the towns of Hurlford and Crookedholm. Following the Fifth Statutory Reviews of Electoral Arrangements ahead of the 2017 Scottish local elections, the ward's western boundary was moved east to run along the B7038 instead of the Kilmarnock Water and Craufurdland Water to take in Dean Castle Country Park.

== Councillors ==
Election	Councillors			
2007	John Campbell (SNP)	Jim Buchannan (SNP)	Drew McIntyre (Labour)	Gordon Cree (Labour)
2012	John Campbell (SNP)	Jim Buchannan (SNP)	Drew McIntyre (Labour)	Gordon Cree (Labour)
2017 by-election	John Campbell (SNP)	Fiona Campbell (SNP)	Drew McIntyre (Labour)	Gordon Cree (Labour)
2017	John Campbell (SNP)	Fiona Campbell (SNP)	Barry Douglas (Labour)	Jon Herd (Conservative)
2022	Graham Barton (SNP)	Neal Ingram (SNP)	Barry Douglas (Labour)	Graham Boyd (Ind.)

== Election results ==
=== 2022 election ===
Kilmarnock East and Hurlford – 4 seats
Party	Candidate	FPv%	Count				
Party	Candidate	FPv%	1	2	3	4	5
Labour	Barry Douglas (incumbent)	38.5	2,053				
SNP	Graham Barton	28.2	1,501				
Conservative	Jon Herd (incumbent)	12.1	645	796	798	854	
Independent	Graham Boyd	10.8	574	776	799	879	1,288
SNP	Neal Ingram	9.0	481	616	983	1,000	1,030
Liberal Democrats	Trevor Grant	1.4	74	209	218		
Electorate: 12,370 Valid: 5,328 Spoilt: 69 Quota: 1,066 Turnout: 43.6%

=== 2017 election ===
Kilmarnock East and Hurlford - 4 members
Party	Candidate	FPv%	Count						
Party	Candidate	FPv%	1	2	3	4	5	6	7
SNP	Fiona Campbell (incumbent)	28.8	1,459						
Conservative	Jon Herd	21.6	1,094						
Labour	Barry Douglas	16.9	856	867	906	923	933	1,007	1,513
SNP	John Campbell (incumbent)	16.3	827	1,232					
Labour	Dave Meechan	9.5	479	485	500	510	517	609	
Independent	Raymond Pattison	6.1	309	313	347	363	383		
Scottish Libertarian	Stephen McNamara	0.8	40	41	54	60			
Electorate: 12,244 Valid: 5,064 Spoilt: 129 Quota: 1,013 Turnout: 42.4%

=== 2017 by-election ===
Kilmarnock East and Hurlford by-election (26 January 2017) – 1 seat
Party	Candidate	FPv%	Count		
Party	Candidate	FPv%	1	2	3
SNP	Fiona Campbell	48.7	1,461	1,471	1,531
Labour	Dave Meechem	29.4	881	893	1,122
Conservative	Jon Herd	20.1	602	608	
Scottish Libertarian	Stephen McNamara	1.8	53		
Electorate: 11,266 Valid: 2,997 Spoilt: 33 Quota: 1,449 Turnout: 26.6%

=== 2012 election ===
Kilmarnock East and Hurlford – 4 members
Party	Candidate	FPv%	Count
Party	Candidate	FPv%	1
SNP	John Campbell (incumbent)	25.4	1,126
Labour	Gordon Cree (incumbent)	23.8	1,054
Labour	Drew McIntyre (incumbent)	22.2	984
SNP	James Buchanan (incumbent) (Note: Kilmarnock East and Hurlford councillor James Buchanan died on 28 October 2016 after a short illness. A by-election was held on 26 January 2017.)	21.3	944
Conservative	Rob Murray	7.4	326
Electorate: 11,311 Valid: 4,434 Spoilt: 142 Quota: 887 Turnout: 39.2%

=== 2007 election ===
Kilmarnock East and Hurlford - 4 seats
Party	Candidate	FPv%	Count					
Party	Candidate	FPv%	1	2	3	4	5	6
SNP	John Campbell	20.0	1,300					
SNP	Jim Buchanan	19.5	1,269	1,313				
Labour	Drew McIntyre	15.9	1,031	1,039	1,039	1,077	1,141	1,555
Labour	Gordon Cree	14.9	970	977	978	1,031	1,110	1,373
Labour	Jim Raymond	14.2	924	947	947	974	1,014	
Conservative	Ian Grant	7.7	502	505	506	574		
Independent	John Weir	5.4	350	378	380			
Solidarity	Gordon Walker	2.3	151					
Electorate: 11,568 Valid: 6,497 Spoilt: 148 Quota: 1,300 Turnout: 56.1%
