= Elena Whitham =

Scottish politician (born 1974)

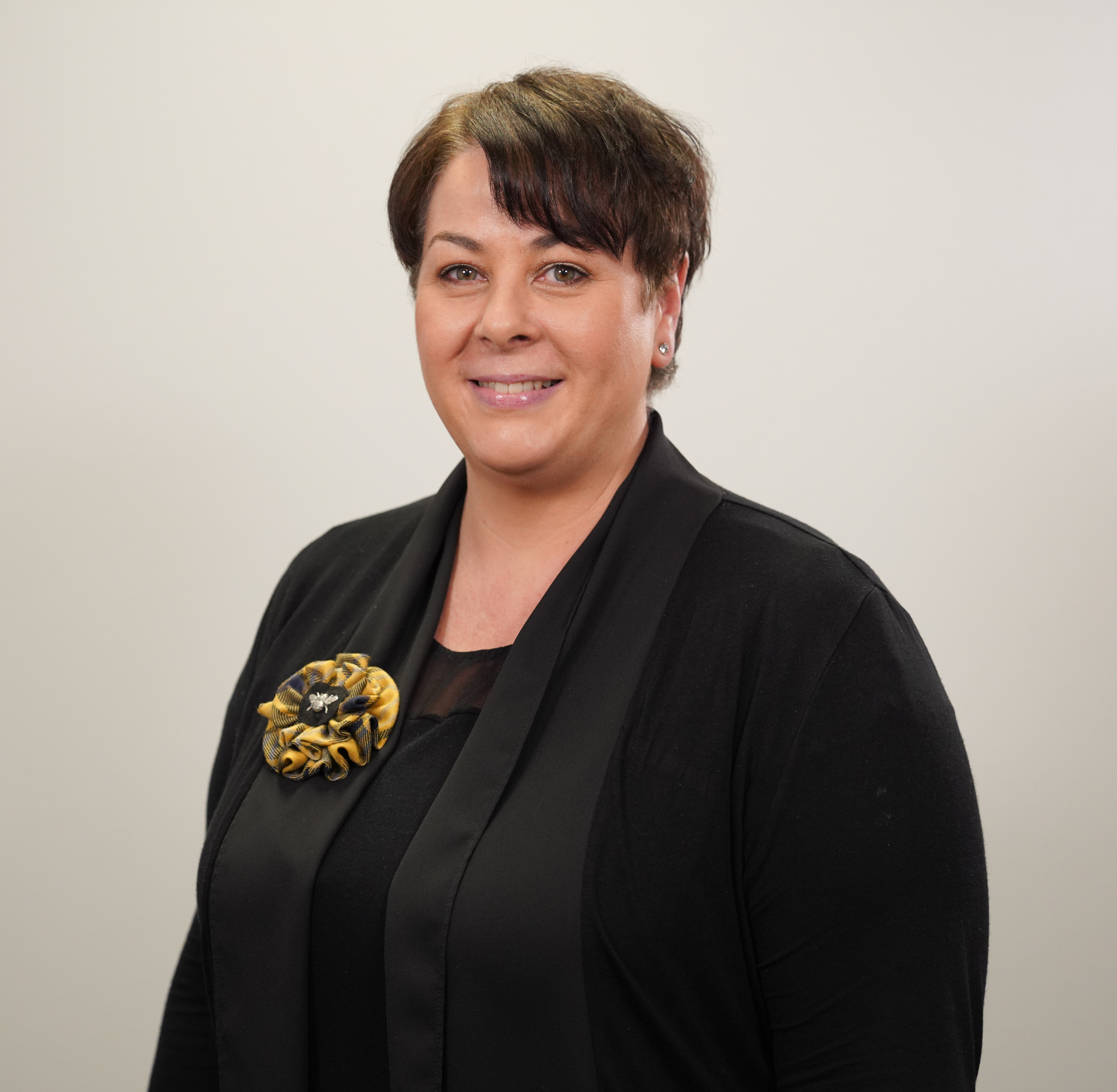
- Official portrait, 2023

Minister for Drugs and Alcohol Policy
- In office 29 March 2023 – 6 February 2024
- First Minister: Humza Yousaf
- Preceded by: Angela Constance
- Succeeded by: Christina McKelvie

Minister for Community Safety
- In office 3 November 2022 – 29 March 2023
- First Minister: Nicola Sturgeon
- Preceded by: Ash Regan
- Succeeded by: Siobhian Brown

Member of the Scottish Parliament for Carrick, Cumnock and Doon Valley
- In office 6 May 2021 – 9 April 2026
- Preceded by: Jeane Freeman
- Succeeded by: Katie Hagmann

Personal details
- Born: Elena McLeod; 9 July 1974 (age 52) Kilmarnock, Scotland
- Party: Scottish National Party
- Children: 2

Elena Whitham (née McLeod, born 9 July 1974) is a Scottish National Party (SNP) politician. A former Member of the Scottish Parliament (MSP), she was elected in 2021 to represent Carrick, Cumnock and Doon Valley. From March 2023 to February 2024, she held the junior post of Minister for Drugs and Alcohol Policy. Previously, she was Minister for Community Safety in November 2022 under First Minister Nicola Sturgeon, following the resignation of Ash Regan.

As a child her family immigrated to Quebec, Whitham returned to Scotland in the 1990s, working for Scottish Women's Aid before becoming a councillor for Irvine Valley in East Ayrshire Council, and then Depute Leader of the council.

== Early life ==
Born on 9 July 1974 in Kilmarnock, her family immigrated to Quebec, Canada when she was six because her father could not find work in Scotland. Whitham's family were miners in Muirkirk and agricultural workers at many local farms from Sorn to Coylton. 1990-1992, Whitham studied at the Champlain College Saint-Lambert in Saint Lambert, Quebec. In 1993 she studied at Concordia University for a Bachelor of Arts in Journalism and Communications. In the 1995 Quebec independence referendum, she campaigned in-favour of Quebec sovereignty. After graduating, she returned to Scotland and freelanced in local media, then worked in community support roles in Ayrshire including over ten years as a Scottish Women's Aid worker assisting victims of domestic abuse.

== Political career ==
=== Local government ===
On 1 October 2015 she was elected to East Ayrshire Council in a by-election for the Irvine Valley ward. She became Depute Leader of the council, and was also national housing and homelessness lead for the Convention of Scottish Local Authorities.

=== Member of the Scottish Parliament ===
In October 2020 she was confirmed as a candidate for Scottish Parliament. On 8 May 2021 she was elected as Member of the Scottish Parliament (MSP) for Carrick, Cumnock and Doon Valley. Her majority of 4,337 votes (12.2%) was lower than that achieved in 2016 by her predecessor Jeane Freeman.

=== Minister for Community Safety ===
In November 2022, it was announced that Whitham would succeed Ash Regan as Minister for Community Safety, subject to parliamentary approval.

=== Minister for Drugs and Alcohol Policy ===
On 29 March 2023, Humza Yousaf appointed Whitham as the retitled Minister for Drugs and Alcohol Policy reporting directly to the First Minister. She resigned the post on 6 February 2024 due to her suffering from Post Traumatic Stress Disorder.

On 25 November 2024, Whitham announced she would not seek re-election at the 2026 Scottish Parliament election.

== Personal life ==
Whitham is the mother of two children.

Scottish Parliament
Preceded by Jeane Freeman	Member of the Scottish Parliament for Carrick, Cumnock and Doon Valley; 2021–present	Incumbent
