= 2007 East Ayrshire Council election =

East Ayrshire Council election

- 3 May 2007

All 32 seats to East Ayrshire Council 17 seats needed for a majority
- Registered: 91,963
- Turnout: 55.0%
	First party	Second party	Third party
	Lab	SNP	Con
Party	Labour	SNP	Conservative
Last election	23 seats, 49.2%	8 seats, 35.3%	1 seat, 12.5%
Seats won	14	14	3
Seat change	▼9	▲6	▲2
Popular vote	20,705	18,744	6,446
Percentage	41.1%	39.2%	12.8%
Swing	▼8.1%	▲3.9%	▲0.3%
Council Leader before election
Labour
Council Leader after election
SNP

Elections to East Ayrshire Council were held on 3 May 2007, the same day as the other Scottish local government elections and the Scottish Parliament general election. The election was the first one using nine new wards created as a result of the Local Governance (Scotland) Act 2004, each ward will elect three or four councillors using the single transferable vote system form of proportional representation. The new wards replace 32 single-member wards which used the plurality (first past the post) system of election.

== Election results ==
2007 East Ayrshire Council election result
Party	Seats	Gains	Losses	Net gain/loss	Seats %	Votes %	Votes	+/−
Labour	14			▼9	43.75	41.1	20,705	▼8.1
SNP	14			▲6	43.75	39.2	19,744	▲3.9
Conservative	3			▲2	9.38	12.8	6,446	▲0.3
Independent	1			▲1	3.13	5.2	2,614	▲3.5
Solidarity	0			Steady	0.00	0.7	351	New
Green	0			Steady	0.00	0.5	245	New
Scottish Socialist	0			Steady	0.00	0.3	162	▼0.9
BNP	0			Steady	0.0	0.2	86	Steady
Total	32						50,353	

Note: Votes are the sum of first preference votes across all council wards. The net gain/loss and percentage changes relate to the result of the previous Scottish local elections on 1 May 2003. This is because STV has an element of proportionality which is not present unless multiple seats are being elected. This may differ from other published sources showing gain/loss relative to seats held at the dissolution of Scotland's councils. This was the first election to use the STV electoral system so only net gains/losses are shown.

=== Ward summary ===
Results of the 2007 East Ayrshire Council election by ward
Ward	%	Cllrs	%	Cllrs	%	Cllrs	%	Cllrs	%	Cllrs	Total Cllrs
Ward	SNP		Labour		Conservative		Others		Independents		Total Cllrs
Annick	30.7	1	34.3	1	21.1	1	1.6	0	12.3	0	3
Kilmarnock North	55.7	2	26.7	1	15.8	0	1.9	0			3
Kilmarnock West and Crosshouse	47.2	2	32.5	1	17.0	1			3.3	0	4
Kilmarnock East and Hurlford	39.5	2	45.0	2	7.7	0	2.3	0	5.4	0	4
Kilmarnock South	44.7	2	47.7	1	5.9	0	1.7	0			3
Irvine Valley	43.5	2	31.6	1	20.5	1			4.3	0	4
Ballochmyle	29.1	1	51.7	3	9.2	0	4.2	0	5.8	0	4
Cumnock and New Cumnock	26.2	1	60.4	3	9.8	0	3.8	0			4
Doon Valley	26.0	1	49.0	1	8.4	0			16.6	1	3
Total	39.2	14	41.1	14	12.8	3	1.7	0	5.2	1	32

== Ward results ==
=== Annick ===
Annick - 3 members
Party	Candidate	FPv%	Count					
Party	Candidate	FPv%	1	2	3	4	5	6
SNP	John MacKay	30.7	1,625					
Conservative	Rose-Ann Cunninghame	21.1	1,117	1,163	1,194	1,401		
Labour	John McGhee	17.2	909	945	958	1,087	1,102	1,840
Labour	Jim O'Neil	17.1	905	928	938	1,077	1,085	
Independent	Ann Hay	12.3	651	726	746			
BNP	Thomas Sweeten	1.6	86	99				
Electorate: 9,068 Valid: 5,293 Spoilt: 89 Quota: 1,324 Turnout: 58.3%

=== Kilmarnock North ===
Kilmarnock North - 3 members
Party	Candidate	FPv%	Count	
Party	Candidate	FPv%	1	2
SNP	Willie Coffey	34.5	1,552	
Labour	Maureen McKay	26.7	1,202	
SNP	Helen Coffey	21.2	952	1,317
Conservative	James Adams	15.8	709	720
Scottish Socialist	Colin Rutherford	1.9	85	89
Electorate: 8,617 Valid: 4,500 Spoilt: 88 Quota: 1,126 Turnout: 52.2%

=== Kilmarnock West and Crosshouse ===
Kilmarnock West and Crosshouse - 4 members
Party	Candidate	FPv%	Count					
Party	Candidate	FPv%	1	2	3	4	5	6
SNP	Iain Linton	25.1	1,656					
SNP	Douglas Reid	22.1	1,454					
Labour	Robert Keohone	19.4	1,280	1,315	1,330			
Conservative	Tom Cook	17.0	1,118	1,118	1,209	1,209	1,308	1,578
Labour	Brian Reeves	13.1	866	901	917	925	978	
Independent	Shirley-Anne Weir	3.3	220	263	280	281		
Electorate: 11,833 Valid: 6,594 Spoilt: 182 Quota: 1,319 Turnout: 55.7%

=== Kilmarnock East and Hurlford ===
Kilmarnock East and Hurlford - 4 seats
Party	Candidate	FPv%	Count					
Party	Candidate	FPv%	1	2	3	4	5	6
SNP	John Campbell	20.0	1,300					
SNP	Jim Buchanan	19.5	1,269	1,313				
Labour	Drew McIntyre	15.9	1,031	1,039	1,039	1,077	1,141	1,555
Labour	Gordon Cree	14.9	970	977	978	1,031	1,110	1,373
Labour	Jim Raymond	14.2	924	947	947	974	1,014	
Conservative	Ian Grant	7.7	502	505	506	574		
Independent	John Weir	5.4	350	378	380			
Solidarity	Gordon Walker	2.3	151					
Electorate: 11,568 Valid: 6,497 Spoilt: 148 Quota: 1,300 Turnout: 56.1%

=== Kilmarnock South ===
Kilmarnock South - 3 members
Party	Candidate	FPv%	Count					
Party	Candidate	FPv%	1	2	3	4	5	6
Labour	John Knapp	38.7	1,708					
SNP	Hugh Ross	25.0	1,104	1,144				
SNP	Jim Todd	19.7	870	894	926	954	1,018	1,272
Labour	Ray Murray	9.0	398	800	801	825	901	
Conservative	Tamzin Hobday	5.9	262	276	277	289		
Scottish Socialist	Kevin McGregor	1.7	77	91	91			
Electorate: 8,328 Valid: 4,419 Spoilt: 131 Quota: 1,105 Turnout: 53.1%

=== Irvine Valley ===
Irvine Valley - 4 seats
Party	Candidate	FPv%	Count	
Party	Candidate	FPv%	1	2
SNP	Alan Brown	23.7	1,497	
Labour	Stuart Finlayson	22.4	1,416	
Conservative	Stephanie Young	20.5	1,293	
SNP	Bobby McDill	19.8	1,251	1,421
Labour	Isabella MacRae	9.2	580	592
Independent	May Anderson	4.3	274	286
Electorate: 11,324 Valid: 6,311 Spoilt: 135 Quota: 1,263 Turnout: 55.7%

=== Ballochmyle ===
Ballochmyle - 4 seats
Party	Candidate	FPv%	Count						
Party	Candidate	FPv%	1	2	3	4	5	6	7
Labour	Eric Jackson	20.5	1,195						
SNP	Jim Roberts	17.7	1,032	1,033	1,083	1,169			
Labour	Neil McGhee	16.0	931	937	958	990	991	1,026	1,130
Labour	Jimmy Kelly	15.2	883	895	924	976	976	1,044	1,146
SNP	David Shankland	11.4	667	668	682	712	715	805	
Conservative	Nick Martin	9.2	534	535	563	610	610		
Independent	Gordon Ralton	5.8	340	340	379				
Green	Brian Brodaley	4.2	245	246					
Electorate: 11,192 Valid: 5,827 Spoilt: 182 Quota: 1,166 Turnout: 52.1%

=== Cumnock and New Cumnock ===
Cumnock and New Cumnock - 4 seats
Party	Candidate	FPv%	Count						
Party	Candidate	FPv%	1	2	3	4	5	6	7
Labour	Eric Ross	24.4	1,297						
Labour	Billy Crawford	18.1	961	1,059	1,088				
Labour	Barney Menzies	17.9	950	1,026	1,049	1,066			
SNP	Kathy Morrice	13.8	733	744	809	810	810	898	1,504
SNP	Andrew Kent	12.4	661	664	696	698	698	815	
Conservative	James Boswell	9.8	519	524	536	536	536		
Solidarity	Jim Monaghan	3.8	200	205					
Electorate: 11,057 Valid: 5,321 Spoilt: 154 Quota: 1,065 Turnout: 48.1%

=== Doon Valley ===
Doon Valley - 3 seats
Party	Candidate	FPv%	Count				
Party	Candidate	FPv%	1	2	3	4	5
SNP	Drew Filson	26.0	1,221				
Labour	Elaine Stewart	17.4	814	819	838	1,022	
Independent	Jim Sutherland	16.6	779	790	915	1,036	1,089
Labour	Elaine Dinwoodie	16.5	776	780	826	1,097	1,802
Labour	Tommy Farrell	15.1	709	712	734		
Conservative	Margaret Sword	8.4	392	396			
Electorate: 8,976 Valid: 4,691 Spoilt: 96 Quota: 1,173 Turnout: 52.2%

== By-elections 2007–12 ==
=== Ballochmyle ===
On 11 December 2008 Labour's David Shaw won a by-election which arose following the resignation of his party colleague Eric Jackson on 24 September 2008.

Ballochmyle by-election (11 December 2008) – 1 seat
Party	Candidate	FPv%	Count		
Party	Candidate	FPv%	1	2	3
Labour	David Shaw	47.9	1,598	1,617	1,675
SNP	Roseanne Savage	33.8	1,129	1,160	1,261
Conservative	Janette MacAlpine	8.2	273	290	308
Solidarity	Danny Masterton	7.3	243	248	
Liberal Democrats	Ian Fraser	2.8	93		
Electorate: 11,527 Valid: 3,336 Spoilt: 29 Quota: 1,669 Turnout: 29.2%

=== Doon Valley ===
On 1 October 2009 a by-election was held to fill the vacancy which arose following the death of Independent Cllr James Sutherland. Moira Pirrie won the by-election for Labour

Doon Valley by-election, 1 October 2009 – 1 seat
Party	Candidate	FPv%	Count
Party	Candidate	FPv%	1
Labour	Moira Pirrie	50.54	1,221
SNP	John Bell	36.88	891
Conservative	Nicholas Martin	7.28	176
Independent	Yvonne Hamilton	3.48	84
Independent	Robert Shennan	1.82	44
Electorate: 9,144 Valid: 2,416 Spoilt: 33 Quota: 1,209 Turnout: 26.8%
