= Catrine, Sorn and North Auchinleck (ward) =

Scottish electoral ward

- East Ayrshire
- Electorate: 3,281 (1995)
- Major settlements: Auchinleck; Catrine; Sorn
- UK Parliament constituency: Carrick, Cumnock and Doon Valley

1984–1999
- Number of councillors: 1
- Replaced by: Auchinleck; Catrine, Sorn and Mauchline East
- Created from: Auchinleck; Catrine and Sorn

Catrine, Sorn and North Auchinleck was one of 30 electoral wards of East Ayrshire Council. Originally created in 1984, the ward was initially within Cumnock and Doon Valley District Council before the local government reforms in the 1990s. The ward elected one councillor using the first-past-the-post voting electoral system.

The ward was a Labour stronghold as the party successfully held the seat at every election.

In 1999, the ward was abolished with the area represented by the ward placed into the new Catrine, Sorn and Mauchline East ward and the re-established Auchinleck ward.

== Boundaries ==
The Catrine, Sorn and North Auchinleck ward was created for the 1984 local elections by the Initial Statutory Reviews of Electoral Arrangements in 1981 from part of the former Catrine and Sorn and Auchinleck wards. The ward took in the villages of Catrine and Sorn as well as the northern part of Auchinleck. The ward took in the northeastern part of Cumnock and Doon Valley between its borders with Kilmarnock and Loudoun District Council and Clydesdale District Council. The ward's boundaries were unchanged following the Second Statutory Reviews of Electoral Arrangements in 1994. After the implementation of the Local Government etc. (Scotland) Act 1994, the boundaries proposed by the second review became the Formation Electoral Arrangements for the newly created East Ayrshire Council – an amalgamation of Cumnock and Doon Valley District Council and Kilmarnock and Loudoun District Council. In 1999, the ward was abolished following the Third Statutory Reviews of Electoral Arrangements with the area split between the re-established Auchinleck ward and the new Catrine, Sorn and Mauchline East ward.

== Councillors ==
Election	Councillor
1984	R. Stevenson
1988	A. McIntyre
1992	G. Smith

== Election results ==
=== 1995 election ===
Catrine, Sorn and North Auchinleck
Party	Candidate	Votes	%	±%
Labour	G. Smith	1,058	71.7	▲31.2
SNP	R. Clark	329	22.3	▲9.1
Conservative	M. McWhirter	89	6.0	▼2.8
Majority		729	49.4	▲46.3
Turnout		1,476	46.4	▼4.6
Registered electors		3,178		
Labour hold		Swing	▲11.0	

=== 1992 election ===
Catrine, Sorn and North Auchinleck
Party	Candidate	Votes	%	±%
Labour	G. Smith	666	40.5	▼27.4
Independent	A. McIntyre	615	37.4	New
SNP	M. Hendrie	217	13.2	▼18.7
Conservative	G. Telford	145	8.8	New
Majority		51	3.1	▼32.9
Turnout		1,643	51.0	▲4.4
Registered electors		3,223		
Labour hold		Swing	▼32.4	

=== 1988 election ===
Catrine, Sorn and North Auchinleck
Party	Candidate	Votes	%	±%
Labour	A. McIntyre	948	67.9	▼4.8
SNP	J. Kellighan	445	31.9	New
Majority		503	36.0	▼9.7
Turnout		1,393	40.5	▲10.9
Registered electors		3,451		
Labour hold		Swing	▼18.3	

=== 1984 election ===
Catrine, Sorn and North Auchinleck
Party	Candidate	Votes	%
Labour	R. Stevenson	1,294	72.7
Conservative	J. McAuslan	481	27.0
Majority		813	45.7
Turnout		1,775	51.4
Registered electors		3,463	
Labour win (new seat)			
