= Catrine, Sorn and Mauchline East (ward) =

Scottish electoral ward

- East Ayrshire
- Electorate: 2,898 (2003)
- Major settlements: Mauchline
- Scottish Parliament constituency: Carrick, Cumnock and Doon Valley
- Scottish Parliament region: South Scotland
- UK Parliament constituency: Kilmarnock and Loudon

1999–2007
- Number of councillors: 1
- Replaced by: Ballochmyle; Cumnock and New Cumnock
- Created from: Catrine, Sorn and North Auchinleck; Mauchline

Catrine, Sorn and Mauchline East was one of 32 electoral wards of East Ayrshire Council. The ward was created in 1999 and elected one councillor using the first-past-the-post voting electoral system.

The ward was a Labour stronghold as the party successfully held the seat at every election. George Smith was the only councillor elected as he represented the ward from 1999 to 2007.

In 2007, the ward was abolished and replaced by the multi-member Ballochmyle ward as council elections moved to a proportional voting system – the single transferable vote – following the implementation of the Local Governance (Scotland) Act 2004.

== Boundaries ==
The Catrine, Sorn and Mauchline East ward was created in 1999 by the Third Statutory Reviews of Electoral Arrangements which combined part of the former Catrine, Sorn and North Auchinleck ward with part of the Mauchline ward. The ward centered on the villages of Catrine and Sorn as well as the eastern part of Mauchline and took in an area in the east of East Ayrshire next to its border with South Lanarkshire. In 2007, the ward was abolished as the Local Governance (Scotland) Act 2004 saw proportional representation and new multi-member wards introduced. The vast majority of the area covered by the Catrine, Sorn and Mauchline East ward was placed into the new Ballochmyle ward and a small area south of the A76 was placed in the Cumnock and New Cumnock ward.

== Councillors ==
Election	Councillor
1999	G. Smith

== Election results ==
=== 2003 election ===
Catrine, Sorn and Mauchline East
Party	Candidate	Votes	%	±%
Labour Co-op	George Smith	779	51.4	▲3.3
SNP	Jacqueline Todd	500	33.0	▼6.5
Conservative	Kenneth Stirling	238	15.7	▲3.4
Majority		279	18.4	▲9.8
Turnout		1,517	52.3	▼9.5
Registered electors		2,898		
Labour Co-op hold		Swing	▲4.9	

=== 1999 election ===
Catrine, Sorn and Mauchline East
Party	Candidate	Votes	%
Labour Co-op	G. Smith	858	48.1
SNP	D. Shankland	704	39.5
Conservative	N. Martin	222	12.4
Majority		154	8.6
Turnout		1,784	61.8
Registered electors		2,942	
Labour Co-op win (new seat)			
