= Catrine and Sorn (ward) =

Scottish electoral ward

- Cumnock and Doon Valley
- Electorate: 2,311 (1980)
- Major settlements: Catrine; Sorn
- UK Parliament constituency: Carrick, Cumnock and Doon Valley

1974–1984
- Number of councillors: 1
- Replaced by: Catrine, Sorn and North Auchinleck

Catrine and Sorn was one of 10 electoral wards of Cumnock and Doon Valley District Council. Created in 1974, the ward elected one councillor using the first-past-the-post voting electoral system.

The ward produced strong results for Labour with the party holding the seat at two of the three elections. It was also the last seat in Cumnock and Doon Valley to elect a Conservative councillor when the party won the seat in 1977.

In 1984, the ward was abolished and the area covered by it was placed in the new Catrine, Sorn and North Auchinleck ward.

== Boundaries ==
The Catrine and Sorn ward was created in 1974 by the Formation Electoral Arrangements from the previous Sorn electoral division of Ayr County Council. The ward centered around the villages of Catrine and Sorn and took in the northeastern part of Cumnock and Doon Valley between its borders with Kilmarnock and Loudoun District Council and Clydesdale District Council. Following the Initial Statutory Reviews of Electoral Arrangements in 1981 the ward was abolished and replaced by Catrine, Sorn and North Auchinleck which was an amalgamation of the Catrine and Sorn ward and part of the Auchinleck ward.

== Councillors ==
Election	Councillor
1974	H. Nisbet
1977	J. KMcInnes
1980	R. Stevenson

== Election results ==
=== 1980 election ===
Catrine and Sorn
Party	Candidate	Votes	%	±%
Labour	R. Stevenson	820	55.4	▲30.5
Conservative	J. McInnes	659	44.5	▲7.6
Majority		161	10.9	N/A
Turnout		1,479	64.0	▲5.5
Registered electors		2,311		
Labour gain from Conservative		Swing	▲11.4	

=== 1977 election ===
Catrine and Sorn
Party	Candidate	Votes	%
Conservative	J. McInnes	496	36.9
Independent Labour	H. Nisbet	373	27.8
Labour	G. Smith	334	24.9
SLP	E. Standring	140	10.4
Majority		123	9.1
Turnout		1,343	58.5
Registered electors		2,305	
Conservative gain from Labour			

=== 1974 election ===
Catrine and Sorn
Party	Candidate	Votes	%
Labour	H. Nisbet	Unopposed	
Registered electors		2,307	
Labour win (new seat)			
