= Lady's Well, Auchmannoch =

Coordinates: 55.5499°N 4.3068°W

Lady's Well
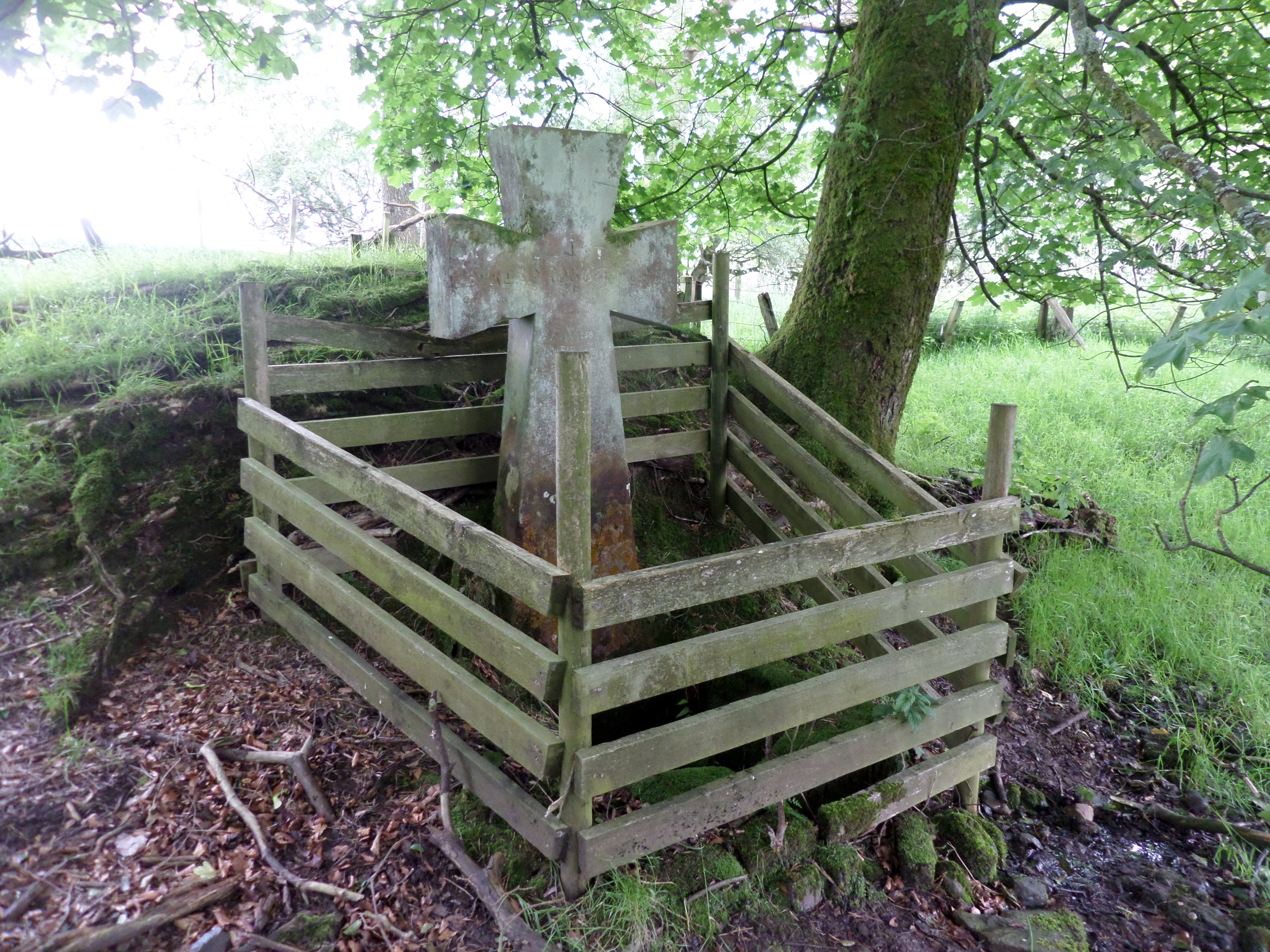
- The Lady's Well and Cross at the Stra Burn Ford, Auchmannoch

- Location within East Ayrshire
- Council area: East Ayrshire
- Country: Scotland
- Sovereign state: United Kingdom
- Post town: Kilmarnock
- Police: Scotland
- Fire: Scottish
- Ambulance: Scottish

The Lady's Well is a natural spring surmounted by a large cross that stands beside the Stra Burn Ford (NS254630) near Auchmannoch House in the Parish of Sorn, East Ayrshire, Scotland. It is associated with the Virgin Mary as a curative well, a Wishing Well and also a Clootie well, additionally Mary Queen of Scots is said to have once watered her horse here. A large red sandstone cross was erected here at an unrecorded date. The well is also said to have acquired its name through "..one of the ladies of Auchmannoch family drinking water exclusively from here."

== History ==
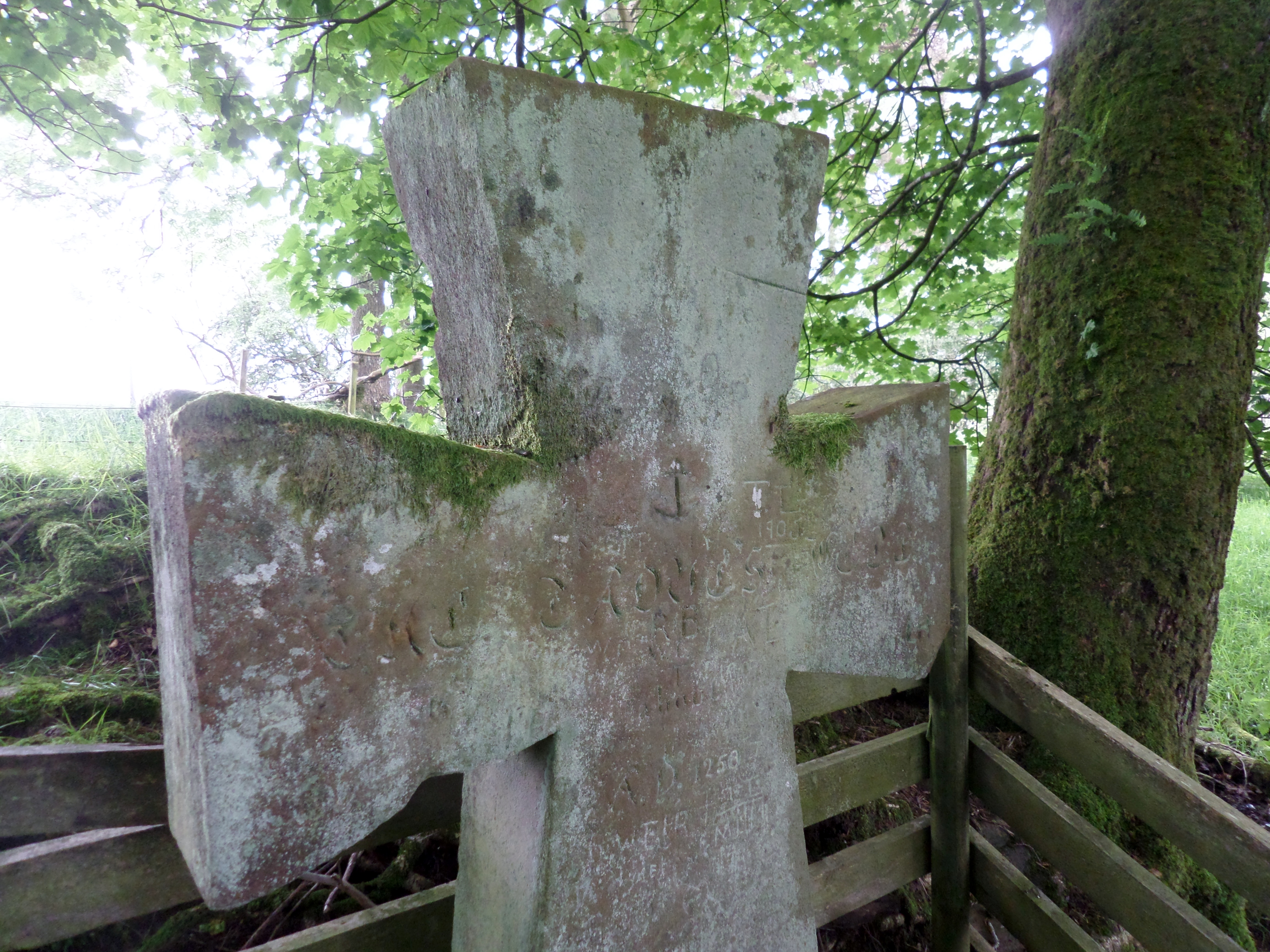
The inscription on the cross is 'The Lady's Well and the date AD 1258 is carved below it.

In the 12th century a grant of lands including Auchmannoch was made to the monks of Melrose Abbey by Alan, the High Steward. Early in the 15th century a family of Campbells descended from the Campbells of Loudoun Castle held the lands from the church, a 1565 charter from the Commendator of Melrose shows that Campbell and Margaret Campbell renewed their possession of the 'Lands of Auchmannoch' in 1565 and held them from that point onward until 1919.

Auchmannoch stands on one of the oldest roads in the district, running once from Loudoun Castle via Cessnock Castle to Sorn Castle through Threepwood and Auchencloigh with the Stra Burn Ford and the Lady's Well on the route.

The Ordnance Survey may contradict the fine detail of the story that Mary Queen of Scots watered her horses here once by stating that the 'Queen's Syke "..is a Small Stream or marsh forming a Junction with the Stra Burn about 13 chains N [North] east of Coplar. It is handed down by tradition which the Authorities here verify that Mary Queen of Scots with some of her attendants halted at this place on her passage of flight to England." It is known that the queen stayed in the area after fleeing from the Battle of Langside.

== The Well and Cross ==
The substantial red sandstone cross is of an unknown date, almost certainly erected by the Campbells of Auchmannoch in the 19th century. It carries the inscription 'The Lady's Well' in flowing Old English script and also the date 'About AD 1258' representing when the lands were first granted to the Abbey of Melrose or possibly the date of the discovery of the well. Postcards carry the inscription 'Wishing Well' and a pipe can be seen carrying the overflow flow from the well into the Stra Burn. A substantial stone trough has been set into the ground with the cross at the top and a narrow secondary overflow appears to be present in addition to the aforementioned pipe that leads to the Stra Burn. A substantial amount of graffiti has been added to the cross over the years.

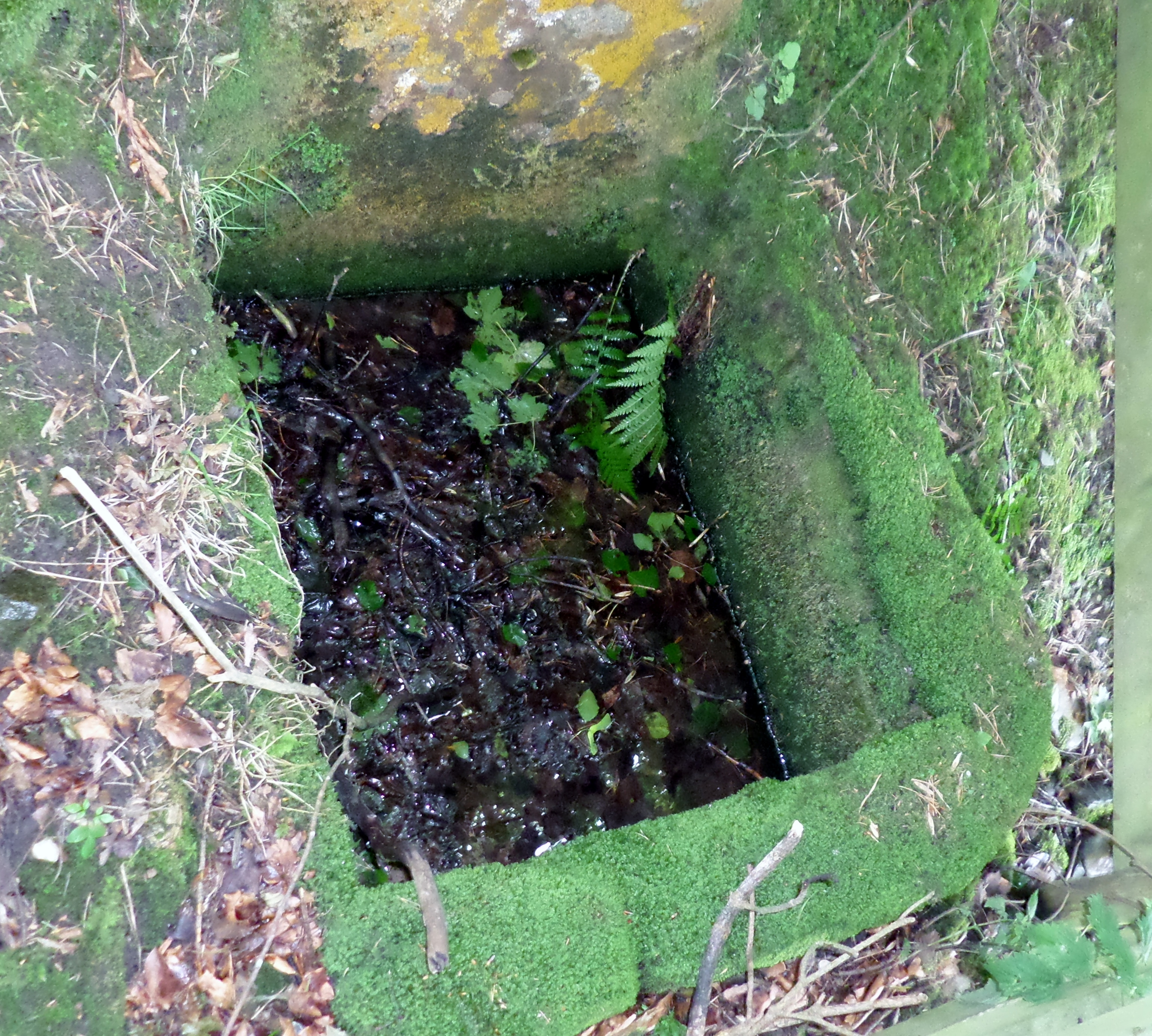
The stone trough and overflow.

The construction of a new road nearby to Crofthead Farm, avoiding the passage through the Stra Burn Ford, cut off the water supply to this natural spring. An old Sycamore grows next to the well and its cross.

The Lady's Well is said to have been a Clootie well, the practise dying out after WWII. These 'Clootie wells' were places of pilgrimage in Celtic areas, almost always with a tree growing beside them where strips of cloth or rags were left, usually tied to the branches of the tree as part of a healing ritual. It is not recorded what ailments the holy water from the well was thought to heal. In Scots nomenclature, a "clootie" or "cloot" is a strip of cloth or rag. Other offerings were also sometimes made at such sites, including coins, pins, white pebbles, etc as is still the case at Saint Queran's Holy Well, Islesteps, near Dumfries.

=== Etymology ===
It is thought that the name 'Auchmannoch' may translate from the Scots Gaelic 'Achadch Mannoch' as the 'Field of the Monks' linking with the 12th century grant of these lands to the monks of Melrose Abbey by Alan, the High Steward. Millmannoch near Colylton may contain the same name element.

== See also ==
- Millmannoch
