= 1984 Cumnock and Doon Valley District Council election =

Cumnock and Doon Valley District Council election

- 3 May 1984

All 10 seats to Cumnock and Doon Valley District Council 6 seats needed for a majority
- Registered: 33,911
- Turnout: 50.2% (Note: Excludes uncontested wards.)
	First party
	Lab
Party	Labour
Last election	8 seats, 48.2%
Seats won	10
Seat change	▲2
Popular vote	7,253
Percentage	70.2%
Swing	▲22.0
Council Leader before election
Labour
Council Leader after election
Labour

Elections to Cumnock and Doon Valley District Council were held on 3 May 1984, on the same day as the other Scottish local government elections. This was the fourth election to the district council following the local government reforms in the 1970s.

The election was the first to use the 10 wards created by the Initial Statutory Reviews of Electoral Arrangements in 1981. Each ward elected one councillor using first-past-the-post voting.

Labour maintained control of the district council after winning all 10 seats although four wards were uncontested after only Labour stood a candidate. Despite the uncontested seats, Labour increased their vote share by more than 20% and took nearly three-quarters of the popular vote.

== Results ==
1984 Cumnock and Doon Valley District Council election result
Party	Seats	Gains	Losses	Net gain/loss	Seats %	Votes %	Votes	+/−
Labour	10	2	0	▲2	100.0	70.2	7,253	▲22.0
Independent Labour	0	0	0	Steady	0.0	24.9	1,381	New
SDP	0	0	0	Steady	0.0	18.4	959	New
Conservative	0	0	0	Steady	0.0	17.6	706	▲9.3
Total	10						10,299	

== Ward results ==
=== Cumnock East ===
Cumnock East
Party	Candidate	Votes	%
Labour	Eric Ross	Unopposed	
Registered electors		2,717	
Labour win (new seat)			

=== Lugar, Logan and Muirkirk ===
Lugar, Logan and Muirkirk
Party	Candidate	Votes	%
Labour	J. Cannon	1,248	68.3
Independent Labour	W. Murray	287	15.7
Independent Labour	T. Hendry	237	13.0
Independent Labour	J. McGrady	53	2.9
Majority		961	42.6
Turnout		1,825	55.3
Registered electors		3,292	
Labour hold			

=== Cumnock South and Old Cumnock ===
Cumnock South and Old Cumnock
Party	Candidate	Votes	%
Labour	David Sneller	Unopposed	
Registered electors		3,540	
Labour win (new seat)			

=== Cumnock West and Auchinleck ===
Cumnock West and Auchinleck
Party	Candidate	Votes	%
Labour	Jean Allan	1,325	91.2
SDP	J. McHardy	287	8.3
Majority		1,204	82.9
Turnout		1,612	39.1
Registered electors		3,717	
Labour win (new seat)			

=== Catrine, Sorn and North Auchinleck ===
Catrine, Sorn and North Auchinleck
Party	Candidate	Votes	%
Labour	R. Stevenson	1,294	72.7
Conservative	J. McAuslan	481	27.0
Majority		813	45.7
Turnout		1,775	51.4
Registered electors		3,463	
Labour win (new seat)			

=== New Cumnock ===
New Cumnock
Party	Candidate	Votes	%
Labour	J. Paterson	Unopposed	
Registered electors		3,829	
Labour hold			

=== Dalmellington ===
Dalmellington
Party	Candidate	Votes	%	±%
Labour	T. Gormanley	790	51.4	▲16.8
SDP	W. Steele	744	48.4	New
Majority		46	3.0	N/A
Turnout		1,534	48.8	▲2.4
Registered electors		3,151		
Labour gain from Independent		Swing	▲40.8	

=== Patna and Dalrymple ===
Patna and Dalrymple
Party	Candidate	Votes	%	±%
Labour	T. Hainey	876	58.6	▲21.0
Independent Labour	J. Freeburn	616	41.2	New
Majority		260	17.4	N/A
Turnout		1,492	47.9	▼5.6
Registered electors		3,122		
Labour gain from Independent		Swing	▲41.6	

=== Drongan, Ochiltree, Rankinston and Stair ===
Drongan, Ochiltree, Rankinston and Stair
Party	Candidate	Votes	%
Labour	J. Hodge	1,720	77.0
Conservative	M. Castle	225	10.1
Independent Labour	J. Graham	188	8.4
SDP	J. McMaster	94	4.2
Majority		1,495	66.9
Turnout		2,227	55.3
Registered electors		3,831	
Labour hold			

=== Mauchline ===
Mauchline
Party	Candidate	Votes	%
Labour	D. Shankland	Unopposed	
Registered electors		3,249	
Labour hold			
