= James Cooper (minister) =

James Cooper (1846–1922) was a Church of Scotland minister and church historian. In 1917 he attained the highest position in the Church of Scotland as Moderator of the General Assembly. He was a prolific author on religious topics and strong advocate of the reunion of the various schisms of the Scottish church.

== Life ==
He was born in Elgin on 13 February 1846, the son of John Alexander Cooper (d.1881), a local merchant and former farmer, and his wife, Ann Stephen of Old Keith (d. 1909). He studied at Elgin Academy and Aberdeen University, graduating M.A. in 1867. He also spent at least one semester at the University of Heidelberg before being licensed to preach as a Church of Scotland minister by the Presbytery of Elgin.

After serving some time as assistant in various parishes, Banchory-Ternan, Stirling and Elgin, he was ordained as minister of St Stephen's Church in Broughty Ferry near Dundee in April 1873. In May 1881 he translated to East Church, Aberdeen. During his time in Aberdeen he founded the Aberdeen Ecclesiastical Society and jointly founded the Scottish Church Society. In 1892 Aberdeen University awarded him a Doctor of Divinity.

In September 1898 he was presented under patronage of Queen Victoria to Glasgow University as Professor of Ecclesiastical History, beginning teaching in 1899.

In 1909 the University of Dublin awarded him a Doctor of Literature. Durham University made him a Doctor of Canon Law in 1910. He was Croall Lecturer for 1916.

In 1917 Cooper was elected Moderator of the General Assembly of the Church of Scotland in place of John Brown.

After the First World War, the Serbian government awarded him the Order of St Sava in 1919. In the same year he was the Olaus Petri Lecturer in Uppsala in Sweden. Widely respected, further doctorates continued: Doctor of Divinity from Oxford University in 1920; Doctor of Laws (LLD) from Glasgow University in 1922.

He resigned his chair in ill-health in September 1922 and died in Elgin on 27 December 1922. He is buried with his parents and grandfather in Urquhart Old Parish Churchyard. The unusual grave takes the form of a mercat cross.

== Family ==
In January 1912 he married Margaret Williamson (d.1947), daughter of farmer George Williamson of Shempston. No children are recorded.

== Publications ==
- Scotland's Gains from the Revolution of 1688 (1888)
- Chartulary of the Church of St Nicholas, Aberdeen 2 vols. (1888 + 1892)
- Bethlehem, a Series of Advent Sermons (1889)
- Easter Communions (1889)
- John Henry Newman (1890)
- Scottish Presbyterian Reunion (1891)
- Testamentum Domini (1902) translated from Syriac with Bishop Maclean
- The Scottish Liturgy of 1637 (1904)
- A Royal Abbey (Dunfermline) (1905)
- Australian Reunion (1908)
- Sonnets on Scottish Cathedrals and Universities (1911)
- Kindness to the Dead (1913)
- Historical Side of the Reunion Question (1914)
- Soldiers of the Bible (1915)
- Towards Christian Unity (1918)
