= John Campbell of Sorn =

John Campbell

Religious life
- Religion: Christianity
- School: Presbyterianism

John Campbell of Sorn in Ayrshire was a 17th-century nonconforming minister of the gospel.

He was charged in an Edinburgh court for attending a service of worship at the house of James Campbell (vintner) and Thomas Waddell during the hours of Sunday morning worship. He was imprisoned on the Bass Rock on the Firth of Forth in Haddingtonshire.

He was admitted to Sorn about 1658 but was subsequently deprived by Act of Parliament 11 June, and Decreet of Privy Council 1 October 1662. He was summoned to appear before a committee of the Diocesan Synod, on 28 April 1664, for nonconformity. He returned in 1672.

Campbell had an indulgence along with the preceding, from the Privy Council on 3 September 1672, but having preached at conventicles in 1678, was accused of treason before the Lords of Justiciary, and remitted by them to the Privy Council on 19 December 1683. Admitting he had broken his confinement, officiated in private families, and had not read the Proclamation for the thanksgiving, his indulgence was revoked on 3 January 1684, and he was imprisoned on failure to find caution in 5000 merks that he would not frequent conventicles, baptize, or marry. But on his petition that he could not possibly find such caution, he was liberated on undertaking not to transgress in these matters, 24 January 1684. He was at the first meeting of Presbytery after the Toleration, on 3 August 1687, and is styled minister of Dalgain 4 June 1690, but probably went to Craigie.
