= John Brown (moderator) =

Scottish minister

John Brown (1850-1919) was a Scottish minister who served as Moderator of the General Assembly of the Church of Scotland in 1916.

== Life ==
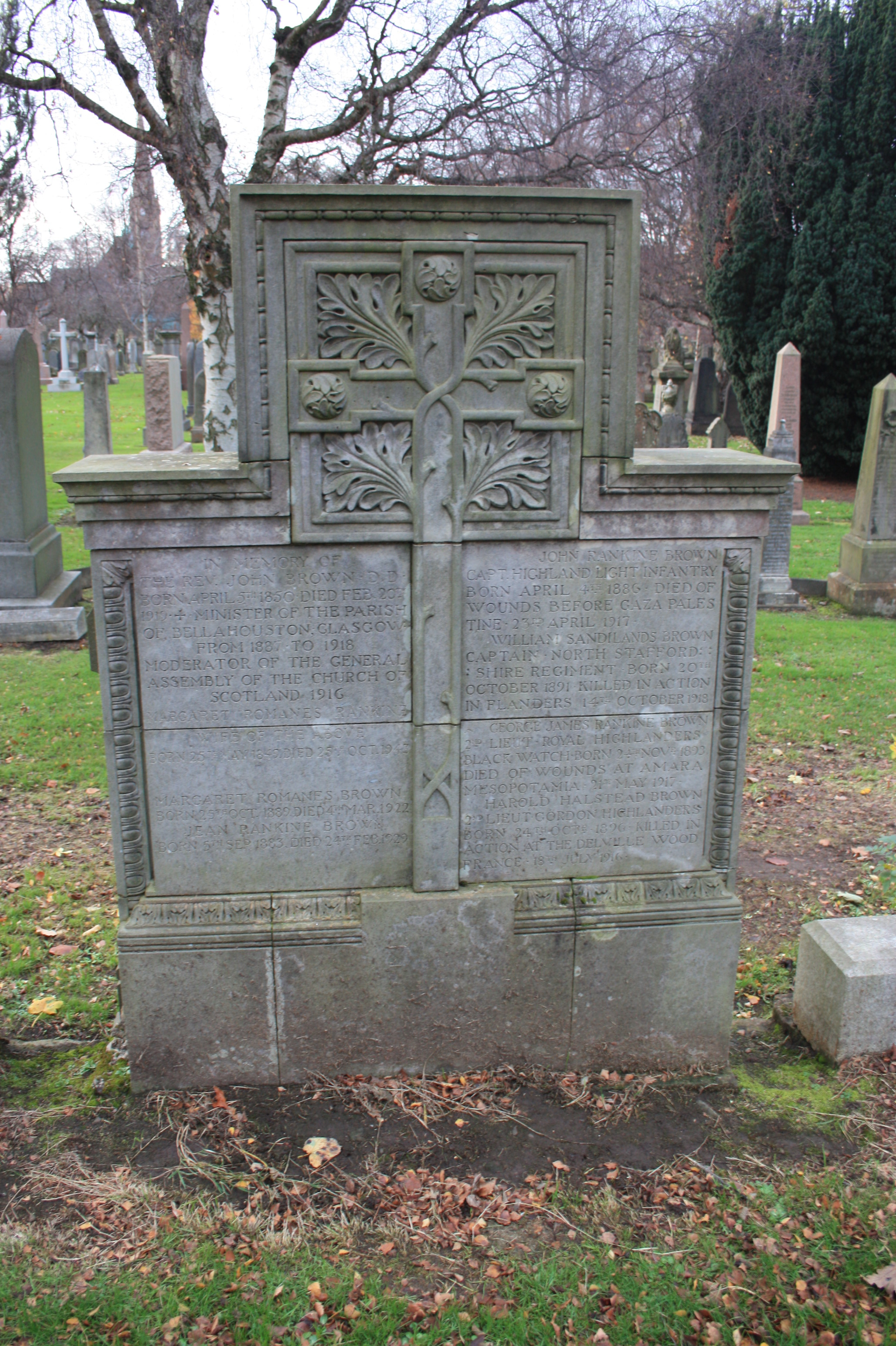
The grave of Very Rev John Brown, Grange Cemetery, Edinburgh

He was born on 5 April 1850.

From 1887 to 1918 he was minister of Bellahouston Church in Glasgow. In 1916 he replaced David Paul as Moderator of the General Assembly of the Church of Scotland, and he was replaced in turn in 1917 by James Cooper.

He died on 20 February 1919. He is buried with his family in Grange Cemetery in south Edinburgh.

== Family ==
He was married to Margaret Romanes Rankine (1849-1943) daughter of John Rankine a former Moderator (1883).

Four sons were killed in the First World War: John Rankine Brown (1886-1917) Captain in the Highland Light Infantry, was killed in Gaza in Palestine; William Sandilands Brown (1891-1918) Captain in the North Staffordshire Regiment, was killed in Flanders in the final weeks of the war; George James Rankine Brown (1893-1917), Second Lieutenant in the Black Watch. died of wounds at Amara in Mesopotamia; and Harold Halstead Brown (1896-1916) Second Lieutenant in the Gordon Highlanders, killed at Delville Wood in the Battle of the Somme.
