= John Rankine (legal scholar) =

Scottish legal author

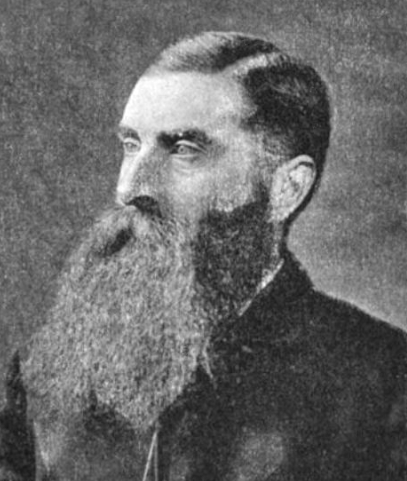
- Born: 18 February 1846; Sorn, Ayrshire, Scotland
- Died: 8 August 1922 (aged 76); Threepwood, Roxburghshire, Scotland
- Burial place: Dean Cemetery
- Education: Edinburgh Academy; University of Edinburgh
- Occupation: Legal scholar
- Parents: John Rankine (father); Jane Simpson (mother)

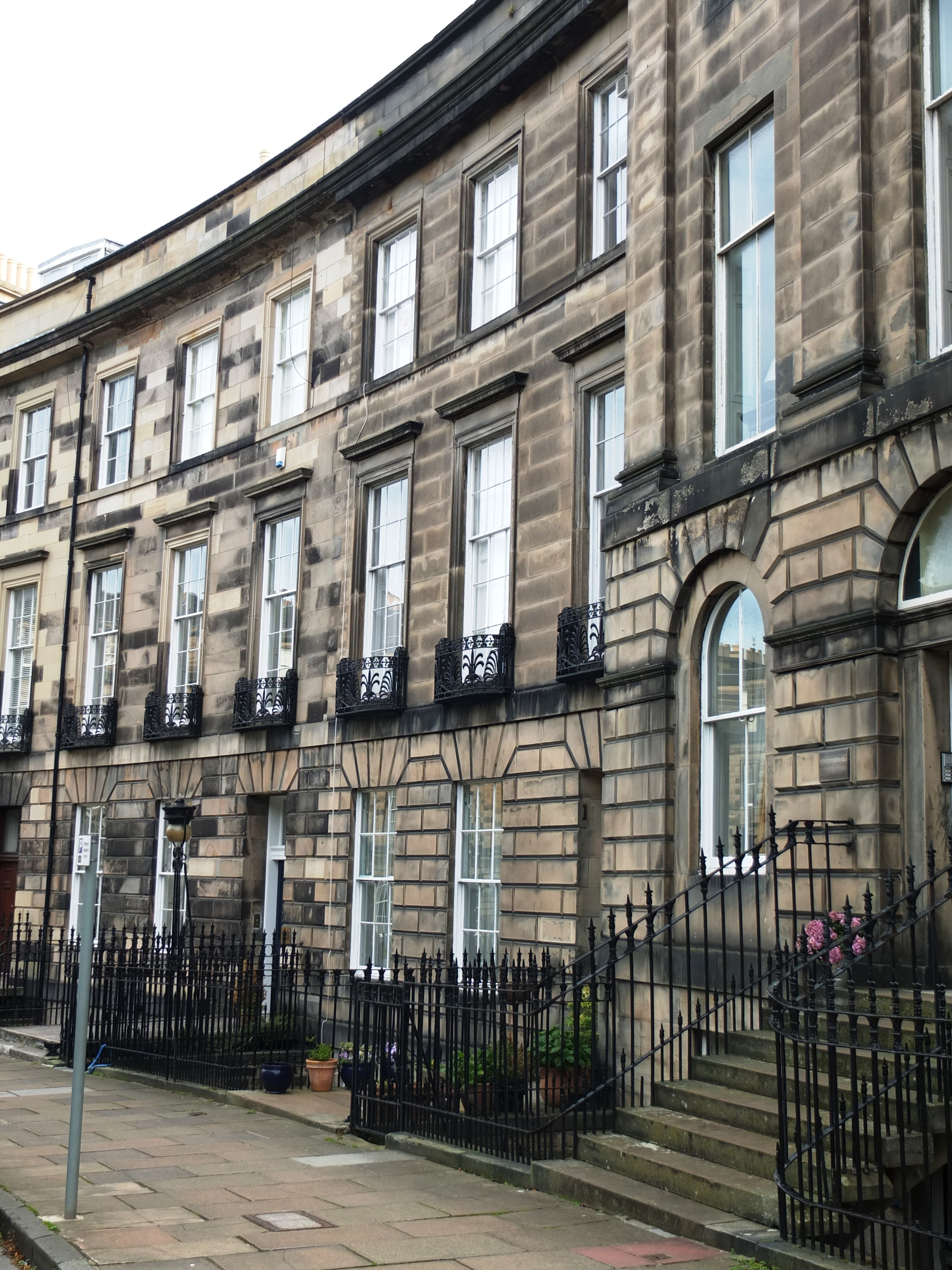
Sir John Rankine's house at 23 Ainslie Place

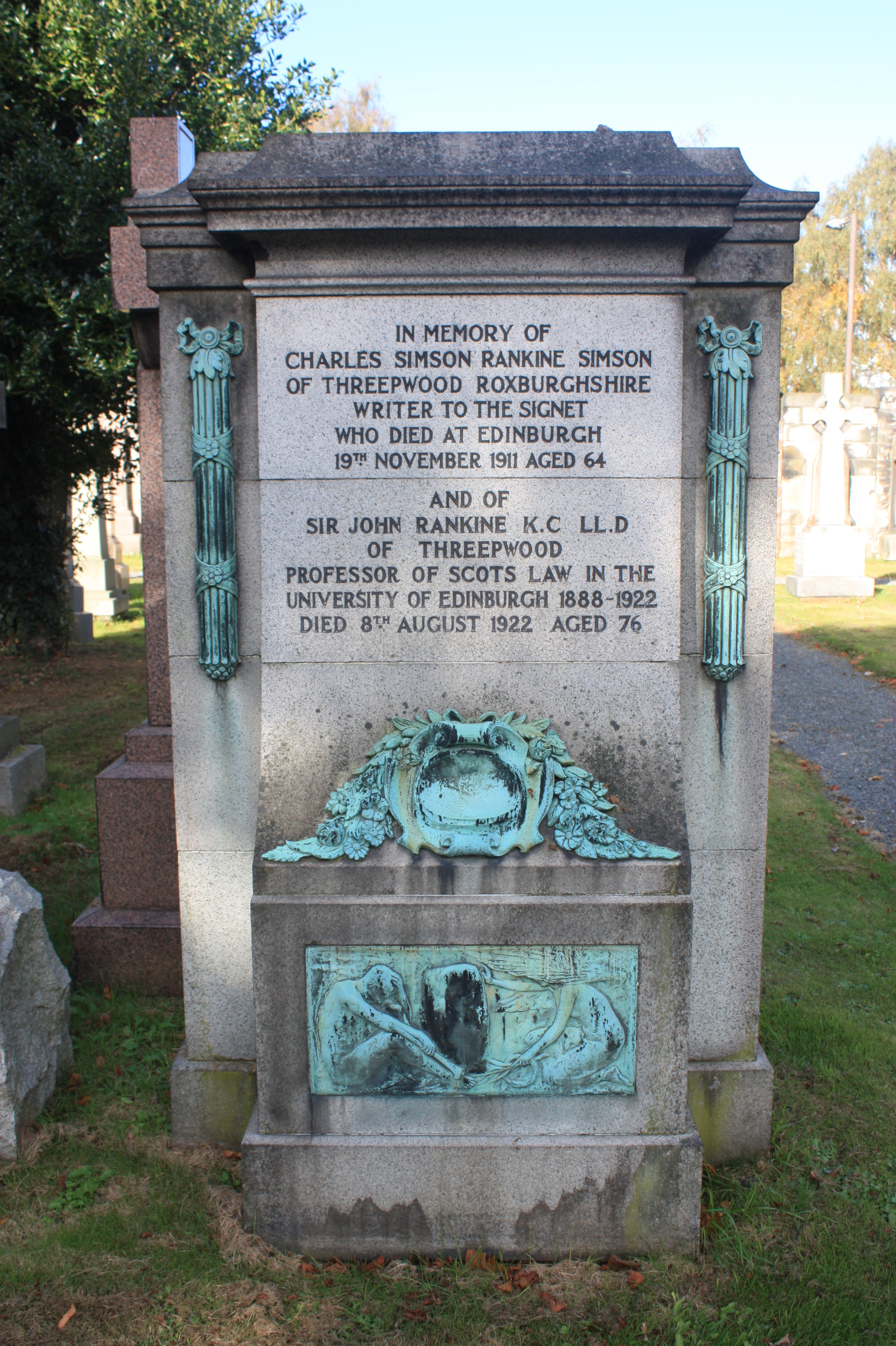
The grave of Sir John Rankine, Dean Cemetery

Sir John Rankine of Bassendean FRSE (18 February 1846 – 8 August 1922) was a Scottish legal author.

== Life ==
He was born in the manse at Sorn in Ayrshire on 18 February 1846, the son of Very Rev Dr John Rankine DD, the local minister, and Moderator of the General Assembly of the Church of Scotland in 1883, and his wife Jane Simpson (1795-1879).

He was educated locally then sent to Edinburgh Academy from 1859 to 1861. He then studied law at the University of Edinburgh graduating with an MA in 1865. He then undertook postgraduate study in Heidelberg in Germany.

He passed the Scottish Bar as an advocate in 1869. He became Advocate Depute in 1885. In 1888 he became Professor of Scots Law at the University of Edinburgh retaining this role until death. He lived at 23 Ainslie Place in Edinburgh's Moray Estate.

In 1891 he was elected a Fellow of the Royal Society of Edinburgh. His proposers were Sir Andrew Douglas Maclagan, Alexander Crum Brown, Lord Kinnear, and Robert Flint.

He inherited Threepwood through his maternal grandfather.

He was knighted by King George V in 1921.

He died at Threepwood in Roxburghshire on 8 August 1922 and was buried in Dean Cemetery in western Edinburgh. The grave lies in the first northern extension attaching to the original cemetery, facing south onto the central east–west path. He was unmarried and had no children.

== Publications ==
- The Law of Leases in Scotland (1887)
- The Law of Land Ownership in Scotland (1909)
- The Law of Personal Bar in Scotland (1921)
