= John Rankine (moderator) =

Scottish minister

John Rankine (1816–1885) was a Scottish minister who served as Moderator of the General Assembly of the Church of Scotland in 1883.

== Life ==
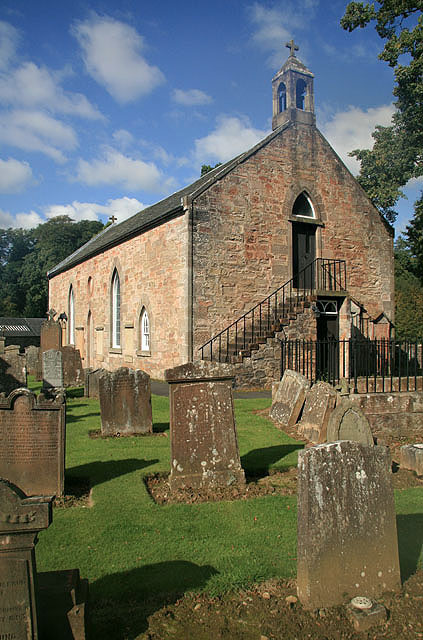
Sorn Parish Church

He was born in Maybole in Ayrshire on 28 December 1816 the fourth child of John Rankine and Marion Sloane. His ancestors were called McRankine, but his father simplified the name to Rankine. He was educated at Maybole Parish School then at Ayr Academy. He studied divinity at the University of Edinburgh graduating with an MA. In 1842 he was licensed to preach by the Presbytery of the Church of Scotland in Ayr. He worked briefly as an assistant minister in Lauder.

He moved to Sorn, then called Dalgain church, as assistant in 1843 and replaced Rev J Stewart as minister at Sorn in 1846. He was minister of Sorn in Ayrshire from 1846 to 1888.

In 1880 the University of Edinburgh awarded him an honorary doctorate (DD).

In 1883 he was elected Moderator of the General Assembly of the Church of Scotland in succession to Very Rev William Milligan.

He died on 30 April 1885 aged 88, and is buried in the churchyard at Sorn against the wall.

His position at Sorn was filled by Rev H.C. Begg.

== Family ==
In 1845 he married Jane Simson, the daughter of Charles Simson of Threepwood. Together they had nine children. Graham and Jane died in infancy, Marion Elizabeth Rankine married Very Rev Archibald Scott, Moderator in 1896, Margaret Romanes Rankine married Very Rev John Brown Moderator in 1916 and John, a legal author.
