= Trysting tree =

Tree chosen as a meeting place

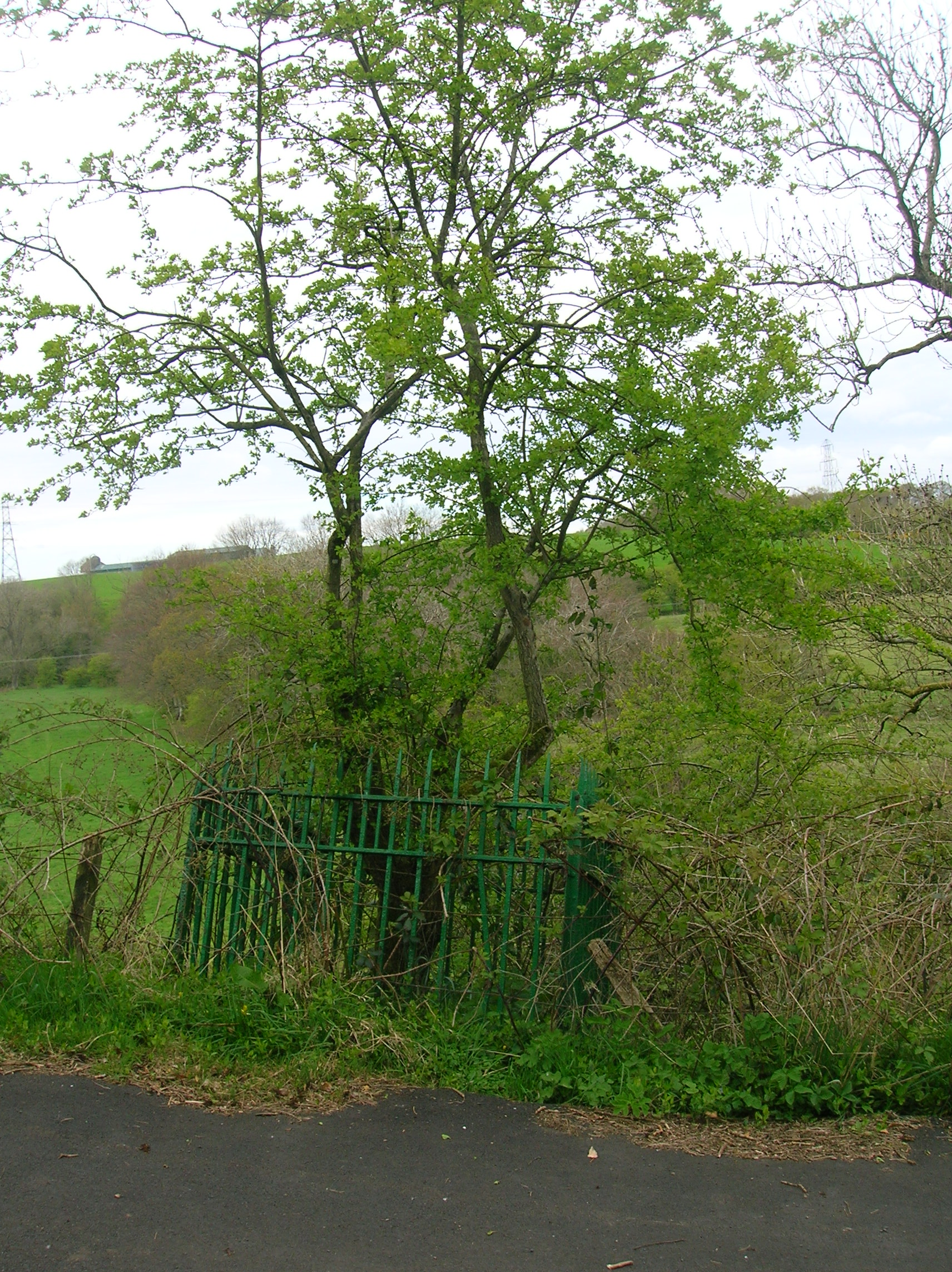
The trysting tree at Millmannoch Mill, Scotland.

Trysting trees are trees of any species which have, through their individual prominence, appearance, or position, been chosen as traditional or popular meeting places for meetings for specific purposes. Names, dates, and symbols are sometimes found carved on the bark, favouring trees with smoother bark, such as beech, hornbeam and sycamore.

Many other forms of landscape features have served as trysting places, such as the Lochmaben Stone on the border of Scotland and England. It was a well known, well recognised and easily located 'marker' on the Scottish Marches and where a number of functions were performed prior to the Union of the Crowns, such as arranging truces, exchanging prisoners, etc.

== Etymology ==
A 'tryst' is a time and a place for a meeting, especially of lovers. In Old French the word meant an appointed station in hunting. It is likely from an Old Norse source sharing its origin with 'traust', and the Modern English 'trust' (and thus also related to the Old English 'treowe' which survives as the modern 'true'). A trysting day is an arranged day of meeting or assembling, as of soldiers, friends, lovers and the like.

== History ==
Many trees have through their isolation, appearance or position been chosen as popular meeting places for young courting couples, soldiers called to gather at a distinctive venue prior to battle, etc. Many a romantic story features trysting trees, including the tales of Robin Hood and his merry men. In the 1845 version of the story, Maid Marian and Robin Hood are buried together under their "Trysting Tree". Scott's Ivanhoe and Sir Arthur Conan Doyle's The White Company make several references to trysting trees.

In Sir Walter Scott's Waverley the large decaying trunk of a trysting tree lies on Tully-Veolan moor and is still used as a meeting place.

== Surviving and previously recorded examples ==
=== Scotland ===
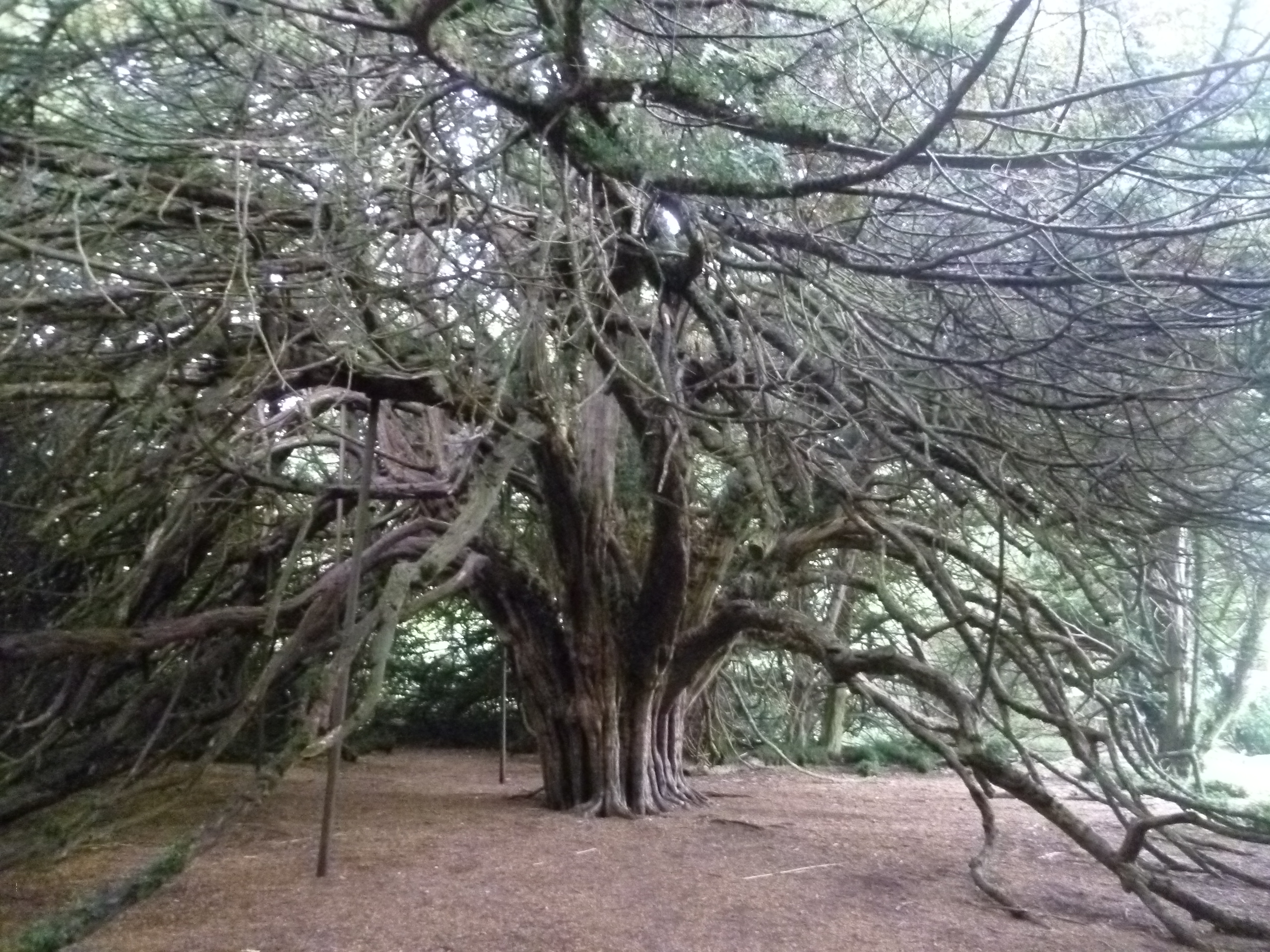
Ormiston Yew, East Lothian

The 'Auld Yew Tree of Loudoun' was a place where the Earl of Loudoun, colleagues and advisers met to discuss drafts of the Treaty of Union with England in 1603; it was also the tree to which Lord James of Loudoun addressed letters to his 'gudewife' during his exile in Holland.

The 'Colliers' Oak' near Dailly in Ayrshire was the meeting place of the Laird of Dalquharran and the local colliers regularly met to discuss business matters.

The 'Great Yew of Ormiston' was recognised as a local landmark as early as the 15th century. In 1474 records show that the Earl of Hopetoun met here and signed various estate documents. A local history, published in 1883, describes the tree as "a favourite resort of the Reformers" around the time of the Scottish Reformation. According to local lore, the Protestant reformer John Knox preached at the tree.

The Covin Trysting Tree, Bemersyde, Melrose, Grid Ref: NT 593 334, is a Sweet Chestnut (Castanea sativa) with a height of 12.6 m and a diameter of 252 cm and is 500–800 years old. The tree has long been a feature of Bemersyde, appearing in many paintings of the house including a sketch by Turner, located in the British Museum, London. The tree is thought to have been planted in the 12th century by Petrus de Haga, making it 800 years old.

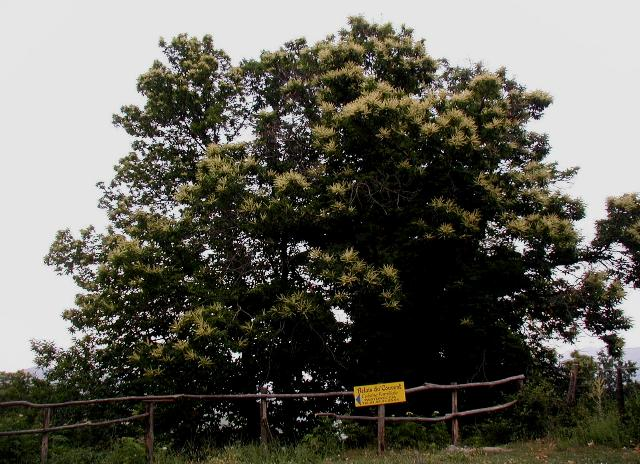
The Covin Trysting Sweet Chestnut tree at Bemersyde

Although the original trunk has now died, layers were taken by Earl Haig in the 1950s resulting in several new healthy stems rising from the base. One of the layers, planted about 30 metres from the original, is growing into a fine looking individual. The old rings that can be seen in the branches of the original Covin Tree were once attached to concrete weights which aimed to balance the trunk – in its younger days the tree was twice as high as it is now.

The 'Kissing Beech' is located at Kilravock Castle, Inverness-shire. This ancient 'layering' beech took its name from an occasion when a member of the local laird's family was caught in the middle of a kiss with a maid under the tree's canopy. It carries the names of many pairs of lovers and symbols of their devotion inscribed in its venerable expanse of smooth bark.

The 'Great Fraser Yew' may be as much as 700 years old and once served as the rallying point of the Clan Fraser members in times of trouble.

Kelso, in the Scottish Borders has a 'trysting tree' which is connected with the annual Common Ridings.

The locally famous trysting place of the 'Three Thorns of Carlinwalk', this being an old name for Castle Douglas in Dumfries and Galloway, are recorded in the Ordnance Gazetteer of Scotland.

==== Robert Burns ====
Robert Burns writes of a trysting thorn tree (see below) at the Mill of Mannoch at Coylton in South Ayrshire. A new hawthorn tree was planted on the site and iron railings placed around it. This tree still survives (2012).

The National Burns Collection holds a cross section of thorn wood from a tree which grew at the Mill of Mannoch, Coylton, Ayrshire which was said to be Robert Burns' "trysting thorn", a romantic meeting place. One polished surface of the thorn wood reads:

"At length I reached the bonnie glen,
Where early life I sported,
I pass'd the mill and trysting thorn,
Where Nancy aft I courted"

From Burns' poem "The Soldier's Return".

=== England ===
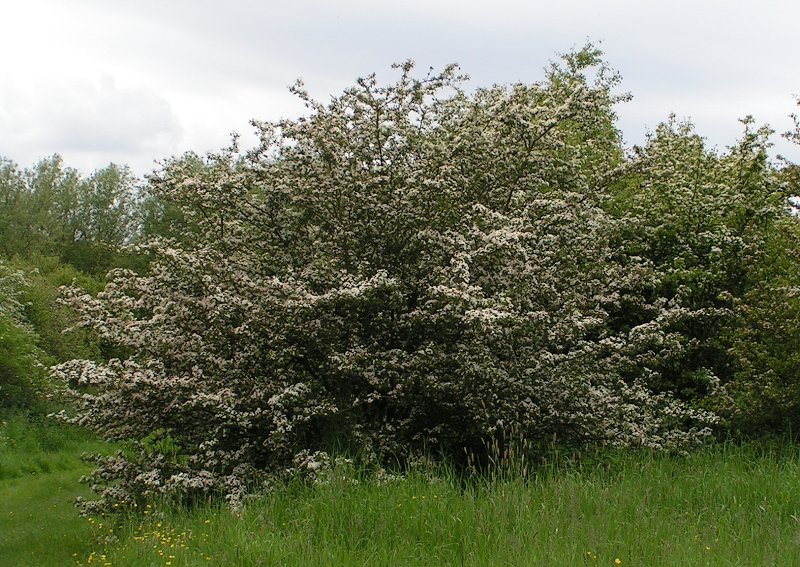
A hawthorn tree

There is a trysting tree to the memory of Robin Hood in the small wood just to the right hand side of Kiveton Lane at the north exit of Kiveton Park in South Yorkshire. The "venerable oak" was stated as "great trysting tree in the Hart-hill Walk" which was, in earlier times, a private road owned and maintained by the Dukes of Leeds, and now forms that part of Kiveton Lane between the Rectory's glebe land and Kiveton.

On the sandy heath of Barnham Cross Common in East Anglia used to be a pine tree about which curious customs have gathered. Called variously the Trysting Pine, Kissing Tree or Wishing Tree, the trunk had twisted and curled itself into a loop not far from the ground. One tradition said that a person had to pull off or knock down a single fir cone, hold it in the right hand, place one's head through the loop and make a wish. Another version told that couples must hold hands through the loop, then kiss and pledge undying love, hoping the tree would bind them to it with its magic.

=== America ===
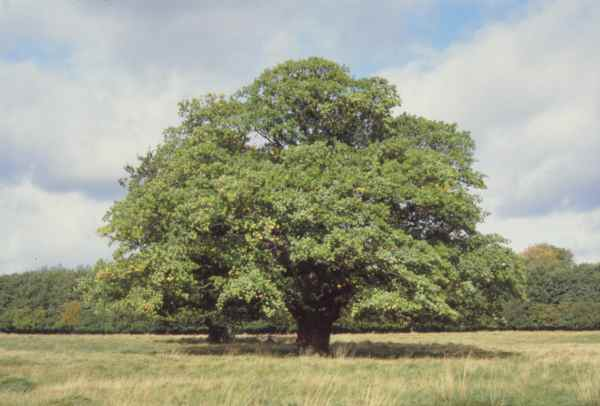
A pedunculate oak

In America the San Juan Capistrano 'Trysting Tree', a sycamore, is connected with the story of one notorious Tiburcio Vásquez, who used San Juan Capistrano and this tree for his gang's own purposes. The gang used the tree as a base to meet and divide up the spoils after a raid, secure food, and then head for the hills to hide out. Vasquez was quite active in this area. His gang raided pueblos, stole cattle, and even held up the Seely and Wright stage coach that travelled between Santa Ana and San Diego.

The Trysting Tree at Oregon State University, in the US, was a large Gray Poplar (Populus × canescens) located southeast of Benton Hall, and was a popular gathering spot on campus. According to one story, George Coote, a faculty member in Horticulture, planted the tree between 1880 and 1885. An early alumnus claimed that the Trysting Tree was so named because of its "magical effects on students, especially in springtime". The tree's popularity was such that the Board of Regents felt obliged to place two arc lights on the cupola of Benton Hall (then the administration building) "to keep the tree from being overworked". On September 27, 1987, the original Trysting Tree was cut down because of advanced disease in its trunk and limbs. Prior to its removal, Jack Stang (Department of Horticulture) took several cuttings from the tree and rooted them. One these "offshoots" (Trysting Tree II) was planted in 1982 near the original tree.

A poem, published in 1908, entitled The Trysting Tree, begins:

Beneath the faithful Trysting Tree,
A youth and maiden stand:
The youth, a noble lad is he,
Who claps the fair white hand;
The light that fills those earnest eyes,
Who can understand?

Its final lines are:

Long may'st thou live, thou worthy friend
Thou dear old Trysting Tree
Long may thy branches proudly wave
Majestic'ly and free
To mind us of those happy days
Spent at old O. A. C.*
