= Millmannoch =

Coordinates: 55.434516°N 4.480015°W

Millmannoch: Scottish Gaelic: Kilmannoch; Mill of Mannoch
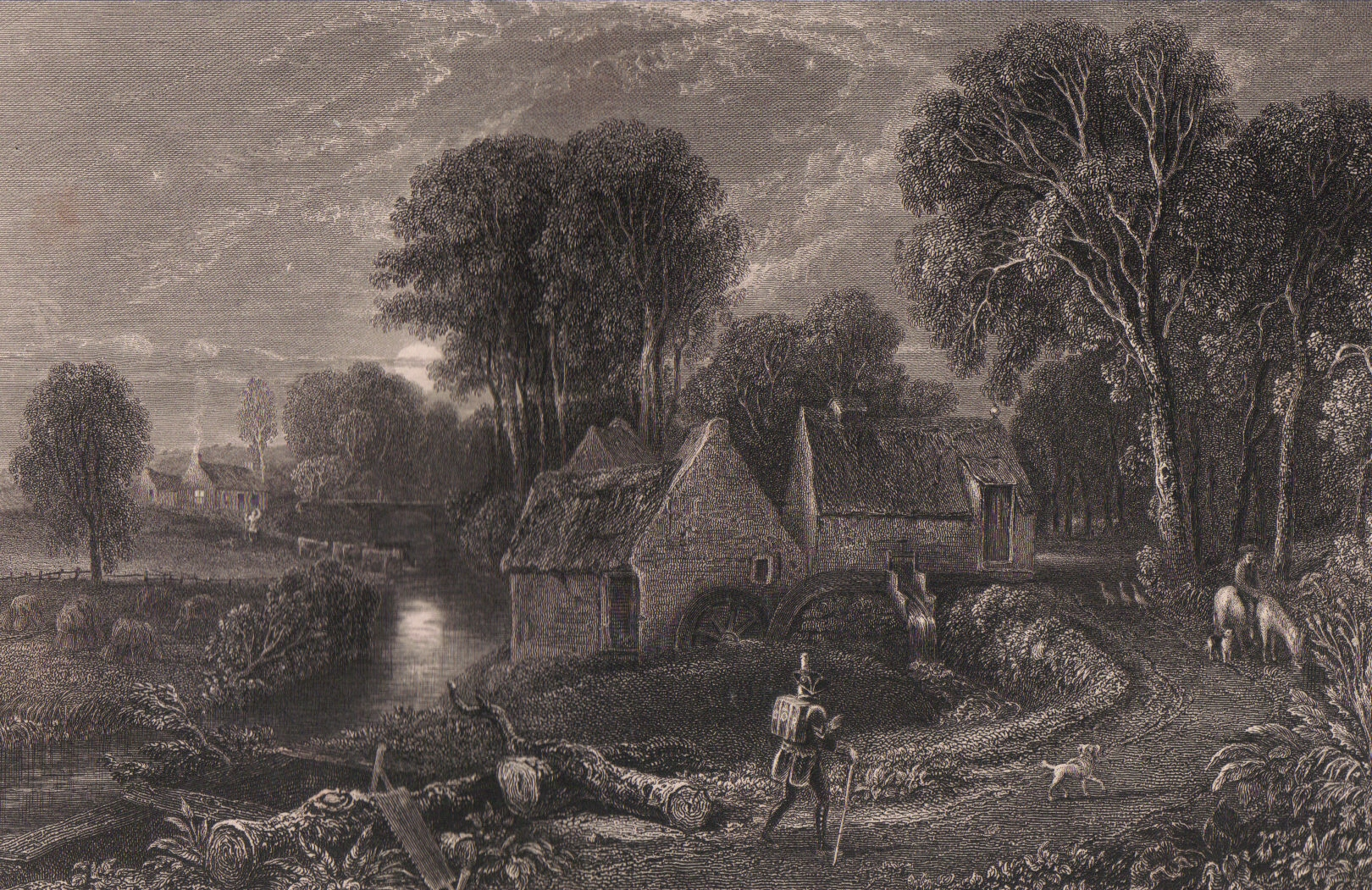
- The Mill of Monach in 1840

- Location within South Ayrshire
- OS grid reference: NS 432 184
- Council area: South Ayrshire
- Lieutenancy area: Ayrshire and Arran
- Country: Scotland
- Sovereign state: United Kingdom
- Police: Scotland
- Fire: Scottish
- Ambulance: Scottish

Millmannoch, also once known locally as the 'Mill of Mannoch' or Kilmannoch, is a ruined mill and hamlet in the old Barony of Sundrum, South Ayrshire, Parish of Coylton, Scotland about a mile from Coylton and Drongan. The 'Trysting Tree' of Robert Burns's poem The Soldier's Return stood nearby. A smithy was once located here in addition to the miller's cottage and later, a farm.

== Situation ==
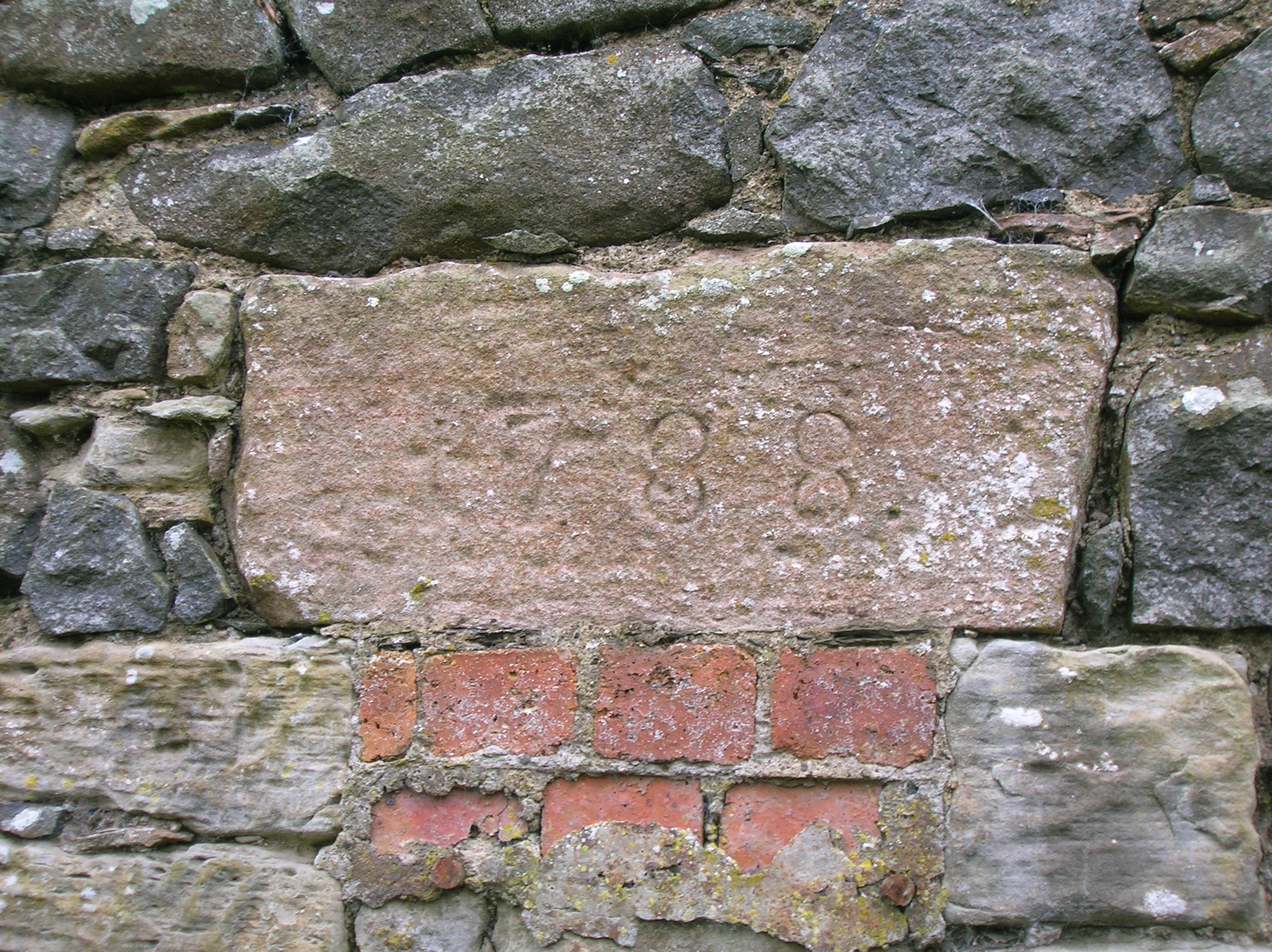
1788 datestone

Nineteenth-century historian Paterson described it as being "on the south bank, not far from the 'Craigs o'Kyle', and a more lovely spot never inspired a poet's fancy. The Coyl winds round the mill in serpentine form, in a dark, deep, and rather narrow stream, over which the ash and elm throw their gigantic arms, and in summer, with their waving foliage, almost prevent the sun's beams from playing upon its waters. At the bend, where stands the mill, which is driven by water conveyed from a considerable distance above, the stream is spanned by a rustic bridge for foot passengers, beneath which the waters run in a deep channel, peculiarly pleasing to the eye of the angler."

The weir, on the Water of Coyle, was at the Mill o'Shiel and water, having driven the old water wheel, was discharged into the Millmannoch Dam from which a circa one-mile long lade conveyed it to the retaining dam above the mill at Millmannoch. From there the water power was regulated by a sluice to the water wheel or later a turbine.

== History ==
Millmannoch, Milnmannoch or Kilmanoch (cell of the monk) was in the old barony of Sundrum, in 1373 held by Sir Duncan Wallace, who had also the barony of Dalmellington. Sir Duncan, although married to Eleanor Bruce, Countess of Carrick, had no offspring and his nephew, Sir Allan Cathcart, inherited, bring with him the possession of the barony of Auchincruive. Large portions of these lands were sold off and the remnants were made into one free barony in 1713 under the name of Cathcart, with Millmannoch as the barony mill, holding still a large amount of multures.

In 1758 the Cathcart barony was sold by Charles Shaw of Sauchrie, Lord Cathcart, to James Murray of Broughton. Murray sold the Sundrum part of the barony with the mill and lands of Milnmannoch (sic) and Bankhead to one John Hamilton and it remained with the family for one hundred and fifty five years. The lands of Milnmannoch and Bankhead were held by one John Morton.

Part of the smithy at Millmannoch was still standing in the early 20th century with in front of it a large granite boulder sunk to ground level with a "dog" fixed into it for cart wheel shods, the metal band or ring on a cartwheel.

Mr. John Thom took four leases of Mill Mannoch in his lifetime, each of fifteen years, his second lease being taken in 1792.

=== The operation of the mill ===
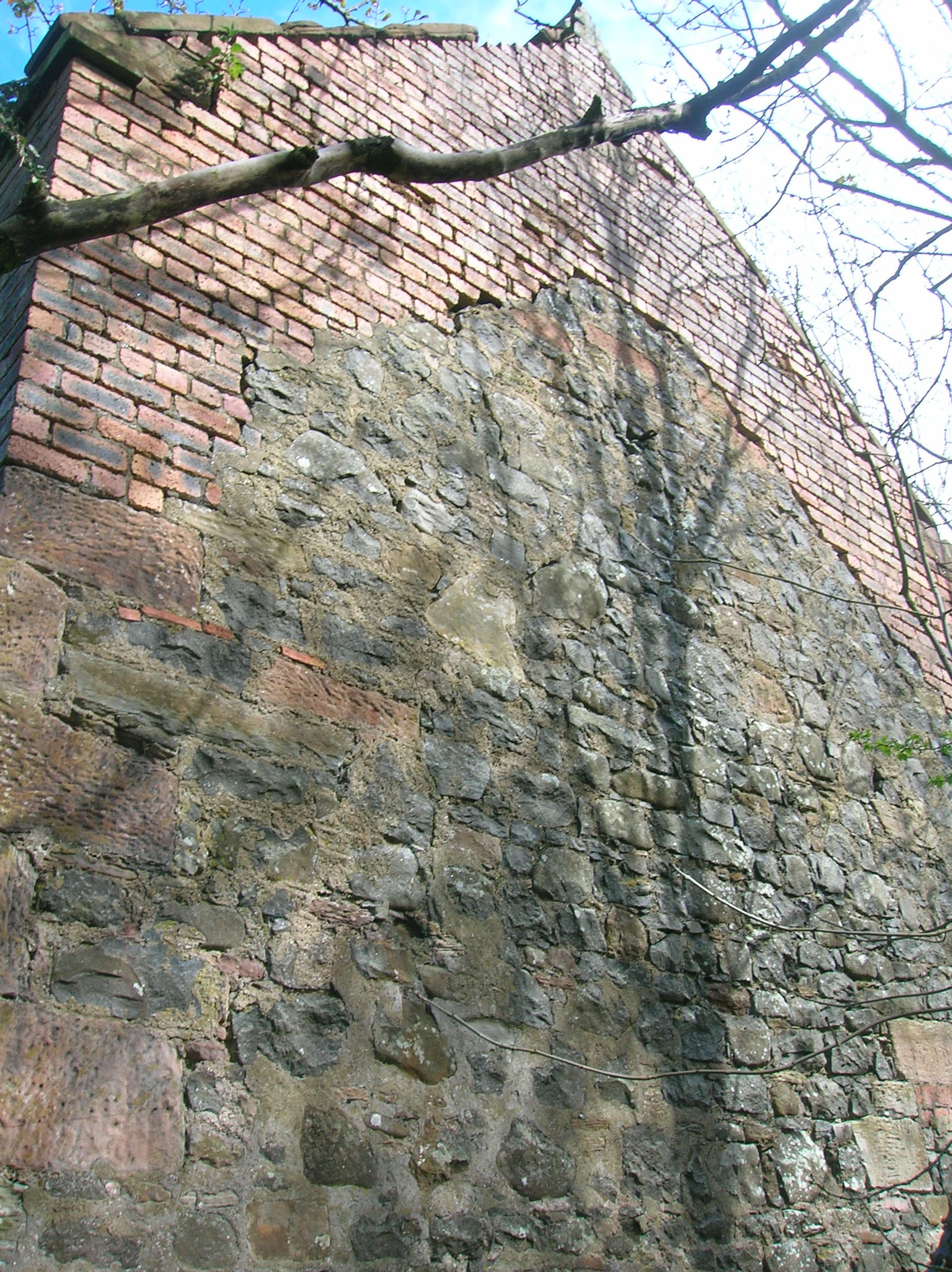
Gable end showing building alterations

A wooden breast wheel with steel gearing was still in use up until 1884 when improvements included a new iron overshot wheel with gearing for one pair of stones. The set proved less than satisfactory, and in 1902 the whole machinery was replaced. The wheel was removed and a Hercules water turbine was installed with a belt drive. It operated at speed of 450 revolutions and if the gate was fully opened moved 600 cubic feet of water per minute through a single pipe of 21 in. diameter. The changes are very apparent in the gable ends and side walls where the enlargements to the mill were built with brick.

The lade ran almost a mile from the weir on the Water of Coyle at Mill o'Shiel. Three stone axes were discovered on one occasion when it was cleaned.

=== Grindstones ===
Millmannoch Mill was supplied with one pair of Kameshill stones from West Kilbride for shelling, one pair of French burr for finishing oatmeal and one pair "Eversharp" for provender. These last stones were invented and made by Joseph Trapp, Pilsten, Austria-Hungary, and were said to be the first such grindstones to be used in Scotland. These grindstone were made from re-constituted rock, put into a mould and pressed like a cheese in a chisset mould. These stones were easier to manufacture, therefore cheaper, worked well enough, and were easier to dress or sharpen.

Before being gutted by fire the mill was still used on occasions, powered by a tractor. The mill pond and much of the lade have been infilled.

== Archaeology and etymology ==
Whilst the lade from the weir at Mill O'Shiel was being cleaned, three stone axes were found. One of them was flint of the "Doggerbank" or "Grime's Graves" class, well shaped, rounded on the face with the other end narrow and had been sharp.

The old name for Millmannoch is recorded as 'Kilmannoch' and it is suggested that this name could indicate an early religious foundation of some kind at this site. Kilmarnoc may be the original name, indicating a dedication to St Marnock. Kilmannoch may means the chapel of the monks.

== Association with Robert Burns ==
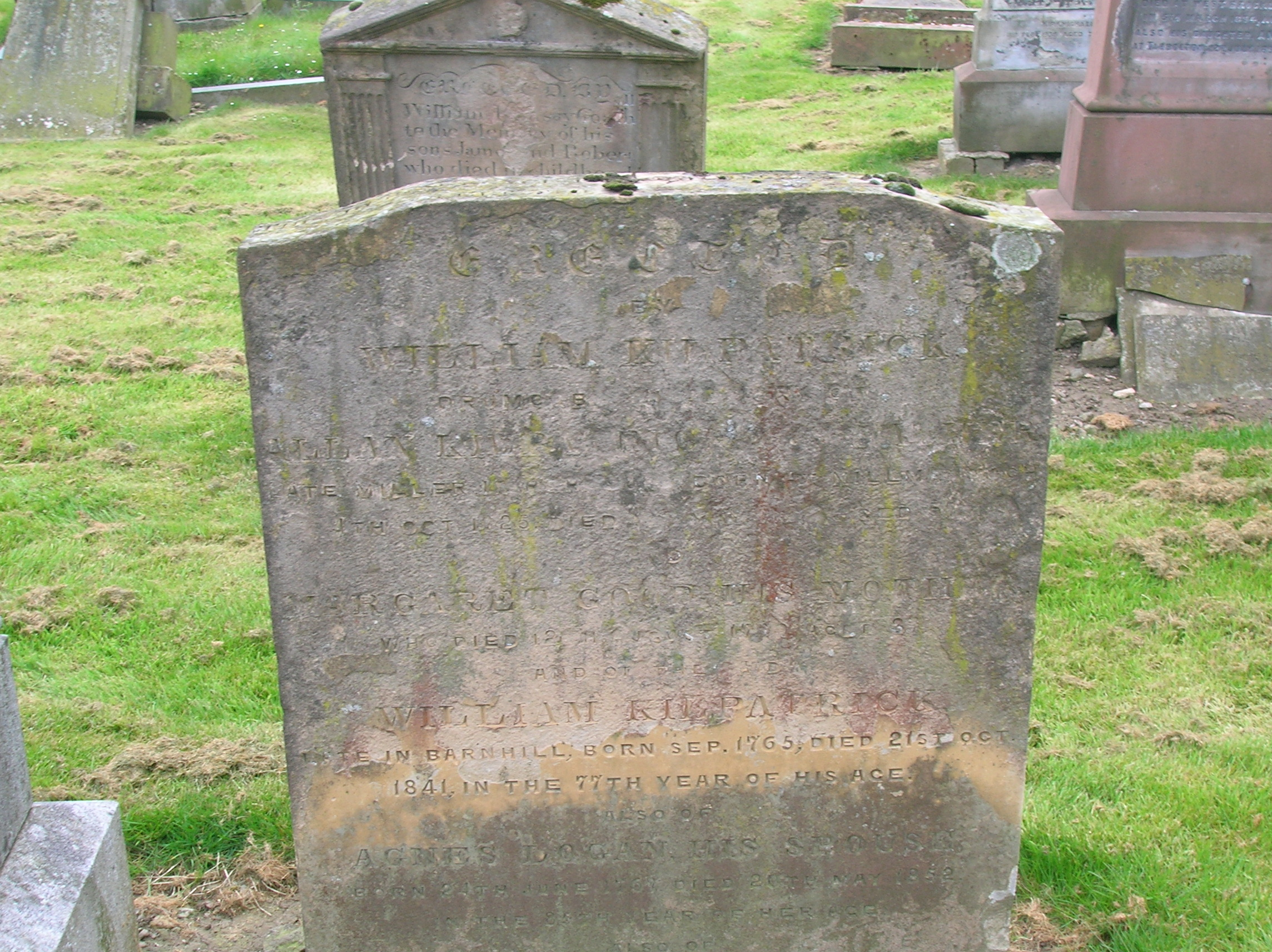
The gravestone of Nelly's parents at the old Coylton kirk, Low Coylton

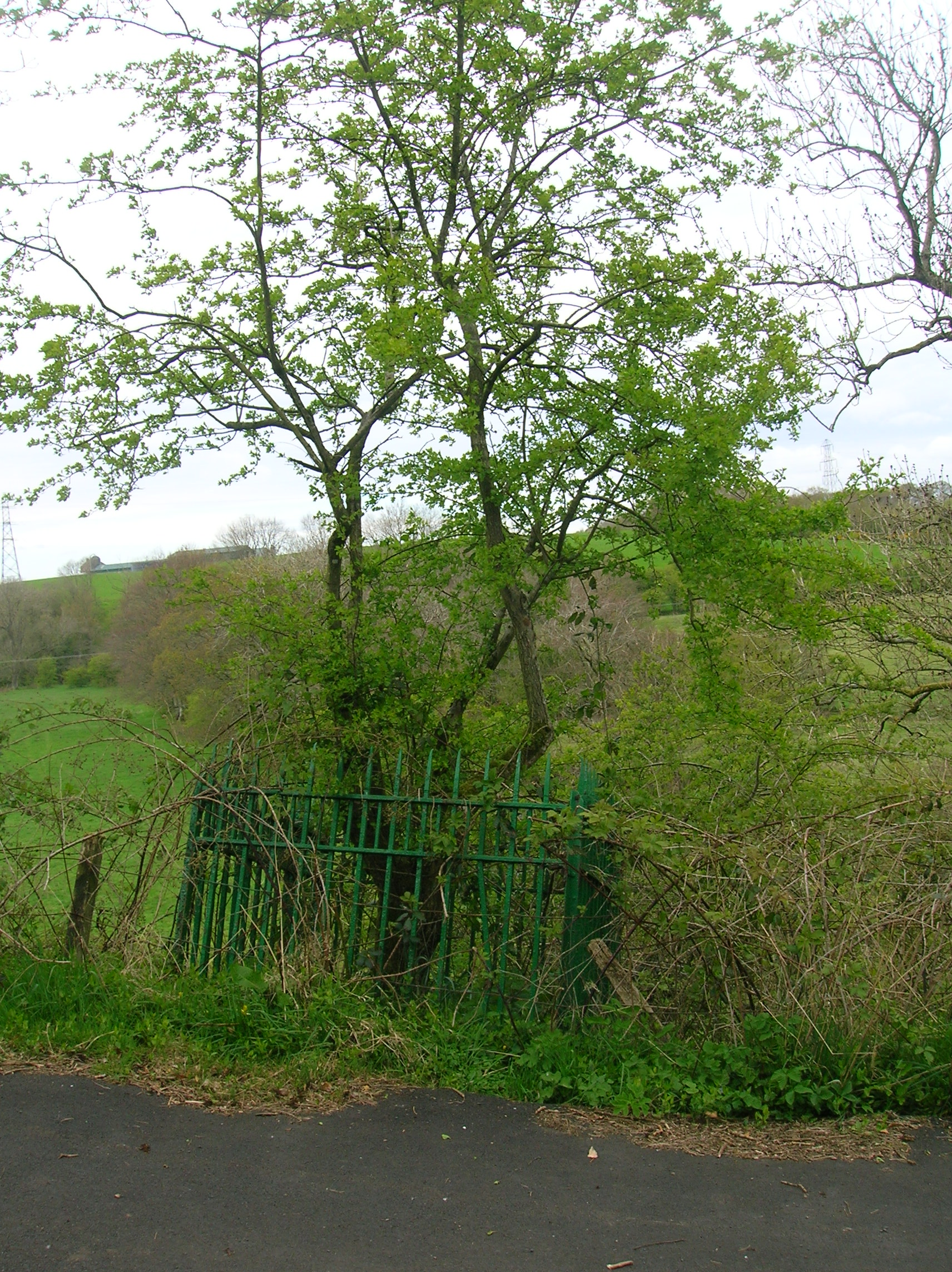
The Millmannoch Trysting Tree

=== Nelly Kilpatrick ===
Burns's 'Handsome Nell' may have been born here to Allan Kilpatrick. He later moved to Perclewan Mill and worked as both a miller and a blacksmith. Burns's home at the time, Mount Oliphant, was no great distance away, being about one and a half miles up the hill.

=== The Soldier's Return ===
Millmannoch is the mill of the "Soldier's Return" by Burns, written whilst at Ellisland Farm. Discharged soldiers of the Royal North British Fusiliers made their way back home from the depot at Dumfries via this old road to the Ayr depot and Burns wished to feature this regiment in his ballad.

At length I reached the bonnie glen,
Where early life I sported;
I passed the mill and trysting thorn,
Where Nancy aft I courted.
Wha spied I but my ain dear maid,
Down by her mother's dwelling!
And turn'd me round to hide the flood,
That in my een was swelling.

Burns knew the Mannoch Road well, having been seen passing the mill on several recorded occasions on journeys from Mauchline to Dalrymple, when one John Thom was the miller. Thom related seeing Burns standing on the road viewing and meditating on the beauty of the surrounding countryside. He used to cross the Water of Coyle by the old footbridge at Cairnstone, stepping into the glen that he described as 'bonnie' and about one hundred yards further on reached the local "Trysting Thorn" and, in about the same distance again, Bankhead, the home of the mother of Nancy of the poem was reached. Bankhead was later abandoned, as was nearby Sandyknowe, and by the 1940s only basic foundations remained in situ.

Millmannoch had always been recognised as a popular trysting spot in the locality, before, during and after Burns's time and even into the late 20th century. The tree and its tradition were well known to Burns.

=== The Trysting Thorn ===
Old photographs show this hawthorn tree to have been typical of its kind, but in an idyllic and remote location. The original tree died in 1916 and the miller at the time, James Pearson Wilson, left it for two years to see it would recover at all. He then had it cut down and the trunk divided into sections that were sent to the Mauchline box works where they were made into gavels and small plaques bearing the appropriate words from his poem. In the years since then, James Wilson distributed these relics of Burns among all the important Burns Societies and museums in the world, including America, Mexico, Australia, India, all over Europe and throughout the United Kingdom.

Seedlings from the original tree were cultivated and one was replanted, a set of iron railings proving to be necessary to deter souvenir collectors. The tree is healthy; however, it and its railings were slipping down into the Water of Coyle circa 2010 on a section of road now closed to vehicles and, in theory, pedestrians. In 2013 the railings were raised and the site fully restored by Burnsians.

When Wilson entered Millmannoch as a tenant there were actually two trees of significance on the lands, one the famous trysting thorn and the other a magnificent specimen of a plane or sycamore tree. A previous owner, Claude Hamilton, took great care of both and Wilson did likewise, with the result that the plane tree still stood in 1937, then valued at anything from £50 to £100.

== Views of Millmannoch Mill and the Water of Coyle ==
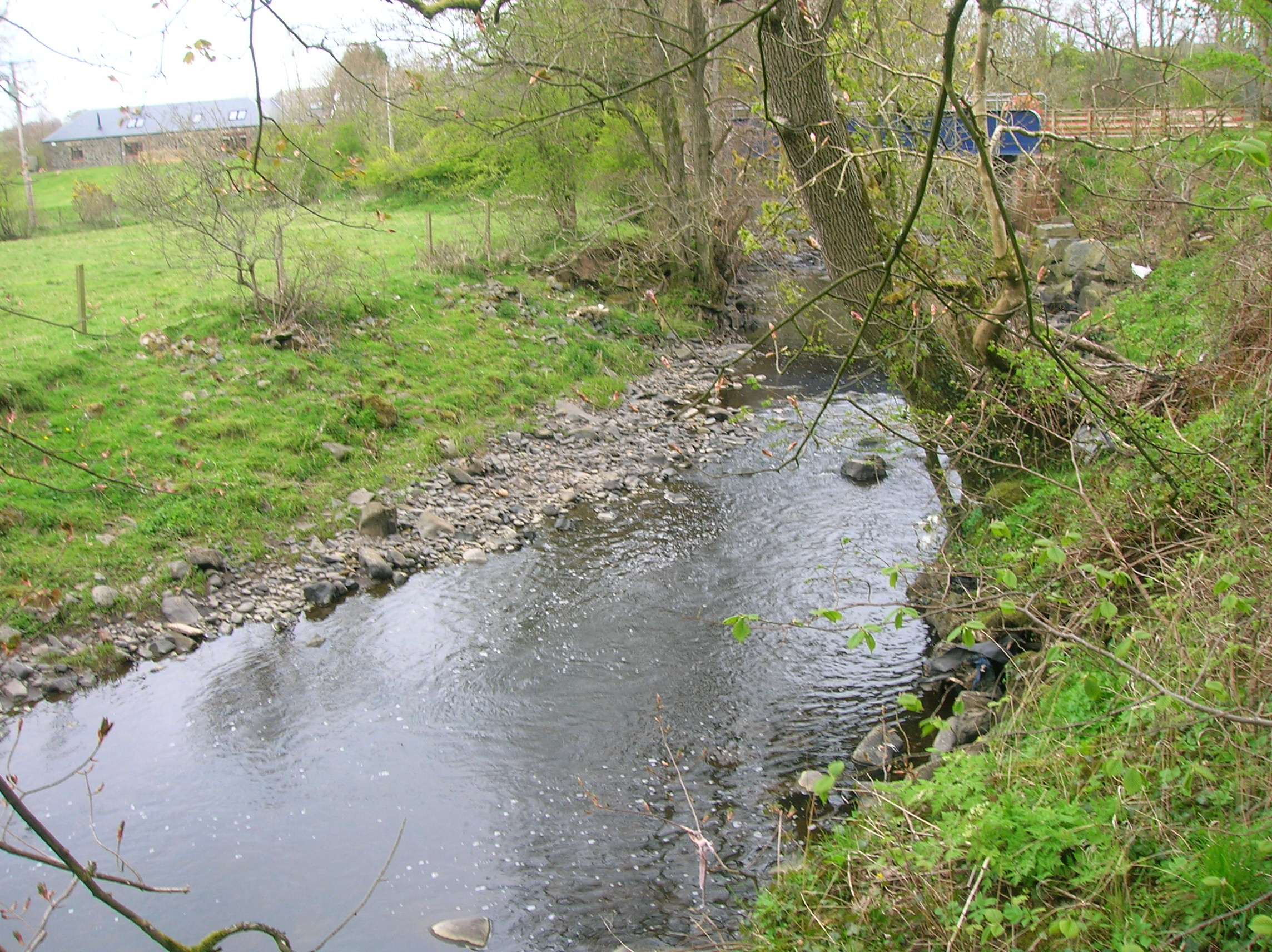
The Water of Coyle from Millmannoch

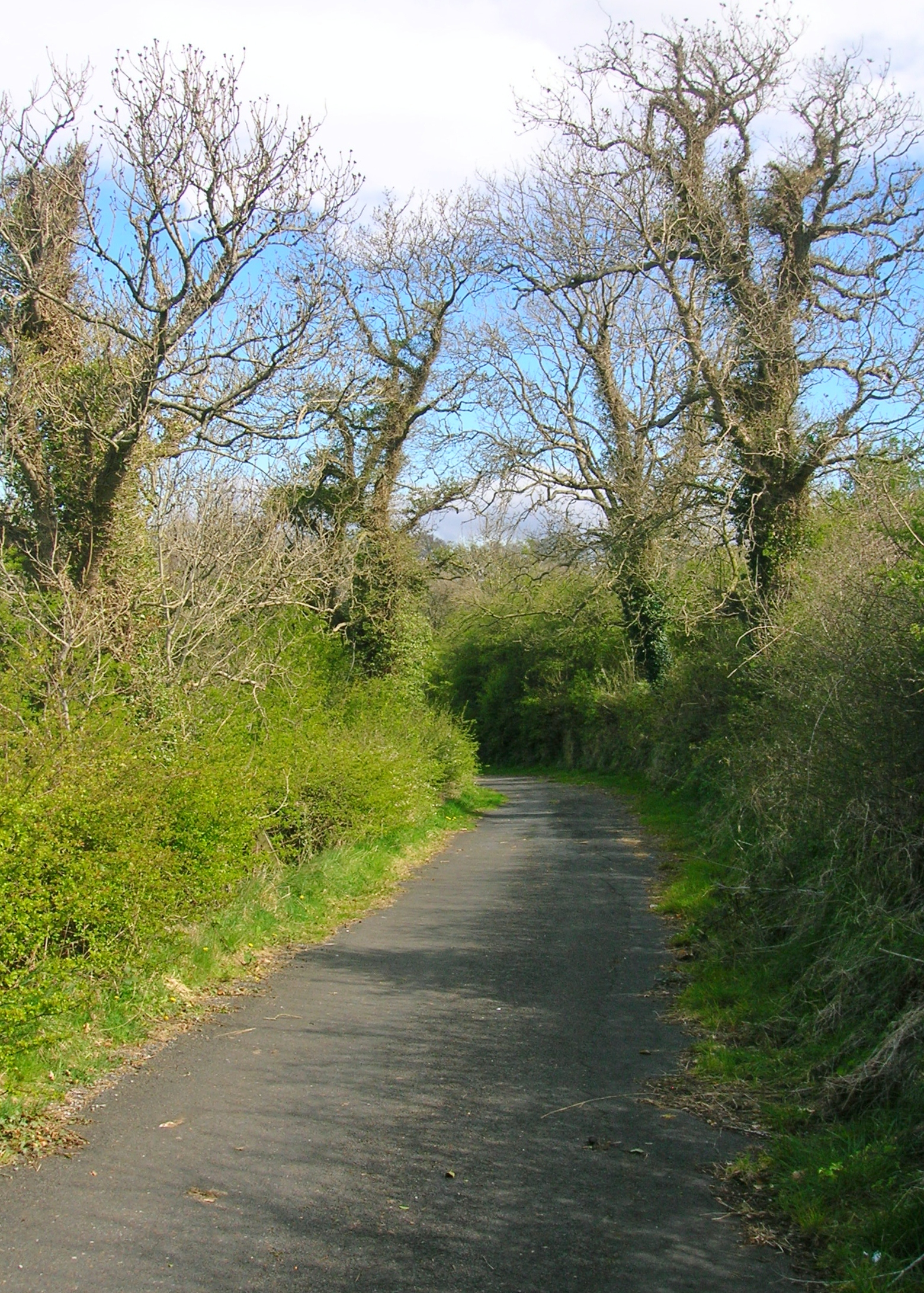
The old road to Millmannoch

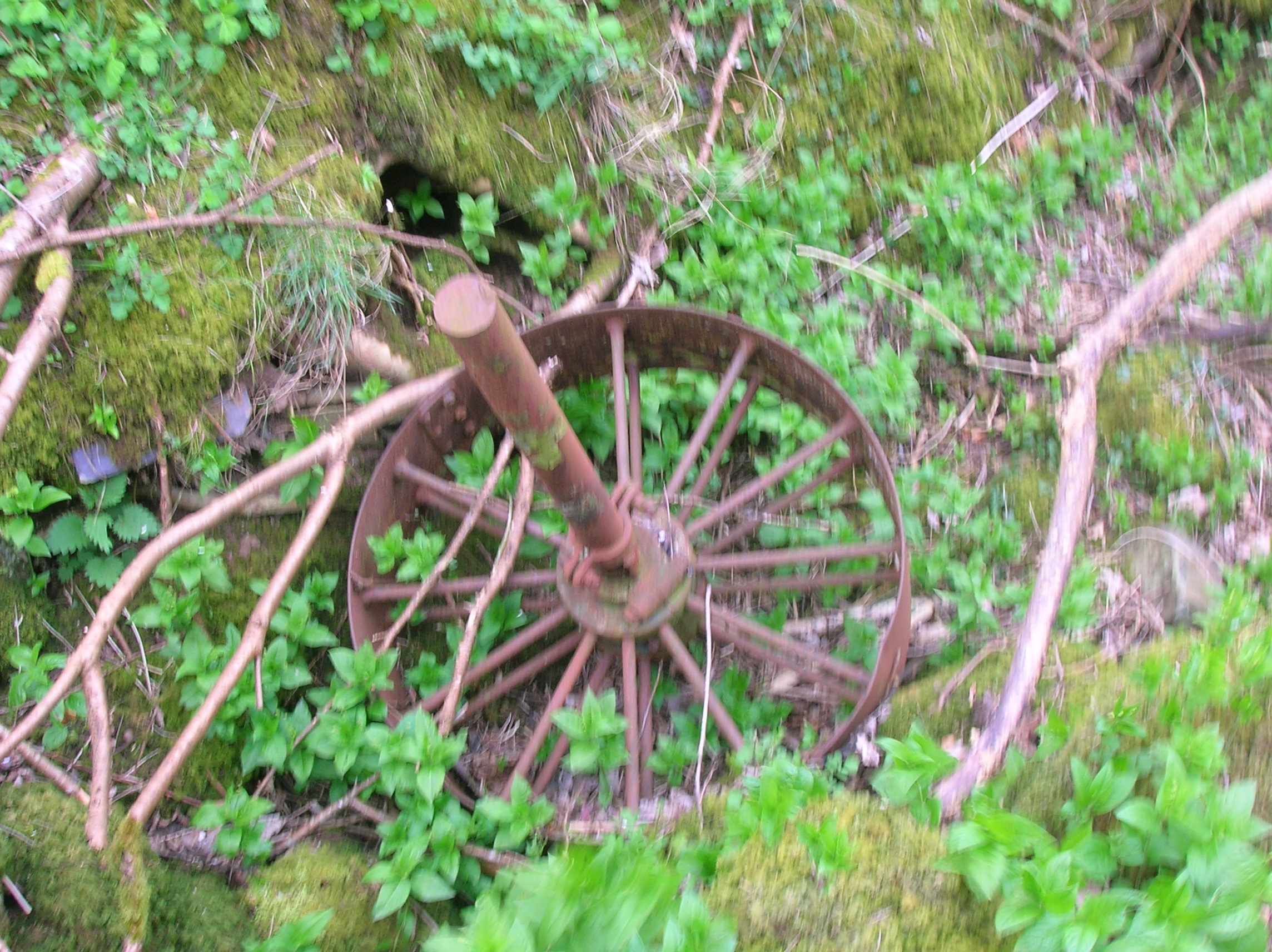
Part of the old Hercules turbine

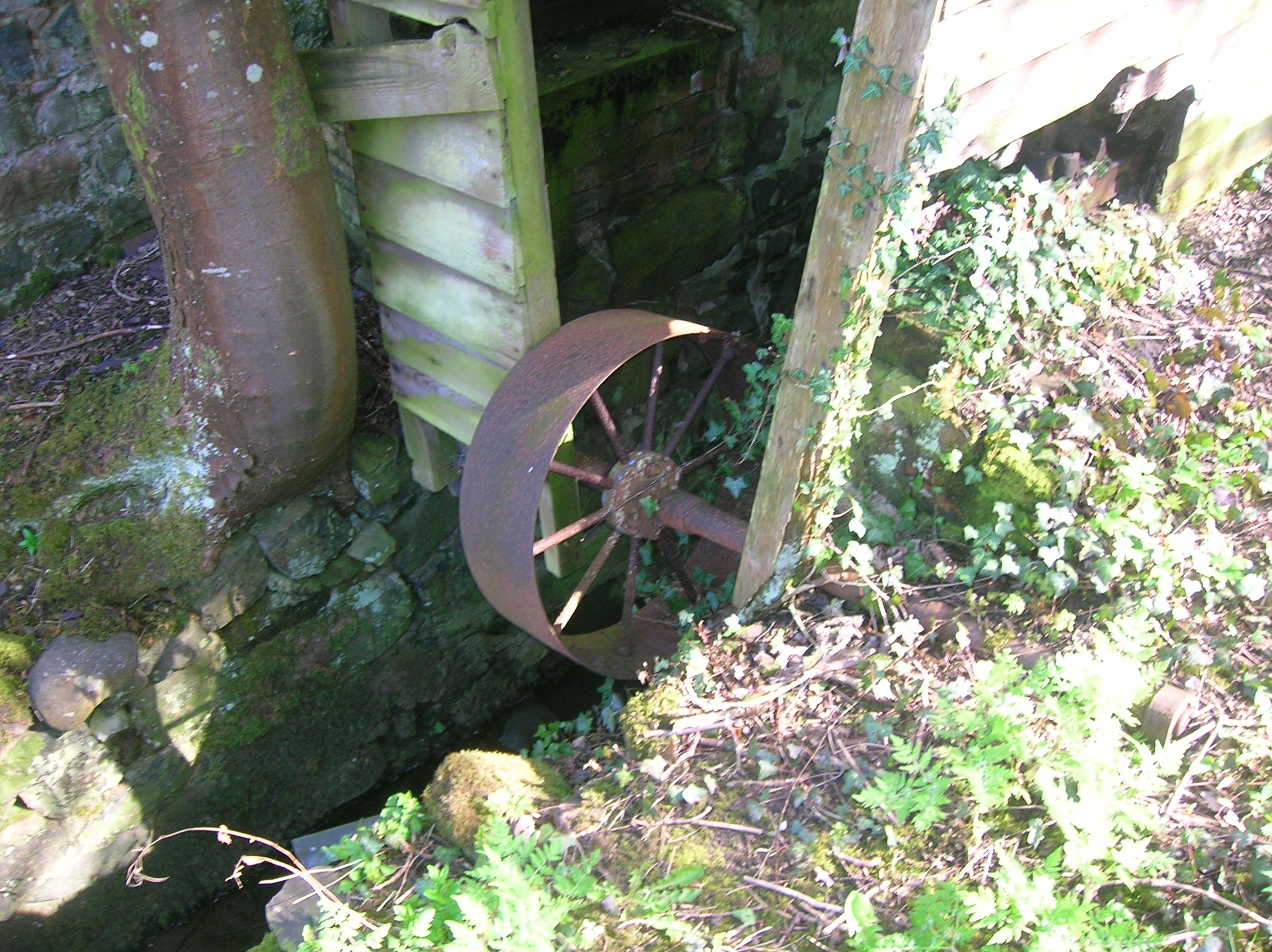
Old drive wheel

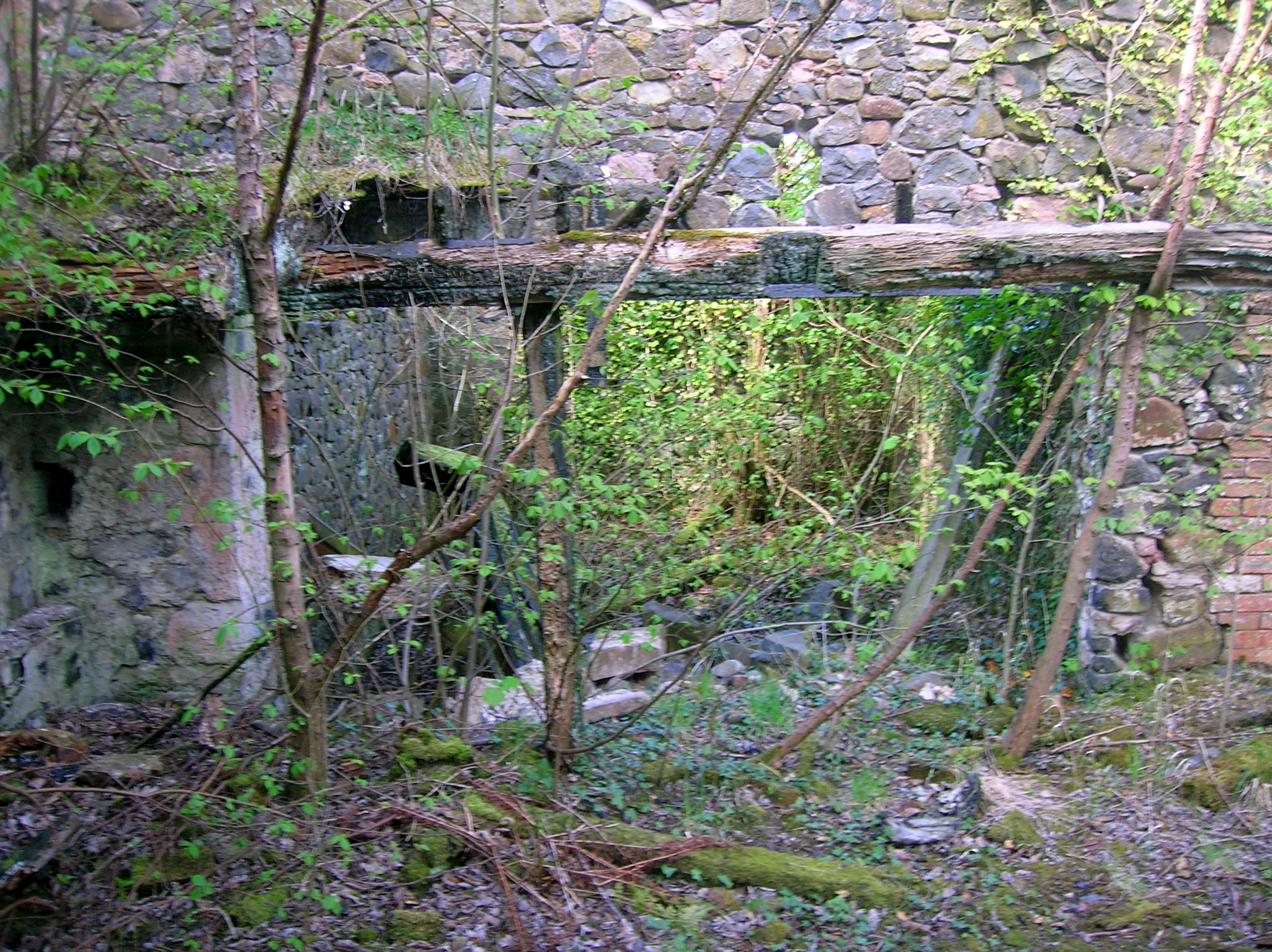
Interior of the old mill

== Natural history ==
There are mainly ash and sycamore trees, hawthorns and blackthorn shrubs, and herbs such as wood anemone, dogs mercury, and wood sorrel. Lesser periwinkle (Vinca minor), a non-native, has been planted at the Trysting Thorn at some point.
