= Sorn, East Ayrshire =

Village in East Ayrshire, Scotland

Coordinates: 55°30.59′N 4°17.4′W

Sorn
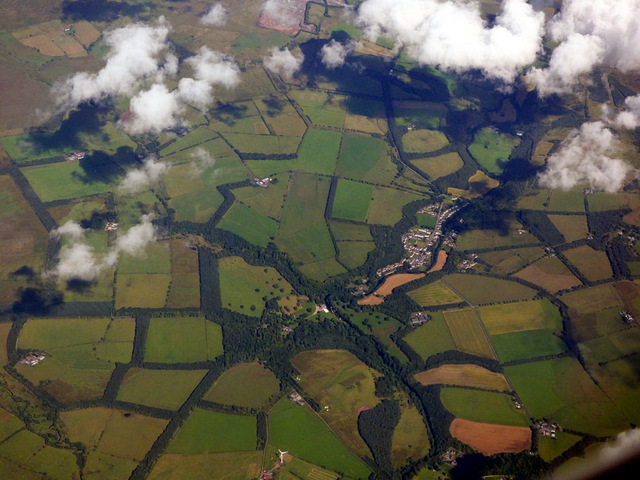
- Sorn from the air

- Location within East Ayrshire
- OS grid reference: NS548223
- Council area: East Ayrshire
- Lieutenancy area: Ayrshire
- Country: Scotland
- Sovereign state: United Kingdom
- Police: Scotland
- Fire: Scottish
- Ambulance: Scottish
- UK Parliament: Kilmarnock and Loudoun
- Scottish Parliament: Carrick, Cumnock and Doon Valley

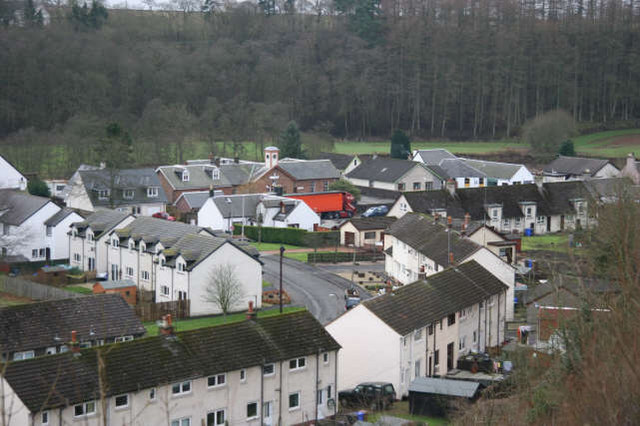
1950s council housing in Sorn; the brown building in the centre rear with the cream tower is the primary school

Sorn (Scottish Gaelic: Sorn, meaning a kiln) is a small village in East Ayrshire, Scotland. It is situated on the River Ayr. It has a population of roughly 350. Its neighbouring village is Catrine. Sorn Castle lies just outside the village.

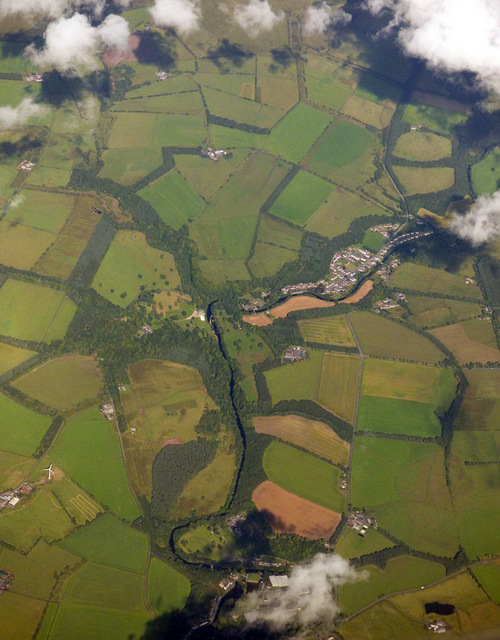
Catrine and Sorn from the air

== History ==
Sorn was a parish in Ayrshire. One gazetteer states "It is bounded on the north by Galston; on the east by Muirkirk; on the south by Auchinleck; and on the west by Mauchline." Another states that Sorn did not exist until 1658 when it was disjoined from the parish of Mauchline.

Sorn has a Covenanter history.

== Sorn today ==
Local businesses and services include: a cafe, a gift shop, a church, a village hall, a bowling green and a primary school. In November 2007 the school was threatened with closure by East Ayrshire Council. Previously, the village has supported an inn with a public bar, a hotel, a general store, a motorbike shop and a television shop.

Sorn is known for its success in the Britain in Bloom competition. In 2004 it won gold in the "Small Villages" category and has previously won, amongst other awards, the "Highly Commended Certificate" a number of times in the 1980s.

Sorn is situated on the River Ayr Way which opened in 2006 as Scotland's first source to sea long-distance path.

== Notable people born in Sorn ==
- John Campbell of Sorn nonconformist minister.
- Rev Lewis Balfour (1777–1860), minister of Sorn 1806 to 1824.
- George William Balfour (1823–1903), physician
- Alexander Peden (1626-1686) - preacher
- Sir John Rankine FRSE (1846–1922) - legal author
- Very Rev John Rankine (1816–1885), minister and Moderator of the General Assembly in 1883 (father of above)
- James Rennie (1787-1867) - natural historian, author, and educator
- James Seaton 1822-1882), Member of New Zealand's Parliament (1875-1879 and 1881–1882)

== See also ==
- Lady's Well, Auchmannoch
