= Kilmarnock and Loudoun =

Kilmarnock and Loudoun may refer to:

- Kilmarnock and Loudoun (district), a defunct local government district in Scotland
- Kilmarnock and Loudoun (Scottish Parliament constituency)
- Kilmarnock and Loudoun (UK Parliament constituency)
