= 1980 Kilmarnock and Loudoun District Council election =

Kilmarnock and Loudoun District Council election

← 1977	1 May 1980	1984 →

All 16 seats to Kilmarnock and Loudoun District Council 9 seats needed for a majority
- Registered: 61,563
- Turnout: 48.6%
	First party	Second party
	Lab	Con
Leader	John Anderson	Alan MacDougal
Party	Labour	Conservative
Leader's seat	Ward 8 (defeated)	Ward 13
Last election	7 seats, 38.6%	7 seats, 32.2%
Seats won	11	5
Seat change	▲4	▼2
Popular vote	16,882	7,639
Percentage	56.5%	25.6%
Swing	▲19.9	▼6.6
Council Leader before election
Conservative
Council Leader after election
Labour

Elections to Kilmarnock and Loudoun District Council were held on 1 May 1980, on the same day as the other Scottish local government elections. This was the third election to the district council following the local government reforms in the 1970s.

The election was the last to use the original 16 wards created by the Formation Electoral Arrangements in 1974. Each ward elected one councillor using first-past-the-post voting. Following the Initial Statutory Reviews of Electoral Arrangements in 1981, several wards were changed or abolished and the number of wards was increased.

Labour gained overall control of the district council after winning 11 of the 16 seats as the party increased their vote share by nearly 20% and took more than half of the popular vote. The previous election in 1977 had resulted in no overall control after Labour and the Conservatives were tied with seven seats each. The Conservatives were the second-largest party after they retained five of their seven seats. The Scottish National Party (SNP), who had won two seats in 1977, lost both of their seats.

== Background ==
Supported by the two SNP councillors, the Conservatives had run Kilmarnock and Loudon as a minority since the previous election in 1977 while, at Westminster, the party had taken over from Labour following the 1979 general election.

Ahead of the 1980 election, the Conservatives campaigned to continue on with their "winning team". Their manifesto was entitled "Passport to Prosperity" and highlighted their support for the Right to Buy policy, a pledge to build new swimming baths and their support for small businesses at the newly established industrial estate in Bonnyton.

Labour's campaign focused on the Thatcher government at Westminster which was unpopular in Scotland with their election literature headed "Tory Rule Not OK". They pledged to modernise the council's housing stock, provide leisure facilities for the whole family and introduce a more creative job opportunity scheme in response to raising unemployment.

The SNP campaigned on a perceived "criminal" wasting of money within local government claiming that while rents and rates had increased dramatically since the local government reforms in 1974, ratepayers were instead funding "pleasure trips" for councillors in relation to town twinning.

== Results ==
1980 Kilmarnock and Loudoun District Council election result
Party	Seats	Gains	Losses	Net gain/loss	Seats %	Votes %	Votes	+/−
Labour	11	4	0	▲4	68.8	56.5	16,882	▲19.9
Conservative	5	0	2	▼2	31.2	25.6	7,639	▼6.6
SNP	0	0	2	▼2	0.0	16.1	4,797	▼9.7
Liberal	0	0	0	Steady	0.0	1.9	559	▼0.5
Total	16						29,877	

== Ward results ==
=== Ward 1 ===
Ward 1
Party	Candidate	Votes	%	±%
Labour	Houston Sim	1,238	50.4	▲14.5
SNP	Robert Brown	1,207	49.2	▲3.9
Majority		31	1.2	N/A
Turnout		2,445	52.8	▼1.7
Registered electors		4,654		
Labour gain from SNP		Swing	▲5.3	

=== Ward 2 ===
Ward 2
Party	Candidate	Votes	%	±%
Labour	Robert Creighton	1,226	70.4	▲9.7
SNP	Patricia Gibson	284	16.3	New
Liberal	Peter Kerr	226	13.0	▼26.3
Majority		942	54.1	▲32.7
Turnout		1,736	47.5	▲4.8
Registered electors		3,662		
Labour hold		Swing	▲18.0	

=== Ward 3 ===
Ward 3
Party	Candidate	Votes	%	±%
Labour	John Hunter	1,166	79.3	▲34.4
Conservative	Elizabeth Walker	303	20.6	▼0.2
Majority		863	58.7	▲48.1
Turnout		1,469	38.1	▼10.7
Registered electors		3,858		
Labour hold		Swing	▲34.3	

=== Ward 4 ===
Ward 4
Party	Candidate	Votes	%	±%
Labour	Angus Steele	838	43.6	▲20.0
Conservative	Robert Ledgerwood	751	39.1	▲1.0
Liberal	Anne Dick	333	17.3	▲12.0
Majority		87	4.5	N/A
Turnout		1,922	45.7	▼6.0
Registered electors		4,207		
Labour gain from Conservative		Swing	▲9.5	

=== Ward 5 ===
Ward 5
Party	Candidate	Votes	%	±%
Labour	John McCrae	1,372	71.0	▲18.9
SNP	Charles Calman	556	28.8	▼19.1
Majority		816	42.2	▲38.0
Turnout		1,928	48.9	▼2.7
Registered electors		3,950		
Labour hold		Swing	▲19.0	

=== Ward 6 ===
Ward 6
Party	Candidate	Votes	%	±%
Conservative	Margaret Parker	1,121	61.1	▲4.6
Labour	William McCulloch	713	38.8	▲20.1
Majority		408	22.3	▼9.4
Turnout		1,834	55.1	▼6.9
Registered electors		3,333		
Conservative hold		Swing	▼7.7	

=== Ward 7 ===
Ward 7
Party	Candidate	Votes	%	±%
Labour	James O'Neil	1,280	56.6	▲28.6
Conservative	John Porter	976	43.2	▲7.3
Majority		304	13.4	N/A
Turnout		2,256	53.1	▼4.9
Registered electors		4,259		
Labour gain from Conservative		Swing	▲10.6	

=== Ward 8 ===
Ward 8
Party	Candidate	Votes	%	±%
Conservative	Mary Porter	1,173	70.1	▼10.8
Labour	John Anderson	497	29.7	▲10.6
Majority		676	40.4	▼21.4
Turnout		1,670	46.4	▼2.3
Registered electors		3,602		
Conservative hold		Swing	▼10.7	

=== Ward 9 ===
Ward 9
Party	Candidate	Votes	%	±%
Labour	Maisie Garven	1,449	78.4	▲36.7
SNP	Gordon Gibson	393	21.3	▼19.7
Majority		1,056	57.1	▲56.4
Turnout		1,842	44.0	▼6.8
Registered electors		4,207		
Labour hold		Swing	▲28.2	

=== Ward 10 ===
Ward 10
Party	Candidate	Votes	%	±%
Labour	Thomas Ferguson	1,274	59.7	▲20.3
SNP	Leslie Flannigan	854	40.0	▼3.8
Majority		420	19.7	N/A
Turnout		2,128	47.4	▼0.7
Registered electors		4,503		
Labour gain from SNP		Swing	▲12.0	

=== Ward 11 ===
Ward 11
Party	Candidate	Votes	%	±%
Conservative	James Thomson	750	70.1	▼15.6
Labour	John Wilson	314	29.3	▲15.0
Majority		436	40.8	▼30.6
Turnout		1,064	37.7	▼15.2
Registered electors		2,836		
Conservative hold		Swing	▼15.3	

=== Ward 12 ===
Ward 12
Party	Candidate	Votes	%	±%
Labour	Andrew Nisbet	1,610	86.5	▲10.4
Conservative	James Mundell	245	13.2	▼10.7
Majority		1,365	73.3	▲21.1
Turnout		1,855	45.4	▲4.7
Registered electors		4,096		
Labour hold		Swing	▲10.5	

=== Ward 13 ===
Ward 13
Party	Candidate	Votes	%	±%
Conservative	Alan MacDougall	833	33.9	▼1.3
Labour	Annie Lochhead	818	33.3	▲6.4
SNP	William Lamond	801	32.6	▼0.5
Majority		15	0.6	▼1.5
Turnout		2,452	54.1	▼9.5
Registered electors		4,536		
Conservative hold		Swing	▼3.8	

=== Ward 14 ===
Ward 14
Party	Candidate	Votes	%	±%
Labour	James Mills	1,551	75.5	▲11.4
Conservative	Archibald Wight	339	16.5	▼19.4
SNP	James Morrison	162	7.9	New
Majority		1,212	59.0	▲30.8
Turnout		2,052	47.4	▲7.3
Registered electors		4,331		
Labour hold		Swing	▲15.4	

=== Ward 15 ===
Ward 15
Party	Candidate	Votes	%	±%
Conservative	Trevor Whale	755	45.5	▲9.1
Labour	James McChristie	598	36.0	▲3.2
SNP	James Mair	306	18.4	▼12.4
Majority		157	9.5	▲5.9
Turnout		1,659	56.7	▲0.8
Registered electors		2,928		
Conservative hold		Swing	▲2.9	

=== Ward 16 ===
Ward 16
Party	Candidate	Votes	%	±%
Labour	James Anderson	938	59.9	▲0.4
Conservative	James Barclay-Gall	393	25.1	▼15.4
SNP	Alexander Young	234	14.9	New
Majority		545	34.8	▲15.8
Turnout		1,565	60.2	▲8.6
Registered electors		2,601		
Labour hold		Swing	▲7.9	

== Aftermath ==
Labour regained control of the district council from the minority Conservative administration which had been in power since the previous election in 1977. Cllr Andrew Nisbet was elected as Provost following the first meeting of the new council.

The result reflected a "strong anti-Tory trend" across Scotland according to Conservative group leader Cllr Alan MacDougal while former SNP councillor Leslie Flannigan blamed the Thatcher government for the party's losses as they were caught "in the middle of a shift from Tory to Labour".

=== By-elections ===
==== Ward 9 ====
Ward 9 Labour councillor Maisie Garven died on 16 November 1980 and a by-election, held on 12 February 1981, was won by Labour's Robert Stirling.

Ward 9 by-election, 12 February 1981
Party	Candidate	Votes	%	±%
Labour	Robert Stirling	1,269	71.9	▼6.5
SNP	Charles Calman	351	19.9	▼1.4
Conservative	Elizabeth Walker	110	6.2	New
Scottish Movement Progressive Party	Gordon Walker	36	2.0	New
Majority		918	52.0	▼5.1
Turnout		1,766	42.0	▼2.0
Registered electors		4,204		
Labour hold		Swing	▼2.5	

==== Ward 2 ====
Labour group leader and Ward 2 councillor Robert Creighton died suddenly on 18 August 1982 and a by-election, held on 11 November, was won by Labour's James Campbell.

Ward 2 by-election, 11 November 1982
Party	Candidate	Votes	%	±%
Labour	James Campbell	792	63.2	▼7.2
SNP	Danny Coffey	460	36.7	▲20.4
Majority		332	26.5	▼27.6
Turnout		1,254	35.1	▼12.4
Registered electors		3,584		
Labour hold		Swing	▼13.8	
