= Willie Coffey =

Scottish National Party politician

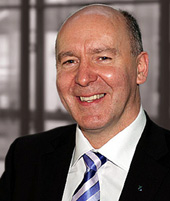
- Official portrait, 2012

Member of the Scottish Parliament for Kilmarnock and Irvine Valley Kilmarnock and Loudoun (2007–11)
- In office 3 May 2007 – 9 April 2026
- Preceded by: Margaret Jamieson
- Succeeded by: Alan Brown

Personal details
- Born: 24 May 1958 (age 68) Ayrshire, Scotland
- Party: Scottish National Party

William Lynch Coffey (born 24 May 1958) is a Scottish National Party (SNP) politician. He has served as the Member of the Scottish Parliament (MSP) for Kilmarnock and Irvine Valley from 2011 to 2026, and previously Kilmarnock and Loudoun from 2007 to 2011, before boundary changes.

Coffey studied at the University of Strathclyde where he obtained a degree in Computer Science. He subsequently worked as Software Development Manager and latterly as a Quality and Risk Manager with Learning and Teaching Scotland before his election to the Scottish Parliament. He has been a councillor on East Ayrshire Council.

== East Ayrshire Council (1992–2007) ==
He was first elected to Kilmarnock and Loudoun District Council in 1992 and subsequently to East Ayrshire Council (covering the Onthank ward in northern Kilmarnock) in 1999, 2003 and 2007 before retiring from local government at the 2012 Local Elections.

He is the brother of former Provost and Cllr. Danny Coffey who came within 1,210 votes of winning the Kilmarnock and Loudoun Holyrood constituency in 2003 and died on 26 February 2006. Their sister Helen held Danny's Altonhill, Hillhead & Longpark council ward in a by-election with an increased majority and a 5.6% swing from Labour, before both she and Willie were elected to the new multi-member Kilmarnock North ward in 2007.

== Scottish Parliament (2007–2026) ==
Coffey won the Kilmarnock and Loudoun seat for the SNP in May 2007 with a vote of 14,297 and a majority of 1,342. He serves on the Scottish Parliament's Audit Committee and has campaigned on numerous occasions to protect the Scotch whisky industry, particularly in his own area.

In 2017 Coffey was reported to Holyrood authorities for "inappropriate language" and "unsolicited attention" by a female civil servant. Coffey denied the allegation and stated that he did not recognise the claims about his behaviour.

In April 2022, Coffey was an object of ridicule after he was asked to open a debate which he expected to close, and failed to amend his speech accordingly: as a result, he stated that he would be "reflecting on the contributions to this debate", when in fact no one had spoken. He was told to sit down by the Presiding Officer.

In March 2025, he announced he would not seek re-election at the 2026 Scottish Parliament election.

=== Committees ===
During his tenure as an MSP, Coffey has been a member of the following committees:

- Public Audit and Postlegislative Scrutiny Committee (30 March 2017 – 3 December 2020)
- Economy Energy and Fair Work Committee (3 September 2019 – 10 September 2019)
- Economy Energy and Fair Work Committee (6 September 2018 – 3 September 2019)
- Finance and Constitution Committee (29 September 2016 – 3 September 2019)
- Economy Jobs and Fair Work Committee (24 May 2018 – 6 September 2018)
- Equalities and Human Rights Committee (29 September 2016 – 30 March 2017)
- Equal Opportunities Committee (8 June 2016 – 29 September 2016)
- Finance Committee (8 June 2016 – 29 September 2016)
- European and External Relations Committee (18 September 2012 – 23 March 2016)
- Local Government and Regeneration Committee (27 November 2014 – 23 March 2016)
- Public Audit Committee (1 June 2011 – 27 November 2014)
- Public Audit Committee (11 December 2008 – 22 March 2011)
- Equal Opportunities Committee (26 February 2009 – 20 May 2010)
- Equal Opportunities Committee (26 June 2008 – 26 February 2009)
- Audit Committee (13 June 2007 – 10 December 2008)

== See also ==
- Politics of Scotland
- Kilmarnock

Scottish Parliament
Preceded by Margaret Jamieson	Member of the Scottish Parliament for Kilmarnock and Loudoun; 2007–2011	Constituency abolished
New constituency	Member of the Scottish Parliament for Kilmarnock and Irvine Valley; 2011–2026	Incumbent
