= 1992 Kilmarnock and Loudoun District Council election =

Kilmarnock and Loudoun District Council election

← 1988	7 May 1992

All 18 seats to Kilmarnock and Loudoun District Council 10 seats needed for a majority
- Registered: 62,135
- Turnout: 45.4%
	First party	Second party	Third party
	Lab	SNP	Con
Party	Labour	SNP	Conservative
Last election	12 seats, 48.3%	3 seats, 36.1%	3 seats, 18.8%
Seats won	8	7	3
Seat change	▼4	▲4	Steady
Popular vote	10,687	11,250	6,112
Percentage	38.0%	40.0%	12.6%
Swing	▼10.3	▲3.9	▼6.2
- Result of the election
Council Leader before election
Labour
Council Leader after election
Labour

Elections to Kilmarnock and Loudoun District Council were held on 7 May 1992, on the same day as the other Scottish local government elections. This was the final election to the district council which was abolished in 1995 along with Cumnock and Doon Valley District Council and was replaced by East Ayrshire Council following the implementation of the Local Government etc. (Scotland) Act 1994. The regional council, Strathclyde was also abolished and the new unitary authority took on its responsibilities.

The election was also the last to use the 18 wards created by the Initial Statutory Reviews of Electoral Arrangements in 1981 without alterations. Each ward elected one councillor using first-past-the-post voting.

Despite coming second in the popular vote, Labour remained the largest party on the district council after winning eight seats, however, they no longer had an overall majority after losing four seats. The Scottish National Party (SNP) won the popular vote and gained four seats but that wasn't enough to overtake Labour. As a result, they became the second-largest party on the council with seven seats. The Conservatives' vote share fell by 6.2% but they remained on three seats.

== Results ==
1992 Kilmarnock and Loudoun District Council election result
Party	Seats	Gains	Losses	Net gain/loss	Seats %	Votes %	Votes	+/−
Labour	8	1	5	▼4	44.4	38.0	10,687	▼10.3
SNP	7	5	1	▲4	38.9	40.0	11,250	▲3.9
Conservative	3	0	0	Steady	16.7	27.1	6,112	▼6.2
Liberal Democrats	0	0	0	Steady	0.0	0.5	137	New
Total	18						28,186	

== Ward results ==
=== Ward 1 ===
Ward 1
Party	Candidate	Votes	%	±%
Labour	W. Doyle	596	45.3	▼7.9
SNP	D. Rees	594	45.1	▲5.3
Conservative	D. Scott	127	9.6	▲2.7
Majority		2	0.2	▼13.2
Turnout		1,317	47.2	▼8.1
Registered electors		2,793		
Labour hold		Swing	▼6.6	

=== Ward 2 ===
Ward 2
Party	Candidate	Votes	%	±%
SNP	K. Nicol	698	45.7	▲7.7
Labour	W. Denim	566	37.1	▼8.3
Conservative	J. Henderson	260	17.0	▲3.4
Majority		132	8.6	N/A
Turnout		1,524	43.6	▼7.6
Registered electors		3,502		
SNP gain from Labour		Swing	▲8.0	

=== Ward 3 ===
Ward 3
Party	Candidate	Votes	%	±%
SNP	W. Coffey	801	49.9	▲10.7
Labour	J. Knapp	766	47.7	▼10.5
Conservative	A. Park	39	2.4	▼0.2
Majority		35	2.2	N/A
Turnout		1,606	57.2	▼8.0
Registered electors		2,809		
SNP gain from Labour		Swing	▲10.6	

=== Ward 4 ===
Ward 4
Party	Candidate	Votes	%	±%
SNP	D. Coffey	612	43.5	▲7.2
Conservative	J. Porter	462	32.9	▲0.7
Labour	R. Russell	265	18.8	▼12.5
Liberal Democrats	T. Curran	67	4.8	New
Majority		150	10.6	▲6.5
Turnout		1,406	44.5	▼5.9
Registered electors		3,159		
SNP hold		Swing	▲3.2	

=== Ward 5 ===
Ward 5
Party	Candidate	Votes	%	±%
Labour	W. Cree	665	41.9	▼6.2
SNP	C. Calman	630	39.7	▲8.1
Conservative	B. Rubin	292	18.4	▼1.8
Majority		35	2.2	▼14.3
Turnout		1,587	42.9	▼5.7
Registered electors		3,698		
Labour hold		Swing	▼7.1	

=== Ward 6 ===
Ward 6
Party	Candidate	Votes	%	±%
Labour	A. McIntyre	680	47.2	▼12.7
SNP	R. Armour	662	45.9	▲11.8
Conservative	S. Strachan	99	6.9	▲0.9
Majority		18	1.3	▼24.5
Turnout		1,441	42.3	▼11.3
Registered electors		3,409		
Labour hold		Swing	▼12.2	

=== Ward 7 ===
Ward 7
Party	Candidate	Votes	%	±%
SNP	D. Reid	830	46.1	▲25.7
Labour	T. Kitchin	650	36.1	▼25.2
Conservative	T. Donald	321	17.8	▼0.4
Majority		180	10.0	N/A
Turnout		1,801	47.7	▼10.0
Registered electors		3,798		
SNP gain from Labour		Swing	▲25.4	

=== Ward 8 ===
Ward 8
Party	Candidate	Votes	%	±%
Conservative	M. Porter	1,134	63.9	▲1.3
SNP	A. Ingram	396	22.3	▲7.3
Labour	C. Rutherford	246	13.9	▼1.2
Majority		738	41.6	▼5.9
Turnout		1,776	43.7	▼2.1
Registered electors		4,066		
Conservative hold		Swing	▼3.0	

=== Ward 9 ===
Ward 9
Party	Candidate	Votes	%	±%
SNP	N. Gee	804	49.4	▲12.0
Labour	A. Walsh	483	29.7	▼5.8
Conservative	J. Reid	341	20.9	▼2.1
Majority		321	19.7	▲17.8
Turnout		1,628	50.4	▼6.2
Registered electors		3,231		
SNP hold		Swing	▲8.9	

=== Ward 10 ===
Ward 10
Party	Candidate	Votes	%	±%
SNP	A. Campbell	580	44.4	▲7.3
Labour	W. Lindsay	547	41.9	▼8.6
Conservative	J. Howard	178	13.6	▲1.3
Majority		33	2.5	N/A
Turnout		1,305	40.1	▼5.5
Registered electors		3,260		
SNP gain from Labour		Swing	▲7.9	

=== Ward 11 ===
Ward 11
Party	Candidate	Votes	%	±%
Labour	R. Stirling	869	57.0	▼4.3
SNP	S. McCluskey	550	36.1	▲3.1
Conservative	C. Little	106	7.0	▲1.3
Majority		319	20.9	▼7.4
Turnout		1,525	51.2	▼6.3
Registered electors		2,980		
Labour hold		Swing	▼3.7	

=== Ward 12 ===
Ward 12
Party	Candidate	Votes	%	±%
Labour	I. George	604	46.8	▲6.3
SNP	J. Todd	560	43.4	▼9.4
Liberal Democrats	A. Stevenson	70	5.4	New
Conservative	E. King	57	4.4	▲0.3
Majority		44	3.4	N/A
Turnout		1,291	45.4	▼10.9
Registered electors		2,845		
Labour gain from SNP		Swing	▲7.8	

=== Ward 13 ===
Ward 13
Party	Candidate	Votes	%	±%
Conservative	J. Thomson	886	53.8	▲8.6
SNP	K. Hall	401	24.4	▲5.2
Labour	A. Martin	357	21.7	▼5.4
Majority		485	29.4	▲13.3
Turnout		1,644	43.1	▼1.9
Registered electors		3,823		
Conservative hold		Swing	▲1.7	

=== Ward 14 ===
Ward 14
Party	Candidate	Votes	%	±%
Conservative	A. MacDougall	879	49.0	▲11.9
SNP	G. Duncan	474	26.4	▼2.9
Labour	F. Boulton	440	24.5	▼8.9
Majority		405	22.6	▲18.9
Turnout		1,793	47.0	▼9.1
Registered electors		3,815		
Conservative hold		Swing	▲7.4	

=== Ward 15 ===
Ward 15
Party	Candidate	Votes	%	±%
Labour	A. Nisbet	823	54.0	▼4.3
SNP	J. Taylor	538	35.3	▲1.2
Conservative	A. McCall	160	10.5	▲3.1
Majority		285	18.7	▼5.4
Turnout		1,521	42.1	▼9.8
Registered electors		3,618		
Labour hold		Swing	▼2.7	

=== Ward 16 ===
Ward 16
Party	Candidate	Votes	%	±%
Labour	J. Raymond	662	44.4	▼15.2
SNP	W. Loudon	644	43.2	▲11.6
Conservative	R. Humphreys	183	12.3	▲3.5
Majority		18	1.2	▼26.8
Turnout		1,489	40.7	▼10.1
Registered electors		3,662		
Labour hold		Swing	▼13.4	

=== Ward 17 ===
Ward 17
Party	Candidate	Votes	%	±%
Labour	G. Turnbull	899	48.8	▼15.1
SNP	M. Young	606	32.9	▲13.6
Conservative	L. Freeman	338	18.3	▲1.6
Majority		293	15.9	▼28.7
Turnout		1,843	46.6	▼4.5
Registered electors		3,957		
Labour hold		Swing	▼14.3	

=== Ward 18 ===
Ward 18
Party	Candidate	Votes	%	±%
SNP	R. McDill	870	51.4	▲24.3
Labour	J. Anderson	569	33.6	▼23.0
Conservative	F. McLean	250	14.8	▼1.1
Majority		301	17.8	N/A
Turnout		1,689	45.6	▲1.1
Registered electors		3,710		
SNP gain from Labour		Swing	▲23.6	
