= 1974 Kilmarnock and Loudoun District Council election =

Kilmarnock and Loudoun District Council election

7 May 1974	1977 →

All 16 seats to Kilmarnock and Loudoun District Council 9 seats needed for a majority
- Registered: 60,643
- Turnout: 49.5%
	First party	Second party
	Lab	Con
Party	Labour	Conservative
Seats won	12	4
Popular vote	16,505	9,266
Percentage	54.9%	30.8%
Council Leader after election
Labour

Elections to Kilmarnock and Loudoun District Council were held on 7 May 1974, on the same day as the other Scottish local government elections. This was the first election to the district council following the implementation of the Local Government (Scotland) Act 1973.

The election used the 16 wards created by the Formation Electoral Arrangements in 1974. Each ward elected one councillor using first-past-the-post voting.

Labour took control of the council after winning a large majority. The party took 12 of the 16 seats and more than 50% of the popular vote. The other four seats were won by the Conservatives.

== Background ==
Prior to 1974, the area that was to become Kilmarnock and Loudoun, included five of the 17 burghs within the County of Ayr. The four small burghs (Darvel, Galston, Newmilns and Greenholm and Stewarton) had limited powers which included some control over planning as well as local taxation, building control, housing, lighting and drainage. The large burgh of Kilmarnock had further powers over the police, public health, social services, registration of births, marriages and deaths and electoral registration. The rest of the local government responsibility fell to the county council which had full control over the areas which were not within a burgh.

Following the recommendations in the Wheatly Report, the old system of counties and burghs – which had resulted in a mishmash of local government areas in which some small burghs had larger populations but far fewer responsibilities than some large burghs and even counties – was to be replaced by a new system of regional and district councils. The five burghs as well as the surrounding areas were placed in Kilmarnock and Loudoun District within the Strathclyde region.

== Results ==
1974 Kilmarnock and Loudoun District Council election result
Party	Seats	Gains	Losses	Net gain/loss	Seats %	Votes %	Votes	+/−
Labour	12			N/A	75.0	54.9	16,505	N/A
Conservative	4			N/A	25.0	30.8	9,266	N/A
Liberal	0			N/A	0.0	13.6	4,090	N/A
Independent Labour	0			N/A	0.0	0.6	183	N/A
Total	16						30,044	

== Ward results ==
=== Ward 1 ===
Ward 1
Party	Candidate	Votes	%
Labour	J. Raphael	1,363	68.2
Conservative	J. Corbett	637	31.9
Majority		726	36.3
Turnout		2,000	45.5
Registered electors		4,431	
Labour win (new seat)			

=== Ward 2 ===
Ward 2
Party	Candidate	Votes	%
Labour	R. Creighton	1,160	60.6
Liberal	P. McMillan	458	23.9
Conservative	T. Callaghan	296	15.5
Majority		702	36.7
Turnout		1,914	49.4
Registered electors		3,902	
Labour win (new seat)			

=== Ward 3 ===
Ward 3
Party	Candidate	Votes	%
Labour	J. Hunter	1,403	73.8
Conservative	A. Hughes	498	26.2
Majority		905	47.6
Turnout		1,901	43.0
Registered electors		4,474	
Labour win (new seat)			

=== Ward 4 ===
Ward 4
Party	Candidate	Votes	%
Conservative	R. Ledgerwood	773	41.9
Labour	H. Mitchell	565	30.6
Liberal	O. Dunlop	326	17.7
Independent Labour	B. Mitchell	183	9.9
Majority		208	11.3
Turnout		1,847	45.5
Registered electors		4,099	
Conservative win (new seat)			

=== Ward 5 ===
Ward 5
Party	Candidate	Votes	%
Labour	J. Anderson	1,341	78.0
Conservative	K. Hughes	223	13.0
Liberal	B. Ellerd-Elliot	155	9.0
Majority		1,118	65.0
Turnout		1,719	46.7
Registered electors		3,710	
Labour win (new seat)			

=== Ward 6 ===
Ward 6
Party	Candidate	Votes	%
Conservative	M. Parker	1,070	56.9
Labour	J. Hollywood	617	32.8
Liberal	D. Young	193	10.3
Majority		453	24.1
Turnout		1,880	57.3
Registered electors		3,331	
Conservative win (new seat)			

=== Ward 7 ===
Ward 7
Party	Candidate	Votes	%
Labour	A. Mackie	962	46.8
Conservative	J. Porter	904	44.0
Liberal	P. Hayman	188	9.1
Majority		58	2.8
Turnout		2,054	56.9
Registered electors		3,633	
Labour win (new seat)			

=== Ward 8 ===
Ward 8
Party	Candidate	Votes	%
Conservative	M. Porter	1,392	66.3
Labour	W. Maxwell	415	19.8
Liberal	R. O'Hagan	293	14.0
Majority		977	46.5
Turnout		2,100	55.7
Registered electors		3,799	
Conservative win (new seat)			

=== Ward 9 ===
Ward 9
Party	Candidate	Votes	%
Labour	M. Garven	1,258	68.1
Conservative	A. McCluskey	343	18.6
Liberal	A. Brown	247	13.4
Majority		915	49.5
Turnout		1,848	45.2
Registered electors		4,116	
Labour win (new seat)			

=== Ward 10 ===
Ward 10
Party	Candidate	Votes	%
Labour	T. Ferguson	1,465	72.2
Conservative	C. McCambridge	320	15.8
Liberal	G. Gibson	245	12.1
Majority		1,145	56.4
Turnout		2,030	41.9
Registered electors		4,867	
Labour win (new seat)			

=== Ward 11 ===
Ward 11
Party	Candidate	Votes	%
Conservative	J. Thomson	862	57.2
Liberal	J. Carruthers	364	24.2
Labour	B. McGeechan	280	18.6
Majority		498	33.0
Turnout		1,506	54.5
Registered electors		2,789	
Conservative win (new seat)			

=== Ward 12 ===
Ward 12
Party	Candidate	Votes	%
Labour	A. Nisbet	1,541	80.9
Conservative	O. Cater	365	19.2
Majority		1,176	61.7
Turnout		1,906	48.3
Registered electors		3,993	
Labour win (new seat)			

=== Ward 13 ===
Ward 13
Party	Candidate	Votes	%
Labour	W. Aitken	1,025	46.3
Liberal	J. Brown	699	31.6
Conservative	R. Grant	488	22.1
Majority		326	14.7
Turnout		2,212	55.2
Registered electors		4,029	
Labour win (new seat)			

=== Ward 14 ===
Ward 14
Party	Candidate	Votes	%
Labour	A. Lundie	1,517	72.9
Conservative	P. Foote	391	18.8
Liberal	W. Powell	174	8.4
Majority		1,126	54.1
Turnout		2,082	52.9
Registered electors		3,977	
Labour win (new seat)			

=== Ward 15 ===
Ward 15
Party	Candidate	Votes	%
Labour	J. White	753	47.6
Conservative	E. Harrison	443	28.0
Liberal	T. Whale	385	24.4
Majority		310	19.6
Turnout		1,581	52.5
Registered electors		3,053	
Labour win (new seat)			

=== Ward 16 ===
Ward 16
Party	Candidate	Votes	%
Labour	J. Anderson	840	57.4
Liberal	R. Wilson	363	24.8
Conservative	T. Donald	261	17.8
Majority		477	32.6
Turnout		1,464	60.6
Registered electors		2,440	
Labour win (new seat)			
