= 1984 Kilmarnock and Loudoun District Council election =

Kilmarnock and Loudoun District Council election

| ← 1980 | 3 May 1984 | 1988 → |

All 18 seats to Kilmarnock and Loudoun District Council 10 seats needed for a majority
- Registered: 62,555
- Turnout: 43.6%
| | First party | Second party | Third party |
|---|---|---|---|
| | Lab | Con | SNP |
| Party | Labour | Conservative | SNP |
| Last election | 11 seats, 56.5% | 5 seats, 25.6% | 0 seats, 16.1% |
| Seats won | 14 | 3 | 1 |
| Seat change | ▲3 | ▼2 | ▲1 |
| Popular vote | 15,323 | 6,321 | 4,644 |
| Percentage | 56.2% | 36.1% | 18.2% |
| Swing | ▼0.3 | ▲10.5 | ▲2.1 |
Council Leader before election
Labour
Council Leader after election
Labour

Elections to Kilmarnock and Loudoun District Council were held on 3 May 1984, on the same day as the other Scottish local government elections. This was the fourth election to the district council following the local government reforms in the 1970s.

The election was the first to use the 18 wards created by the Initial Statutory Reviews of Electoral Arrangements in 1981 – two more than the previous election. Each ward elected one councillor using first-past-the-post voting.

Labour maintained a large majority on the district council after winning 14 of the 18 seats, three more than the party had won at the previous election in 1980. Despite increasing their vote share by more than 10%, the Conservatives only won three seats, two fewer than four years previous. The final seat was won by the Scottish National Party (SNP).

== Results ==
1984 Kilmarnock and Loudoun District Council election result
| Party | Seats | Gains | Losses | Net gain/loss | Seats % | Votes % | Votes | +/− |
|---|---|---|---|---|---|---|---|---|
| Labour | 14 | | | ▲3 | 77.7 | 56.2 | 15,323 | ▼0.3 |
| Conservative | 3 | | | ▼2 | 16.7 | 36.1 | 6,321 | ▲10.5 |
| SNP | 1 | | | ▲1 | 5.6 | 18.2 | 4,644 | ▲2.1 |
| Liberal | 0 | | | Steady | 0.0 | 1.8 | 501 | ▼0.1 |
| SDP | 0 | | | Steady | 0.0 | 0.9 | 254 | New |
| Independent Labour | 0 | | | Steady | 0.0 | 0.5 | 156 | New |
| Total | 18 | | | | | | 27,199 | |

== Ward results ==
=== Ward 1 ===
Ward 1
| Party | Candidate | Votes | % |
|---|---|---|---|
| SNP | R. Brown | 927 | 64.7 |
| Labour | J. Knapp | 500 | 34.9 |
| Majority | | 427 | 29.8 |
| Turnout | | 1,427 | 51.1 |
| Registered electors | | 2,804 | |
| SNP win (new seat) | | | |

=== Ward 2 ===
Ward 1 was renamed Ward 2 following the Initial Statutory Reviews of Electoral Arrangements.

Ward 2
| Party | Candidate | Votes | % | ±% |
|---|---|---|---|---|
| Labour | I. McAlpine | 864 | 57.6 | ▲7.2 |
| SNP | C. Calman | 389 | 25.9 | ▼23.3 |
| Conservative | G. Woodford | 245 | 16.3 | New |
| Majority | | 475 | 21.7 | ▲20.5 |
| Turnout | | 1,498 | 46.0 | ▼6.8 |
| Registered electors | | 3,258 | | |
| Labour hold | | Swing | ▲15.2 | |

=== Ward 3 ===
Ward 3
| Party | Candidate | Votes | % |
|---|---|---|---|
| Labour | J. Campbell | 748 | 50.3 |
| SNP | D. Coffey | 621 | 41.7 |
| Liberal | P. Kerr | 116 | 7.8 |
| Majority | | 127 | 8.6 |
| Turnout | | 1,485 | 46.9 |
| Registered electors | | 3,172 | |
| Labour win (new seat) | | | |

=== Ward 4 ===
Ward 4
| Party | Candidate | Votes | % |
|---|---|---|---|
| Conservative | A. Parker | 575 | 45.3 |
| Labour | G. Keegan | 537 | 42.4 |
| SNP | A. McCredie | 152 | 12.0 |
| Majority | | 38 | 2.9 |
| Turnout | | 1,264 | 39.7 |
| Registered electors | | 3,197 | |
| Conservative win (new seat) | | | |

=== Ward 5 ===
Ward 5
| Party | Candidate | Votes | % |
|---|---|---|---|
| Labour | A. Steele | 922 | 56.4 |
| Conservative | H. Burnett | 470 | 28.7 |
| SNP | A. Wallace | 241 | 14.7 |
| Majority | | 452 | 27.7 |
| Turnout | | 1,633 | 43.9 |
| Registered electors | | 3,723 | |
| Labour win (new seat) | | | |

=== Ward 6 ===
Ward 6
| Party | Candidate | Votes | % |
|---|---|---|---|
| Labour | J. McCrae | 1,268 | 79.4 |
| SNP | E. Boyle | 195 | 12.2 |
| Conservative | A. McCluskey | 132 | 8.3 |
| Majority | | 1,073 | 67.2 |
| Turnout | | 1,595 | 45.1 |
| Registered electors | | 3,535 | |
| Labour win (new seat) | | | |

=== Ward 7 ===
Ward 7
| Party | Candidate | Votes | % |
|---|---|---|---|
| Labour | J. Buchanan | 982 | 53.5 |
| Conservative | M. Parker | 722 | 39.3 |
| SNP | A. Calman | 127 | 6.9 |
| Majority | | 260 | 14.2 |
| Turnout | | 1,831 | 50.4 |
| Registered electors | | 3,640 | |
| Labour win (new seat) | | | |

=== Ward 8 ===
Ward 8
| Party | Candidate | Votes | % |
|---|---|---|---|
| Conservative | M. Porter | 1,087 | 66.4 |
| Liberal | R. Richardson | 244 | 14.9 |
| Labour | R. McCrae | 203 | 12.4 |
| SNP | G. Ingram | 98 | 6.0 |
| Majority | | 843 | 51.5 |
| Turnout | | 1,632 | 45.0 |
| Registered electors | | 3,636 | |
| Conservative win (new seat) | | | |

=== Ward 9 ===
Ward 9
| Party | Candidate | Votes | % |
|---|---|---|---|
| Labour | J. O'Neil | 743 | 48.1 |
| Conservative | J. Porter | 583 | 37.8 |
| SNP | N. Gee | 217 | 14.1 |
| Majority | | 160 | 10.3 |
| Turnout | | 1,543 | 47.4 |
| Registered electors | | 3,260 | |
| Labour win (new seat) | | | |

=== Ward 10 ===
Ward 10
| Party | Candidate | Votes | % |
|---|---|---|---|
| Labour | J. Blaney | 854 | 62.9 |
| Conservative | J. Howard | 268 | 19.7 |
| SNP | A. Ingram | 233 | 17.2 |
| Majority | | 586 | 43.2 |
| Turnout | | 1,355 | 39.9 |
| Registered electors | | 3,400 | |
| Labour win (new seat) | | | |

=== Ward 11 ===
Ward 11
| Party | Candidate | Votes | % |
|---|---|---|---|
| Labour | R. Stiring | 1,206 | 86.8 |
| SNP | J. Miller | 177 | 12.7 |
| Majority | | 1,029 | 74.1 |
| Turnout | | 1,383 | 42.8 |
| Registered electors | | 3,243 | |
| Labour win (new seat) | | | |

=== Ward 12 ===
Ward 12
| Party | Candidate | Votes | % |
|---|---|---|---|
| Labour | T. Ferguson | 1,016 | 66.8 |
| SNP | P. Gibson | 359 | 23.6 |
| Liberal | W. George | 141 | 9.3 |
| Majority | | 657 | 43.2 |
| Turnout | | 1,516 | 42.0 |
| Registered electors | | 3,615 | |
| Labour win (new seat) | | | |

=== Ward 13 ===
Ward 13
| Party | Candidate | Votes | % |
|---|---|---|---|
| Conservative | J. Thomson | 631 | 47.1 |
| Labour | H. Boag | 341 | 25.5 |
| SDP | M. Temple | 254 | 19.0 |
| SNP | J. Mair | 111 | 8.3 |
| Majority | | 290 | 21.6 |
| Turnout | | 1,437 | 36.4 |
| Registered electors | | 3,675 | |
| Conservative win (new seat) | | | |

=== Ward 14 ===
Ward 13 was renamed Ward 14 following the Initial Statutory Reviews of Electoral Arrangements.

Ward 14
| Party | Candidate | Votes | % | ±% |
|---|---|---|---|---|
| Labour | J. O'Neil | 880 | 51.6 | ▲18.3 |
| Conservative | A. MacDougall | 818 | 47.9 | ▲14.0 |
| Majority | | 62 | 3.7 | N/A |
| Turnout | | 1,698 | 45.4 | ▼8.7 |
| Registered electors | | 2,794 | | |
| Labour gain from Conservative | | Swing | ▲2.1 | |

=== Ward 15 ===
Ward 15
| Party | Candidate | Votes | % |
|---|---|---|---|
| Labour | A. Nisbet | 1,066 | 81.7 |
| SNP | A. Wilson | 228 | 17.5 |
| Majority | | 838 | 64.2 |
| Turnout | | 1,294 | 36.8 |
| Registered electors | | 3,542 | |
| Labour win (new seat) | | | |

=== Ward 16 ===
Ward 14 was renamed Ward 16 following the Initial Statutory Reviews of Electoral Arrangements.

Ward 16
| Party | Candidate | Votes | % | ±% |
|---|---|---|---|---|
| Labour | J. Mills | 1,072 | 79.5 | ▲4.0 |
| Independent Labour | A. Muir | 156 | 11.6 | New |
| SNP | R. Young | 114 | 8.5 | ▲0.6 |
| Majority | | 916 | 68.1 | ▲9.1 |
| Turnout | | 1,342 | 37.5 | ▼9.9 |
| Registered electors | | 3,598 | | |
| Labour hold | | Swing | ▲10.2 | |

=== Ward 17 ===
Ward 15 was renamed Ward 17 following the Initial Statutory Reviews of Electoral Arrangements.

Ward 17
| Party | Candidate | Votes | % | ±% |
|---|---|---|---|---|
| Labour | G. Turnbull | 1,114 | 53.3 | ▲17.3 |
| Conservative | T. Whale | 790 | 37.8 | ▼7.7 |
| SNP | J. Harris | 184 | 8.8 | ▼9.6 |
| Majority | | 324 | 15.5 | N/A |
| Turnout | | 2,088 | 53.5 | ▼3.2 |
| Registered electors | | 3,904 | | |
| Labour gain from Conservative | | Swing | ▲12.5 | |

=== Ward 18 ===
Ward 16 was renamed Ward 18 following the Initial Statutory Reviews of Electoral Arrangements.

Ward 18
| Party | Candidate | Votes | % | ±% |
|---|---|---|---|---|
| Labour | J. Anderson | 1,007 | 77.9 | ▲18.0 |
| SNP | J. Dunnachie | 271 | 21.0 | ▲6.1 |
| Majority | | 736 | 56.9 | ▲22.1 |
| Turnout | | 1,278 | 36.0 | ▼24.2 |
| Registered electors | | 3,590 | | |
| Labour hold | | Swing | ▲21.5 | |
