= 1988 Kilmarnock and Loudoun District Council election =

Kilmarnock and Loudoun District Council election

← 1984	5 May 1988	1992 →

All 18 seats to Kilmarnock and Loudoun District Council 10 seats needed for a majority
- Registered: 62,481
- Turnout: 52.2%
	First party	Second party	Third party
	Lab	SNP	Con
Party	Labour	SNP	Conservative
Last election	14 seats, 56.2%	1 seat, 18.2%	3 seats, 36.1%
Seats won	12	3	3
Seat change	▼2	▲2	Steady
Popular vote	15,701	10,349	6,098
Percentage	48.3%	31.8%	18.8%
Swing	▼7.9	▲13.6	▼17.3
Council Leader before election
Labour
Council Leader after election
Labour

Elections to Kilmarnock and Loudoun District Council were held on 5 May 1988, on the same day as the other Scottish local government elections. This was the fifth election to the district council following the local government reforms in the 1970s.

The election used the 10 wards created by the Initial Statutory Reviews of Electoral Arrangements in 1981. Each ward elected one councillor using first-past-the-post voting.

Labour maintained a large majority on the district council after winning 12 of the 18 seats however, it was two less than the previous election in 1984 and their vote share fell by 7.9% to below half. The Scottish National Party (SNP) became the joint second-largest party after gaining two seats to hold three while the Conservatives maintained their three seats on the council despite their vote share falling by 17.3%.

== Results ==
1988 Kilmarnock and Loudoun District Council election result
Party	Seats	Gains	Losses	Net gain/loss	Seats %	Votes %	Votes	+/−
Labour	12	1	3	▼2	77.8	48.3	15,701	▼7.9
SNP	3	3	1	▲2	16.6	31.8	10,349	▲13.6
Conservative	3	1	1	Steady	16.6	18.8	6,098	▼17.3
SDP	0	0	0	Steady	0.0	1.1	351	New
Green	0	0	0	Steady	0.0	0.2	53	New
Total	18						32,552	

Notes

1. A-At the 1984 election, the SDP–Liberal Alliance won 2.6% of the vote with candidates from both the Social Democratic Party (SDP) and the Liberal Party. These parties subsequently merged in March 1988 to form the Social and Liberal Democrats. Some members of the SDP opposed the merger and split to form a new Social Democratic Party.

== Ward results ==
=== Ward 1 ===
Ward 1
Party	Candidate	Votes	%	±%
Labour	W. Doyle	823	53.2	▲18.3
SNP	J. Weir	615	39.8	▼24.9
Conservative	A. MacDougall	107	6.9	New
Majority		208	13.4	N/A
Turnout		1,545	55.3	▲4.2
Registered electors		2,794		
Labour gain from SNP		Swing	▲21.6	

=== Ward 2 ===
Ward 2
Party	Candidate	Votes	%	±%
Labour	C. Rutherford	811	45.4	▼12.2
SNP	E. Graham	678	38.0	▲12.1
Conservative	A. Park	242	13.6	▼2.7
Green	S. Grist	53	3.0	New
Majority		133	7.4	▼24.3
Turnout		1,784	51.2	▲5.2
Registered electors		3,483		
Labour hold		Swing	▼12.1	

=== Ward 3 ===
Ward 3
Party	Candidate	Votes	%	±%
Labour	J. Knapp	1,123	58.2	▲7.9
SNP	J. Caddis	755	39.2	▼2.5
Conservative	M. Park	50	2.6	New
Majority		368	19.0	▲10.4
Turnout		1,928	65.2	▲18.3
Registered electors		2,958		
Labour hold		Swing	▲5.2	

=== Ward 4 ===
Ward 4
Party	Candidate	Votes	%	±%
SNP	D. Coffey	586	36.3	▲24.3
Conservative	A. Parker	520	32.2	▼13.1
Labour	C. Mabon	505	31.3	▼11.1
Majority		66	4.1	N/A
Turnout		1,611	50.4	▲10.7
Registered electors		3,202		
SNP gain from Conservative		Swing	▲18.7	

=== Ward 5 ===
Ward 5
Party	Candidate	Votes	%	±%
Labour	W. Cree	868	48.1	▼8.3
SNP	A. Wallace	571	31.6	▲16.9
Conservative	B. Rubin	364	20.2	▼8.5
Majority		297	16.5	▼11.2
Turnout		1,803	48.6	▲4.7
Registered electors		3,718		
Labour hold		Swing	▼12.6	

=== Ward 6 ===
Ward 6
Party	Candidate	Votes	%	±%
Labour	A. McIntyre	1,161	59.9	▼19.5
SNP	E. Boyle	661	34.1	▲21.9
Conservative	A. McCluskey	116	6.0	▼2.3
Majority		500	25.8	▼41.4
Turnout		1,938	53.6	▲8.5
Registered electors		3,617		
Labour hold		Swing	▼20.7	

=== Ward 7 ===
Ward 7
Party	Candidate	Votes	%	±%
Labour	J. Buchanan	1,327	61.3	▲7.8
SNP	J. Todd	442	20.4	▲13.5
Conservative	S. Donald	393	18.2	▼21.1
Majority		885	40.9	▲26.7
Turnout		2,162	57.7	▲7.3
Registered electors		3,749		
Labour hold		Swing	▲14.4	

=== Ward 8 ===
Ward 8
Party	Candidate	Votes	%	±%
Conservative	M. Porter	1,050	62.6	▼3.8
Labour	J. Steven	254	15.1	▲2.7
SNP	J. Goldie	251	15.0	▲9.0
SDP	J. Cameron	118	7.0	New
Majority		796	47.5	▼4.0
Turnout		1,673	45.8	▲0.8
Registered electors		3,661		
Conservative hold		Swing	▼3.2	

=== Ward 9 ===
Ward 9
Party	Candidate	Votes	%	±%
SNP	N. Gee	693	37.4	▲23.3
Labour	J. O'Neil	659	35.5	▼12.6
Conservative	J. Porter	426	23.0	▼14.8
SDP	P. Kerr	75	4.0	New
Majority		34	1.9	N/A
Turnout		1,853	56.6	▲8.9
Registered electors		3,276		
SNP gain from Labour		Swing	▲17.9	

=== Ward 10 ===
Ward 10
Party	Candidate	Votes	%	±%
Labour	J. Blaney	774	50.5	▼12.4
SNP	J. Robertson	569	37.1	▲19.9
Conservative	J. Watret	188	12.3	▼7.4
Majority		205	13.4	▼29.8
Turnout		1,531	45.6	▲5.7
Registered electors		3,361		
Labour hold		Swing	▼16.1	

=== Ward 11 ===
Ward 11
Party	Candidate	Votes	%	±%
Labour	R. Stirling	1,073	61.3	▼25.5
SNP	C. Calman	578	33.0	▲20.3
Conservative	D. Scott	99	5.7	New
Majority		495	28.3	▼45.8
Turnout		1,750	57.5	▲14.7
Registered electors		3,046		
Labour hold		Swing	▼22.9	

=== Ward 12 ===
Ward 12
Party	Candidate	Votes	%	±%
SNP	I. George	943	52.8	▲19.2
Labour	J. Greig	724	40.5	▼26.3
Conservative	T. Donald	73	4.1	New
SDP	A. Stevenson	46	2.6	New
Majority		219	12.3	N/A
Turnout		1,786	56.3	▲14.3
Registered electors		3,176		
SNP gain from Labour		Swing	▲22.7	

=== Ward 13 ===
Ward 13
Party	Candidate	Votes	%	±%
Conservative	J. Thomson	777	45.2	▼1.9
Labour	W. Aitken	500	29.1	▲4.6
SNP	R. Mowatt	330	19.2	▲10.9
SDP	M. Temple	112	6.5	New
Majority		277	16.1	▼5.5
Turnout		1,719	45.0	▲8.6
Registered electors		3,824		
Conservative hold		Swing	▼3.2	

=== Ward 14 ===
Ward 14
Party	Candidate	Votes	%	±%
Conservative	A. MacDougall	803	37.1	▼10.8
Labour	J. O'Neill	724	33.4	▼18.2
SNP	A. Lyall	634	29.3	New
Majority		79	3.7	N/A
Turnout		2,161	56.1	▲10.7
Registered electors		3,859		
Conservative hold		Swing	▲7.4	

=== Ward 15 ===
Ward 15
Party	Candidate	Votes	%	±%
Labour	A. Nisbet	1,095	58.3	▼23.4
SNP	J. Graham	641	34.2	▲16.7
Conservative	W. Watret	138	7.4	New
Majority		454	24.1	▼40.1
Turnout		1,874	51.9	▲15.1
Registered electors		3,617		
Labour hold		Swing	▼20.0	

=== Ward 16 ===
Ward 16
Party	Candidate	Votes	%	±%
Labour	J. Mills	1,091	59.6	▼19.9
SNP	K. Nicoll	578	31.6	▲23.1
Conservative	D. Woodford	161	8.8	New
Majority		513	28.0	▼39.9
Turnout		1,830	50.8	▲13.3
Registered electors		3,607		
Labour hold		Swing	▼21.5	

=== Ward 17 ===
Ward 17
Party	Candidate	Votes	%	±%
Labour	G. Turnbull	1,270	63.9	▲10.6
SNP	F. MacLean	383	19.3	▲10.5
Conservative	A. Bates	332	16.7	▼21.1
Majority		887	44.6	▲29.1
Turnout		1,985	51.1	▼2.4
Registered electors		3,885		
Labour hold		Swing	▲15.8	

=== Ward 18 ===
Ward 18
Party	Candidate	Votes	%	±%
Labour	J. Anderson	919	56.6	▼21.3
SNP	N. Rooney	441	27.1	▲6.1
Conservative	D. Copinger	259	15.9	New
Majority		478	29.5	▼27.4
Turnout		1,619	44.5	▲8.5
Registered electors		3,648		
Labour hold		Swing	▼13.7	
