= Margaret Jamieson =

Scottish politician (born 1953)

Member of the Scottish Parliament for Kilmarnock and Loudoun
- In office 6 May 1999 – 2 April 2007
- Preceded by: New Parliament
- Succeeded by: Willie Coffey

Personal details
- Born: 1953 (age 72–73) Kilmarnock, Scotland
- Party: Scottish Labour Party

Margaret Jamieson (born 1953 in Kilmarnock) is a retired Scottish Labour politician . She was the Member of the Scottish Parliament (MSP) for Kilmarnock and Loudoun constituency from 1999 to 2007.

In 2007, she lost her seat to Willie Coffey of the Scottish National Party (SNP).

Prior to 1999, she had worked as a UNISON official.

Scottish Parliament
New parliament Scotland Act 1998	Member of the Scottish Parliament for Kilmarnock and Loudoun; 1999–2007	Succeeded by Willie Coffey
