= 1977 Kilmarnock and Loudoun District Council election =

Kilmarnock and Loudoun District Council election

- 3 May 1977

All 16 seats to Kilmarnock and Loudoun District Council 9 seats needed for a majority
- Registered: 61,152
- Turnout: 51.1%
	First party	Second party	Third party
	Lab	Con	SNP
Party	Labour	Conservative	SNP
Last election	12 seats, 54.9%	4 seats, 30.8%	N/A
Seats won	7	7	2
Seat change	▼5	▲3	▲2
Popular vote	12,000	10,028	8,032
Percentage	38.6%	32.2%	25.8%
Swing	▼16.3	▲1.4	▲25.8
Council Leader before election
Labour
Council Leader after election
TBD

Elections to Kilmarnock and Loudoun District Council were held on 3 May 1977, on the same day as the other Scottish local government elections. This was the second election to the district council following the local government reforms in 1974.

The election used the original 16 wards created by the Formation Electoral Arrangements in 1974. Each ward elected one councillor using first-past-the-post voting.

Labour won the popular vote despite their vote share decreasing by 16.3% and, as a result, lost overall control of the district council. The party lost five seats to hold seven – two short of an overall majority. The Conservatives tied as the joint-largest party with Labour on seven seats – an increase of three from previous election in 1974. For the first time, the Scottish National Party (SNP) won seats in Kilmarnock and Loudoun as they took the remaining two seats which put them in position as the kingmaker.

== Results ==
1977 Kilmarnock and Loudoun District Council election result
Party	Seats	Gains	Losses	Net gain/loss	Seats %	Votes %	Votes	+/−
Labour	7	0	5	▼5	43.7	38.6	12,000	▼16.3
Conservative	7	3	0	▲3	43.7	32.2	10,028	▲1.4
SNP	2	2	0	▲2	12.5	25.8	8,032	New
Liberal	0	0	0	Steady	0.0	2.4	734	▼11.2
SLP	0	0	0	Steady	0.0	0.8	241	New
Independent	0	0	0	Steady	0.0	0.2	62	New
Total	16						31,097	

== Ward results ==
=== Ward 1 ===
Ward 1
Party	Candidate	Votes	%	±%
SNP	R. Brown	1,139	45.3	New
Labour	J. Raphael	901	35.9	▼32.3
Conservative	C. Peever	472	18.8	▼13.1
Majority		238	9.4	N/A
Turnout		2,512	54.5	▲9.0
Registered electors		4,613		
SNP gain from Labour		Swing	▲38.8	

=== Ward 2 ===
Ward 2
Party	Candidate	Votes	%	±%
Labour	R. Creighton	968	60.7	▲0.1
Liberal	P. McMillan	626	39.3	▲15.4
Majority		342	21.4	▼15.3
Turnout		1,594	42.7	▼6.7
Registered electors		3,795		
Labour hold		Swing	▼7.6	

=== Ward 3 ===
Ward 3
Party	Candidate	Votes	%	±%
Labour	J. Hunter	917	44.9	▼28.9
SNP	R. Brailsford	700	34.3	New
Conservative	J. Steele	424	20.8	▼5.4
Majority		217	10.6	▼37.0
Turnout		2,041	48.8	▲5.8
Registered electors		4,206		
Labour hold		Swing	▼31.6	

=== Ward 4 ===
Ward 4
Party	Candidate	Votes	%	±%
Conservative	R. Ledgerwood	782	38.1	▼3.8
SNP	J. Langlands	678	33.0	New
Labour	B. McAree	484	23.6	▼7.0
Liberal	T. Purdon	108	5.3	▼12.4
Majority		104	5.1	▼6.2
Turnout		2,052	51.7	▲6.2
Registered electors		3,978		
Conservative hold		Swing	▼18.4	

=== Ward 5 ===
Ward 5
Party	Candidate	Votes	%	±%
Labour	J. Anderson	1,040	52.1	▼25.9
SNP	C. Calman	957	47.9	New
Majority		83	4.2	▼60.8
Turnout		1,997	51.6	▲4.9
Registered electors		3,895		
Labour hold		Swing	▼36.9	

=== Ward 6 ===
Ward 6
Party	Candidate	Votes	%	±%
Conservative	M. Parker	1,156	56.5	▼0.4
SNP	P. Gibson	507	24.8	New
Labour	J. Hollywood	383	18.7	▼14.1
Majority		649	21.7	▼2.4
Turnout		2,046	62.0	▲4.7
Registered electors		3,304		
Conservative hold		Swing	▼12.6	

=== Ward 7 ===
Ward 7
Party	Candidate	Votes	%	±%
Conservative	J. Porter	812	35.9	▼8.1
SNP	R. Ferguson	756	33.4	New
Labour	G. Wallace	634	28.0	▼18.8
Independent	T. Ryan	62	2.7	New
Majority		56	2.5	N/A
Turnout		2,264	58.0	▲1.1
Registered electors		3,906		
Conservative gain from Labour		Swing	▼20.7	

=== Ward 8 ===
Ward 8
Party	Candidate	Votes	%	±%
Conservative	M. Porter	1,430	80.9	▲14.6
Labour	W. Maxwell	337	19.1	▼0.7
Majority		1,093	61.8	▲15.3
Turnout		1,767	48.7	▼7.0
Registered electors		3,667		
Conservative hold		Swing	▲7.6	

=== Ward 9 ===
Ward 9
Party	Candidate	Votes	%	±%
Labour	M. Garven	892	41.7	▼26.4
SNP	C. Calderwood	877	41.0	New
Conservative	J. Watson	370	17.3	▼1.3
Majority		15	0.7	▼48.8
Turnout		2,139	50.8	▲5.6
Registered electors		4,213		
Labour hold		Swing	▼33.7	

=== Ward 10 ===
Ward 10
Party	Candidate	Votes	%	±%
SNP	L. Flannigan	983	43.8	New
Labour	T. Ferguson	885	39.4	▼32.8
Conservative	W. Adams	270	12.0	▼3.8
SLP	P. Clark	108	4.8	New
Majority		98	4.4	N/A
Turnout		2,246	48.1	▲6.2
Registered electors		4,676		
SNP gain from Labour		Swing	▲38.3	

=== Ward 11 ===
Ward 11
Party	Candidate	Votes	%	±%
Conservative	J. Thomson	1,225	85.7	▲28.5
Labour	A. McKinlay	204	14.3	▼4.3
Majority		1,021	71.4	▲38.4
Turnout		1,429	50.9	▼3.6
Registered electors		2,833		
Conservative hold		Swing	▲16.4	

=== Ward 12 ===
Ward 12
Party	Candidate	Votes	%	±%
Labour	A. Nisbet	1,237	76.1	▼4.8
Conservative	D. MacIntosh	388	23.9	▲4.7
Majority		849	52.2	▼9.5
Turnout		1,625	40.7	▼7.6
Registered electors		4,028		
Labour hold		Swing	▼4.7	

=== Ward 13 ===
Ward 13
Party	Candidate	Votes	%	±%
Conservative	A. MacDougall	973	35.2	▲13.1
SNP	W. Lamond	915	33.1	New
Labour	B. McGeechan	743	26.9	▼19.4
SLP	J. McFadden	133	4.8	New
Majority		58	2.1	N/A
Turnout		2,764	63.6	▲8.4
Registered electors		4,359		
Conservative gain from Labour		Swing	▲16.2	

=== Ward 14 ===
Ward 14
Party	Candidate	Votes	%	±%
Labour	A. Lundie	1,059	64.1	▼8.8
Conservative	A. Wight	592	35.9	▲17.1
Majority		467	28.2	▼25.9
Turnout		1,651	40.1	▼12.8
Registered electors		4,156		
Labour hold		Swing	▼12.9	

=== Ward 15 ===
Ward 15
Party	Candidate	Votes	%	±%
Conservative	T. Whale	615	36.4	▲8.4
Labour	C. Brown	553	32.8	▼14.8
SNP	M. Blaney	520	30.8	New
Majority		62	3.6	N/A
Turnout		1,688	55.9	▲3.4
Registered electors		3,025		
Conservative gain from Labour		Swing	▲11.6	

=== Ward 16 ===
Ward 16
Party	Candidate	Votes	%	±%
Labour	J. Anderson	763	59.5	▲2.1
Conservative	J. Armstrong	519	40.5	▲22.7
Majority		244	19.0	▼13.6
Turnout		1,282	51.6	▼9.0
Registered electors		2,498		
Labour hold		Swing	▼10.8	
