= Kilmarnock and Loudoun (Scottish Parliament constituency) =

Region or constituency of the Scottish Parliament

- Former county constituency for the Scottish Parliament
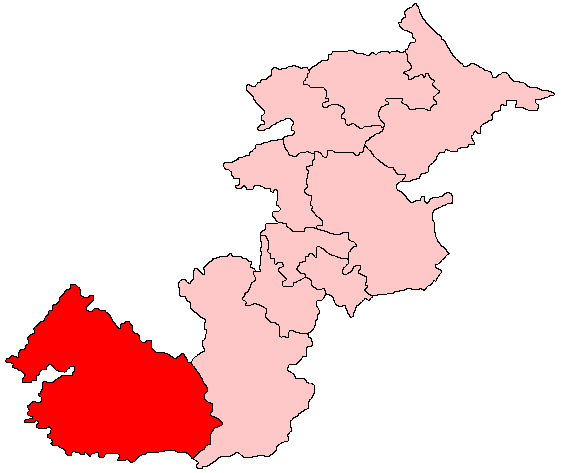

- Kilmarnock and Loudoun shown within the Central Scotland electoral region and the region shown within Scotland

Former constituency
- Created: 1999
- Abolished: 2011
- Council area: East Ayrshire (part)
- Replaced by: Kilmarnock and Irvine Valley

Kilmarnock and Loudoun was a constituency of the Scottish Parliament. It elected one Member of the Scottish Parliament (MSP) by the First past the post method of election. Under the additional-member electoral system used for elections to the Scottish Parliament, it was also one of ten constituencies in the Central Scotland electoral region, which elected seven additional members, in addition to ten constituency MSPs, to produce a form of proportional representation for the region as a whole.

The constituency was abolished ahead of the 2011 Scottish Parliament election, with the area covered being split largely forming the new seat of Kilmarnock and Irvine Valley.

== Electoral region ==
The region covered all of the Falkirk council area, all of the North Lanarkshire council area, part of the South Lanarkshire council area, part of the East Ayrshire council area and a small part of the East Dumbartonshire council area.

== Constituency boundaries and council area ==
The constituency was created ahead of the first elections to the Scottish Parliament in 1999. As with all seats contested at this election, it used the name and boundaries of an existing UK House of Commons of Commons constituency: Kilmarnock and Loudoun. constituency. The Westminster constituency was created during the period of when two tiers of local government were in place (the regions and districts of Scotland, which existed between 1975 and 1996) when there was a Kilmarnock and Loudoun district of the Strathclyde region. In 1996 regions and districts were replaced with unitary council areas. Ahead of the 2005 United Kingdom general election the House of Commons constituencies in Scotland were altered, whilst the existing Scottish Parliament constituencies were initially retained, and there is now no longer any link between the two sets of boundaries.

The Kilmarnock and Loudoun constituency covered a northern portion of the East Ayrshire council area. The rest of the East Ayrshire area was covered by Carrick, Cumnock and Doon Valley, which also covered a southern portion of the South Ayrshire council area. Carrick, Cumnock and Doon Valley was within the South of Scotland electoral region.

== Boundary review ==
See Scottish Parliament constituencies and regions from 2011

Following their First Periodic review into constituencies to the Scottish Parliament in time for the 2011 elections, the Boundary Commission for Scotland recommended the creating of a new seat to be known as Kilmarnock and Irvine Valley, which was formed from the Kilmarnock, Annick, and Irvine Valley electoral areas of East Ayrshire.

== Member of the Scottish Parliament ==
Election	Member	Party
1999	Margaret Jamieson	Labour
2007	Willie Coffey	Scottish National Party
2011	Constituency abolished; see Kilmarnock and Irvine Valley	

== Election results ==
=== 2007 Parliamentary election ===
2007 Scottish Parliament election: Kilmarnock and Loudoun
Party	Candidate	Votes	%	±%
SNP	Willie Coffey	14,297	42.76	+6.52
Labour	Margaret Jamieson	12,955	38.75	−1.33
Conservative	Janette McAlpine	4,127	12.34	+1.88
Liberal Democrats	Ron Aitken	2,056	6.15	+1.17
Majority		1,342	4.01	N/A
Turnout		34,453	56.68	+4.75
SNP gain from Labour		Swing		

=== 2003 Parliamentary election ===
2003 Scottish Parliament election: Kilmarnock and Loudoun
Party	Candidate	Votes	%	±%
Labour	Margaret Jamieson	12,633	40.08	−4.00
SNP	Daniel Coffey	11,423	36.24	−0.83
Conservative	Robin Traquair	3,296	10.46	−1.20
Liberal Democrats	Ian Gibson	1,571	4.98	−2.21
Scottish Socialist	Colin Rutherford	1,421	4.51	New
Independent	Mary Anderson	404	1.28	New
Independent	Matthew Donnelly	402	1.28	New
Scottish People's	Lyndsay McIntosh	371	1.18	N/A
Majority		1,210	3.84	−3.17
Turnout		31,705	51.93	
Labour hold		Swing		

=== 1999 Parliamentary election ===
1999 Scottish Parliament election: Kilmarnock and Loudoun
Party	Candidate	Votes	%	±%
Labour	Margaret Jamieson	17,345	44.08	N/A
SNP	Alex Neil	14,585	37.07	N/A
Conservative	Lyndsay McIntosh	4,589	11.66	N/A
Liberal Democrats	John Stewart	2,830	7.19	N/A
Majority		2,760	7.01	N/A
Turnout		39,349		N/A
Labour win (new seat)				
