= Kilmarnock and Loudoun (district) =

Scottish district in East Ayrshire, Scotland

Coordinates: 55.67294°N 4.48517°W

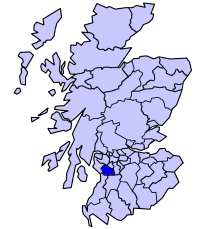
- Kilmarnock and Loudoun district within Scotland
- History
  - Created: 16 May 1975
  - Abolished: 31 March 1996
  - Succeeded by: East Ayrshire
- Status: District
- Government: Kilmarnock and Loudoun District Council
  - HQ: Kilmarnock

Kilmarnock and Loudoun (Scottish Gaelic: Cill Mhearnaig agus Lughdan) was one of nineteen local government districts in the Strathclyde region of Scotland from 1975 to 1996.

== History ==
The district was created in 1975 under the Local Government (Scotland) Act 1973, which established a two-tier structure of local government across Scotland comprising upper-tier regions and lower-tier districts. Kilmarnock and Loudon was one of nineteen districts created within the region of Strathclyde. The district covered the whole area of five former districts and most of a sixth from the historic county of Ayrshire, which were all abolished at the same time:

- Darvel Burgh
- Galston Burgh
- Kilmarnock Burgh
- Kilmarnock District (except the part within the designated area of Irvine New Town)
- Newmilns and Greenholm Burgh
- Stewarton Burgh

The district was abolished in 1996 by the Local Government etc. (Scotland) Act 1994, which replaced the regions and districts with unitary council areas. The district's area was combined with that of Cumnock and Doon Valley to form the East Ayrshire council area.

The name Kilmarnock and Loudoun continues to be used for a constituency of the House of Commons and, covering a similar area, a Kilmarnock and Loudoun constituency of the Scottish Parliament.

== Political control ==
The first election to the district council was held in 1974, initially operating as a shadow authority alongside the outgoing authorities until it came into its powers on 16 May 1975. Political control of the council from 1975 was as follows:

Party in control	Years
Labour	1975–1977
No overall control	1977–1980
Labour	1980–1992
No overall control	1992–1996

== Premises ==
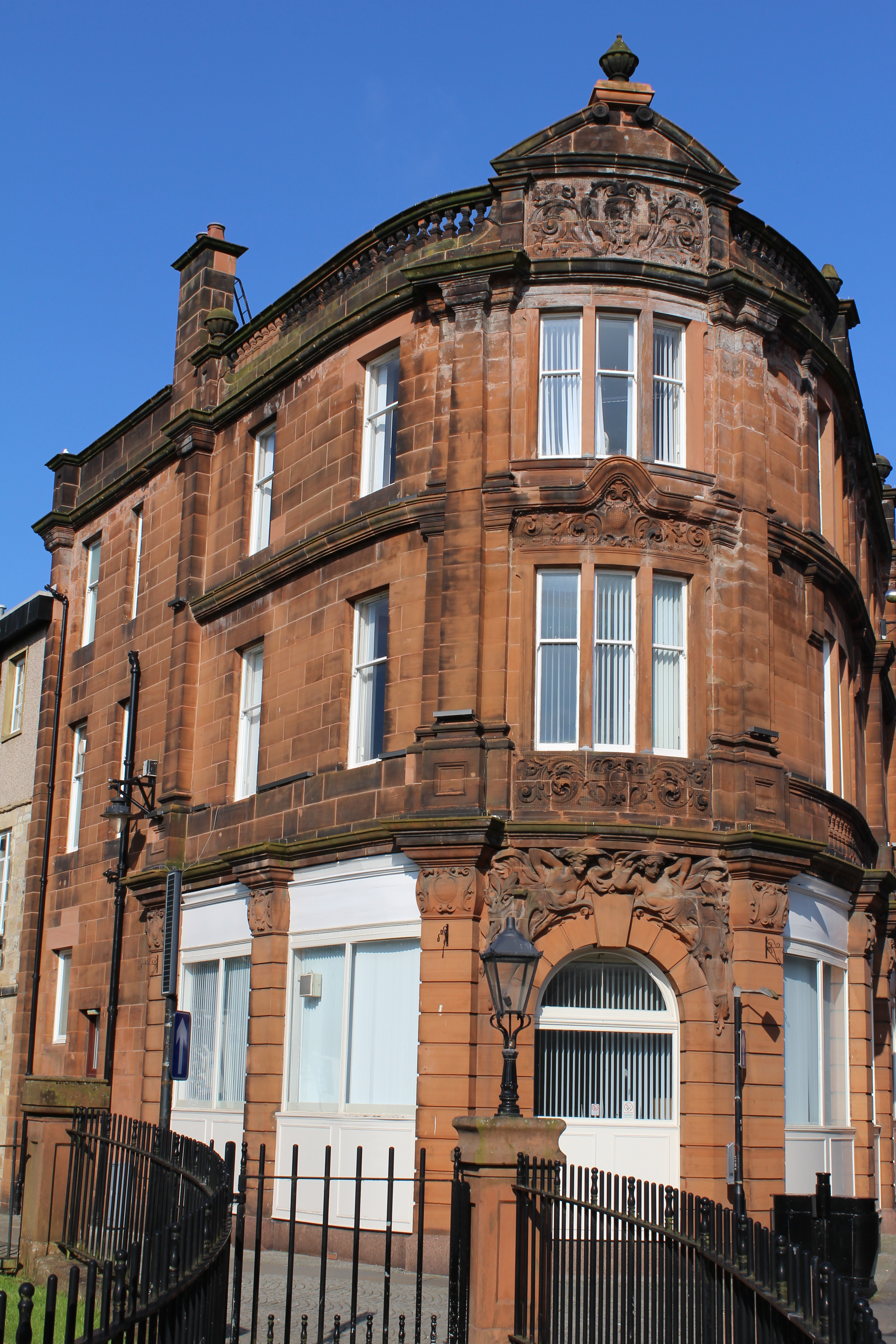
Part of Civic Centre (South), John Dickie Street, Kilmarnock

The council based itself in Kilmarnock, the area's largest town. The former Kilmarnock Town Hall on King Street was demolished around the same time the new district council was created. The council instead based itself at two pre-existing buildings on either side of John Dickie Street, calling them the Civic Centre. On the south side of the street the council chambers were in a building on the corner with John Finnie Street, which had been built in 1905 as Wallace Chambers, offices for distillery William Wallace and Company. Opposite it on the north side of John Dickie Street the council also took over the former headquarters of the Kilmarnock Co-operative Society, which had been built in 1880.

The Civic Centre continues to be used as secondary offices by the council's successor, East Ayrshire Council, although that council established its headquarters at a converted school on London Road in Kilmarnock.

== See also ==
- Subdivisions of Scotland
- Kilmarnock
- Loudoun
